= List of local nature reserves in Suffolk =

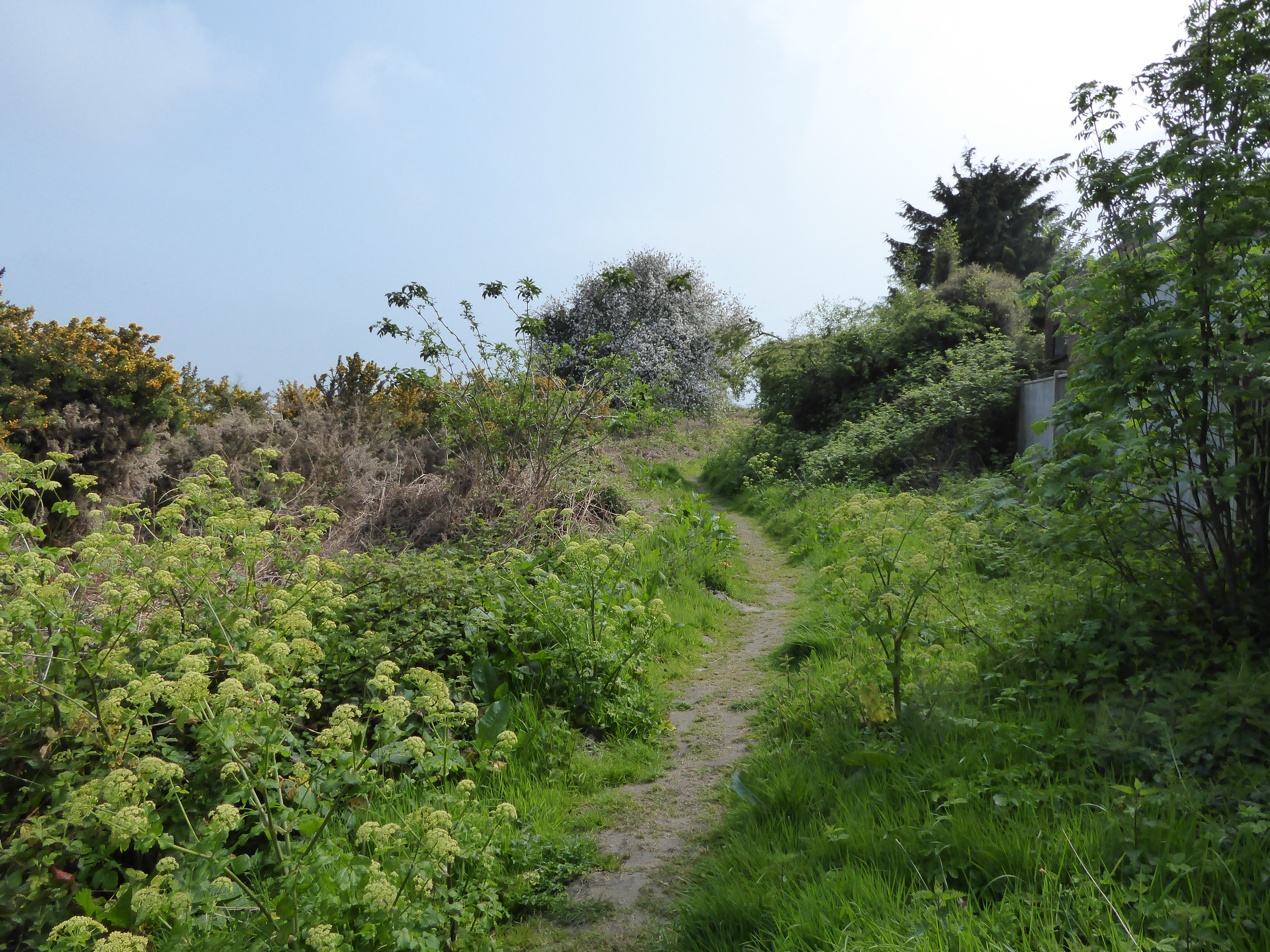
A path down to the sea in Gunton Warren in Lowestoft

Suffolk is a county in East Anglia. It is bounded by Norfolk to the north, Cambridgeshire to the west and Essex to the south. With an area of 1,466 square miles (3,800 km^{2}), it is the eighth largest county in England, and in mid-2016 the population was 745,000. At the top level of local government is Suffolk County Council, and below it are five borough and district councils: Ipswich, East Suffolk, Mid Suffolk, Babergh and West Suffolk. Much of the coast consists of the estuaries of the Orwell, Stour, Alde, Deben and Blyth rivers, with large areas of wetlands and marshes.

Local nature reserves (LNRs) are designated by local authorities under the National Parks and Access to the Countryside Act 1949. The local authority must have a legal control over the site, by owning or leasing it or having an agreement with the owner. LNRs are sites which have a special local interest either biologically or geologically, and local authorities have a duty to care for them. They can apply local bye-laws to manage and protect LNRs.

As of August 2017 there are 36 LNRs in the county. Three are in Areas of Outstanding Natural Beauty, seven are Sites of Special Scientific Interest, one is a Nature Conservation Review site and two are managed by the Suffolk Wildlife Trust. The largest LNR is Sudbury Common Lands with 50.3 hectares (124 acres), which has ancient wetlands, and the smallest is Alderman Canal West at 1.0 hectare (2.5 acres), which has rare wetland flora.

== Key ==
=== Other classifications ===
- DVAONB = Dedham Vale Area of Outstanding Natural Beauty
- NCR = Nature Conservation Review
- SCHAONB = Suffolk Coast and Heaths Area of Outstanding Natural Beauty
- SWT = Suffolk Wildlife Trust
- SSSI = Site of Special Scientific Interest

== Sites ==
Site	Photograph	Area (Note: The area is taken from the Natural England map of each site. (Click on the identify icon (i) in the "Feature Tools" and then click on the site.))	Location (Note: Unless otherwise stated, the location is taken from the Natural England details page for the site.)	District	Other classifications	Map (Note: The maps are on the Natural England database of local nature reserves.)	Details (Note: Details are on the pages on each site in the Natural England database of local nature reserves.)	Description
Alderman Canal East	Alderman Canal East	1.6 hectares (4.0 acres)	Ipswich; 52.057°N 1.142°E; TM 155 445	Ipswich		Map	Details	A path runs a long a canalised part of the River Gipping, and the site also has reedbeds, a ditch and grassland with tall herbs. There are uncommon wetland flora, and birds include spotted flycatchers, kingfishers and reed buntings.
Alderman Canal West	Alderman Canal West	1.0 hectare (2.5 acres)	Ipswich; 52.055°N 1.14°E; TM 154 443	Ipswich		Map	Details	Paths run along the canal and through reedbeds. There is also grassland with tall herbs, and the canal bank has rare wetland flora. Birds include kingfishers and reed buntings.
Arger Fen	Arger Fen	17.6 hectares (43 acres)	Assington; 51.983°N 0.813°E; TL 933 354	Babergh	DVAONB, SSSI, SWT	Map	Details	This site has ancient woodland and wet meadows. There is a diverse range of tree species, including wild cherry, field maple and crab apple. Uncommon fauna include hazel dormice and barbastelle bats.
Aspal Close	Aspal Close	18.9 hectares (47 acres)	Beck Row; 52.369°N 0.493°E; TL 698 775	West Suffolk		Map	Details	This site has grassland, woodland and scrub. Almost 300 plant and six bat species have been recorded, and there are around 200 ancient oaks, some of which may be 1,000 years old. There are a car park and a football pitch.
Barton Mills Valley	Barton Mills Valley	10.7 hectares (26 acres)	Mildenhall; 52.337°N 0.525°E; TL 721 740	West Suffolk	SSSI	Map	Details	This diverse site has reedbeds, alder carr, willow carr and sedge areas. There are picnic benches, a car park and disabled access.
Bixley Heath	Bixley Heath	5.1 hectares (13 acres)	Ipswich; 52.042°N 1.205°E; TM 199 430	Ipswich	SSSI	Map	Details	This site has areas of dry heath on high ground and swamp in a valley bottom. The heath is dominated by common heather, and other plants include bell heather and sheep's fescue. There is a dense stand of lesser pond-sedge in the swamp.
Bobbits Lane	Bobbits Lane	16.1 hectares (40 acres)	Ipswich; 52.03°N 1.128°E; TM 147 415	Ipswich		Map	Details	Grassy paths run through these wet meadows. Fauna include otters, water voles, kingfishers, egrets and toads.
Bourne Park Reed Beds	Bourne Park Reed Beds	7.4 hectares (18 acres)	Ipswich; 52.032°N 1.139°E; TM 154 417	Ipswich		Map	Details	This nature reserve in Bourne Park is a linear area of reed beds, scrub woodland and tall herb fen, along the north bank of Belstead Brook.
Bramford Meadows	Bramford Meadows	9.0 hectares (22 acres)	Bramford; 52.076°N 1.104°E; TM 128 465	Mid Suffolk		Map	Details	This site on the east bank of the River Gipping has grassland and scrub, and it is crossed by wet ditches and the former course of the river. Flora in the ditches include water forget me not, water mint, brooklime and water figwort.
Bridge Wood	Bridge Wood	31.0 hectares (77 acres)	Ipswich; 52.019°N 1.184°E; TM 186 404	Ipswich		Map	Details	This site has been managed as woodland at least since 1600, and it has several ancient oaks. There are also areas of pine, which are being thinned to create a more mixed woodland.
Broom Hill, Hadleigh	Broom Hill	3.9 hectares (9.6 acres)	Hadleigh; 52.043°N 0.944°E; TM 020 424	Babergh		Map	Details	This former quarry is now covered with woodland, grassland and scrub. There are many ancient trees, together with pollarded oaks and small-leaved limes, which had high branches removed, and coppiced hazel and lime trees, which were cut at ground level.
Church Meadow	Church Meadow	3.8 hectares (9.4 acres)	Stowmarket; 52.173°N 0.997°E; TM 050 570	Mid Suffolk		Map	Details	This was formerly the garden of Combs Hall, which was demolished in 1756. Surviving features include earth banks and a round pond, which has frogs, newts, toads and many dragonflies. The meadow is grazed by sheep.
The Dales Open Space	The Dales Open Space	5.9 hectares (15 acres)	Ipswich; 52.072°N 1.142°E; TM 154 462	Ipswich		Map	Details	Most of this former quarry is secondary woodland, but there are also areas of scrub, two spring-fed ponds and seasonal pools. In the north the site is a flat valley bottom, and it slopes up steeply in the south.
Fen Alder Carr	Fen Alder Carr	1.7 hectares (4.2 acres)	Stowmarket; 52.168°N 1.053°E; TM 089 566	Mid Suffolk		Map	Details	This site has diverse habitats, including open water, alder carr woodland and tall fen. There is a large rookery high in the trees, and there are other birds such as siskins, chaffinches and redpolls.
Gunton Warren and Corton Woods	Gunton Warren	31.9 hectares (79 acres)	Lowestoft; 52.501°N 1.751°E; TM 547 959	East Suffolk	SWT	Map	Details	Gunton Warren is a coastal site which has sand dunes, shingle, lowland heath and cliff slopes. Birds include rare migrants such as icterines and yellow-browed warblers. Corton Woods has mature trees and diverse flora such as lesser celandine, bee orchids and common spotted orchids.
Gunton Wood	Gunton Wood	2.8 hectares (6.9 acres)	Lowestoft; 52.502°N 1.742°E; TM 541 959	East Suffolk		Map	Details	This was formerly part of the gardens of Gunton Old Hall, which was demolished in 1963. There are trees such as lime, oak and copper beech, a pond and green winged and bee orchids.
The Haven, Aldeburgh	The Haven, Aldeburgh	20.2 hectares (50 acres)	Aldeburgh; 52.164°N 1.606°E; TM 467 579	East Suffolk	SCHAONB, SSSI	Map	Details	The site covers the beach north of Aldeburgh and an area of lagoons and reedbeds which are protected as nature reserves. It has a sculpture called Scallop by Maggi Hambling, designed as a tribute to Benjamin Britten.
Haverhill Railway Walks	Haverhill Railway Walks	14.1 hectares (35 acres)	Haverhill; 52.08°N 0.46°E; TL 686 448	West Suffolk		Map	Details	This is a footpath along a three mile stretch of a defunct section of the Stour Valley Railway. Much of it is covered with scrub and large trees, and it provides a wildlife corridor for a diverse range of fauna and flora through the centre of Haverhill.
Landguard Common	Landguard Common	16.3 hectares (40 acres)	Felixstowe; 51.937°N 1.323°E; TM 285 317	East Suffolk	SSSI	Map	Details	This site has a rare vegetated shingle habitat, with plants including sea kale and yellow horned poppy. There are birds such as purple sandpipers, wheatears and snow buntings.
Leathes Ham	Leathes Ham	6.0 hectares (15 acres)	Lowestoft; 52.479°N 1.726°E; TM 531 933	East Suffolk		Map	Details	In the medieval period this site was turbary, an area which was dug for peat, and it later flooded and became a lake. It has a reedbed, dykes, and marshes where wildfowl breed. Flora include ragged robin and southern marsh orchid.
Maidscross Hill	Maidscross Hill	49.8 hectares (123 acres)	Brandon; 52.41°N 0.54°E; TL 728 823	West Suffolk	NCR, SSSI	Map	Details	This very dry grassland has four nationally rare plants, Breckland wild thyme, Spanish catchfly, grape hyacinth and sickle medick. The site is not grazed, which has allowed invasion by bracken and scrub, but also increased the nesting sites for birds.
Mill Stream	Mill Stream	4.7 hectares (12 acres)	Ipswich; 52.053°N 1.222°E; TM 210 443	East Suffolk		Map	Details	This linear site along the banks of a stream also has ponds, wet carr, woodland, wildflower grassland and willow scrub. There are ancient oak trees, and fauna include water voles.
Millennium Wood	Millennium Wood	3.8 hectares (9.4 acres)	Ipswich; 52.029°N 1.124°E; TM 144 413	Ipswich		Map	Details	New saplings have been planted on the edge of this ancient, semi-natural wood of hornbeam and coppiced lime. There are many flowers in the spring such as bluebells, wild garlic and archangel.
Moreton Hall Community Woods	Moreton Hall Community Woods	18.5 hectares (46 acres)	Bury St Edmunds; 52.248°N 0.733°E; TL 867 646	West Suffolk		Map	Details	This site in six separate areas has woodland, grassland, a pond, paths and cycleways.
Needham Lake	Needham Lake	9.9 hectares (24 acres)	Needham Market; 52.153°N 1.06°E; TM 094 549	Mid Suffolk		Map	Details	The lake is in former sand and gravel workings. It has diverse fauna and flora in aquatic, marsh and scrub habitats. There are grass and tarmac paths.
The Pennings, Eye	The Pennings	2.7 hectares (6.7 acres)	Bury St Edmunds; 52.319°N 1.153°E; TM 150 736	Mid Suffolk		Map	Details	This site on the east bank of the River Dove is managed as a hay meadow. Fauna on the river bank include kingfishers and water voles.
Pipers Vale	Pipers Vale	19.7 hectares (49 acres)	Ipswich; 52.028°N 1.173°E; TM 178 414	Ipswich		Map	Details	This site on the bank of the River Orwell is part of Orwell Country Park. Its diverse habitats include heath, reedbeds, scrub and alder carr. Over 100 bird species have been recorded, including redwings, whimbrels and bullfinches.
Railway Walk, Hadleigh	Hadleigh Railway Walk	11.6 hectares (29 acres)	Hadleigh; 52.03°N 0.98°E; TM 046 409	Babergh		Map	Details	The walk starts at the original station building in Hadleigh, which is now a private house. The route goes along a flat path, some of it on raised banks and other parts on downward slopes. Most of it is bordered by trees.
The Railway Walks	The Railway Walks	25.3 hectares (63 acres)	Sudbury; 52.1°N 0.8°E; TL 857 435	Babergh		Map	Details	The walk has diverse fauna and flora in habitats such as water meadows, streams, ditches and ponds. Birds include willow warblers, kingfishers, woodpeckers, mallards, moorhens and swans.
Rede Wood	Rede Wood	7.5 hectares (19 acres)	Ipswich; 52.112°N 1.143°E; TM 153 506	Mid Suffolk		Map	Details	This semi-natural wood on boulder clay is mainly pedunculate oak and ash, with a coppiced understorey mainly of hazel. The flora include 38 species indicative of ancient woodland.
Riverside Walk, Hadleigh	Riverside Walk	4.6 hectares (11 acres)	Hadleigh; 52.043°N 0.948°E; TM 023 424	Babergh		Map	Details	This linear site on the west bank of the River Brett comprises two footpaths and the alder woodland and fen between them. Great willowherb and meadowsweet grow in marshy silted up ditches, and birds include warblers and finches.
Sandlings	Sandlings	5.7 hectares (14 acres)	Ipswich; 52.056°N 1.213°E; TM 204 445	East Suffolk		Map	Details	This site has acid grassland, a wildflower meadow and areas of scrub. Nearly 70 species of bird have been observed and 22 of butterfly, including the white-letter hairstreak.
Spring Wood, Belstead	Spring Wood	5.5 hectares (14 acres)	Ipswich; 52.029°N 1.124°E; TM 144 413	Ipswich		Map	Details	This ancient oak and hornbeam wood has an understorey of hazel. There are small-leaved limes in groups several metres in diameter, which are genetically one tree, as a result of coppicing decades ago.
Stoke Park Wood	Stoke Park Wood	2.2 hectares (5.4 acres)	Ipswich; 52.034°N 1.133°E; TM 150 419	Ipswich		Map	Details	This ancient wood was formerly part of the Stoke Park estate, and it still has the remains of a Victorian drainage system. It was formerly called Fishpond Covert as it had a large fishpond. It is a mixed woodland with grass trails and glades.
Sudbury Common Lands	Sudbury Common Lands	50.3 hectares (124 acres)	Sudbury; 52.04°N 0.72°E; TL 868 417	Babergh		Map	Details	This site has ancient wetland with ponds and ditches, and there are locally uncommon species such as flowering rush, tubular water dropwort and round-fruited rush. There is also grassland which has never been ploughed, and it has diverse grasses and wildflowers.
Tiger Hill	Tiger Hill	21.0 hectares (52 acres)	Assington; 51.986°N 0.805°E; TL 927 357	Babergh	DVAONB, SSSI	Map	Details	This site has woodland, heath and fenland, and fauna include badgers, bats and rare and endangered dormice.

== See also ==
- List of Sites of Special Scientific Interest in Suffolk
- National nature reserves in Suffolk
