= List of regionally important geological/geomorphological sites (RIGS) in Suffolk =

This is a list of the Regionally Important Geological/Geomorphological Sites (RIGS) in Suffolk.

There are 8 of these sites, all administered by GeoSuffolk.

- Dunwich Cliff
- Dunwich Heath Cliff
- Cavenham Heath
- Sudbury Railway Pit
- Bugg's Hole Fen, Thelnetham
- Needham Lake
- Calke Wood
- Holywells Park, Ipswich
