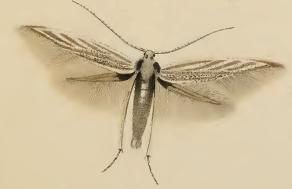

Scientific classification
- Kingdom: Animalia
- Phylum: Arthropoda
- Class: Insecta
- Order: Lepidoptera
- Family: Coleophoridae
- Genus: Coleophora
- Species: C. galbulipennella

Binomial name
- Coleophora galbulipennella Zeller, 1838

Synonyms
- Coleophora obliterata Toll 1952; Coleophora otitae Zeller 1839

= Coleophora galbulipennella =

Species of moth

Coleophora galbulipennella is a moth of the family Coleophoridae or leaf miners. It is known from Europe, where it is found from Sweden to Spain, Italy and Greece and from Great Britain to southern Russia.

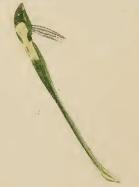
Mined leaf of Silene otites with larval case attached

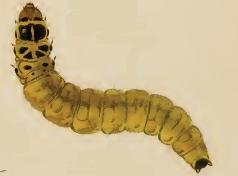
Larva

The wingspan is 15–17 mm (0.59–0.67 in). The moth flies in August depending on the location.

The larvae feed on Silene nutans, Silene otites, Silene italica, Arenaria grandiflora, Cerastium arvense and Lychnis viscaria. Silene nutans can sometimes be found in the UK National Vegetation Classification habitat communities: the very widespread MG1 (Arrhenatherum elatius grassland), and thus can be found where Arrhenatherum elatius, (also known as false oat grass), and/or Dactylis glomerata, (cock's-foot), occurs. They create a trivalved, tubular silken case of about 12 mm (0.47 in) long. The case is yellowish white, with several characteristic dark length lines. The mouth angle is about 40°.
