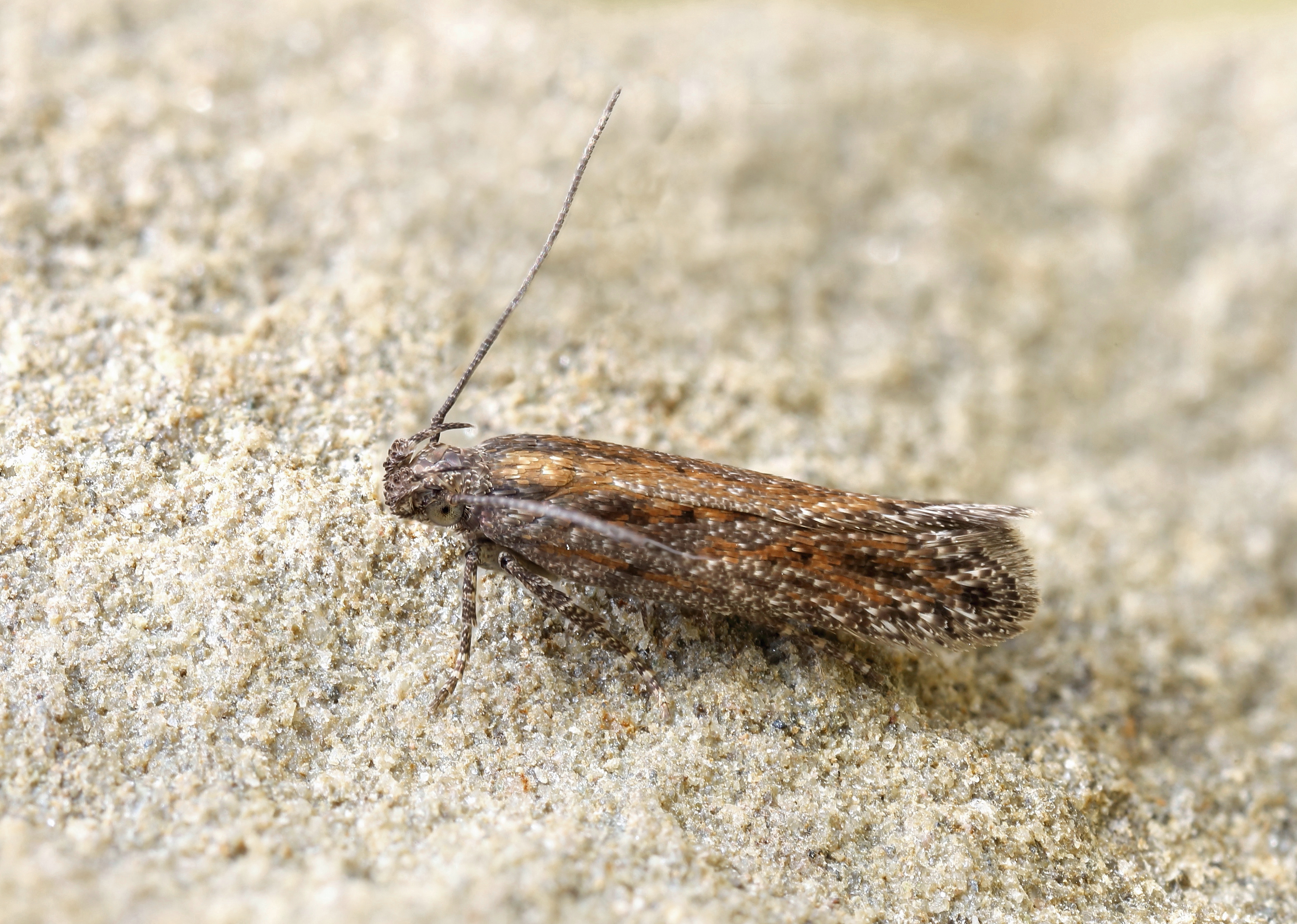
- Scrobipalpa artemisiella, Cavenham Heath, Suffolk
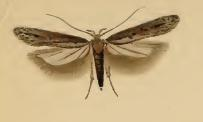

Scientific classification
- Domain: Eukaryota
- Kingdom: Animalia
- Phylum: Arthropoda
- Class: Insecta
- Order: Lepidoptera
- Family: Gelechiidae
- Genus: Scrobipalpa
- Species: S. artemisiella

Binomial name
- Scrobipalpa artemisiella (Treitschke, 1833)

Synonyms
- Lita artemisiella Treitschke, 1833; Gnorimoschema artemisiellum; Scrobipalpa artemisiellum; Anacampsis ancillella Bruand. 1851; Scrobipalpa gregori Povolny, 1967; Lita oreocyrniella Petry, 1904; Lita paniculatella Novicki, 1924; Scrobipalpa artemisiella syriaca Povolný, 1967; Scrobipalpa artemisiella mongolensis Povolný, 1969

= Scrobipalpa artemisiella =

Species of moth

Scrobipalpa artemisiella (thyme moth) is a moth of the family Gelechiidae. It is found in most of Europe (except Portugal and Norway), Turkey and Syria through the Caucasus and Central Asia to Irkutsk and Mongolia. It has also been recorded from North America, but this records requires confirmation.

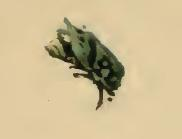
A sprig of Thymus serpyllum eaten by larva

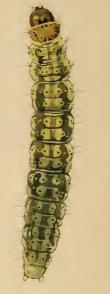
Larva

The wingspan is 10–12 mm. Terminal joint of palpi as long as second or hardly longer. Forewings are dark brown, whitish -sprinkled, more or less streaked longitudinally with ferruginous, dorsal area visually lighter; stigmata somewhat elongate, black, first discal rather beyond plical; usually a black mark on fold beyond plical; some black dots before apex and on termen. Hindwings 1, light grey, darker terminally. The larva is greenish; dorsal and subdorsal lines darker; head pale brown; 2 brown-marked.

Adults are on wing from June to July.

The larvae feed on Thymus praecox arcticus, Thymus pulegioides, Thymus serpyllum and Satureja montana.

== Subspecies ==
- Scrobipalpa artemisiella artemisiella
- Scrobipalpa artemisiella oreocyrniella Petry, 1904 (Sardinia, Corsica)
