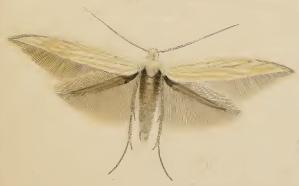

Scientific classification
- Kingdom: Animalia
- Phylum: Arthropoda
- Class: Insecta
- Order: Lepidoptera
- Family: Coleophoridae
- Genus: Coleophora
- Species: C. silenella

Binomial name
- Coleophora silenella Herrich-Schaffer, 1855

Synonyms
- Patzakia dragusanii Nemes, 2004

= Coleophora silenella =

Species of moth

Coleophora silenella is a moth of the family Coleophoridae. It is found in most of Europe, except Fennoscandia, Ireland, Greece, Portugal and Ukraine.

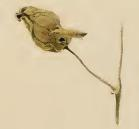
Capsule of Silene vulgaris with larval case attached

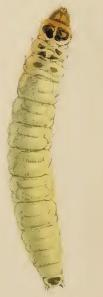
Larva

The wingspan is 14–19 mm (0.55–0.75 in). They are on wing from June to August.

The larvae feed on the seeds of Silene otites, Silene densiflora, Silene nutans, Oberna behen and Viscaria vulgaris.
