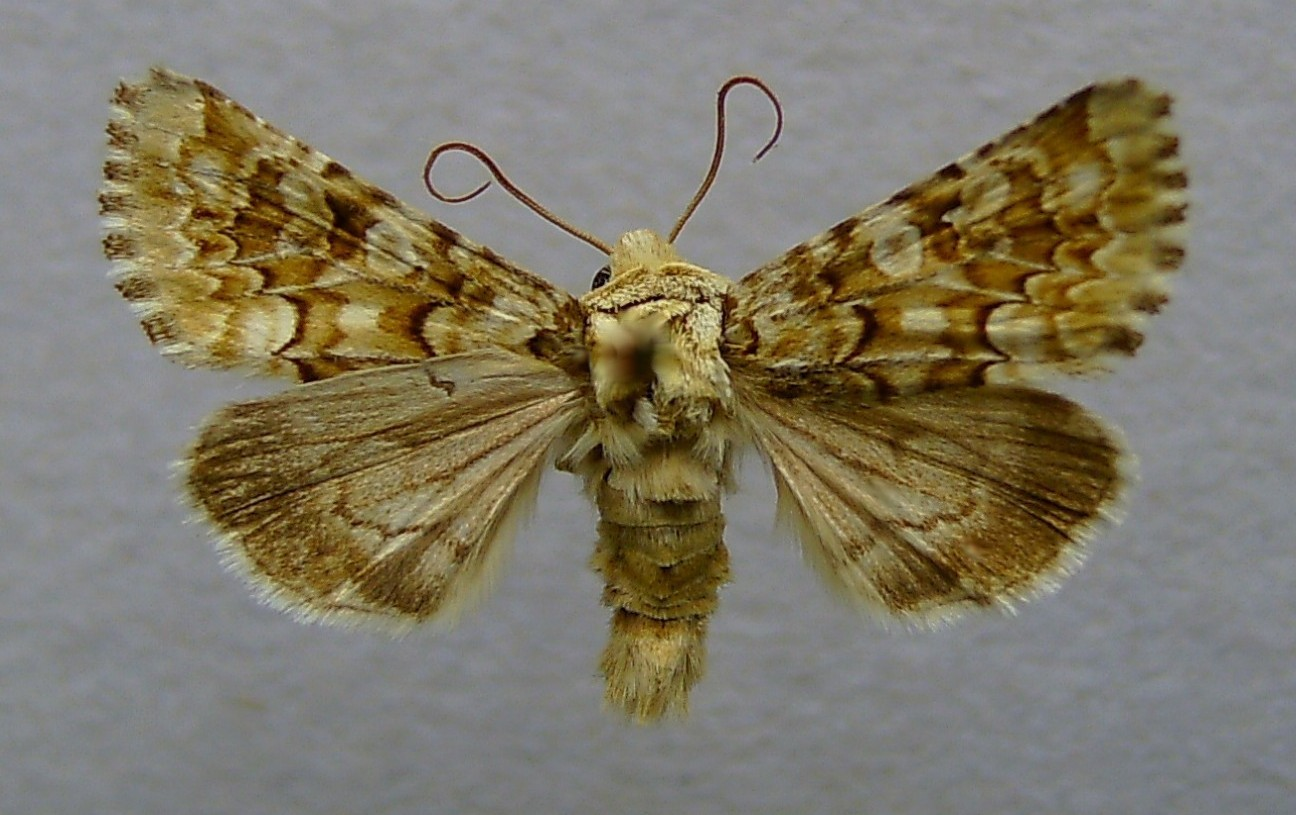

Scientific classification
- Domain: Eukaryota
- Kingdom: Animalia
- Phylum: Arthropoda
- Class: Insecta
- Order: Lepidoptera
- Superfamily: Noctuoidea
- Family: Noctuidae
- Genus: Hadena
- Species: H. irregularis

Binomial name
- Hadena irregularis Hufnagel, 1766

= Hadena irregularis =

Species of moth

The Viper's Bugloss (Hadena irregularis) is a species of moth of the family Noctuidae. It is found in Europe.

The wingspan is 32–36 mm. Meyrick describes it - Forewings whitish-ochreous, irregularly suffused with pale ochreous brownish; first and second lines edged externally with ochreous brownish, internally with dark brown; median line ochreous brown; orbicular and reniform outlined with pale; subterminal line pale, edged anteriorly with ochreous-brown; termen unmarked; cilia barred. Hindwings are light fuscous, with darker postmedian line and subterminal band. In the larvae, yellow grey coloured specimens predominate. They have brownish lateral and dorsal lines and darker angled spots that open to the front of the dorsum. The reddish-brown pupa has two short, curved tips on the cremaster. The moth flies from July to August depending on the location.

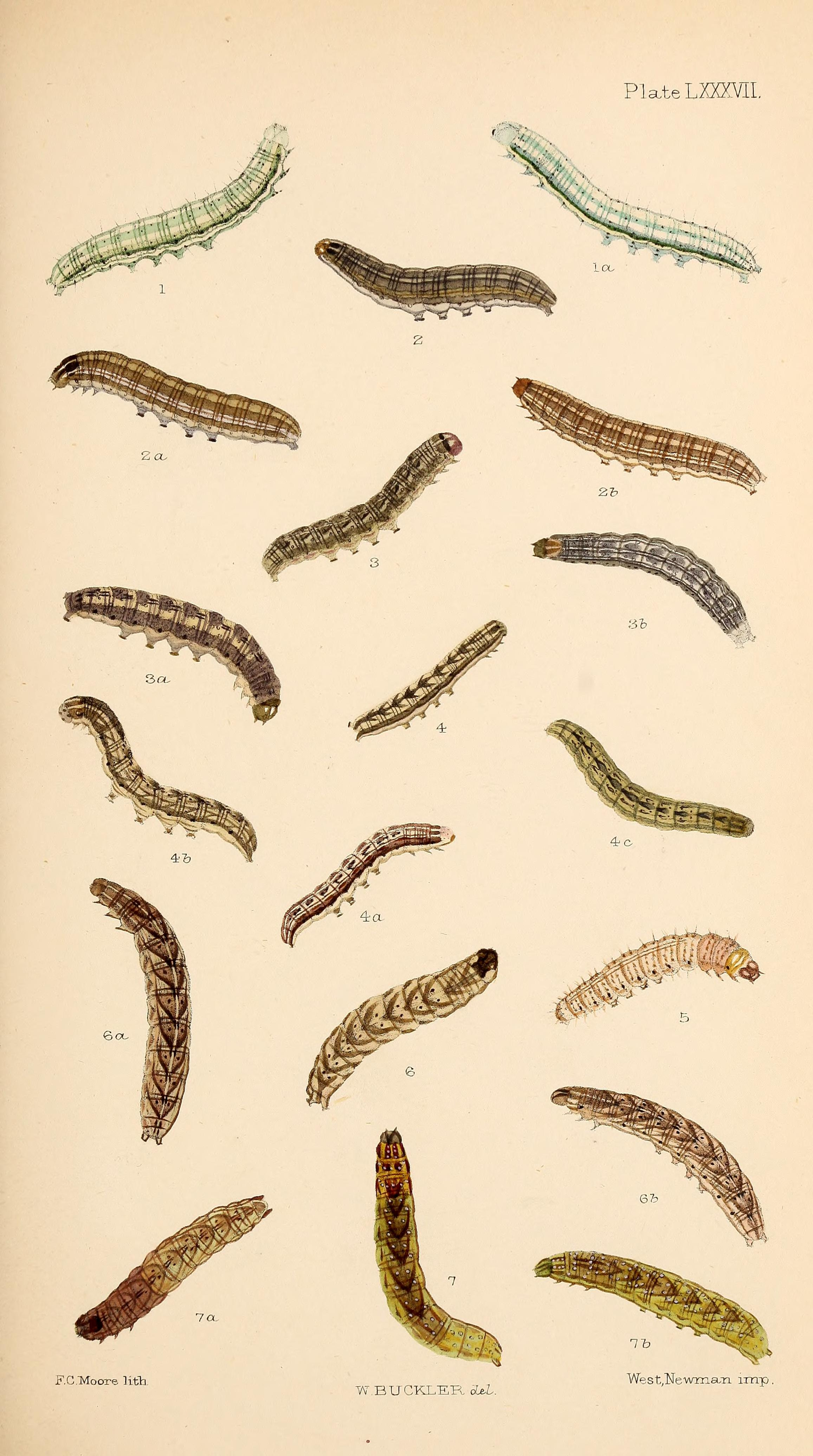
Figs. 4, 4a, 4b, 4 c larvae in various stagesof growth

The larvae feed on Silene otites (in the seed-capsules) and Gypsophila species.

In 1998 the United Kingdom government removed Hadena irregularis from schedule 5 (animals) of the Wildlife and Countryside Act, 1981 as it is believed to be extinct. The cause of extinction has been hypothesised to be destruction of habitat, primarily the food source, which in the United Kingdom was limited to Spanish catchfly (Silene otites).
