= Maidscross Hill =

Hill in Suffolk, England

Coordinates: 52.41°N 0.54°E

- Site of Special Scientific Interest
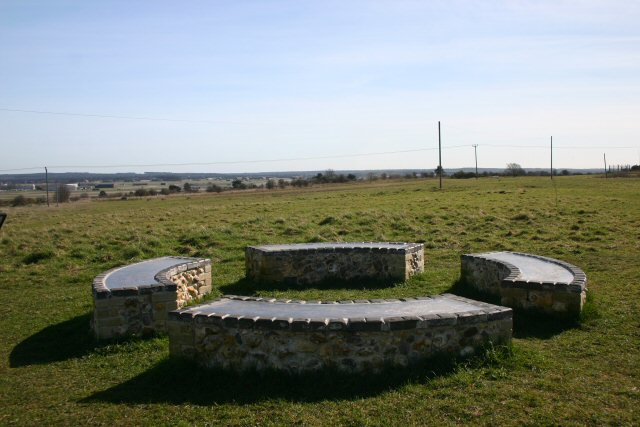
- Sculpture by Anita Rivera at Maidscross Hill
- Location of Maidscross Hill.
- Area of search: Suffolk
- Grid reference: TL 728 823
- Interest: Biological
- Area: 44.8 hectares
- Notification date: 1986
- Location map: Magic Map

Maidscross Hill is a 44.8-hectare (111-acre) biological Site of Special Scientific Interest on the eastern outskirts of Lakenheath in Suffolk. It is a Nature Conservation Review site, Grade I, and a larger surrounding area of 49.8 hectares is managed as a Local Nature Reserve.

This very dry grassland has four nationally rare plants, Breckland wild thyme, Spanish catchfly, grape hyacinth and sickle medick. The site is not grazed, which has allowed invasion by bracken and scrub, but also increased the nesting sites for birds.

There is access from Broom Road and Maids Cross Hill.

Part of the land within Maidscross Hill SSSI is owned by the Ministry of Defence.
