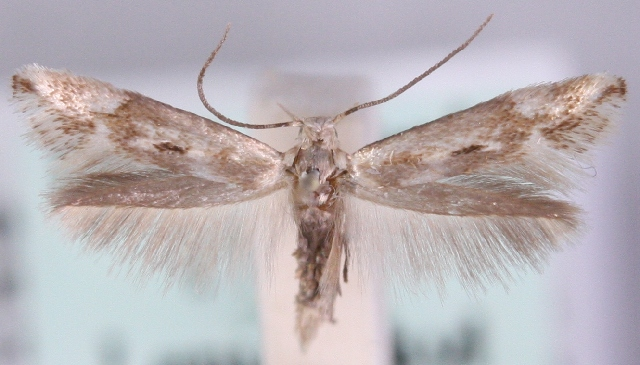

Scientific classification
- Kingdom: Animalia
- Phylum: Arthropoda
- Class: Insecta
- Order: Lepidoptera
- Family: Elachistidae
- Genus: Elachista
- Species: E. scirpi

Binomial name
- Elachista scirpi Stainton, 1887

Synonyms
- Biselachista scirpi; Biselachista margaretae Traugott-Olsen, 1994

= Elachista scirpi =

Species of moth

Elachista scirpi is a moth of the family Elachistidae found in Europe.

== Description ==
The wingspan is 10–12 millimetres (0.39–0.47 in). The head is grey-whitish. Forewings are as in E. rhynchosporella, but fuscous markings more undefined, apex of fascia not distinctly produced, a distinct minute black apical dot. Hindwings are rather dark grey. The larva is pale greenish -yellow dorsal line indistinct; head pale yellow grey.

Adults are on wing from June to August.

The larvae feed on round-fruited rush (Juncus compressus), saltmarsh rush (Juncus gerardii) and sea club-rush (Bolboschoenus maritimus). They mine the leaves of their host plant. Larvae can be found from early March to early May.

== Distribution ==
It is found from Fennoscandia to Portugal, Sardinia and Sicily and from Ireland to Romania.
