= Breckland Forest =

Protected areas in east England

Coordinates: 52.4°N 0.7°E

- Site of Special Scientific Interest
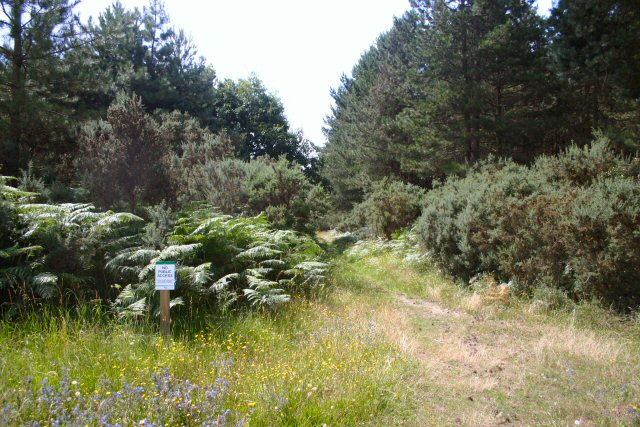
- Location of Breckland Forest.
- Area of search: Norfolk, England; Suffolk, England
- Grid reference: TL 822 872
- Interest: Biological; Geological
- Area: 18,126 hectares
- Notification date: 2000
- Location map: Magic Map

Breckland Forest is an 18,126 hectare biological and geological Site of Special Scientific Interest in many separate areas between Swaffham in Norfolk and Bury St Edmunds in Suffolk, England. It is part of the Breckland Special Protection Area under the European Union Directive on the Conservation of Wild Birds. It contains two Geological Conservation Review sites, Beeches Pit, Icklingham and High Lodge. Barton Mills Valley is a Local Nature Reserve in the south-west corner of the site.

Woodlarks and nightjars breed on this site in internationally important numbers. There are also several nationally rare vascular plants and invertebrates on the IUCN Red List of Threatened Species. Geological sites provide evidence of the environmental and human history of East Anglia during the Middle Pleistocene.

Major landowners that own land within Breckland Forest SSSI include the Ministry of Defence, the Forestry Commission and the Crown Estate.
