= National nature reserves in Suffolk =

National nature reserves in Suffolk, England are established by Natural England and managed by them or by non-governmental organisations such as the Royal Society for the Protection of Birds, the National Trust or the Suffolk Wildlife Trust.

== List of reserves ==
A list of national nature reserves in Suffolk:

- Benacre NNR - in The Broads National Park
- Bradfield Woods NNR
- Cavenham Heath
- Orfordness-Havergate NNR
- Redgrave and Lopham Fen NNR (shared between Norfolk and Suffolk)
- Thetford Heath NNR
- Walberswick NNR
- Westleton Heath NNR

== See also ==
- List of Sites of Special Scientific Interest in Suffolk
- List of Local Nature Reserves in Suffolk
- Suffolk Wildlife Trust
