= Bramford Meadows =

Local nature reserve in Bramford, Suffolk, England

Coordinates: 52.076°N 1.104°E

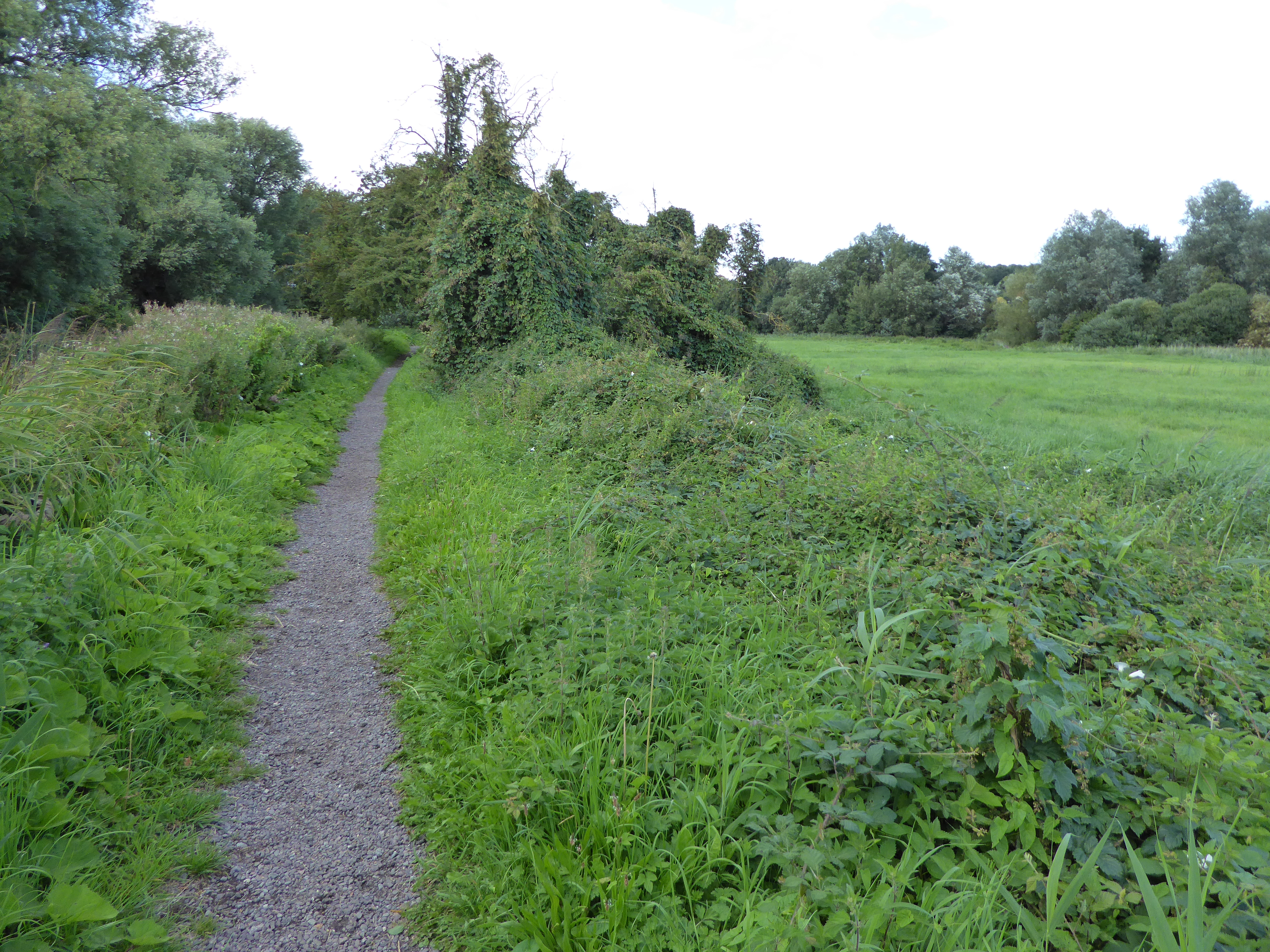
- Interactive map of Bramford Meadows
- Type: Local Nature Reserve
- Location: Bramford, Suffolk
- OS grid: TM 128465
- Area: 9.0 hectares (22 acres)
- Manager: Bramford Openspaces Ltd

Bramford Meadows is a nine hectare Local Nature Reserve in Bramford, on the western outskirts of Ipswich in Suffolk. It is owned by Bramford Parish Council and managed by Bramford Openspaces Ltd.

This site on the east bank of the River Gipping has grassland and scrub, and it is crossed by wet ditches and the former course of the river. Flora in the ditches includes: water forget me not, water mint, brooklime and water figwort.

There is access from Ship Lane.
