= Sudbury Common Lands =

Local nature reserve in Suffolk, England

Coordinates: 52.04°N 0.72°E

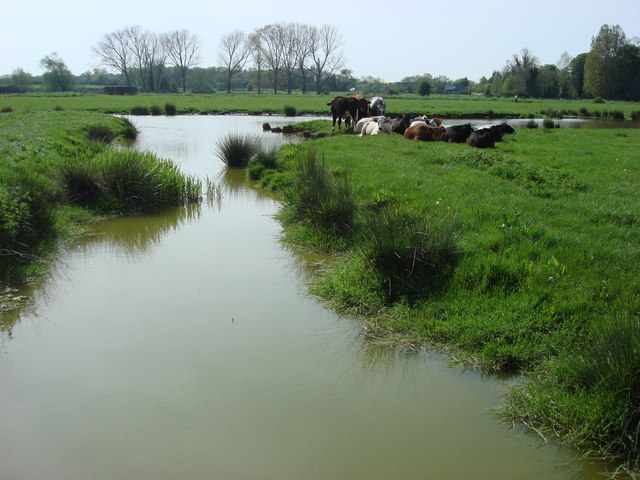
- Interactive map of Sudbury Common Lands
- Type: Local Nature Reserve
- Location: Sudbury, Suffolk
- OS grid: TM 868 417
- Area: 50.3 hectares (124 acres)
- Manager: Sudbury Common Lands Charity

Sudbury Common Lands is a 50.3 hectare Local Nature Reserve in Sudbury in Suffolk. It is owned and managed by the Sudbury Common Lands Charity.

This site has ancient wetland with ponds and ditches, and there are locally uncommon species such as flowering rush, tubular water-dropwort and round-fruited rush. There is also grassland which has never been ploughed, and it has diverse grasses and wildflowers.

There is access from Melford Road.
