= Leathes Ham =

Nature reserve in Lowestoft, Suffolk, England

Coordinates: 52.479°N 1.726°E

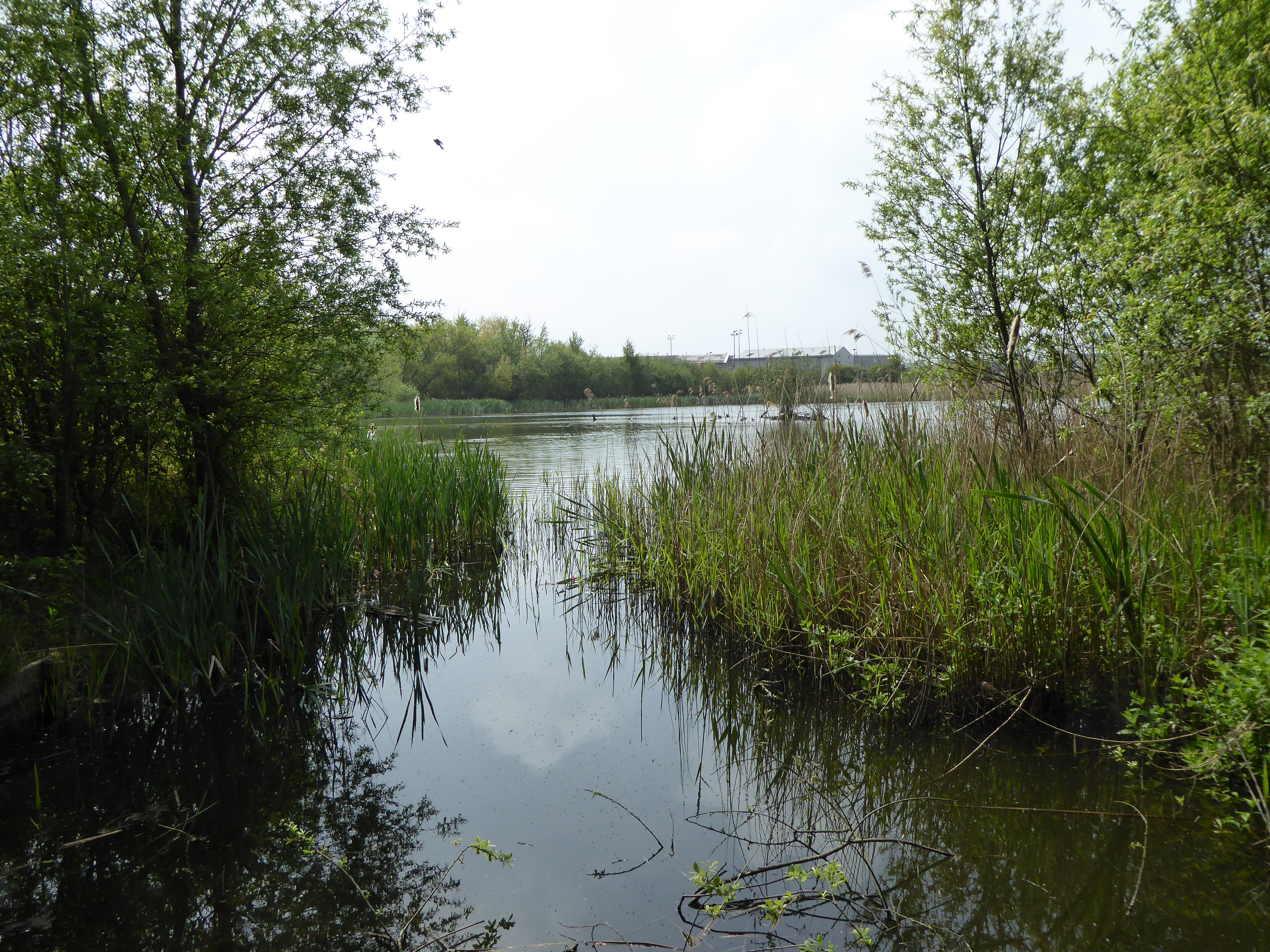
- Interactive map of Leathes Ham
- Type: Local Nature Reserve
- Location: Lowestoft, Suffolk
- OS grid: TM 531 933
- Area: 6.0 hectares (15 acres)

Leathes Ham is a 6 hectare Local Nature Reserve in Lowestoft in Suffolk. It is owned by Waveney District Council.

In the medieval period this site was turbary, an area which was dug for peat, and it later flooded and became a lake. It has a reedbed, dykes, and marshes where wildfowl breed. Flora include ragged robin and southern marsh orchid.

There is access from Normanston Park.
