= List of regionally important geological/geomorphological sites (RIGS) in Kent =

This is a list of the Regionally Important Geological / Geomorphological Sites (RIGS) in Kent as recorded by GeoConservation Kent.

- Aylesford Pit
- Beacon Wood Country Park
- Bensted's (or Iguanodon) Quarry
- Betteshanger Sustainable Parks with Relic Cliff
- Blaise Farm Quarry
- Bluewater Quarry (Stone Castle Quarry)
- Bores Hole, Halling
- Bramling Quarry, Ickham
- Charing Chalk Pit
- Charing Sandpit
- Chartham Hatch Pit
- Chislet Colliery Tip
- Cooper's Pit, Canterbury
- Ditton Court Quarry
- Doddington Chalk Pit, Torry Hill
- Dunton Green Quarry
- Fort Amherst, Chatham
- Francis Chalk Quarry, Cliffe
- Halling Chalk Pit
- Hay's Depot Yard
- Hosey Common Quarry
- Laker House Quarry Face, Maidstone
- Long Rock Area, Tankerton
- Loose Quarry, Quarry Wood
- Loose Valley - Karstic Features
- Lower Culand Pit, Burham
- Monkton Nature Reserve
- Oldbury Hill, Ightham
- Pegwell Bay - Infilled Dry Valley
- Peter's Pit, Wouldham
- Pluckley Brickworks Clay Pit
- Quarry Wood, West Farleigh
- Scotney Castle Quarry
- Snowdown Colliery Tip
- St. Peter's Quarry
- Stone Cliff, Stone-in-Oxney
- Tilmanstone Colliery Tip
- Wagon's Pit, Aylesford

== Gallery ==
Cooper's Pit, Canterbury

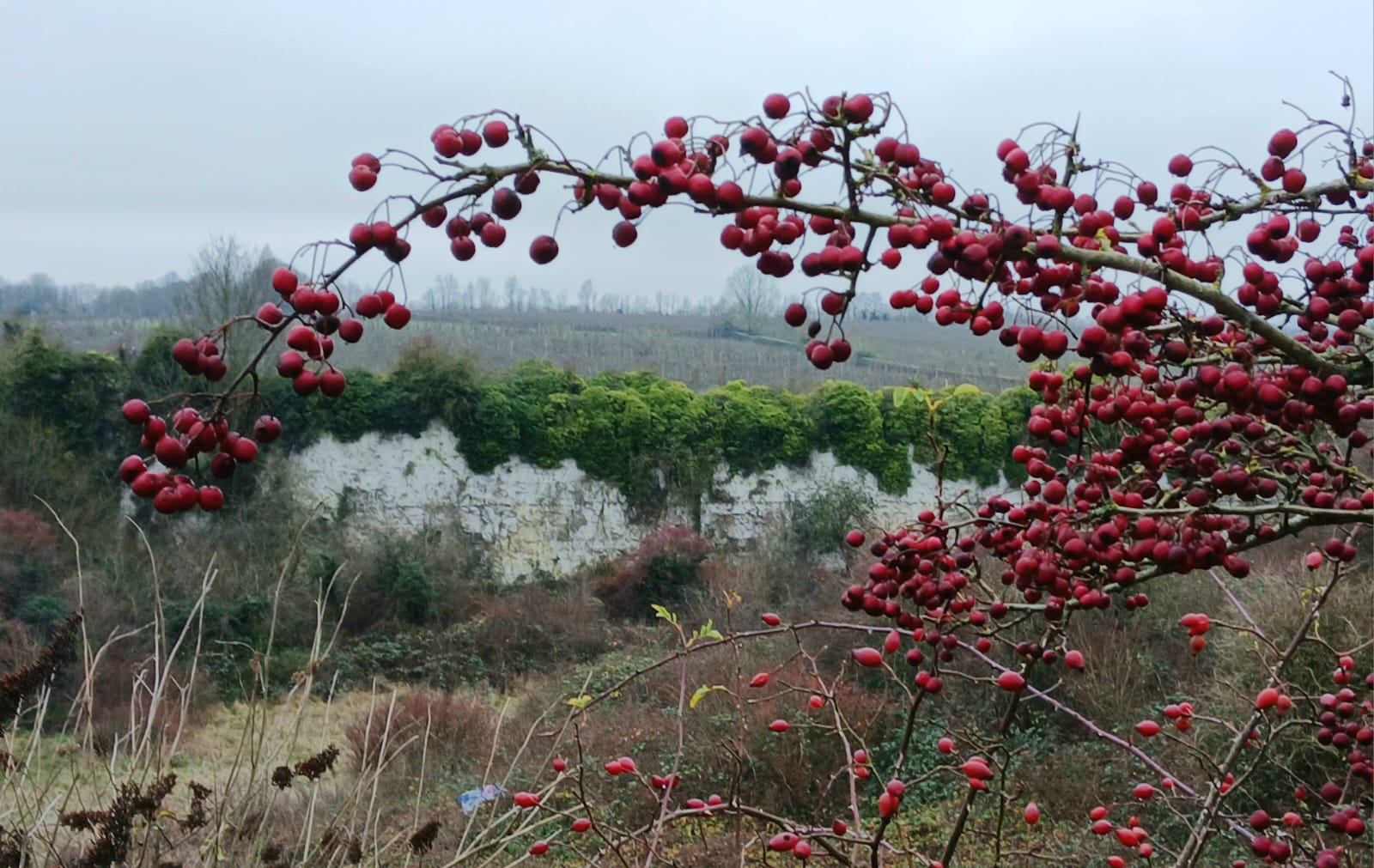
Cooper's Pit, Canterbury

Cooper's Pit, Canterbury

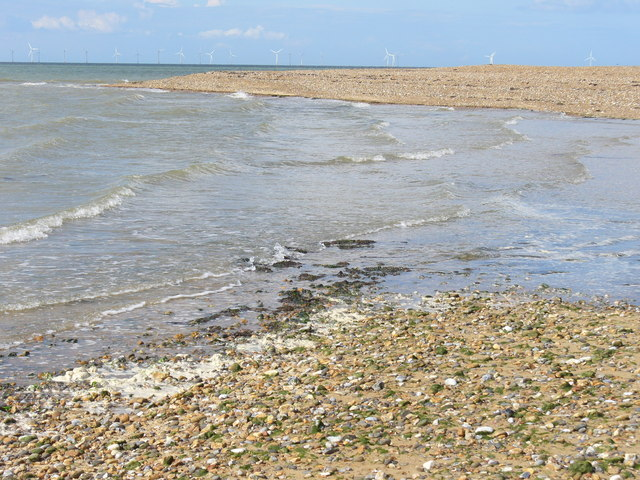
Long Rock, Tankerton

Dunton Green Chalk Quarry

Charing Sand Pit

Blaise Farm Quarry
