= Spring Wood, Belstead =

Nature reserve in Suffolk, England

Coordinates: 52.029°N 1.124°E

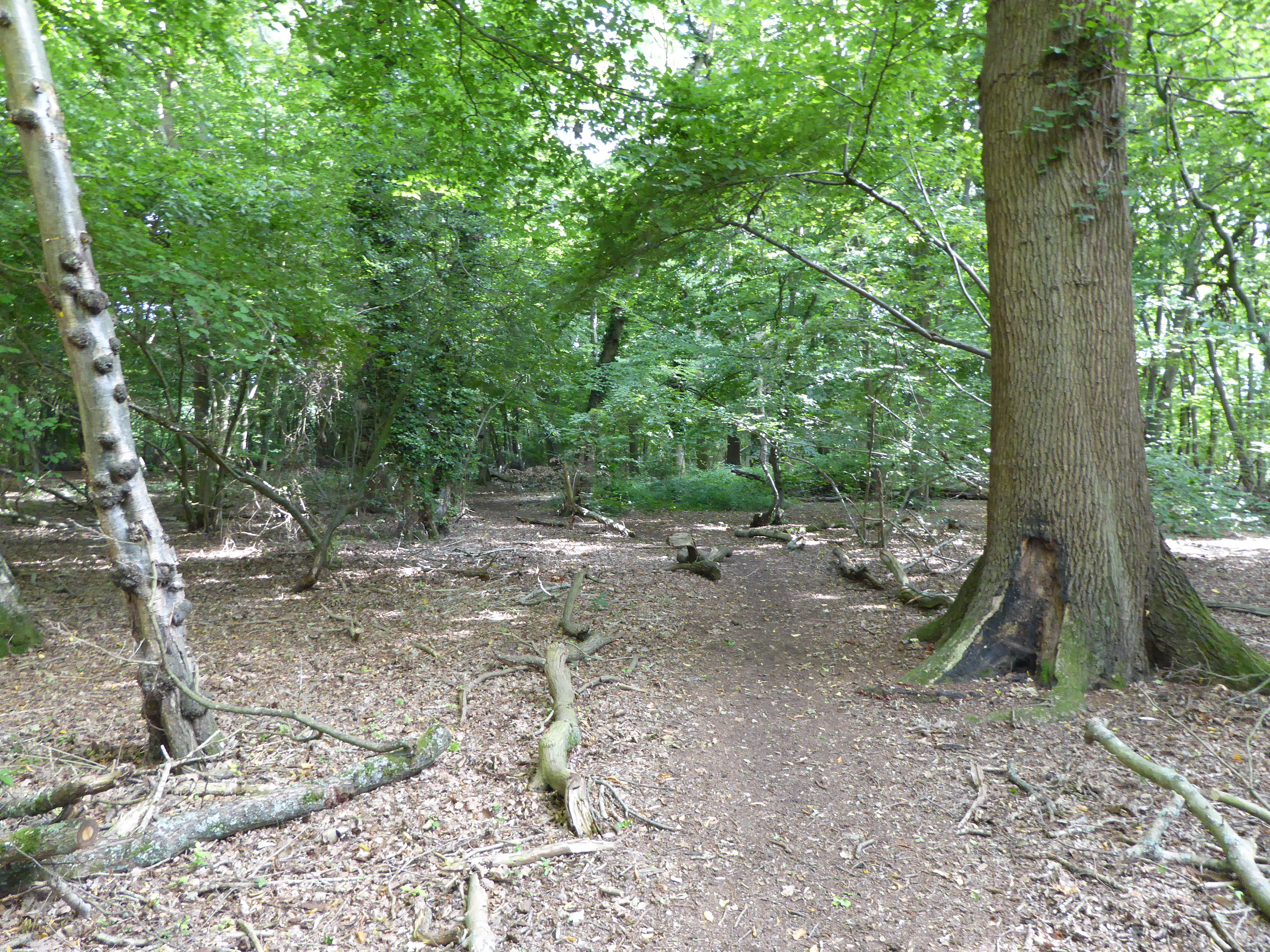
- Interactive map of Spring Wood, Belstead
- Type: Local Nature Reserve
- Location: Ipswich, Suffolk
- OS grid: TM144413
- Area: 5.5 hectares (14 acres)
- Manager: Greenways Project, Ipswich Borough Council

Spring Wood is a 5.5 hectare Local Nature Reserve east of Belstead, on the southern outskirts of Ipswich in Suffolk. It is owned and managed by Ipswich Borough Council.

This ancient oak and hornbeam wood has an understorey of hazel. There are small-leaved limes in groups several metres in diameter, which are genetically one tree, as a result of coppicing decades ago.

There is access from the neighbouring Millennium Wood and by a footpath from Bobbits Lane.
