= Barton Mills Valley =

Nature reserve in Suffolk, England

Coordinates: 52.337°N 0.525°E

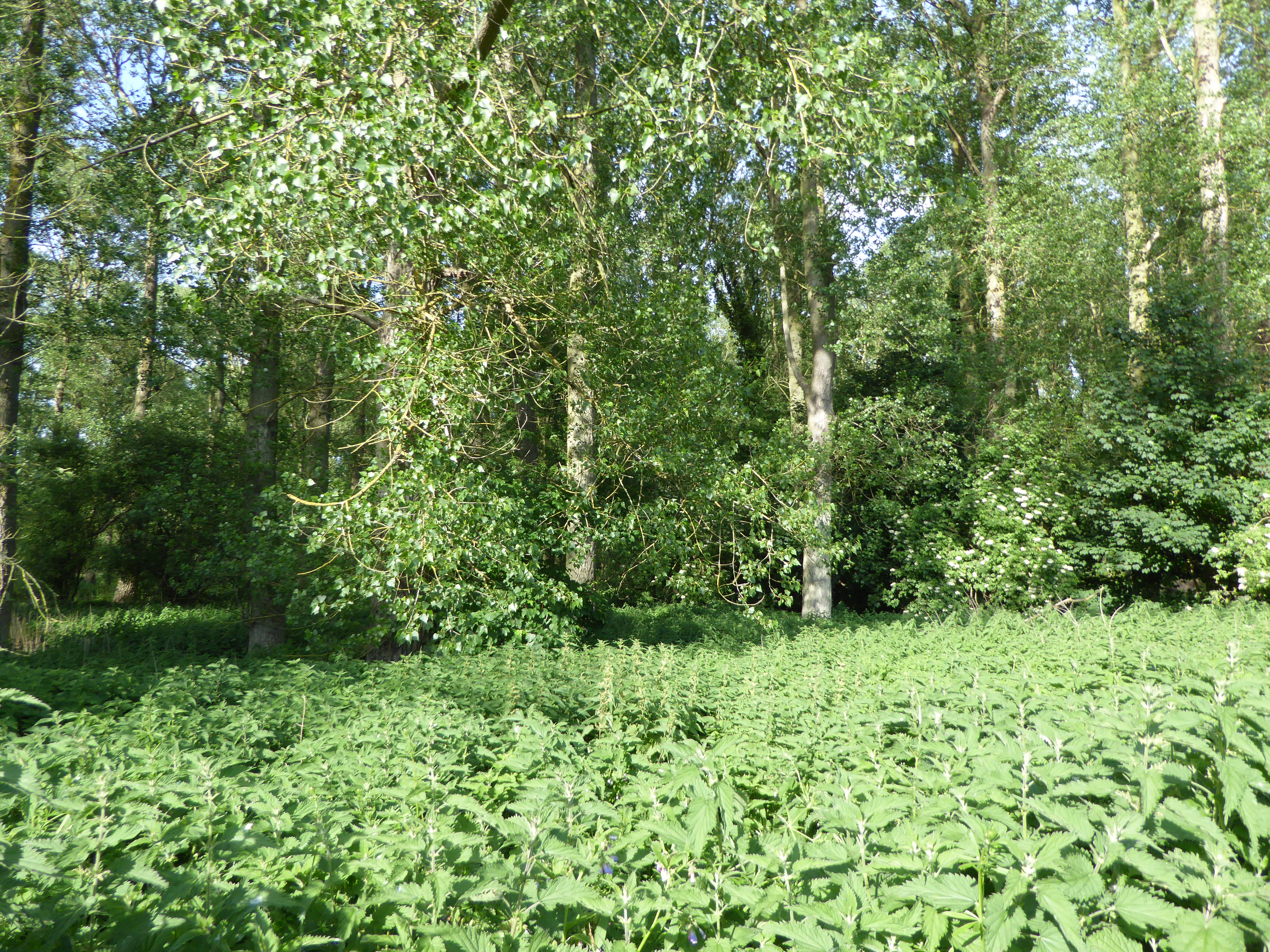
- Interactive map of Barton Mills Valley
- Type: Local Nature Reserve
- Location: Mildenhall, Suffolk
- OS grid: TL 721 740
- Area: 10.7 hectares (26 acres)
- Manager: Forest Heath District Council

Barton Mills Valley is a 10.7 hectare Local Nature Reserve in Mildenhall in Suffolk. It is owned and managed by West Suffolk Council. The site is in Breckland Forest biological Site of Special Scientific Interest.

This diverse site has reedbeds, alder carr, willow carr and sedge areas. There are picnic benches, a car park and disabled access.
