= Regionally important geological site =

Regionally important geological and geomorphological sites (RIGS) are locally designated sites of local, national and regional importance for geodiversity (geology and geomorphology) in the United Kingdom and Isle of Man. These sites are also known by other names, such as regionally important geological sites, Regionally Important Geodiversity Sites (especially in Wales), County Geodiversity Sites in Norfolk, Local Geodiversity Sites in Scotland and Lancashire, and as County Geology Sites in Cornwall and Devon and in Ireland

== Designation ==
RIGS may be designated for their value to Earth Science, and to Earth heritage in general, and may include cultural, educational, historical and aesthetic resources. The concept was introduced by the Nature Conservancy Council's publication Earth Science Conservation in Great Britain – A Strategy (1990). They are conserved and protected from development as a material consideration through the planning system by the Town and Country Planning Act 1990. They do not have the statutory management protection enjoyed by Sites of Special Scientific Interest (SSSIs) or Areas of Special Scientific Interest (Isle of Man).

== Local Sites ==
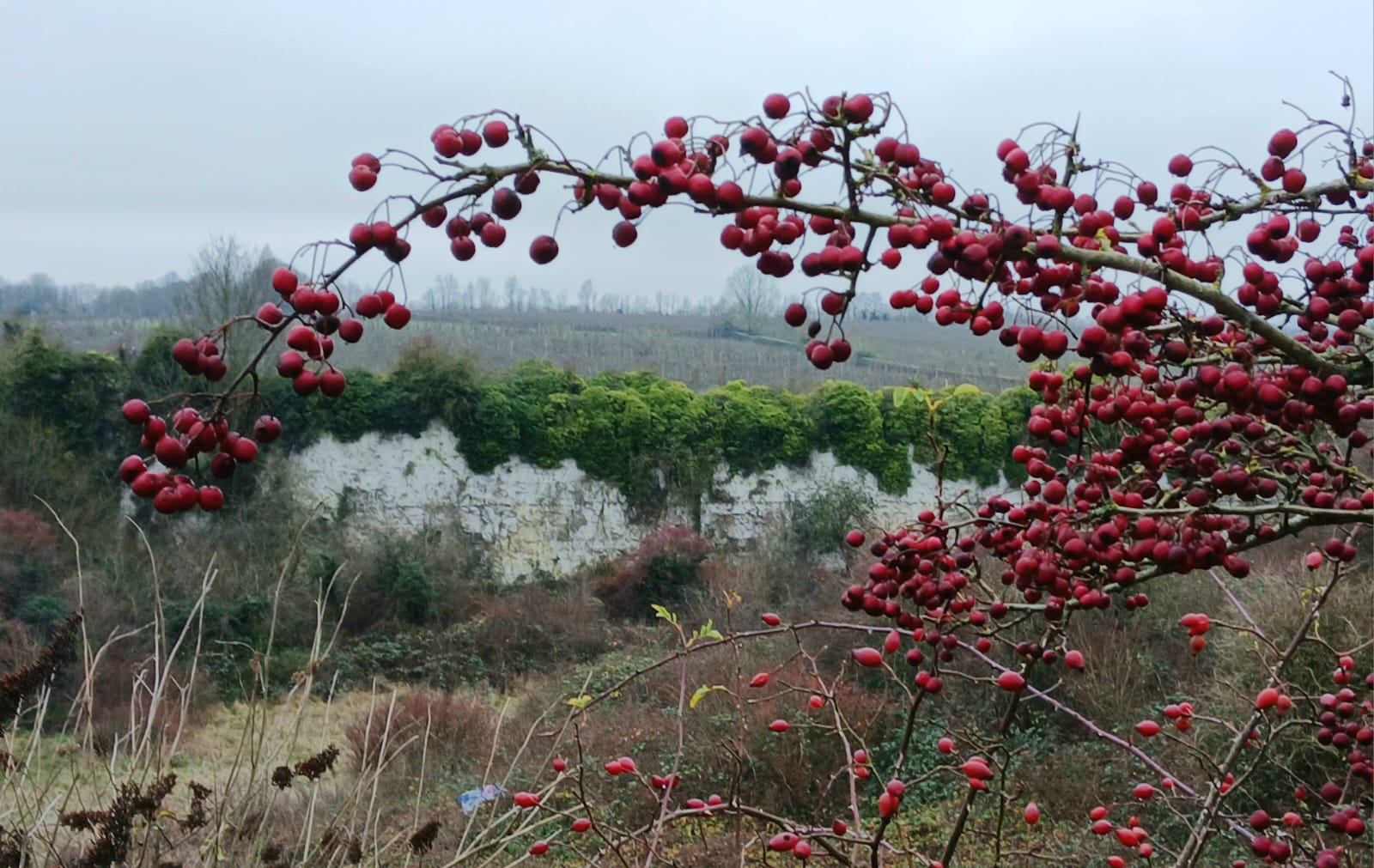
Cooper’s Pit, RIGS in Wincheap, Canterbury, Kent.

Local geological sites including RIGS are locally designated. In many areas the selection and designation process relies on significant amounts of volunteer effort. Once designated through notification to the local planning authority, they are conserved and protected as a material consideration through local and national planning policies.

There are currently over 50 geoconservation groups, plus 2 associated organisations, as members of GeoconservationUK. As of 2018 there was a 30 site candidate list, of Regionally Important Geodiversity Sites, for the Isle of Man.

== Planning policies ==
RIGS are treated by the UK government's 'Planning Policy Statement 9: Biodiversity and Geological Conservation' (ODPM 2005) (known as PPS9) under the category of regional and local sites. For more information about locally designated nature conservation sites in England see 'Local Sites - Guidance on the Identification, Selection and Management' (DEFRA, 2006). In England Local Authorities reported on the management of RIGS through the Local Sites National Indicator NI197 reporting to DEFRA until 31 March 2011, when this was changed to 160-01 reporting to DEFRA as part of the single data list.

Depending on the decisions of the members of the local sites partnership, in some local areas locally designated sites including RIGS with substantive geological interest may now be called local geological sites (LGS).

== See also ==
- List of regionally important geological/geomorphological sites (RIGS) in Cumbria
- List of regionally important geological/geomorphological sites (RIGS) in Kent
- List of regionally important geological/geomorphological sites (RIGS) in Suffolk
