= Gunton Warren and Corton Woods =

Nature reserve in Lowestoft, Suffolk, England

Coordinates: 52.501°N 1.751°E

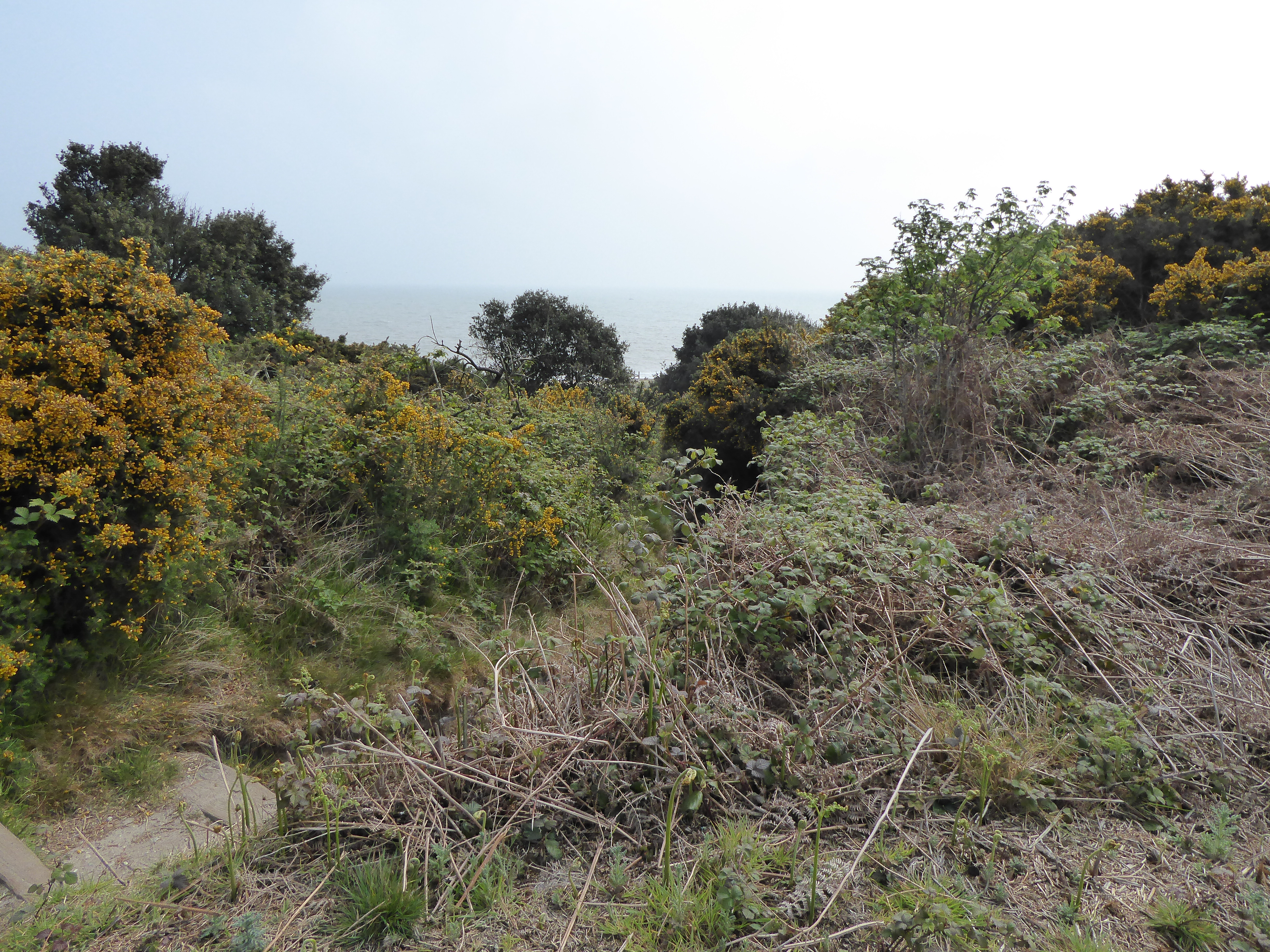
- Gunton Warren
- Interactive map of Gunton Warren and Corton Woods
- Type: Local Nature Reserve
- Location: Lowestoft, Suffolk
- OS grid: TM 547 959
- Area: 31.9 hectares (79 acres)
- Manager: Suffolk Wildlife Trust and Corton Woods Project

Gunton Warren and Corton Woods is a 31.9 hectare Local Nature Reserve in Lowestoft in Suffolk. The site is owned by Waveney District Council, and Gunton Warren is managed by the Suffolk Wildlife Trust while Corton Woods are managed by local volunteers of the Corton Woods Project.

Gunton Warren is a coastal site which has sand dunes, shingle, lowland heath and cliff slopes. Birds include rare migrants including icterines and yellow-browed warblers. Corton Woods has mature trees and diverse flora such as lesser celandine, bee orchids and common spotted orchids.

There is access to both sites from Corton Road.
