= Aspal Close =

Nature reserve in Suffolk, England

Coordinates: 52.369°N 0.493°E

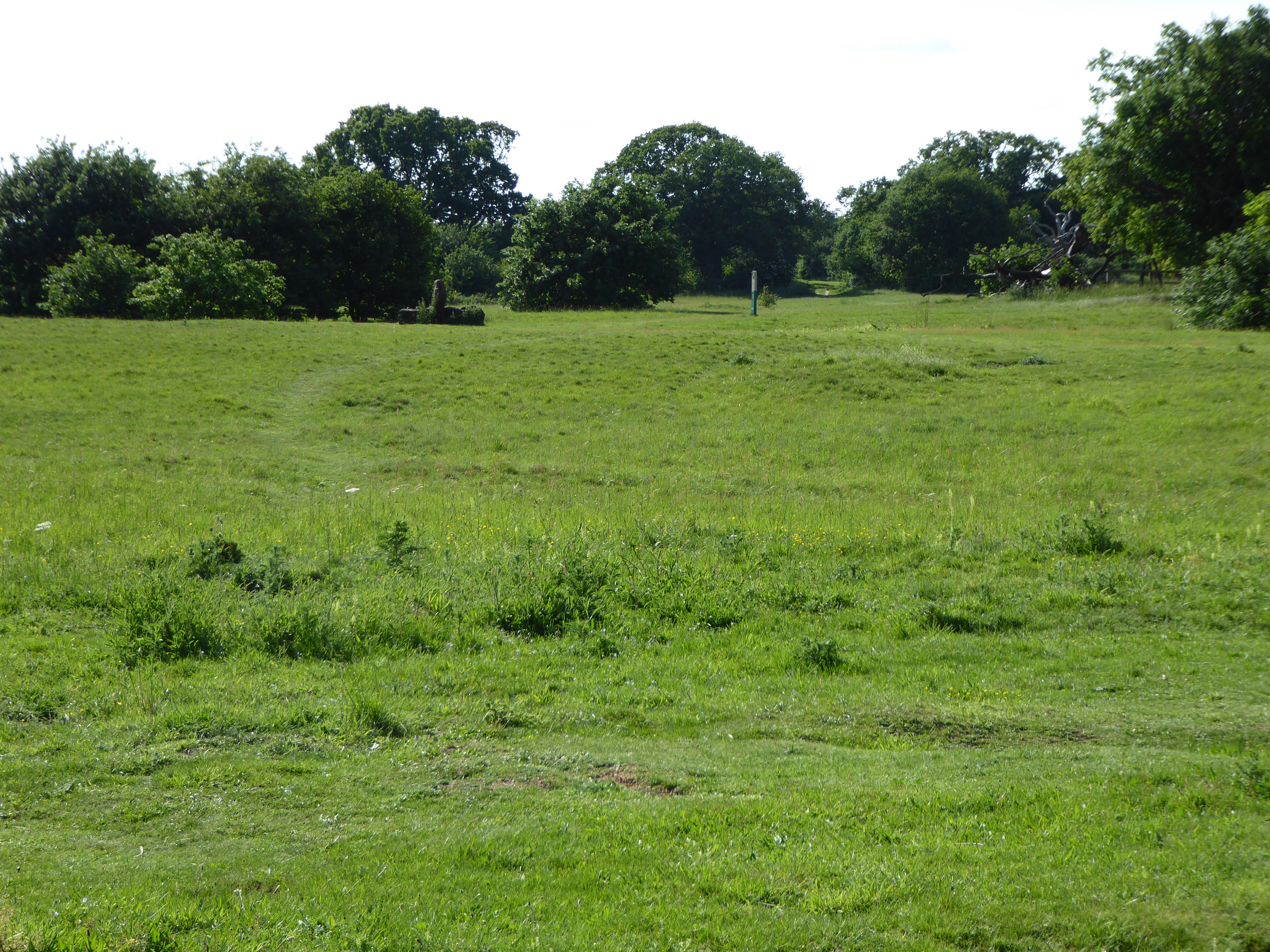
- Interactive map of Aspal Close
- Type: Local Nature Reserve
- Location: Beck Row, Suffolk
- OS grid: TL 698 775
- Area: 18.9 hectares (47 acres)
- Manager: Forest Heath District Council and Aspal Close Management Committee

Aspal Close is an 18.9 hectare Local Nature Reserve in Beck Row in Suffolk. It is owned by West Suffolk District Council and managed by the council together with Aspal Close Management Committee.

This site has grassland, woodland and scrub. Almost 300 plant species and six bats have been recorded, and there are around 200 ancient oaks, some of which may be 1,000 years old. There is a car park and a football pitch. The site is protected by Fields in Trust through a legal "Deed of Dedication" safeguarding the future of the space as public recreation land for future generations to enjoy.

There is access from St John Street.
