= Rede Wood =

Nature reserve in Suffolk, England

Coordinates: 52.112°N 1.143°E

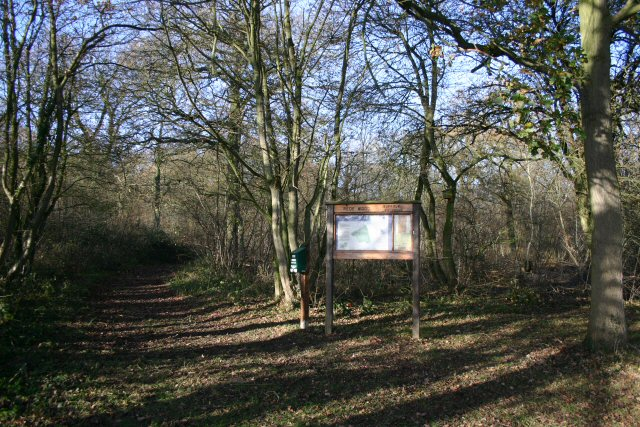
- Interactive map of Rede Wood
- Type: Local Nature Reserve
- Location: Claydon, Suffolk
- OS grid: TM 153 506
- Area: 7.5 hectares (19 acres)
- Manager: Private owner

Rede Wood is a 7.5 hectare Local Nature Reserve east of Claydon in Suffolk, England. It was formerly owned by Suffolk County Council, which sold it to a private owner in 2012. It is managed under an agreement between the owner and the council.

This semi-natural wood on boulder clay is mainly pedunculate oak and ash, with a coppiced understorey mainly of hazel. The flora includes 38 species indicative of ancient woodland.

There is access by footpaths from Claydon and Henley.
