= Bridge Wood =

Nature reserve in Suffolk, United Kingdom

Coordinates: 52.019°N 1.184°E

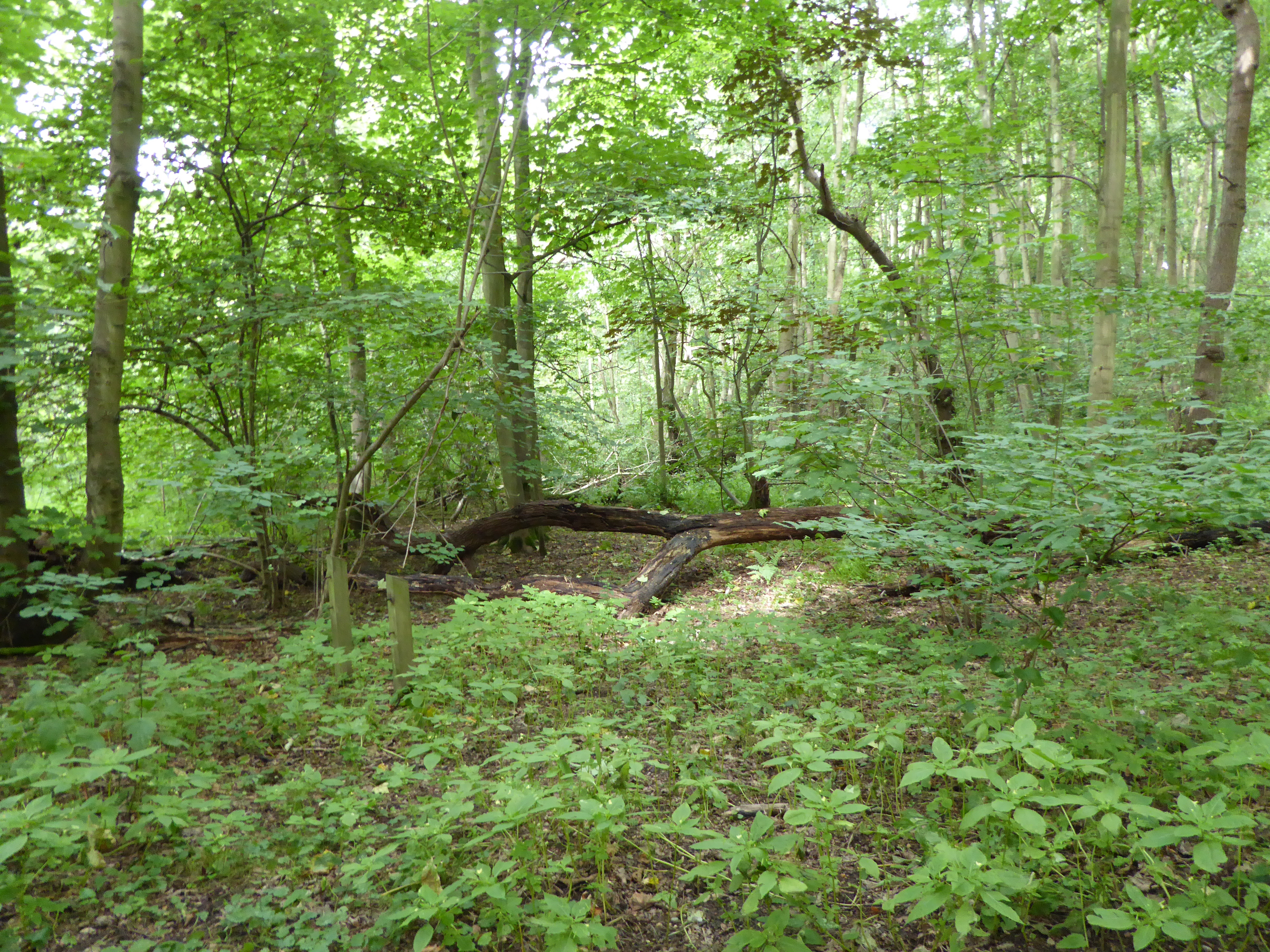
- Interactive map of Bridge Wood
- Type: Local Nature Reserve
- Location: Ipswich, Suffolk
- OS grid: TM 186 404
- Area: 31.0 hectares (77 acres)
- Manager: Ipswich Borough Council

Bridge Wood is a 31 hectare Local Nature Reserve on the southern outskirts of Ipswich in Suffolk, England. It is owned and managed by Ipswich Borough Council, and is part of Orwell Country Park.

One theory about the name Bridge Wood is that it might refer to an old Roman crossing point known as a "bridge". An artificial band of shale can see at low tide near the present Orwell Bridge and this may have been crossable in the past.

This site has been managed as woodland at least since 1600, and it has several ancient oaks. There are also areas of pine, which are being thinned to create a more mixed woodland.

There is access from the Stour and Orwell Walk, which goes through the wood.
