= Cavenham Heath =

National Nature Reserve in Suffolk, England

Coordinates: 52°19′31″N 0°34′05″E

Cavenham Heath is a National Nature Reserve, near Cavenham, Suffolk. It is both a Regionally Important Geological/Geomorphological Sites (RIGS) and a Site of Special Scientific Interest.

Excavations were conducted at Cavenham Heath, yielding an ancient timber structure with a central footing, clay floor walls, and painted plaster, dating from the Iron Age to the 4th century AD. Archaeologists uncovered votive material, including fragments of leaf-plaques and brooches, as well as ceremonial apparel, such as a chain-headdress and diadems.
