= Bugg's Hole Fen, Thelnetham =

Biological Site of Special Scientific Interest in Suffolk, England

Coordinates: 52.373°N 0.944°E

- Site of Special Scientific Interest
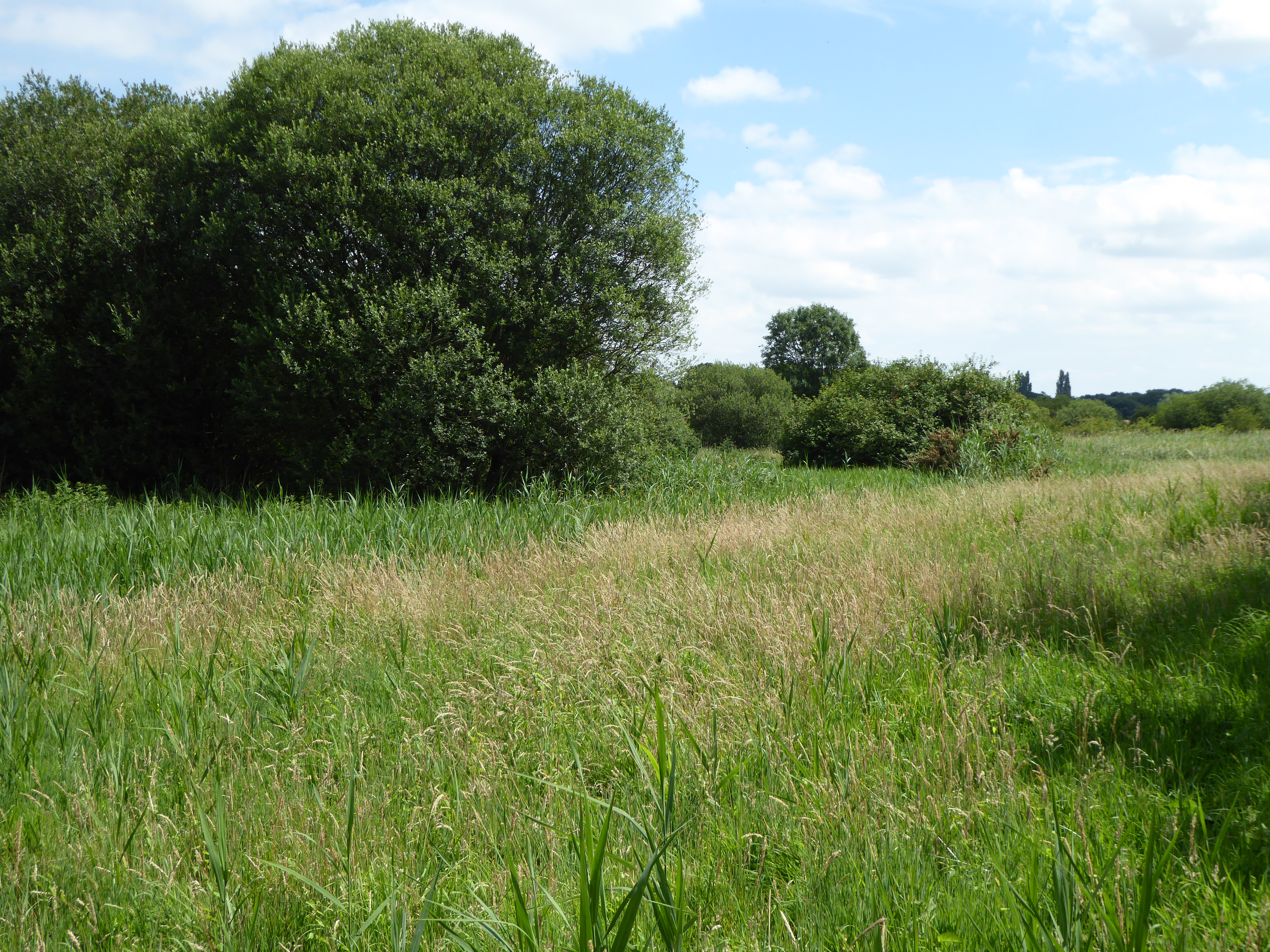
- Location of Bugg's Hole Fen, Thelnetham.
- Area of search: Suffolk
- Grid reference: TM 005 791
- Interest: Biological
- Area: 3.7 hectares
- Notification date: 1984
- Location map: Magic Map

Bugg's Hole Fen is a 3.7-hectare (9.1-acre) biological Site of Special Scientific Interest north-west of Thelnetham in Suffolk.

This calcareous fen in the valley of the River Little Ouse has a range of habitats. Fen grassland has flora such as grass of parnassus and bog pimpernel, there are southern marsh orchid and marsh pennywort in marsh grassland, and spring-fed tall fen has lesser water parsnip.

The site is private land with no public access.
