= Haverhill Railway Walks =

Nature reserve in Suffolk, England

Coordinates: 52.08°N 0.46°E

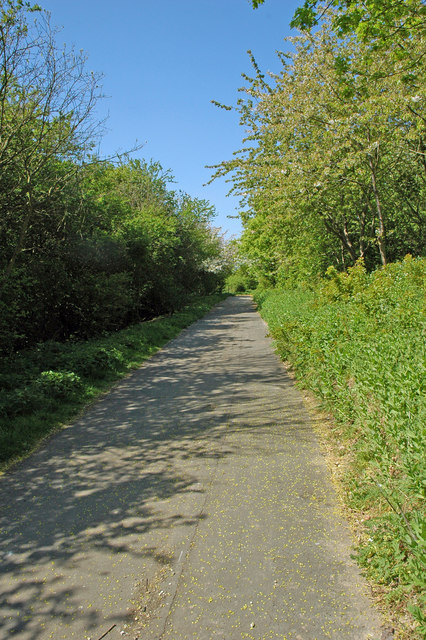
- Interactive map of Haverhill Railway Walks
- Type: Local Nature Reserve
- Location: Haverhill, Suffolk
- OS grid: TL 686 448
- Area: 14.1 hectares (35 acres)
- Manager: St Edmundsbury Borough Council

Haverhill Railway Walks is a 14.1 hectare Local Nature Reserve in Haverhill in Suffolk. It is owned and managed by West Suffolk Council.

This is a footpath along a three mile stretch of a closed section of the Stour Valley Railway. Much of it is covered with scrub and large trees, and it provides a wildlife corridor for a diverse range of fauna and flora through the centre of Haverhill.
