= Riverside Walk, Hadleigh =

Nature reserve in Suffolk, England

Coordinates: 52.043°N 0.948°E

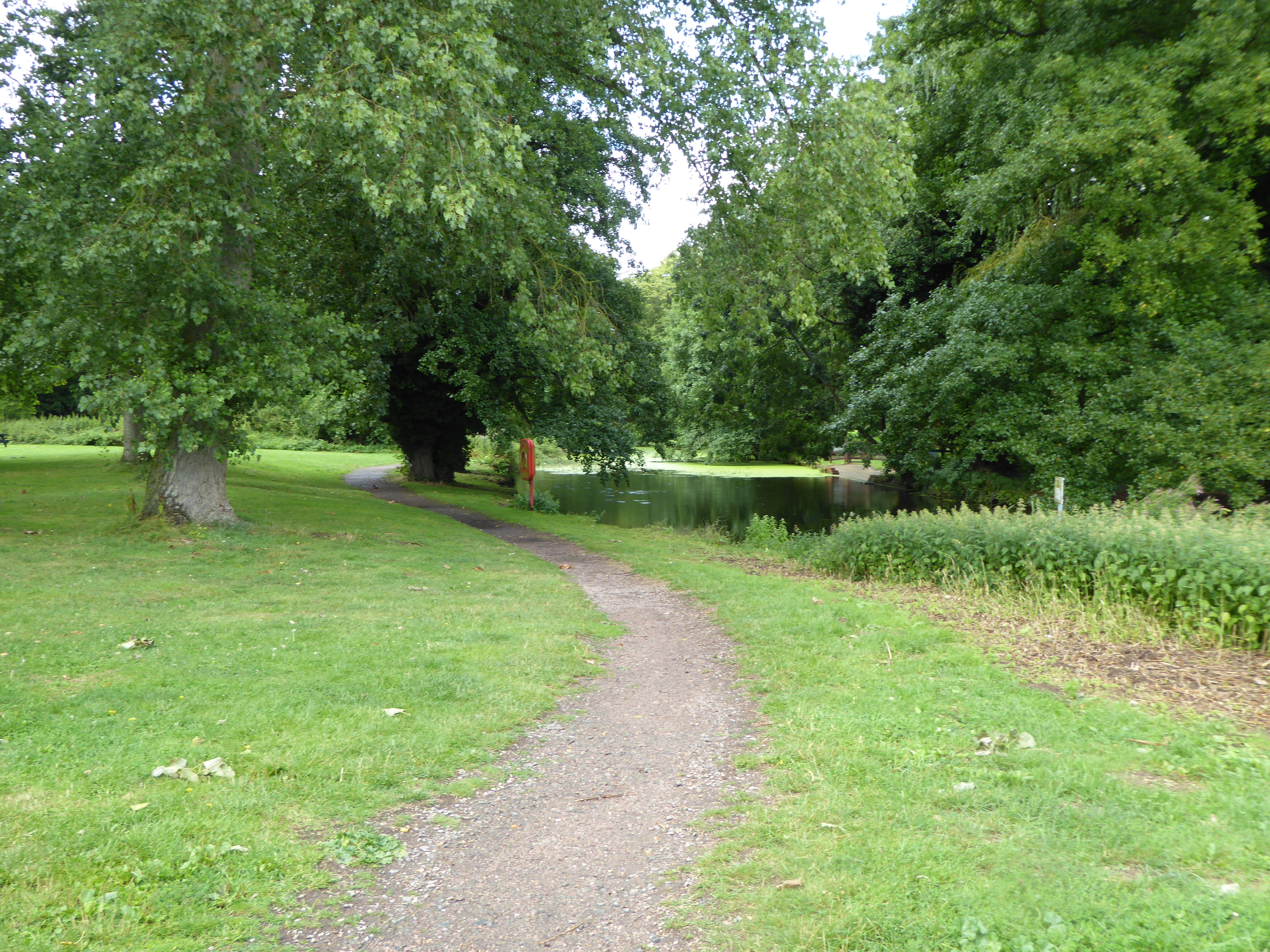
- Riverside Walk with the River Brett in the background
- Interactive map of Riverside Walk, Hadleigh
- Type: Local Nature Reserve
- Location: Hadleigh, Suffolk
- OS grid: TM 023 424
- Area: 4.6 hectares (11 acres)
- Manager: Babergh District Council

Riverside Walk is a 4.6-hectare Local Nature Reserve on the western outskirts of Hadleigh in Suffolk. It is owned and managed by Babergh District Council.

This linear site on the west bank of the River Brett comprises two footpaths and the alder woodland and fen between them. Great willowherb and meadowsweet grow in marshy silted up ditches, and birds include warblers and finches.

There is access from Corks Lane and Duke Street.
