= Tiger Hill, Suffolk =

Nature reserve in Suffolk, England

Coordinates: 51.986°N 0.805°E

Tiger Hill
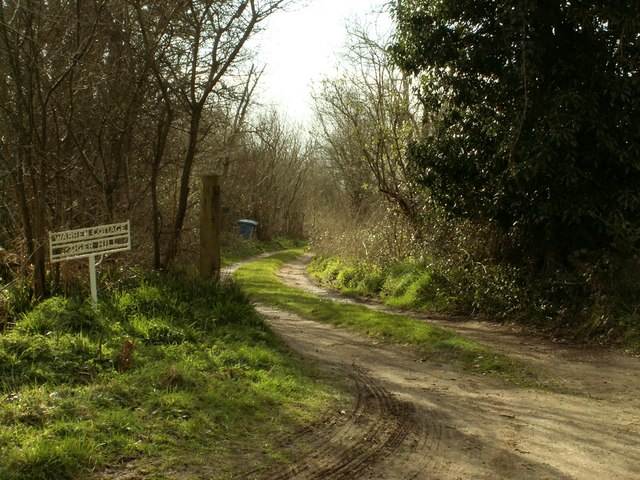
- Interactive map of Tiger Hill
- Type: Local Nature Reserve
- Location: Bures, Suffolk
- OS grid: TL 927 357
- Area: 21.0 hectares (52 acres)
- Manager: Tiger Hill LNR Management Committee

Tiger Hill is a 21 hectare Local Nature Reserve between Bures St Mary and Leavenheath in Suffolk. It is owned by a group of landowners and declared under a LNR Deed agreement by Suffolk County Council and managed by the Tiger Hill LNR Management Committee. The site is in the Dedham Vale Area of Outstanding Natural Beauty, and most of it (excluding a narrow strip of land in the north) is part of the Arger Fen Site of Special Scientific Interest.

This site has woodland, heath and fenland, and fauna include badgers, bats and rare and endangered dormice.

There is access from a road and a footpath, which go through this site.
