= Stoke Park Wood =

Nature reserve in Ipswich, Suffolk, England

Coordinates: 52.034°N 1.133°E

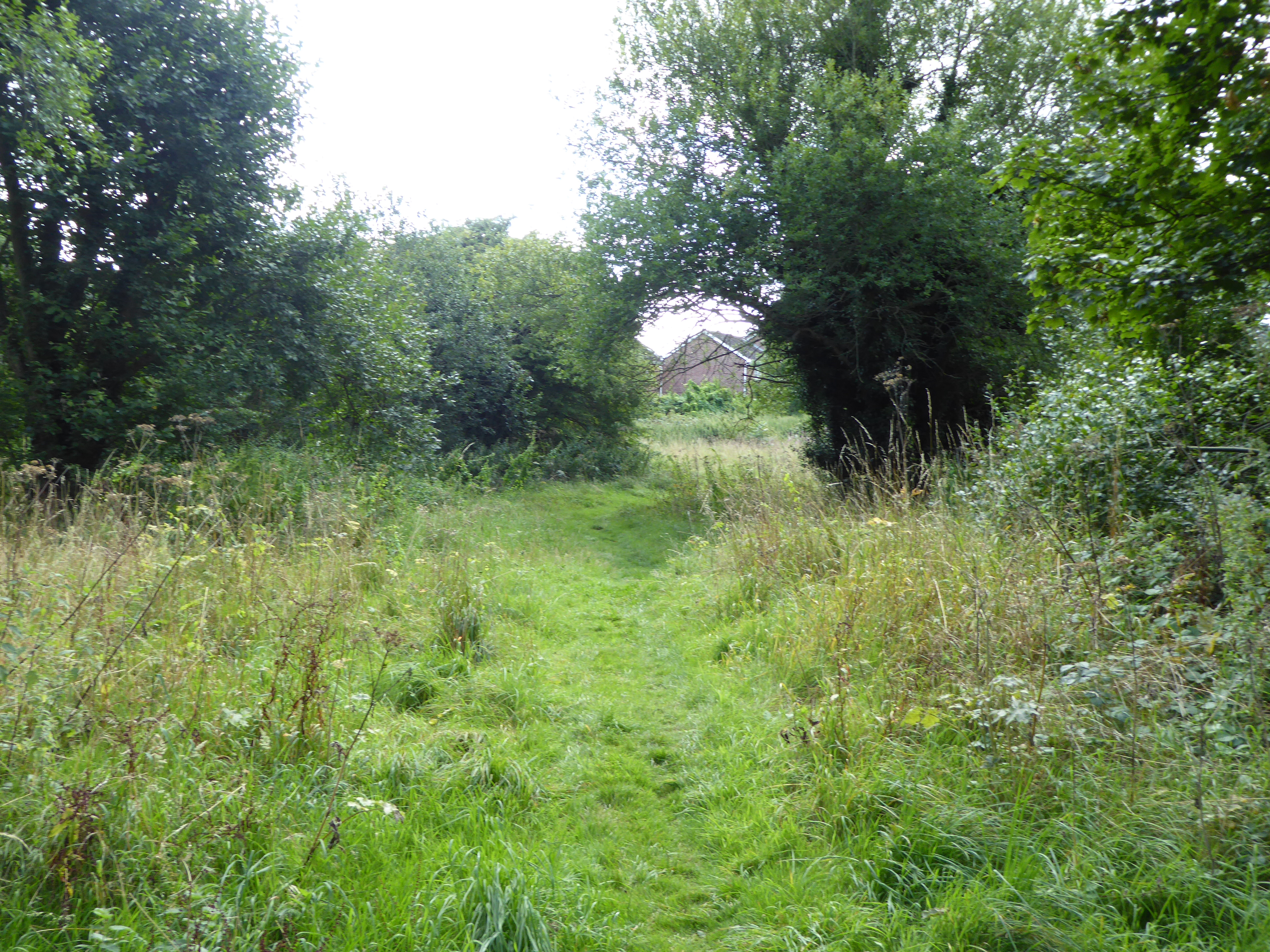
- Interactive map of Stoke Park Wood
- Type: Local Nature Reserve
- Location: Ipswich, Suffolk
- OS grid: TM 150419
- Area: 2.2 hectares (5.4 acres)
- Manager: Greenways Project, Ipswich Borough Council

Stoke Park Wood is a 2.2 hectare Local Nature Reserve in Ipswich in Suffolk. It is owned and managed by Ipswich Borough Council.

This ancient wood was formerly part of the Stoke Park estate, and it still has the remains of a Victorian drainage system. It was formerly called Fishpond Covert as it had a large fishpond. It is a mixed woodland with grass trails and glades.

There is access from Stoke Park Drive.
