= Needham Lake =

Nature reserve in Suffolk, England

Coordinates: 52.153°N 1.06°E

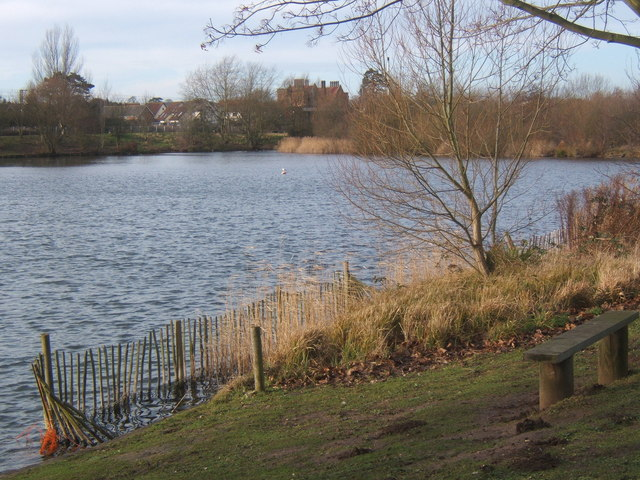
- Interactive map of Needham Lake
- Type: Local Nature Reserve
- Location: Needham Market, Suffolk
- Area: 9.9 hectares (24 acres)
- Manager: Mid Suffolk District Council

Needham Lake is a 9.9 hectare Local Nature Reserve in Needham Market in Suffolk. It is owned and managed by Mid Suffolk District Council. It is a Regionally important geological/geomorphological site (RIGS).

The lake is in former sand and gravel workings. It has diverse fauna and flora in aquatic, marsh and scrub habitats. There are grass and tarmac paths.

There is access from Coddenham Road.
