= Gunton Wood =

Nature reserve Suffolk, United Kingdom

Coordinates: 52.502°N 1.742°E

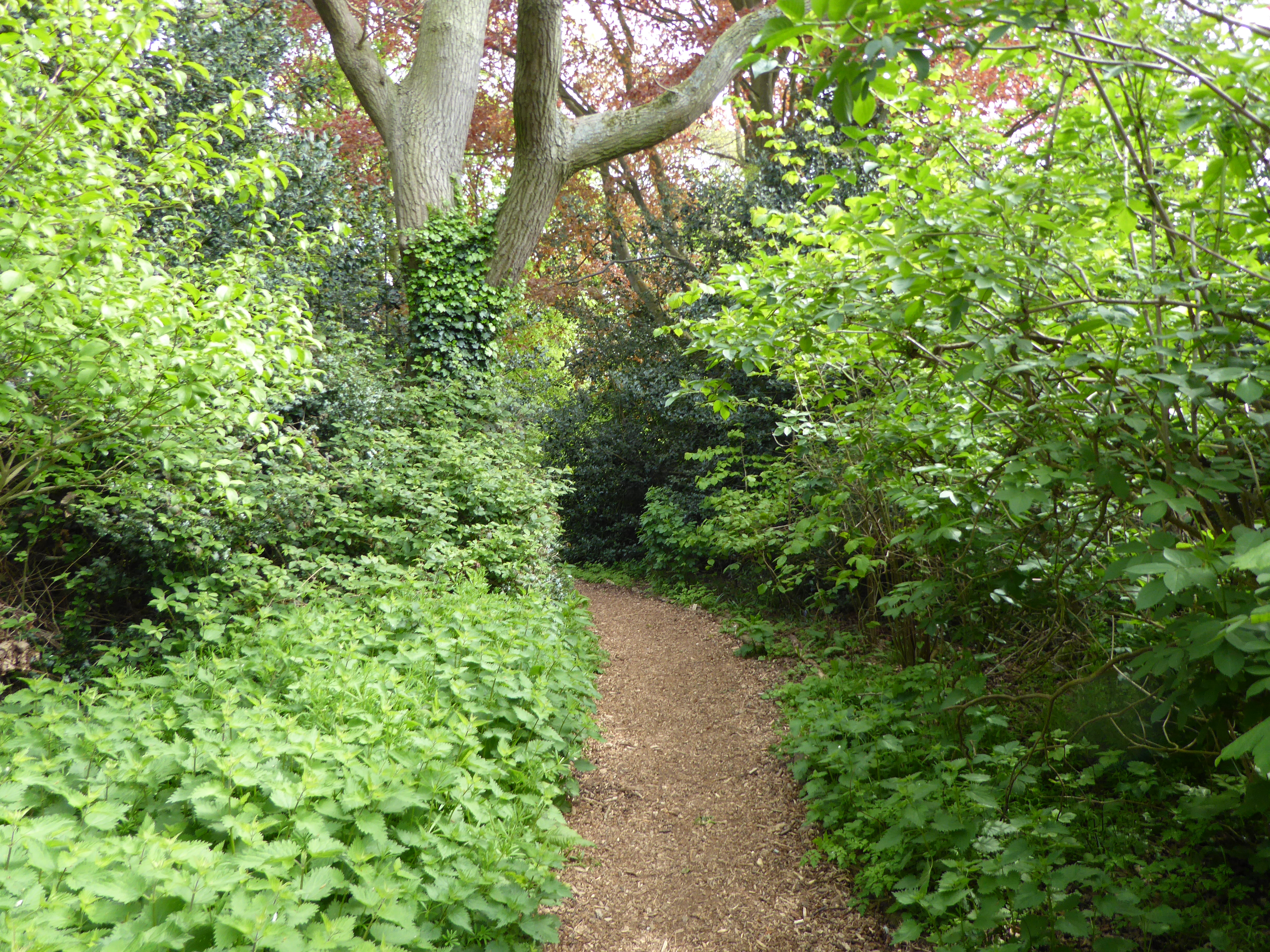
- Interactive map of Gunton Wood
- Type: Local Nature Reserve
- Location: Lowestoft, Suffolk
- OS grid: TM 541 959
- Area: 2.8 hectares (6.9 acres)
- Manager: Gunton Wood Community Project

Gunton Wood is a 2.8 hectare Local Nature Reserve in Lowestoft in Suffolk. It is owned by Waveney District Council and managed by the Gunton Wood Community Project.

This was formerly part of the gardens of Gunton Old Hall, which was demolished in 1963. There are trees such as lime, oak and copper beech, a pond and green winged and bee orchids.

There is access from Gunton Church Lane.
