= The Pennings, Eye =

Nature reserve in Suffolk, England

Coordinates: 52.319°N 1.153°E

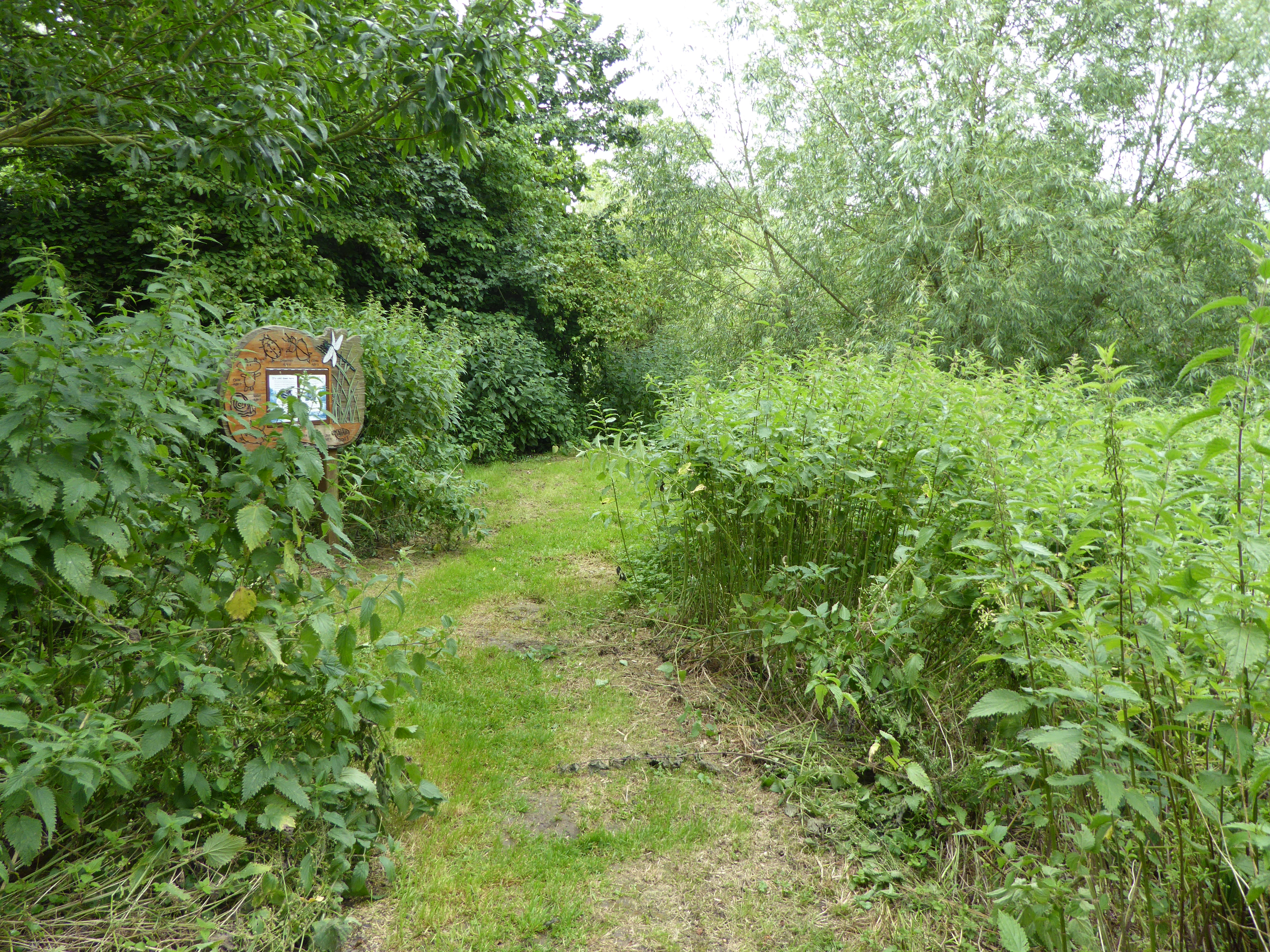
- Interactive map of The Pennings, Eye
- Type: Local Nature Reserve
- Location: Eye, Suffolk
- OS grid: TM 150 736
- Area: 2.7 hectares (6.7 acres)
- Manager: Mid Suffolk District Council

The Pennings is a 2.7 hectare Local Nature Reserve in Eye in Suffolk. It is owned and managed by Mid Suffolk District Council.

This site on the east bank of the River Dove is managed as a hay meadow. Fauna on the river bank include kingfishers and water voles.

There is access from Ludgate Causeway, off Hoxne Road.
