= The Railway Walks =

Local nature reserve in Suffolk, England

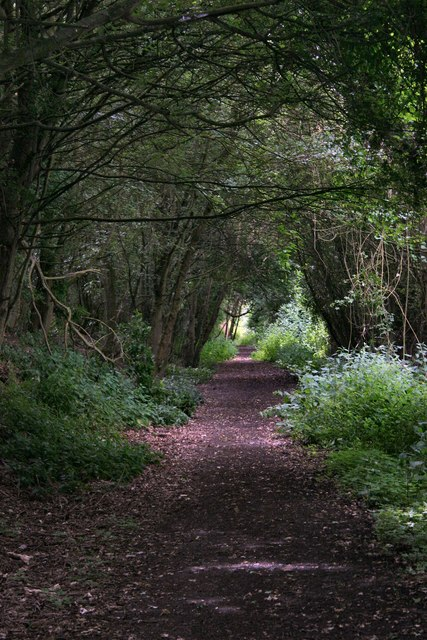
- Interactive map of The Railway Walks
- Type: Local Nature Reserve
- Location: Sudbury to Lavenham, Suffolk
- OS grid: TL 9043 4923
- Coordinates: 52.108611°N 0.779403°E
- Area: 25.3 hectares (63 acres)
- Manager: Suffolk County Council

The Railway Walks is a 25.3 hectare Local Nature Reserve which runs along parts of a former railway line between Sudbury and Lavenham in Suffolk. It is owned and managed by Suffolk County Council.

The walk has diverse fauna and flora in habitats such as water meadows, streams, ditches and ponds. Birds include willow warblers, kingfishers, woodpeckers, mallards, moorhens and swans.
