= Arger Fen =

Nature reserve in Suffolk, England

- Site of Special Scientific Interest
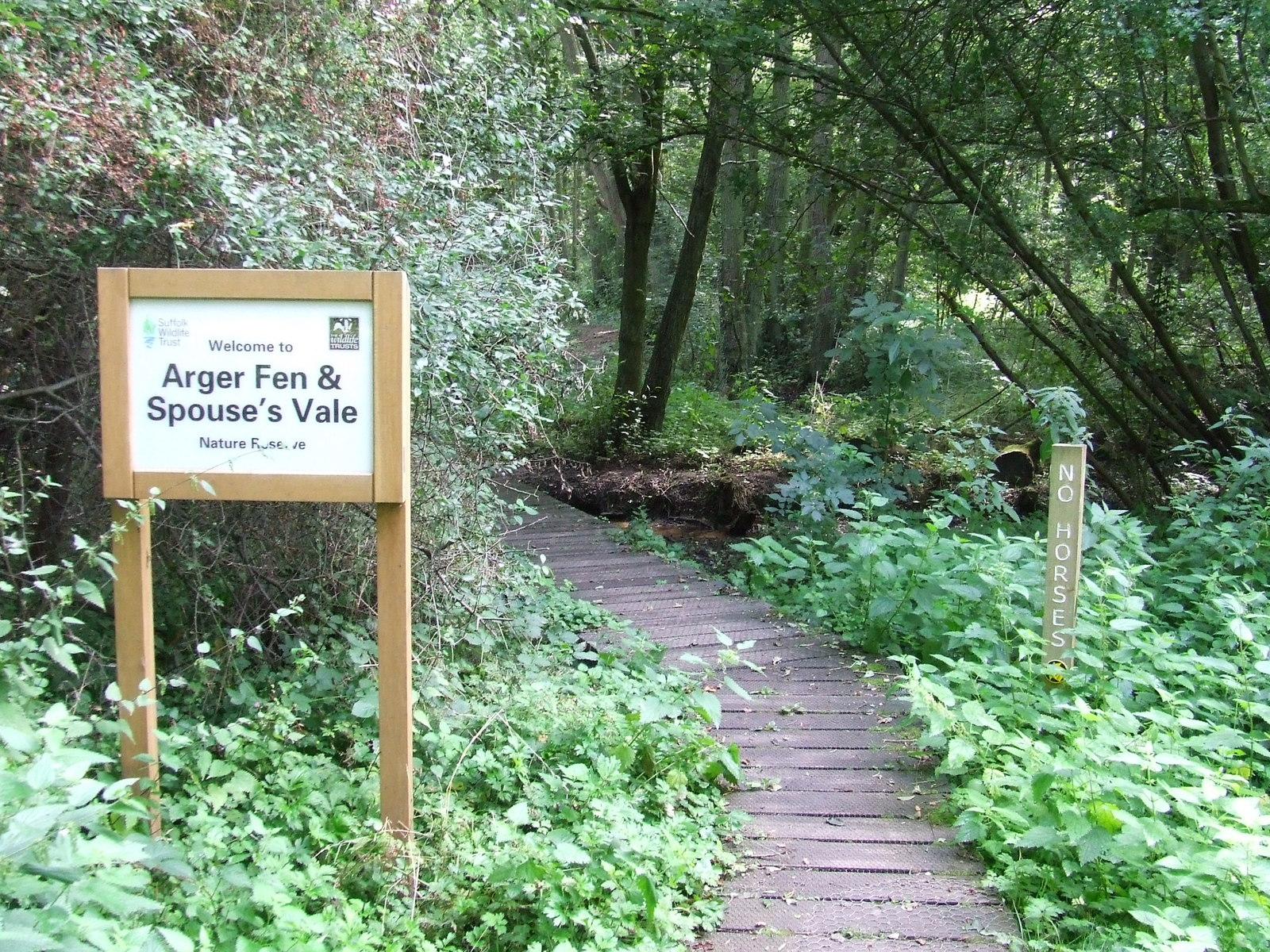

- Arger Fen within Suffolk
- Location of Arger Fen.
- Area of search: Suffolk
- Grid reference: TL933356
- Coordinates: 51.986°N 0.818°E
- Interest: Biological
- Area: 49.7 hectares (0.50 km^{2}; 0.19 sq mi)
- Notification date: 1986
- Location map: Magic Map

Arger Fen is a 49.7-hectare (123-acre) biological Site of Special Scientific Interest (SSSI) south-east of Sudbury in Suffolk, England. The site occupies two separate areas. The 17.6-hectare (43-acre) Arger Fen Local Nature Reserve is part of the larger eastern block, and contains part of the 21-hectare (52-acre) Tiger Hill Local Nature Reserve, along with part of the 110-hectare (270-acre) Arger Fen and Spouse's Vale, a nature reserve managed by the Suffolk Wildlife Trust. The site lies in the Dedham Vale Area of Outstanding Natural Beauty,

The site is made up of a mix of woodland and meadow habitats with much of the woodland believed to be ancient in origin. The underlying geology is a mixture of sand and gravel banks and clay soils, producing a mix of habitat types, including wet fen type habitats at lower levels and dry grasslands on acidic soils on hill tops. It is one of only two known areas of ancient woodland in Eastern England which feature wild cherry (Prunus avium).

Badgers are found on the reserve in a number of active setts. Other rare fauna include the hazel dormouse and barbastelle bat. In 2012 the reserve, which has ash trees at least 300 years old, was identified as a site of ash dieback and in 2013 it became a research site for Forestry Commission scientists studying genetic resistance to the Chalara fungus which causes the disease.

There are onsite car parking facilities as well as two-way marked trails, including areas of board walk. The trust has attempted to encourage the growth of the dormouse population, partly by expanding the area of land it owns at Arger Fen.
