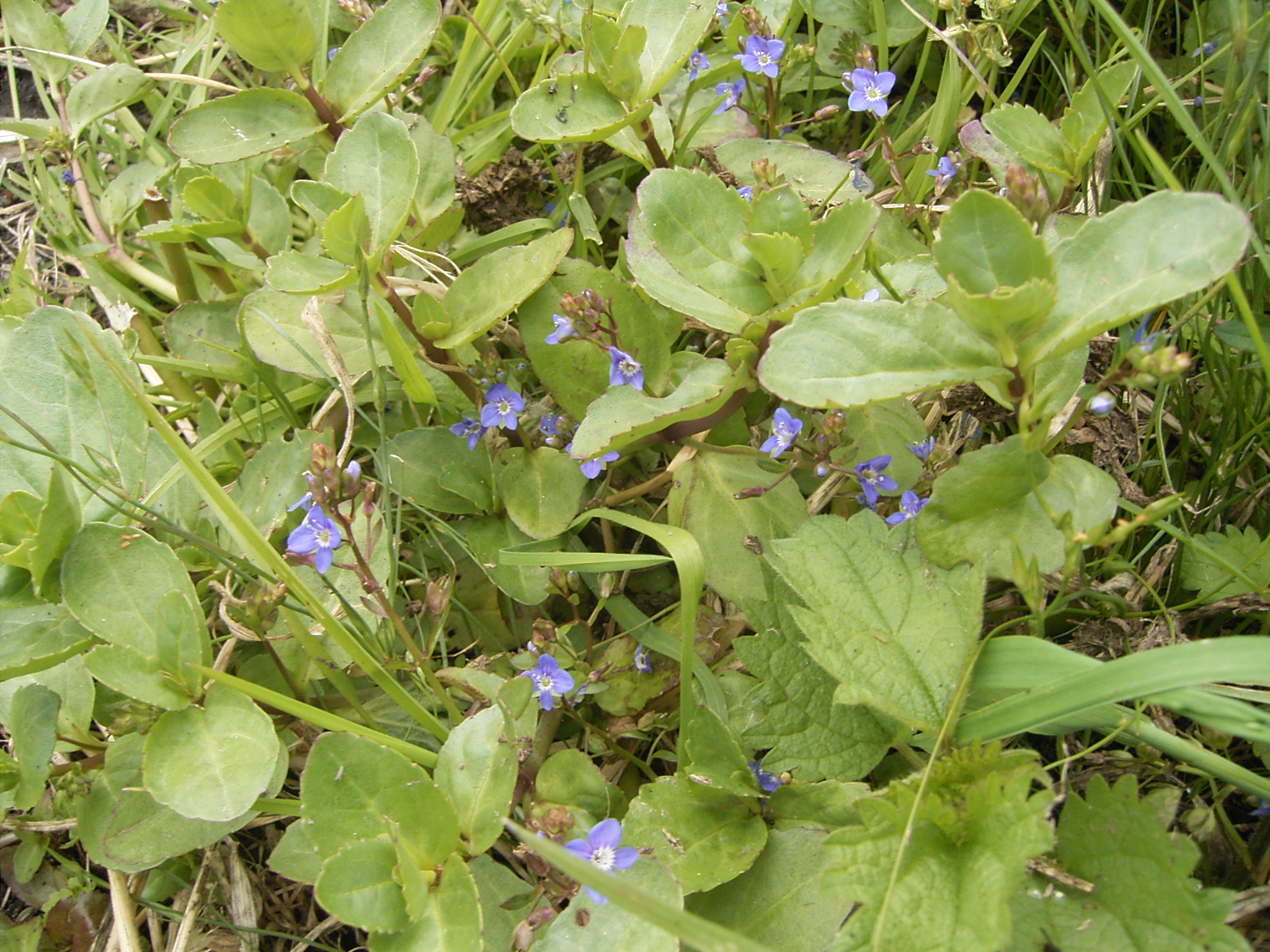

Conservation status
- Least Concern (IUCN 3.1)

Scientific classification
- Kingdom: Plantae
- Clade: Tracheophytes
- Clade: Angiosperms
- Clade: Eudicots
- Clade: Asterids
- Order: Lamiales
- Family: Plantaginaceae
- Genus: Veronica
- Species: V. beccabunga

Binomial name
- Veronica beccabunga L.

= Veronica beccabunga =

Species of flowering plant

Veronica beccabunga, the European speedwell or brooklime, is a succulent herbaceous perennial plant belonging to the flowering plant family Plantaginaceae. It grows on the margins of brooks and ditches in Europe, North Africa, and north and western Asia. It can be found on other continents as an introduced species. It has smooth spreading succulent branches that are often reddish, blunt oblong finely serrate leaves in opposite pairs close to the stem, and small bright blue or pink flowers with four petals.

The specific name beccabunga has a common origin with bäckebunga, an archaic Swedish name for the plant used at the time when it was described by Carl Linnaeus. Names with the same origin are still in use in other European languages, including beekpunge in Dutch, and bachbunge in German (meaning 'brook bunch', or 'brook pouch').

== Medicinal usage ==
Brooklime was one of three traditional antiscorbutic herbs (alongside scurvy grass and watercress), used in purported remedies for scurvy. However, none of these herbs is rich in vitamin C and the usual preparation by extracting of juices would have destroyed most of their content, rendering the preparations ineffectual against true scurvy. However, they are plants that last into the winter, past the first frosts, and may well have been one of the few sources of vitamin C when eaten as a winter salad.
