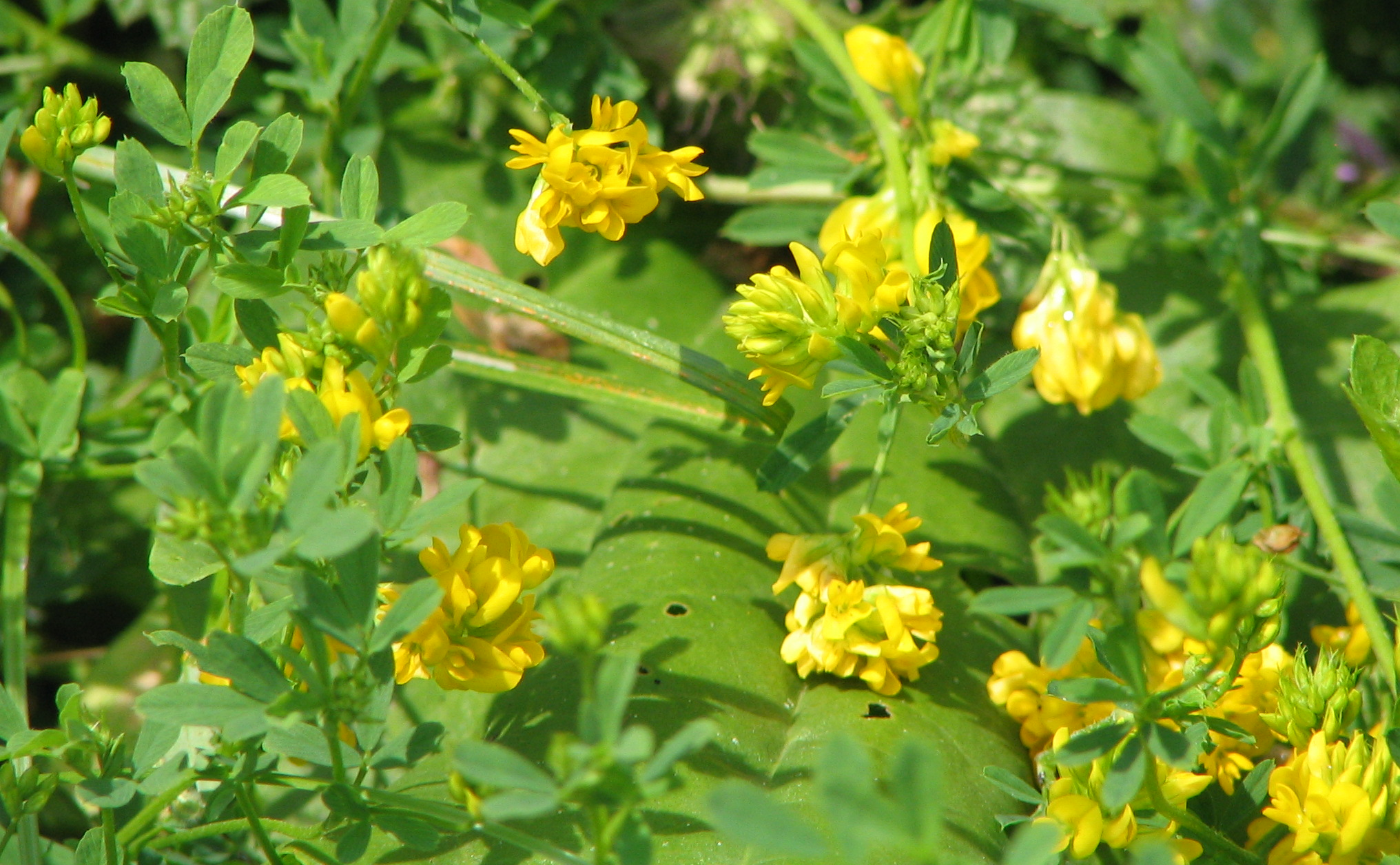

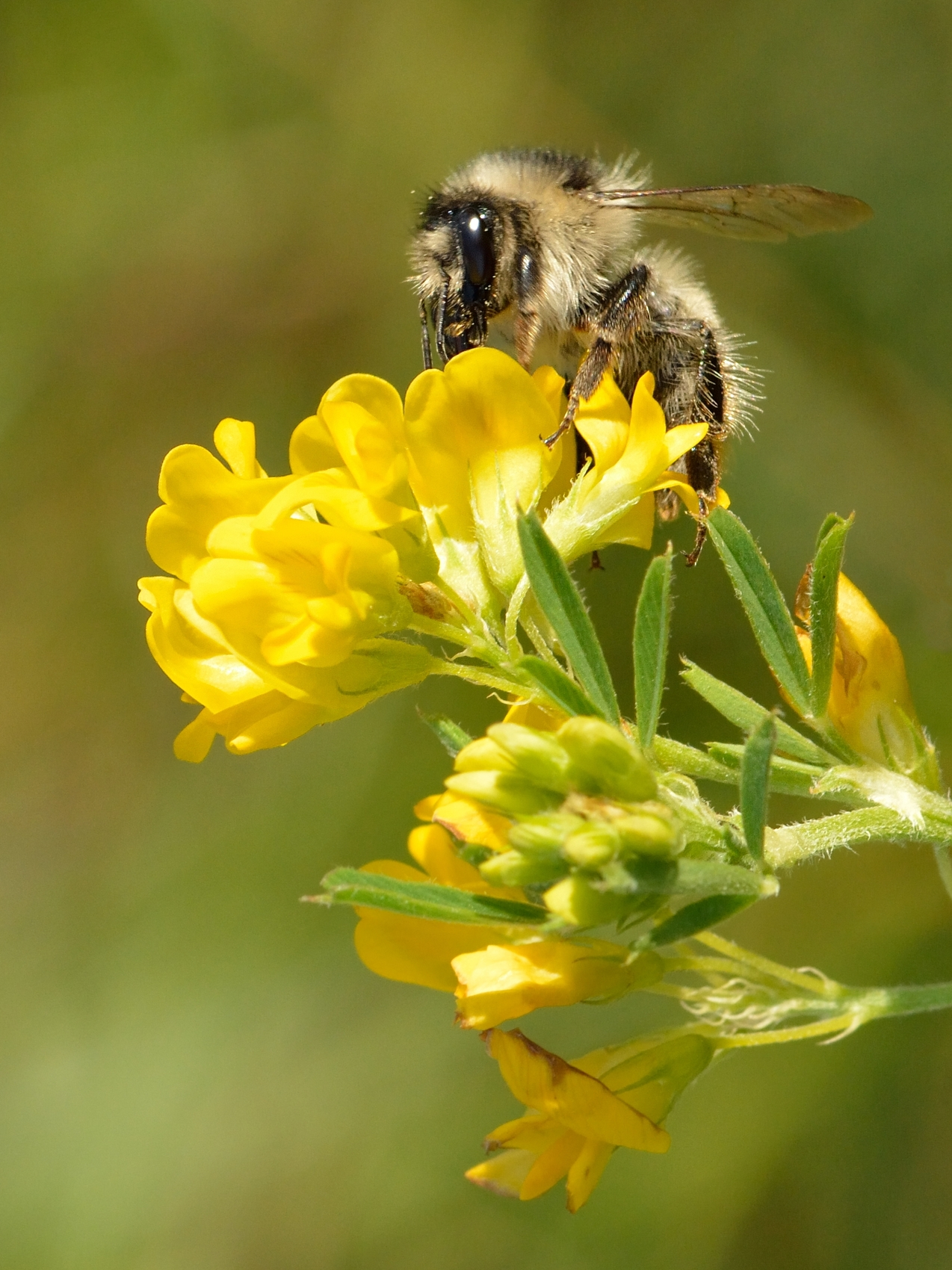

Scientific classification
- Kingdom: Plantae
- Clade: Tracheophytes
- Clade: Angiosperms
- Clade: Eudicots
- Clade: Rosids
- Order: Fabales
- Family: Fabaceae
- Subfamily: Faboideae
- Genus: Medicago
- Species: M. falcata

Binomial name
- Medicago falcata L.

Synonyms
- Medicago aurantiaca Godron; Medicago glandulosa Davidoff; Medicago glutinosa sensu Hayek; Medicago procumbens Besser; Medicago quasifalcata Sinsk. Medicago romanica Prodan; Medicago sativa subsp. falcata (L.) Arcang. Medicago sativa subsp. glandulosa (Koch) Arcang. Medicago talcata L. Medicago tenderiensis Klokov

= Medicago falcata =

Species of legume

Medicago falcata is a plant species of the genus Medicago. It is native to much of Europe and Asia, but is found throughout the world. It forms a symbiotic relationship with the bacterium Sinorhizobium meliloti, which is capable of nitrogen fixation. Its common names include yellow lucerne, sickle alfalfa, yellow-flowered alfalfa, yellow alfalfa, sickle medick and yellow medick.
