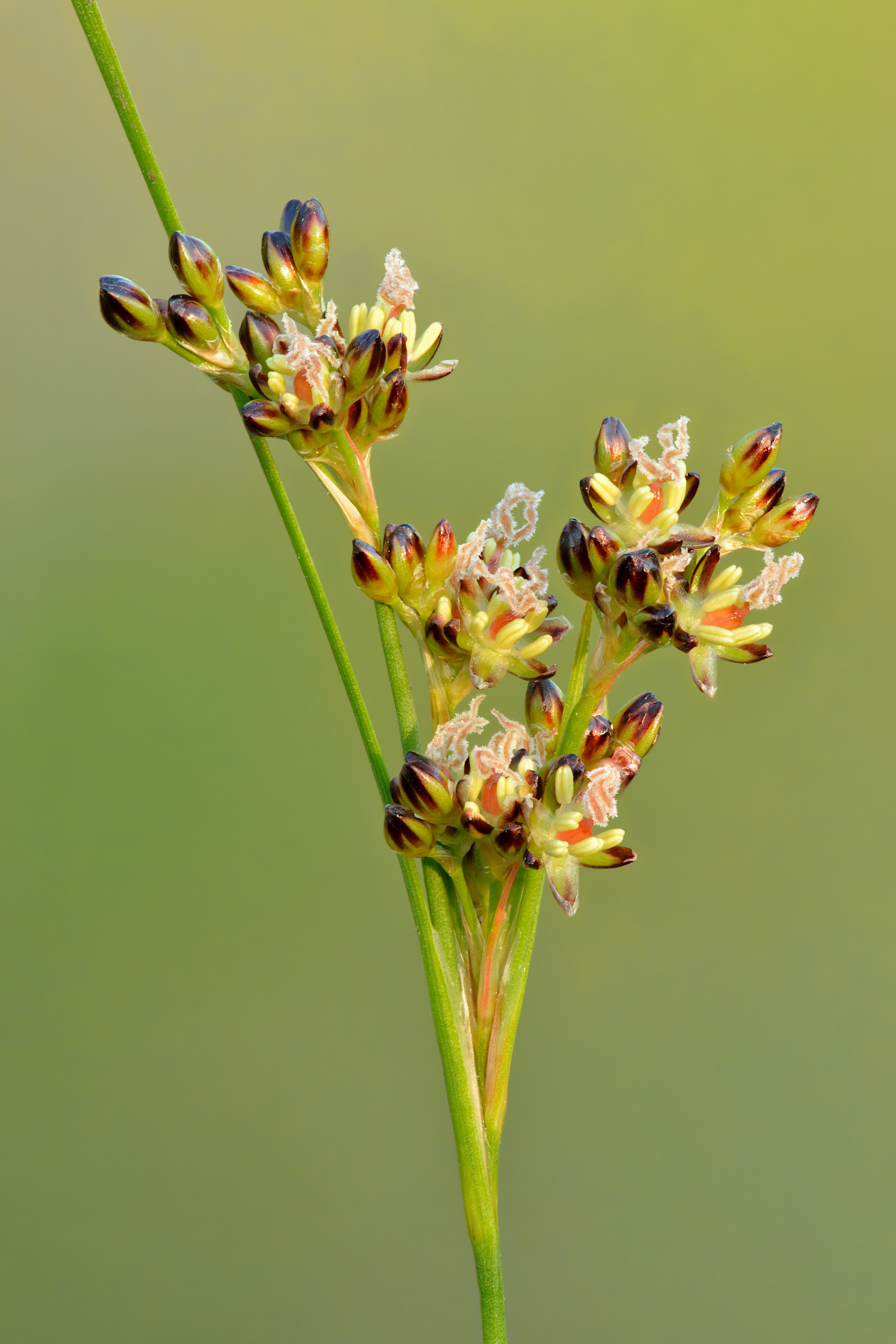

Scientific classification
- Kingdom: Plantae
- Clade: Tracheophytes
- Clade: Angiosperms
- Clade: Monocots
- Clade: Commelinids
- Order: Poales
- Family: Juncaceae
- Genus: Juncus
- Species: J. compressus

Binomial name
- Juncus compressus Jacq., 1762

= Juncus compressus =

Round Fruited Rush

Species of rush

Juncus compressus, the round fruited rush, is a species of flowering plant in the rush family, Juncaceae. It is native to temperate Eurasia.Juncus compressus is easy to confuse with J. gerardii.

== Description ==
About 80 cm in height. Rhizomes are short-creeping or densely branching. There are 1-3 cataphylls, and 1-2 leaves. The leaf blade is flat to slightly channeled, measuring 5–35 cm long and 0.8–2 mm wide. Inflorescences consist of 5-60 flowers. Flowers have six stamens, with filaments measuring 0.5-0.7 mm and anthers 0.6–1 mm. Seed capsules are brown.

== Habitat ==
Juncus compressus prefers calcareous wetlands and is often associated with disturbed habitats, such as ditches, roadsides, railroads, and canal banks.

== Invasive species ==
The plant is considered an invasive species in the United States of America.

US Spread
State/Province	First Observed
IL	1982
IN	1987
MI	1980
NY	1895
WI	1974
