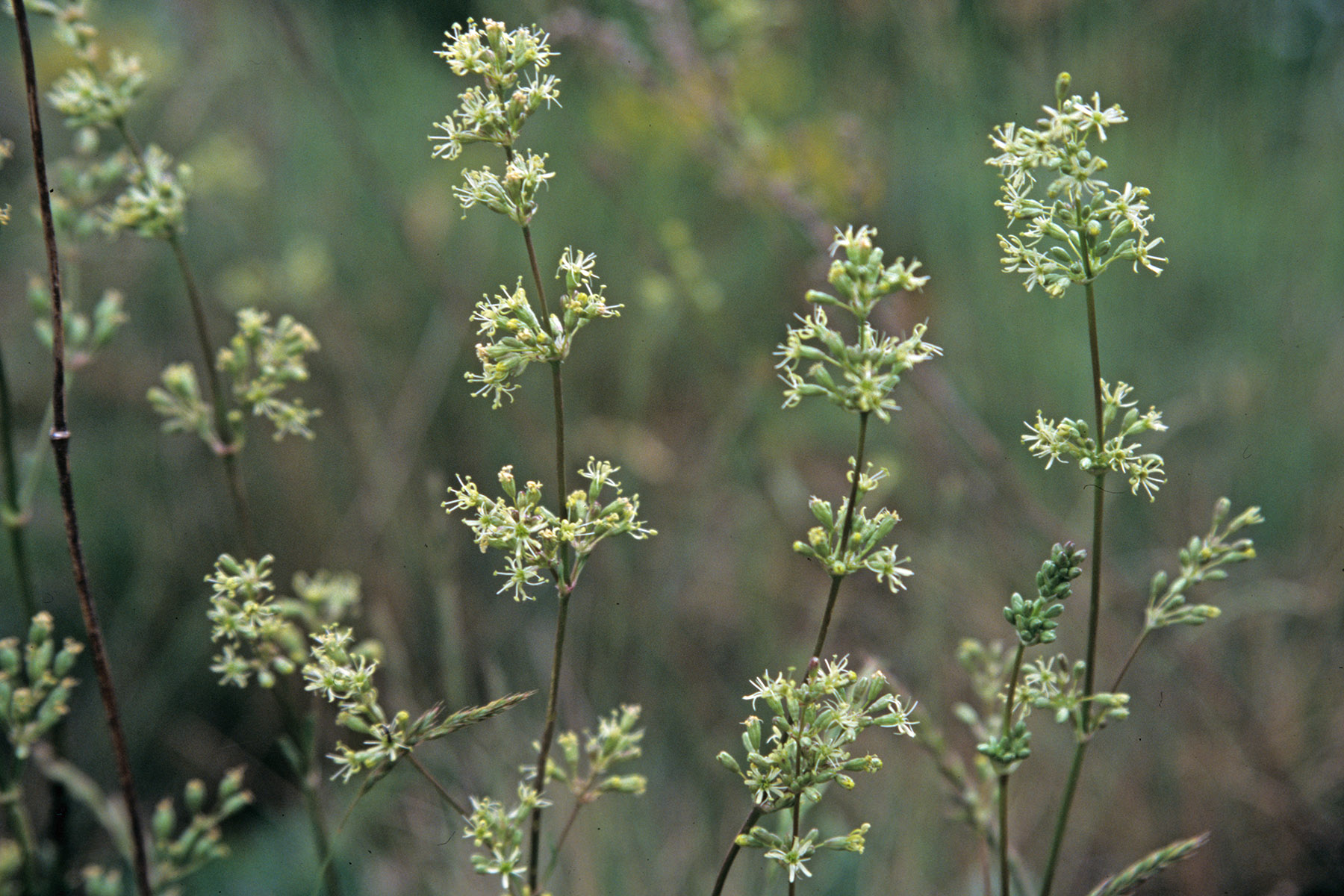
- In bloom
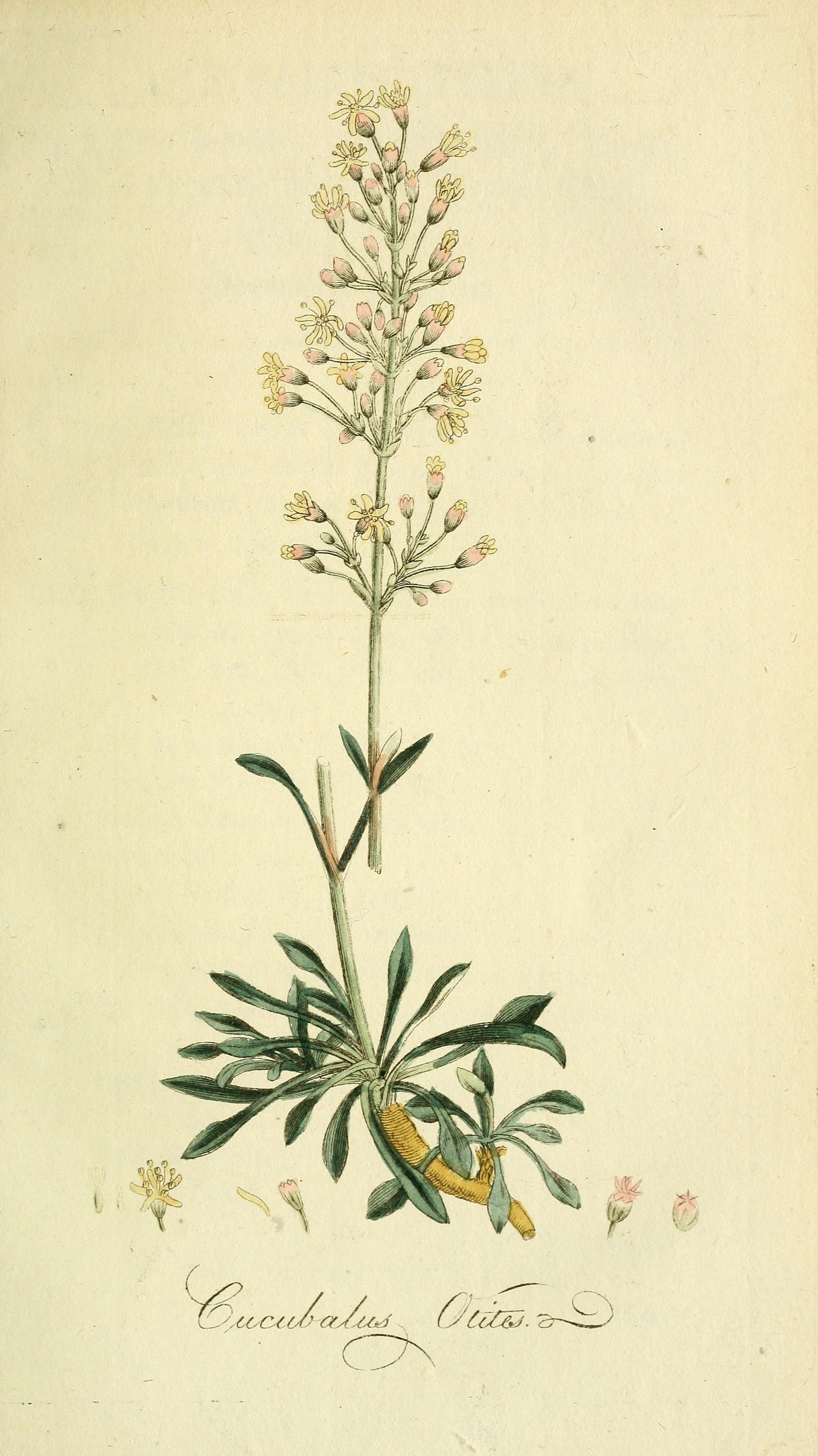
- Botanical illustration

Scientific classification
- Kingdom: Plantae
- Clade: Embryophytes
- Clade: Tracheophytes
- Clade: Angiosperms
- Clade: Eudicots
- Order: Caryophyllales
- Family: Caryophyllaceae
- Genus: Silene
- Species: S. otites

Binomial name
- Silene otites (L.) Wibel

Synonyms
- List: Cucubalus dioicus Gilib.; Cucubalus hermaphroditus Gilib.; Cucubalus otites L.; Cucubalus parviflorus Lam.; Diplogama otites (L.) Opiz; Lychnis otites (L.) Scop.; Otites cuneifolius Raf.; Otites cuneifolius subsp. arenarius (Podp.) Holub; Otites trichocalycinus (Boiss.) Holub; Silene effusa Otth; Silene otitis St.-Lag.; Silene pedicellata Boiss.; Silene trichocalycina (Boiss.) Bornm.; Viscago otites (L.) Hornem.; Viscago polygama Stokes

= Silene otites =

Species of flowering plant

Silene otites, called Spanish catchfly, is a species of flowering plant in the genus Silene, native to Europe and the Transcaucasus area, and introduced to Xinjiang in China. It varies its floral odors to attract mosquitoes and moths at night and flies and bees by day. It is dioecious, with separate male and female plants.

== Subspecies ==
The following subspecies are currently accepted:

- Silene otites subsp. hungarica Wrigley
- Silene otites subsp. otites
