= List of Sites of Special Scientific Interest in Suffolk =

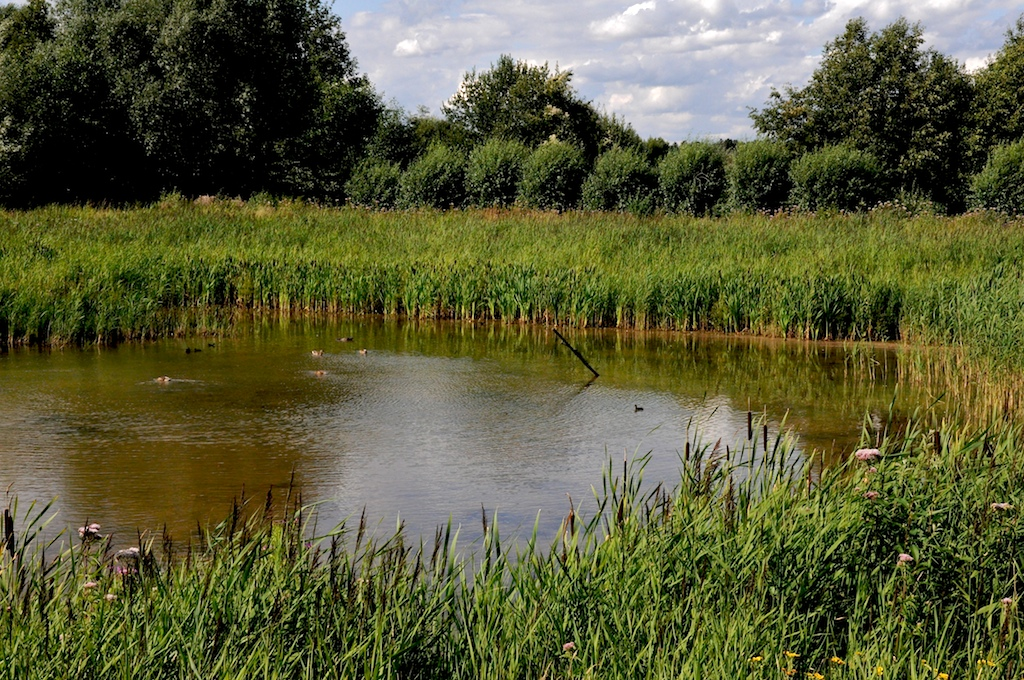
View over a pond from a bird hide at Lackford Lakes

Suffolk is a county in East Anglia. It is bounded by Norfolk to the north, Cambridgeshire to the west, Essex to the south and the North Sea to the east. With an area of 1,466 square miles (3,800 km^{2}), it is the eighth largest county in England, and in mid-2016 the population was 745,000. At the top level of local government is Suffolk County Council, and below it are 5 borough and district councils: Babergh, Ipswich, Mid Suffolk, West Suffolk and East Suffolk. Much of the coast consists of the estuaries of the Orwell, Stour, Alde, Deben and Blyth rivers, with large areas of wetlands and marshes. Agriculture and shipping play a major role in the county's economy.

In England, Sites of Special Scientific Interest (SSSIs) are designated by Natural England, a non-departmental public body which is responsible for protecting England's natural environment. Designation as an SSSI gives legal protection to the most important wildlife and geological sites. As of October 2017 there are 142 SSSIs in Suffolk, of which 109 are biological, 28 geological and 5 are designated under both criteria.

One site is in the Dedham Vale, an Area of Outstanding Natural Beauty (AONB), and thirty-six are in another AONB, Suffolk Coast and Heaths. There are thirty-three Geological Conservation Review sites, twenty-three Nature Conservation Review sites, twenty Special Areas of Conservation, thirty Special Protection Areas under the European Union Directive on the Conservation of Wild Birds, eight Ramsar internationally important wetland sites, seven national nature reserves and four contain scheduled monuments. Six sites are local nature reserves, twenty-seven are managed by the Suffolk Wildlife Trust, five by the Royal Society for the Protection of Birds and one by the National Trust. The largest is Breckland Forest at 18,126-hectare (44,790-acre), which is partly in Norfolk and has several invertebrates on the IUCN Red List of Threatened Species, and the smallest is a 0.1-hectare (0.25-acre) meadow in London Road Industrial Estate, Brandon, which has the largest known wild population in Britain of the nationally rare sunflower Artemisia campestris.

== Key ==
=== Interest ===
- B = a site of biological interest
- G = a site of geological interest

=== Public access ===
- FP = access to footpaths through the site only
- NO = no public access to site
- PL = public access at limited times
- PP = public access to part of site
- YES = public access to the whole or most of the site

=== Other classifications ===
- DVAONB = Dedham Vale, an Area of Outstanding Natural Beauty
- GCR = Geological Conservation Review
- LNR = Local nature reserve
- NCR = A Nature Conservation Review
- NNR = National nature reserve
- NT = National Trust
- Ramsar = Ramsar site, an internationally important wetland site
- RSPB = Royal Society for the Protection of Birds
- SAC = Special Area of Conservation
- SCHAONB = Suffolk Coast and Heaths, an Area of Outstanding Natural Beauty
- SM = Scheduled monument
- SPA = Special Protection Area under the European Union Directive on the Conservation of Wild Birds
- SWT = Suffolk Wildlife Trust

== Sites ==
Site name	Photograph	B	G	Area	Public access	Location	Other classifications	Map (Note: The maps are provided by Natural England on the Magic Map website.)	Citation (Note: Citations are provided for each site by Natural England.)	Description
Abbey Wood, Flixton	Abbey Wood, Flixton	✓		18.0 hectares (44 acres)	NO	Flixton; 52.422°N 1.403°E; TM 315 859		Map	Citation	This ancient woodland is managed as coppice with standards. Common trees include hazel, hornbeam and oak. The flora are diverse with dog's mercury dominant, and there is one rare species, thin-spiked wood sedge.
Alde–Ore Estuary	Alde-Ore Estuary	✓	✓	2,534.0 hectares (6,262 acres)	PP	Woodbridge; 52.1°N 1.5°E; TM 425 512	GCR, NCR NNR NT, Ramsar, RSPB, SAC, SCHAONB, SPA, SWT	Map	Citation	Natural England describes the scientific interests of the site as "outstanding and diverse". It has the second largest and best preserved area of vegetated shingle in Britain. The birdlife is nationally important, and there are several rare spiders. Gedgrave Cliff has fossiliferous strata dating to the early Pliocene Coralline Crag Formation.
Aldeburgh Brick Pit	Aldeburgh Brick Pit		✓	0.9 hectares (2.2 acres)	NO	Aldeburgh; 52.159°N 1.583°E; TM 452 572	GCR, SCHAONB	Map	Citation	This pit has a sequence of deposits dating to the Pleistocene, and it is one of the few to have deposits dating to the Bramertonian Stage, around two million years ago. It has been fundamental to two studies of the early Pleistocene in the area.
Aldeburgh Hall Pit	Aldeburgh Hall Pit		✓	1.0 hectare (2.5 acres)	NO	Aldeburgh; 52.153°N 1.583°E; TM 452 566	GCR, SCHAONB	Map	Citation	This site has very fossiliferous rocks of the early Pliocene Coralline Crag Formation around five million years ago. The bryozoan fauna are rich and diverse, and the stratification may indicate the interior of an offshore sandbank.
Arger Fen	Arger Fen	✓		49.7 hectares (123 acres)	YES	Sudbury; 51.986°N 0.812°E; TL 932 357	DVAONB, LNR, SWT	Map	Citation	Most of this site is ancient woodland, and there are also areas of fen and wet grassland on lower slopes. Tiger Hill has dry, acidic grassland, with old anthills, mosses and lichens, and there are several badger setts.
Bangrove Wood, Ixworth	Bangrove Wood	✓		18.6 hectares (46 acres)	NO	Bury St Edmunds; 52.313°N 0.83°E; TL 930 721		Map	Citation	This is ancient coppice with standards on clay soil with diverse herb flora. The most common trees are ash, field maple and hazel, with many oak standards. Flora include early purple orchid, wood anemone and pale wood violet.
Barking Woods	Barking Woods	✓		98.7 hectares (244 acres)	PP	Ipswich; 52.13°N 1.03°E; TM 077 521	SWT	Map	Citation	These ancient woodlands have been documented since 1251. The canopy is mainly oak, ash and silver birch, and other trees include the rare wild pear. The flora is diverse, including herb paris, ramsons, sanicle and early purple orchid.
Barnby Broad and Marshes	Barnby Broad and Marshes	✓		192.7 hectares (476 acres)	PP	Beccles; 52.46°N 1.64°E; TM 477 910	Ramsar, SAC, SPA, SWT	Map	Citation	This site has grazing marshes, fen, carr woodland, open water and dykes. The diverse plant communities include many rare and uncommon species. Several rare birds breed there, and the site is also interesting entomologically. Otters hunt in the fen and waterways.
Barnham Heath	Barnham Heath	✓		78.6 hectares (194 acres)	NO	Barnham; 52.384°N 0.764°E; TL 882 798	NCR, SPA	Map	Citation	This site has areas of acidic heathland with damp grassland in river valleys. Gravel workings and scrub have produced habitats valuable to birds such as nightingales and common whitethroats. Birds found on open heathland include Eurasian stone-curlews, a protected species, and northern wheatears. Six species of lichen and eight of moss have been recorded.
Bawdsey Cliff	Bawdsey Cliff		✓	17.4 hectares (43 acres)	YES	Felixstowe; 52.0°N 1.416°E; TM 346 386	GCR, SCHAONB	Map	Citation	This 2-kilometre (1.2-mile) long section provides the largest exposure of the Early Pleistocene Red Crag Formation, and it is rich in fossils of marine molluscs. It is described by Natural England as having great potential for the study of non-glacial Pleistocene environments.
Berner's Heath	Berner's Heath	✓		235.9 hectares (583 acres)	PL	Bury St Edmunds; 52.36°N 0.64°E; TL 797 763	NCR, SAC, SPA	Map	Citation	Most of the heath is dominated by heather, and there are also areas of woodland, scrub, calcareous grassland and lichen-rich grassland. The heather varies in age as it has been rotationally burnt, and the oldest heather has the most diverse flora and insects.
Bixley Heath	Bixley Heath	✓		5.1 hectares (13 acres)	YES	Ipswich; 52.041°N 1.205°E; TM 199 429	LNR	Map	Citation	This site has areas of dry heath on high ground and swamp in a valley bottom. The heath is dominated by common heather, and other plants include bell heather and sheep's fescue. There is a dense stand of lesser pond-sedge in the swamp.
Black Ditches, Cavenham	Black Ditches, Cavenham	✓		1.6 hectares (4.0 acres)	NO	Bury St Edmunds; 52.285°N 0.599°E; TL 774 684	SM	Map	Citation	This is species-rich grassland, a scarce habitat in East Anglia, on a stretch of an early Anglo-Saxon boundary earthwork. There are a number of locally and nationally rare plants. Calcareous scrub and deciduous woodland provide additional ecological interest.
Blaxhall Heath	Blaxhall Heath	✓		45.9 hectares (113 acres)	YES	Woodbridge; 52.155°N 1.478°E; TM 380 565	SCHAONB, SM, SPA, SWT	Map	Citation	This dry lowland heath has large areas of heather which support diverse lichens and mosses, and other areas of grassland which are grazed by rabbits. Heathland birds include nightjars and tree pipits.
Blo' Norton and Thelnetham Fens	Thelnetham Fen	✓		21.2 hectares (52 acres)	YES	Thelnetham; 52.37°N 0.961°E; TM 017 788	NCR, SAC, SWT	Map (Note: This site is partly in Norfolk)	Citation	The site is designated mainly because of its open carr fen communities, although further interest is provided by areas of carr woodland and meadows. Calcareous fen flora include black bog rush, saw sedge, purple moor grass and fen orchid.
Bobbitshole, Belstead	Bobbitshole		✓	1.7 hectares (4.2 acres)	NO	Ipswich; 52.029°N 1.131°E; TM 149 414	GCR	Map	Citation	This is the type locality for the warm Ipswichian interglacial around 130,000 to 115,000 year ago. It has yielded continuous deposits from the end of the preceding Wolstonian cold stage to the end of the Ipswichian. It is described by Natural England as a "nationally important Pleistocene reference site".
Bradfield Woods	Bradfield Woods	✓		81.4 hectares (201 acres)	YES	Bury St Edmunds; 52.18°N 0.82°E; TL 930 576	NNR, SWT	Map	Citation	These woods have a history of coppicing dating to before 1252, producing a very high diversity of flora, with over 370 plant species recorded. Uncommon woodland flowers include oxlip, herb paris and ramson. There is also a rich variety of fungi, with two species not recorded elsewhere in Britain.
Breckland Farmland	Breckland Farmland	✓		13,392.4 hectares (33,093 acres)	NO	Brandon; 52.4°N 0.6°E; TL 796 852	SPA	Map	Citation	The site is designated an SSSI for its internationally important population of Eurasian stone-curlews. These birds nest in March on bare ground in cultivated land with very short vegetation. Fields with sugar beet and vegetables and no recreational disturbance are preferred.
Breckland Forest	Breckland Forest	✓	✓	18,126.0 hectares (44,790 acres)	PP	Brandon; 52.4°N 0.7°E; TL 822 872	GCR, LNR, SPA	Map	Citation	The forest has breeding Woodlarks and Eurasian nightjars in internationally important numbers, and several nationally rare vascular plants and invertebrates on the IUCN Red List of Threatened Species. There are also geological sites which provide evidence of the environmental and human history of East Anglia during the Middle Pleistocene.
Brent Eleigh Woods	Brent Eleigh Woods	✓		31.7 hectares (78 acres)	NO	Sudbury; 52.09°N 0.83°E; TL 938 473		Map	Citation	This site consists of three separate areas, Spragg’s, Langley and Camps Woods. They are ancient woodland on calcareous clay soils. The main trees are oak and ash, and there are ponds and a stream.
Buckanay Farm Pit, Alderton	Buckanay Farm Pit		✓	0.7 hectares (1.7 acres)	YES	Woodbridge; 52.03°N 1.433°E; TM 356 424	GCR, SCHAONB	Map	Citation	This fossiliferous site exposes rocks of the marine Red Crag Formation, with a megaripple sequence showing the gradual reduction in depth of the sea. The Red Crag spans the end of the Pliocene around 2.6 million years ago and the start of the succeeding Pleistocene.
Bugg's Hole Fen, Thelnetham	Bugg's Hole Fen	✓		3.7 hectares (9.1 acres)	NO	Thelnetham; 52.373°N 0.944°E; TM 005 791		Map	Citation	This calcareous fen in the valley of the River Little Ouse has a range of habitats. Fen grassland has flora such as grass of parnassus and bog pimpernel, there are southern marsh orchid and marsh pennywort in marsh grassland, and spring-fed tall fen has lesser water parsnip.
Burgate Wood	Burgate Wood	✓		29.9 hectares (74 acres)	NO	Burgate; 52.34°N 1.045°E; TM 075 757	SM	Map	Citation	This is ancient coppice with standards oak and hornbeam woodland. The flora is diverse, including the rare lungwort and the uncommon herb paris, yellow archangel and hairy woodrush.
Cavendish Woods	Cavendish Woods	✓		53.5 hectares (132 acres)	PP	Sudbury; 52.11°N 0.61°E; TL 791 495		Map	Citation	These ancient woods are managed as coppice with standards. The main standard tree is oak, and the flora is diverse, including the uncommon oxlip. There are many fallow deer, and breeding birds include woodcock, common snipe and treecreeper.
Cavenham–Icklingham Heaths	Cavenham – Icklingham Heaths	✓		419.0 hectares (1,035 acres)	YES	Bury St Edmunds; 52.33°N 0.57°E; TL 751 732	NCR, NNR, SAC, SPA	Map	Citation	This site has habitats of heath and grassland, with smaller areas of woodland and fen, in the flood-plain of the River Lark. It is described by Natural England as of national importance for its invertebrate species, including some which are rare and endangered, and it also has nationally rare flora and nationally scarce bryophytes.
Cherry Hill and The Gallops, Barton Mills	Cherry Hill and The Gallops	✓		10.4 hectares (26 acres)	YES	Bury St Edmunds; 52.318°N 0.526°E; TL 723 719	NCR	Map	Citation	This site consists of road verges which have calcareous grassland with four nationally rare plants, and two locally uncommon ones, sand catchfly and yellow medick. There is also a strip of pine plantation which has several rare insects.
Chillesford Church Pit	Chillesford Church Pit		✓	1.1 hectares (2.7 acres)	NO	Woodbridge; 52.117°N 1.478°E; TM 382 522	GCR, SCHAONB	Map	Citation	This site has deposits dating to the Early Pleistocene Bramertonian Stage, around 2.4 to 1.8 million years ago. Fossils of molluscs and pollen indicate a temperate climate dating to the Chillesford Crag, which is part of the Norwich Crag Formation.
Chippenhall Green	Chippenhall Green	✓		16.3 hectares (40 acres)	YES	Eye; 52.333°N 1.355°E; TM 287 758		Map	Citation	This unimproved grassland on calcareous clay soil has grasses including meadow foxtail, sweet vernal grass and red fescue. Diverse flowering plants include cuckoo flowers and a large population of green-winged orchids.
Combs Wood	Combs Wood	✓		15.1 hectares (37 acres)	YES	Stowmarket; 52.171°N 1.004°E; TM 055 568	SWT	Map	Citation	This is ancient coppice woodland on boulder clay, with variable quantities of sand and loess resulting in different soil types. In areas of pedunculate oak and hornbeam the ground flora is sparse, but it is rich and diverse in ash and maple woodland. Grassy rides and a pond provide additional habitats for invertebrates.
Cornard Mere	Cornard Mere	✓		8.5 hectares (21 acres)	YES	Sudbury; 52.016°N 0.75°E; TL 888 389	SWT	Map	Citation	This site has diverse habitats, with fen which is seasonally flooded, ruderal herb vegetation, woodland, grassland and scrub. Flora include water mint, gypsywort, skullcap, ragged robin and southern marsh orchid.
Corton Cliffs	Corton Cliffs		✓	5.5 hectares (14 acres)	YES	Lowestoft; 52.509°N 1.75°E; TM 546 967	GCR	Map	Citation	This is described by Natural England as a "nationally important" site, as it is the type locality for the Anglian glaciation around 450,000 years ago. The Anglian was the most extreme ice age of the Pleistocene epoch. The site displays the complete Anglian sequence and its relation to the preceding Cromerian stage.
Crag Farm Pit, Sudbourne	Crag Farm Pit		✓	4.8 hectares (12 acres)	NO	Woodbridge; 52.116°N 1.545°E; TM 428 523	GCR, SCHAONB	Map	Citation	This site dates to the early Pliocene, around four million years ago. It is described by Natural England as an important geological site, which has the best exposure of sandwave facies of the Coralline Crag Formation. Fossils of many bryozoan species are present.
Crag Pit, Aldeburgh	Crag Pit, Aldeburgh		✓	0.2 hectares (0.49 acres)	NO	Aldeburgh; 52.165°N 1.593°E; TM 458 580	GCR, SCHAONB	Map	Citation	This is the most northern site which exposes the Pliocene Coralline Crag Formation, which dates to around five million years ago. It has rich and diverse fossils, including many bryozoans, and other fauna include serpulids and several boring forms.
Crag Pit, Sutton	Crag Pit, Sutton	✓		0.7 hectares (1.7 acres)	NO	Woodbridge; 52.06°N 1.379°E; TM 317 456	SCHAONB	Map	Citation	This small disused quarry is short rabbit-grazed grassland which supports one of only two British colonies of the endangered Small Alison flowering plants. Herbs include the uncommon mossy stonecrop.
Cransford Meadow	Cransford Meadow	✓		4.6 hectares (11 acres)	NO	Woodbridge; 52.225°N 1.398°E; TM 322 640		Map	Citation	This unimproved meadow has a rich variety of flora. There are grasses such as creeping bent, meadow foxtail, sweet vernal-grass, crested dog's tail, perennial rye-grass and rough-stalked meadow-grass. It is one of only two sites in the county for ladies mantle Alchemilla filicaulis vestita.
Creeting St Mary Pits	Creeting St Mary Pits		✓	5.4 hectares (13 acres)	PP	Ipswich; 52.157°N 1.063°E; TM 096 554	GCR	Map	Citation	These former quarries are the type site for the 'Creeting Sands', which are believed to be intertidal and shallow marine deposits from an early Pleistocene interglacial. It is described by Natural England as a key stratigraphic site.
Deadman's Grave, Icklingham	Deadman's Grave, Icklingham	✓		127.3 hectares (315 acres)	PP	Bury St Edmunds; 52.34°N 0.61°E; TL 779 742	NCR, SAC, SPA	Map	Citation	According to Natural England, this site "is largely covered by short, sheep-grazed, species-rich calcareous grassland of the very highest value." It has four nationally rare plants, Spanish catchfly, Boehmer's cat's-tail, Breckland Wild Thyme and spring speedwell. Nationally rare Eurasian stone-curlews breed there.
Deben Estuary SSSI	Deben Estuary	✓		981.1 hectares (2,424 acres)	PP	Woodbridge; 52.04°N 1.35°E; TM 296 434	Ramsar, SCHAONB, SPA	Map	Citation	The site has been designated an SSSI for its overwintering waders and wildfowl, and for its diverse saltmarshes. It has internationally important numbers of overwintering redshanks and nationally important of dark-bellied brent geese, shelducks and black-tailed godwits. The estuary also has three nationally rare plants and a nationally rare mollusc.
Dew's Ponds	Dew's Ponds	✓		6.7 hectares (17 acres)	NO	Halesworth; 52.293°N 1.502°E; TM 389 719	SAC	Map	Citation	This site has a variety of types of grassland, hedges and ditches, on chalk overlain by boulder clay. However, it has been designated an SSSI primarily because it has twelve ponds with one of the largest breeding populations of great crested newts in Britain. There are also grass snakes, smooth newts and slowworms.
Edwardstone Woods	Edwardstone Woods	✓		27.0 hectares (67 acres)	NO	Sudbury; 52.046°N 0.819°E; TL 934 424		Map	Citation	These are ancient coppice with standards woods, which are mainly ash, maple and hazel, but there are large stands of hornbeam and small-leaved lime in some areas. The diverse ground flora is typical of Suffolk boulder clay soils.
Elmsett Park Wood	Elmsett Park Wood	✓		8.6 hectares (21 acres)	NO	Ipswich; 52.077°N 1.012°E; TM 065 464		Map	Citation	This coppice with standards site has diverse woodland types and ground flora. Plants indicative of ancient woodland include nettle-leaved bellflower, wood spurge, butterfly orchid and the uncommon spurge laurel.
Eriswell Low Warren	Eriswell Low Warren	✓		7.4 hectares (18 acres)	NO	Brandon; 52.384°N 0.554°E; TL 739 793	NCR, SPA	Map	Citation	The site is mainly unimproved acidic grassland on sandy soils, which has a variety of typical Breckland flora, and there are also areas of lichens and bryophytes. Rare plants include purple-stem cat's-tail, spring speedwell, Spanish catchfly and perennial knawel.
Fakenham Wood and Sapiston Great Grove	Fakenham Wood	✓		200.7 hectares (496 acres)	NO	Bury St Edmunds; 52.36°N 0.83°E; TL 928 773		Map	Citation	These two coppice with standards woods comprise one of the largest areas of ancient woodland in the county. The ground flora is dominated by bracken and bramble, but there are also rides which provide habitats for butterflies, including the largest colony of white admirals in Suffolk.
Ferry Cliff, Sutton	Ferry Cliff		✓	2.8 hectares (6.9 acres)	FP	Woodbridge; 52.089°N 1.324°E; TM 278 486	GCR, SCHAONB	Map	Citation	This site exposes rocks dating to the paleocene, around 60 million years ago. It has the oldest British fossils of rodents, and ungulates, both even and odd toed. It also has early hyracotheriums.
Flixton Quarry	Flixton Quarry		✓	0.2 hectares (0.49 acres)	YES	Bungay; 52.423°N 1.367°E; TM 290 859	GCR	Map	Citation	This site has sands and gravels which are thought to be a glacial outwash dating to the most extreme ice age of the Pleistocene epoch, the Anglian glaciation around 450,000 years ago. It is described by Natural England as important because of its relationship with deposits of the succeeding Hoxnian Stage.
Fox Fritillary Meadow	Fox Fritillary Meadow	✓		2.4 hectares (5.9 acres)	NO	Stowmarket; 52.2°N 1.202°E; TM 189 606	SWT	Map	Citation	This unimproved meadow is located on heavy alluvial soils at the bottom of a valley. It has a rich variety of flora, including the herbs cowslip, cuckooflower and ragged robin, together with the largest population in East Anglia of the rare snake's head fritillary.
Foxhole Heath	Foxhole Heath	✓		85.2 hectares (211 acres)	YES	Brandon; 52.37°N 0.55°E; TL 736 781	NCR, SAC, SPA	Map	Citation	The heath is mainly covered by lichens and mosses, with smaller areas of heather and grassland. Much of it is grazed by rabbits. There are three nationally rare plants, and one rare bird, the Eurasian stone-curlew: over one percent of this species in Britain breed on the site, and they also use it as a gathering ground for their autumn migration.
Freston and Cutler's Woods with Holbrook Park	Cutler's Wood	✓		142.0 hectares (351 acres)	PP	Ipswich; 52.01°N 1.14°E; TM 153 388	SCHAONB	Map	Citation	These ancient woods have woodland types typical of spring-fed valleys and light sandy soils. Holbrook Park has coppice stools over 3 metres in diameter, among the largest in Britain. Sweet chestnut, which was introduced in the Middle Ages, is found widely, and other trees include the rare wild service tree.
Frithy and Chadacre Woods	Frithy Wood	✓		28.7 hectares (71 acres)	YES	Bury St Edmunds; 52.15°N 0.72°E; TL 859 536		Map	Citation	These are ancient semi-natural woods of the wet ash and maple type. The diverse ground flora includes early purple orchid, twayblade, gromwell and bluebell.
The Gardens, Great Ashfield	The Gardens, Great Ashfield	✓		3.8 hectares (9.4 acres)	NO	Bury St Edmunds; 52.274°N 0.927°E; TL 998 680		Map	Citation	These ancient meadows are traditionally managed by grazing and cutting for hay. They have a rich variety of flora, such as green-winged orchid, bee orchid, common twayblade, pepper saxifrage, adder's tongue fern and ox-eye daisy.
Gedgrave Hall Pit	Gedgrave Hall Pit		✓	0.6 hectares (1.5 acres)	NO	Woodbridge; 52.083°N 1.509°E; TM 405 485	GCR, SCHAONB	Map	Citation	The site consists to two pits dating to the early Pliocene Coralline Crag Formation. The smaller pit has many well-preserved mollusc fossils, whereas those in the larger pit are highly abraded and poorly preserved.
Gipping Great Wood	Gipping Great Wood	✓		25.9 hectares (64 acres)	NO	Stowmarket; 52.221°N 1.036°E; TM 075 624		Map	Citation	This is an ancient coppice with standards wood with a variety of woodland types. There are many hornbeams, and other trees include oak and ash. Wet rides, a pond and a stream provide additional ecological interest.
Glemsford Pits	Glemsford Pits	✓		33.2 hectares (82 acres)	PP	Sudbury; 52.085°N 0.681°E; TL 838 463		Map (Note: This site is partly in Essex)	Citation	Thirteen species of dragonfly and damselfly have been recorded in these former gravel workings, including one which is rare in Britain, the ruddy darter dragonfly. Aquatic plants include the yellow water-lily and mare's tail.
The Glen Chalk Caves, Bury St Edmunds	The Glen Chalk Caves	✓		1.6 hectares (4.0 acres)	PP	Bury St Edmunds; 52.248°N 0.729°E; TL 864 646		Map	Citation	Tunnels totalling 200 metres in length radiate from a chalk pit, which also contains a disused lime kiln. The tunnels and kiln are used by five species of bat for hibernation, and the surrounding vegetation helps to maintain a suitable micro-climate in the caves. The principal species are Daubenton's, Natterer's and brown long-eared bats.
Gosbeck Wood	Gosbeck Wood	✓		22.8 hectares (56 acres)	YES	Ipswich; 52.159°N 1.134°E; TM 145 556		Map	Citation	This is an ancient coppice with standards wood mainly on boulder clay, with some areas of sandy soil. Dog's mercury is dominant in the ground flora, and other plants include spurge laurel, wood spurge, herb paris and hairy woodrush.
Great Blakenham Pit	Great Blakenham Pit		✓	2.3 hectares (5.7 acres)	NO	Great Blakenham; 52.107°N 1.087°E; TM 115 499	GCR	Map	Citation	This is described by Natural England as a key site for Pleistocene studies. It has a sequence of early and middle Pleistocene deposits, including from the ancient course of the River Thames through East Anglia, and from the severe Anglian ice age around 450,000 years ago.
Gromford Meadow	Gromford Meadow	✓		1.7 hectares (4.2 acres)	NO	Saxmundham; 52.175°N 1.488°E; TM 386 587		Map	Citation	This unimproved base-rich meadow is fed by springs. It has diverse flora with meadowsweet dominant, and other plants include yellow rattle, meadow foxtail, ragged robin, marsh thistle and lesser spearwort.
Groton Wood	Groton Wood	✓		20.2 hectares (50 acres)	YES	Sudbury; 52.051°N 0.882°E; TL 977 431	SWT	Map	Citation	Fifteen species of butterfly have been recorded in this wood, including brimstones, speckled woods and purple hairstreaks. There are many wild cherry trees, and twenty-two seasonal ponds, which have scarce and protected great crested newts.
Gypsy Camp Meadows, Thrandeston	Gypsy Camp Meadows	✓		2.4 hectares (5.9 acres)	NO	Diss; 52.353°N 1.101°E; TM 113 773		Map	Citation	These wet meadows on poorly drained boulder clay have a rich variety of flora, and drainage ditches, areas of drier grassland and hedges add to the diversity. Plants include early purple orchid, ragged robin, zig-zag clover and water avens.
Hascot Hill Pit	Hascot Hill Pit		✓	0.3 hectares (0.74 acres)	NO	Stowmarket; 52.143°N 1.009°E; TM 060 537	GCR	Map	Citation	This is the only known site to expose beach deposits of the late Pliocene and early Pleistocene Red Crag Formation. It has beach cobbles and fossils from a littoral fauna, whereas other Red Crag sites have deposits from deeper water facies.
Hay Wood, Whepstead	Hay Wood, Whepstead	✓		10.4 hectares (26 acres)	NO	Bury St Edmunds; 52.189°N 0.645°E; TL 809 578		Map	Citation	This ancient wood on poorly drained boulder clay has coppice trees of small-leaved lime and field maple with an understorey of hazel. Flora include wood spurge, herb Paris, ramsons and early purple orchid.
High House Meadows, Monewden	High House Meadows	✓		3.0 hectares (7.4 acres)	NO	Woodbridge; 52.176°N 1.254°E; TM 226 581		Map	Citation	These unimproved meadows have diverse herbs typical of clay pastures. There are scarce species such as autumn crocus, green-winged orchid, sulphur clover and adders-tongue fern.
Hintlesham Woods	Hintlesham Woods	✓		118.1 hectares (292 acres)	PP	Ipswich; 52.05°N 1.01°E; TM 063 433	RSPB, NCR	Map	Citation	These ancient coppice with standards woods are mainly oak with some ash and birch. The soils are boulder clay, which is covered in some areas with glacial sands. Ground flora include green hellebore, bird's-nest orchid and wood spurge.
Holton Pit	Holton Pit		✓	1.6 hectares (4.0 acres)	YES	Halesworth; 52.342°N 1.529°E; TM 405 774	GCR	Map	Citation	This is the only site known to show the sequence of the early Pleistocene Westleton Beds together with the overlying Kesgrave Gravels. The Westleton Beds are a coastal gravel accumulation, and the site is close to their inland boundary and throws light on their spatial limits.
Hopton Fen	Hopton Fen	✓		15.3 hectares (38 acres)	YES	Diss; 52.382°N 0.922°E; TL 990 800	SWT	Map	Citation	This reed-dominated fen has diverse flora, including devil's bit scabious, black bog-rush, bogbeana and early marsh orchid. The SWT is improving the site by excavating new pools, and introducing grazing to restore the open landscape.
Horringer Court Caves	Horringer Court Caves	✓		3.8 hectares (9.4 acres)	NO	Bury St Edmunds; 52.233°N 0.687°E; TL 836 628		Map	Citation	This site has over 500 metres (1,600 feet) of chalk mines, with five grilled entrances, which are used by bats for hibernation. They have been the subject of research since 1947. The main bats using the caves are Daubenton's, but other species include the very rare barbastelle, which have been recorded eight times in 36 years.
How Hill Track	How Hill Track	✓		3.1 hectares (7.7 acres)	YES	Bury St Edmunds; 52.358°N 0.573°E; TL 753 764	SPA	Map	Citation	This is a grassland site which provides suitable conditions for seven rare plants, including perennial knawel, small alison, purple-stem cat's tail and sickle medick.
Hoxne Brick Pit	Hoxne Brick Pit		✓	1.3 hectares (3.2 acres)	NO	Eye; 52.344°N 1.192°E; TM 175 766	GCR	Map	Citation	In 1797, John Frere suggested that flint hand axes, which he found on this site in a deposit twelve feet deep, were weapons dating to a remote period, and this is the earliest recognition that hand axes were made by early humans. The world famous site also provides the type deposits of the Hoxnian Stage, an interglacial between around 424,000 and 374,000 years ago, which is named after the site.
Iken Wood	Iken Wood	✓		5.3 hectares (13 acres)	NO	Woodbridge; 52.155°N 1.498°E; TM 394 565	SCHAONB	Map	Citation	This is probably the only ancient coppice wood on blown sand in Britain. Massive oak standards are dominant, and there are stools with a diameter of 3 metres (10 feet). Other trees include silver birch, holly and rowan.
Ipswich Heaths	Ipswich Heaths	✓		39.4 hectares (97 acres)	YES	Ipswich; 52.049°N 1.246°E; TM 227 439		Map	Citation	The site consists of two separate areas in Martlesham Heath and Purdis Heath. They contain heather heath and acid grassland, with clumps of bracken and gorse. This mosaic of habitats is valuable for butterflies. such as the silver-studded blue, common blue and small heath.
Kentwell Woods	Kentwell Woods	✓		77.6 hectares (192 acres)	PP	Sudbury; 52.12°N 0.71°E; TL 856 496		Map	Citation	There is a variety of different woodland types in this site, and the most common is the wet ash and maple, with hazel also common. They were managed as coppice with standards in the past, and have ground vegetation which is typical of ancient woods.
Knettishall Heath	Knettishall Heath	✓		91.7 hectares (227 acres)	YES	Thetford; 52.39°N 0.87°E; TL 951 804	SWT	Map	Citation	The site is heath and grassland, mainly on acidic soils, with areas of secondary woodland and wet hollows. There are heathland plants such as sheep's sorrel, tormentil, harebell and heath bedstraw, while wet areas have fen vegetation including water mint and yellow iris.
Lackford Lakes	Lackford Lakes	✓		105.8 hectares (261 acres)	YES	Bury St Edmunds; 52.3°N 0.64°E; TL 803 707	SWT	Map	Citation	The lakes are disused sand and gravel pits in the valley of the River Lark. There are diverse dragonfly species, and many breeding and overwintering birds, including nationally important numbers of gadwalls and shovelers. Skylarks breed on dry grassland, and lapwings in marshy meadows.
Lakenheath Poor's Fen	Lakenheath Poor's Fen	✓		5.2 hectares (13 acres)	NO	Brandon; 52.416°N 0.5°E; TL 701 827		Map	Citation	This is mainly fen with diverse flora, and there are also areas of damp grassland, ditches and dykes. The grassland is grazed by cattle, and it has flowering plants including marsh pennywort and cuckoo flower. The site has a nationally rare plant, marsh pea.
Lakenheath Warren	Lakenheath Warren	✓		588.3 hectares (1,454 acres)	PP	Brandon; 52.39°N 0.59°E; TL 766 804	NCR, SAC, SPA	Map	Citation	This is the largest remaining area of heath in the Breckland, and it has a history of use for sheep grazing and as a rabbit warren going back to the thirteenth century, and continuing until the Second World War. There are several rare lichens and plants, and over fifty species of breeding birds.
Landguard Common	Landguard Common	✓		30.5 hectares (75 acres)	YES	Felixstowe; 51.938°N 1.323°E; TM 285 318	LNR	Map	Citation	This spit on the southern outskirts of Felixstowe has a vegetated shingle beach, which is a fragile and rare habitat. Flora include sea kale, yellow horned poppy, sea sandwort, sea campion and sea pea. Areas of saltmarsh provide cover for small birds.
Laurel Farm Meadow	Laurel Farm Meadow	✓		1.6 hectares (4.0 acres)	YES	Halesworth; 52.381°N 1.41°E; TM 322 814		Map	Citation	This mesotrophic grassland site has diverse flora, and it is a type of meadow which is rare in Britain and not found in mainland Europe. The soil is chalky clay which is seasonally waterlogged. There are eleven species of grass, herbs such as fairy flax and cowslip, and many green-winged orchids.
Leiston - Aldeburgh	Leiston – Aldeburgh	✓		534.8 hectares (1,322 acres)	PP	Aldeburgh; 52.18°N 1.6°E; TM 463 597	LNR, RSPB, SCHAONB, SM, SPA	Map	Citation	This diverse site has open water, fen, acid grassland, scrub, woodland, heath and vegetated shingle. There are many breeding and overwintering birds, abundant dragonflies, and nationally scarce plants such as mossy stonecrop and clustered clover.
Lineage Wood & Railway Track, Long Melford	Lineage Wood & Railway Track, Long Melford	✓		78.7 hectares (194 acres)	PP	Sudbury; 52.1°N 0.76°E; TL 889 484		Map	Citation	Lineage Wood has neutral grassland rides with diverse flora, especially orchids such as the greater butterfly, fly orchid, common spotted and bee orchid. 22 species of butterfly have been recorded. The disused railway line also has floristically rich grassland, but the soil is more alkaline.
Lingwood Meadows	Lingwood Meadows	✓		2.7 hectares (6.7 acres)	NO	Stowmarket; 52.183°N 1.094°E; TM 116 584		Map	Citation	These ancient meadows are one of the few surviving examples of unimproved grassland in the county. They have diverse flora, and 20 grass species have been recorded with red fescue and Yorkshire fog dominant. 55 other species include the nationally scarce sulphur clover.
Little Blakenham Pit	Little Blakenham Pit	✓		3.4 hectares (8.4 acres)	NO	Ipswich; 52.1°N 1.076°E; TM 108 491		Map	Citation	A 127-metre (417-foot) tunnel from one of these chalk pits is used by hibernating bats, and it is one of the largest underground roosts known in Britain. Around 450 bats use the tunnel, mainly Daubenton's. Bats also share a lime kiln with a badger sett. The site also has chalk grassland.
Little Heath, Barnham	Little Heath, Barnham	✓		46.2 hectares (114 acres)	YES	Thetford; 52.37°N 0.72°E; TL 850 781	NCR, SPA	Map	Citation	Grazing by rabbits and sheep helps to keep the sward on parts of this site as open grassland, but some parts have been invaded by self-sown woodland. The diverse flora in areas grazed by sheep includes field woodrush, hare’s foot clover and harebell. Eurasian stone-curlews nest on short and open turf.
London Road Industrial Estate, Brandon	London Road Industrial Estate SSSI	✓		0.1 hectares (0.25 acres)	YES	Brandon; 52.439°N 0.607°E; TL 773 855		Map	Citation	This very small meadow in the middle of an industrial estate has been designated an SSSI because it has the largest known wild population in Britain of the nationally rare sunflower Artemisia campestris, which is thought to have survived due to periodic soil disturbance.
Lordswell Field	Lordswell Field	✓		3.2 hectares (7.9 acres)	YES	Brandon; 52.392°N 0.534°E; TL 725 801	NCR	Map	Citation	This area of calcareous Breckland heath has a rich variety of flora including two nationally rare plants, spanish catchfly and perennial knawel, the latter of which is protected under Section 13 of the Wildlife and Countryside Act 1981. There is also an area of lichen heath.
Maidscross Hill	Maidscross Hill	✓		44.8 hectares (111 acres)	YES	Brandon; 52.41°N 0.54°E; TL 728 823	LNR, NCR	Map	Citation	This very dry grassland has four nationally rare plants, Breckland wild thyme, Spanish catchfly, grape hyacinth and sickle medick. The site is not grazed, which has allowed invasion by bracken and scrub, but also increased the nesting sites for birds.
Major Farm Meadow	Major Farm Meadow	✓		1.8 hectares (4.4 acres)	NO	Eye; 52.309°N 1.108°E; TM 120 724		Map	Citation	This is one of the few surviving unimproved hay meadows in the county. It is damp grassland on boulder clay, with diverse flora and many molehills. Flowering plants include cowslip, twayblade and green-winged orchid, and there is a mature specimen of the rare black poplar.
Metfield Meadow	Metfield Meadow	✓		1.3 hectares (3.2 acres)	YES	Halesworth; 52.368°N 1.381°E; TM 303 798	SWT	Map	Citation	This meadow on a disused airfield is unimproved grassland, with a rich variety of flora on chalky boulder clay. There are many green-winged orchids, cowslips and pepper saxifrages. The meadow is grazed by cattle or cut for hay to maintain the diversity of the wild flowers.
Mickfield Meadow	Mickfield Meadow	✓		1.9 hectares (4.7 acres)	YES	Stowmarket; 52.225°N 1.136°E; TM 143 632	SWT	Map	Citation	Fertilisers and herbicides have never been used on this meadow, and as a result it has a rich variety of flora, including fritillary. The dominant grasses are meadow foxtail, cocksfoot, false oat-grass, timothy and Yorkshire fog.
Middle Wood, Offton	Middle Wood, Offton	✓		23.3 hectares (58 acres)	YES	Ipswich; 52.109°N 1.005°E; TM 059 499		Map	Citation	This is a medieval coppice with standards wood on wet boulder clay, and it has very diverse ground flora, including species typical of ancient woodland. Oak is the main standard tree, and there are orchids such as common twayblade, early purple orchid and butterfly orchid.
Milden Thicks	Milden Thicks	✓		42.3 hectares (105 acres)	NO	Ipswich; 52.06°N 0.84°E; TL 951 444		Map	Citation	These are diverse mature woods, described by Natural England as of national importance for the comparisons which can be made between them. There are several wild service trees, and the ground flora is rich and typical of ancient woodland.
Minsmere–Walberswick Heaths and Marshes	Minsmere-Walberswick Heaths and Marshes	✓		2,327.0 hectares (5,750 acres)	PP	Saxmundham; 52.28°N 1.62°E; TM 469 712	NCR, NNR, Ramsar, RSPB SAC, SCHAONB, SPA, SWT	Map	Citation	This is described by Natural England as a site of exceptional scientific interest, with areas of mudflats, shingle beach, reedbeds, heathland and grazing marsh. The marshes have many species of invertebrates, including rare ones, and the heathland is a habitat for two nationally declining birds, nightjars and woodlarks.
Moat Farm Meadows	Moat Farm Meadows	✓		3.3 hectares (8.2 acres)	NO	Ipswich; 52.161°N 1.246°E; TM 221 564		Map	Citation	These calcareous meadows are traditionally cut for hay. They have diverse flora, with many green-winged orchids and one of the largest populations in the county of meadow saffron. Other species include ox-eye daisy and cuckoo flower.
Monewden Meadows	Monewden Meadows	✓		3.7 hectares (9.1 acres)	YES	Woodbridge; 52.167°N 1.255°E; TM 227 571	NCR, SWT	Map	Citation	This site has rich flora, and it is described by Natural England as probably the best example in the county of unimproved calcareous clay and neutral grassland. The herb species are especially diverse, including meadow saffron and green-winged orchid, and there are ancient fruit trees.
Nacton Meadows	Nacton Meadows	✓		4.5 hectares (11 acres)	YES	Ipswich; 52.013°N 1.25°E; TM 231 399	SCHAONB	Map	Citation	This site has fen meadow and grasslands. Wetter areas have more diverse flora, including Yorkshire-fog, crested dog's tail, sharp-flowered rush, greater bird's-foot-trefoil and the uncommon marsh arrowgrass.
Neutral Farm Pit, Butley	Neutral Farm Pit		✓	1.1 hectares (2.7 acres)	YES	Woodbridge; 52.106°N 1.461°E; TM 371 510	GCR, SCHAONB	Map	Citation	This is described by Natural England as a classic site in the study of the Early Pleistocene in East Anglia. It was used by the nineteenth-century geologist Frederick W. Harmer to define his Butley division of the Red Crag Formation, and it has many fossils of marine molluscs.
Newbourne Springs	Newbourne Springs	✓		15.7 hectares (39 acres)	YES	Woodbridge; 52.043°N 1.307°E; TM 269 435	SWT	Map	Citation	Most of this site is a narrow valley with a fast-flowing stream with alder carr and fen. Drier and more acidic soils have grassland, woodland, scrub and bracken heath. The site is actively managed, producing diverse flora and many breeding and migratory birds such as treecreepers, nuthatches and sedge warblers.
Newmarket Heath	Newmarket Heath	✓		279.3 hectares (690 acres)	PP	Newmarket; 52.24°N 0.37°E; TL 622 627		Map	Citation	Most of this site is chalk grassland, and it has areas of chalk heath, a rare habitat in Britain. There is a rich variety of flowering plants, including a nationally rare species listed in the British Red Data Book of threatened species and five nationally uncommon ones. The dominant grasses are upright brome and sheep's fescue.
Norton Wood	Norton Wood	✓		24.8 hectares (61 acres)	YES	Bury St Edmunds; 52.243°N 0.886°E; TL 971 645		Map	Citation	This ancient coppice with standards wood is on sand and loess over boulder clay. There are many pedunculate oak, hazel, ash and birch trees. The ground flora includes a number of uncommon plants such as oxlip.
Orwell Estuary	Orwell Estuary	✓		1,335.5 hectares (3,300 acres)	PP	Ipswich; 52°N 1.23°E; TM 221 380	Ramsar, SCHAONB, SPA, SWT	Map	Citation	The estuary is described by Natural England as of national importance for its breeding avocets, its other breeding and wintering birds, its vascular plants and its intertidal mud habitats. It also has a rich and diverse assemblage of invertebrates and a nationally important community of algae.
Over and Lawn Woods	Over and Lawn Woods	✓		45.3 hectares (112 acres)	NO	Haverhill; 52.11°N 0.39°E; TL 635 483		Map	Citation	These are ancient coppice with standards woods on chalky boulder clay, and the dominant trees are pedunculate oak and ash. The fauna and flora is diverse, including the nationally restricted oxlip. A stream and pond provide additional ecological interest.
Pakefield to Easton Bavents	Pakefield to Easton Bavents	✓	✓	735.4 hectares (1,817 acres)	PP	Beccles; 52.38°N 1.7°E; TM 519 818	GCR NNR, SCHAONB, SAC, SPA	Map	Citation	The site is described by Natural England as nationally important for its exposures of the Lower Pleistocene Norwich Crag Formation, its vegetated shingle features, saline lagoons, flood-plain fens, its nationally scarce vascular plants, and its scarce breeding birds and wintering bitterns.
Pakenham Meadows	Pakenham Meadows	✓		5.8 hectares (14 acres)	YES	Bury St Edmunds; 52.282°N 0.834°E; TL 934 686		Map	Citation	This unimproved and poorly drained meadow has a variety of soil types from loam to peat, and the vegetation types are correspondingly diverse. The herb-rich grassland has yellow rattle, bugle, fen bedstraw, oxe-eye daisy, ragged robin and southern marsh orchid.
Pashford Poor's Fen, Lakenheath	Pashford Poor's Fen	✓		12.4 hectares (31 acres)	NO	Lakenheath; 52.423°N 0.546°E; TL 732 836		Map	Citation	This diverse site has species rich meadows, hollows with fen and marshes, birch woodland, scrub and reedbeds. The invertebrate fauna is diverse, and includes the last known British site for a beetle listed on the Red Data Book of Threatened Species.
Potton Hall Fields, Westleton	Potton Hall Fields	✓		16.7 hectares (41 acres)	NO	Saxmundham; 52.278°N 1.599°E; TM 456 705	SCHAONB	Map	Citation	This site comprises two gently sloping fields on sandy, well drained soil. It has been designated an SSSI because it has a population of several thousand plants of the nationally rare red-tipped cudweed in large patches. The plant is only found in two other counties in Britain.
RAF Lakenheath	RAF Lakenheath	✓		111.0 hectares (274 acres)	NO	Brandon; 52.41°N 0.56°E; TL 743 822	SAC	Map	Citation	This grassland site on well-drained sandy soils has more rare plants than any other site in the county, including perennial knawel, Breckland thyme, wild grape hyacinth, sand catchfly, drooping brome and smooth rupturewort. There are also 22 nationally rare and 47 nationally scarce invertebrates.
Ramsholt Cliff	Ramsholt Cliff		✓	2.1 hectares (5.2 acres)	PP	Woodbridge; 52.035°N 1.348°E; TM 297 427	GCR, SCHAONB	Map	Citation	This site is very important historically because it was the basis for the distinction of the Pliocene Coralline Crag Formation as a new stratigraphical division by the nineteenth-century geologist, Edward Charlesworth. The well preserved fossils include several unusual species.
Red House Farm Pit	Red House Farm Pit		✓	0.5 hectares (1.2 acres)	YES	Woodbridge; 52.137°N 1.557°E; TM 435 547	GCR, SCHAONB	Map	Citation	This pit exposes a 3.5 metres (11 feet) section of the sandwave facies of the Pliocene Coralline Crag Formation. It has many bryozoan fossils.
Red Lodge Heath	Red Lodge Heath	✓		20.8 hectares (51 acres)	YES	Bury St Edmunds; 52.302°N 0.487°E; TL 697 700		Map	Citation	Habitats on this site are chalk grassland, dry acid grassland, lichen heath, wet woodland and ponds. It has nationally important assemblages of rare plants and invertebrates, including a nationally important population of the five-banded tailed digger wasp. It has several other invertebrate species on the IUCN Red List of Threatened Species, and plants include the nationally rare smooth rupturewort.
Redgrave and Lopham Fens	Redgrave and Lopham Fens	✓		127.0 hectares (314 acres)	YES	Diss; 52.38°N 1.01°E; TM 049 796	NCR, NNR, Ramsar, SAC, SWT	Map	Citation	This spring-fed valley at the head of the River Waveney has several different types of fen vegetation. There are aquatic plants such as bladderwort, fen pondweed and Charophytes, all of which are indicators of low levels of pollution. The site has the only known British population of fen raft spiders.
Rex Graham Reserve	Rex Graham Reserve	✓		2.8 hectares (6.9 acres)	NO	Bury St Edmunds; 52.342°N 0.548°E; TL 737 746	SAC, SPA	Map	Citation	This former chalk pit has the largest population of the nationally rare military orchid, and one of only two known in Britain. It also has many bushes of the uncommon mezereon.
Richmond Farm Pit, Gedgrave	Richmond Farm Pit		✓	0.6 hectares (1.5 acres)	NO	Woodbridge; 52.089°N 1.519°E; TM 412 492	GCR, SCHAONB	Map	Citation	This pit shows the Coralline Crag Formation of the Pliocene. It is described by Natural England as especially notable for its excellent exposure of the sandwave facies of the Coralline Crag, but it has very few fossils, which have been transported elsewhere by wave action.
Riverside House Meadow	Riverside House Meadow	✓		1.4 hectares (3.5 acres)	NO	Woodbridge; 52.105°N 1.275°E; TM 244 503		Map	Citation	This unimproved grassland is traditionally managed with a hay cut in the summer, and it has diverse grasses and herbs. The number of such meadows has declined considerably due to changes in agriculture. Eleven grass species and 52 other plants have been recorded.
Rockhall Wood Pit, Sutton	Rockhall Wood Pit		✓	5.3 hectares (13 acres)	PP	Woodbridge; 52.046°N 1.358°E; TM 304 439	GCR, SCHAONB	Map	Citation	This site has excellent exposures of the Pliocene Coralline Crag Formation, with a vertical sequence of diagenetic changes and rich fossil fauna. It is described by Natural England as probably the most important Pliocene site in Britain.
Round Hill Pit, Aldeburgh	Round Hill Pit		✓	0.5 hectares (1.2 acres)	NO	Aldeburgh; 52.16°N 1.572°E; TM 444 573	GCR, SCHAONB	Map	Citation	This site has a 2.5-metre (8.2-foot) exposure of rocks dating to the Coralline Crag Formation of the early Pliocene, around five million years ago. It has many horizontal burrows, and is unusual because it has fossils in aragonite, which rarely survive because this mineral is soluble in water.
Sandlings Forest	Sandlings Forest	✓		2,483.8 hectares (6,138 acres)	YES	Woodbridge; 52.11°N 1.45°E; TM 363 512	SCHAONB, SPA	Map	Citation	These commercial coniferous plantations are designated an SSSI for their internationally important bird populations. Surveys in the 1990s found 81 singing nightjars, around 2% of the number in Britain, and 71 woodlarks, approximately 5% of the British population.
Sandy Lane Pit, Barham	Sandy Lane Pit, Barham		✓	11.1 hectares (27 acres)	NO	Ipswich; 52.121°N 1.117°E; TM 135 515	GCR	Map	Citation	This site has deposits which span the period from the Beestonian Stage, which ended around 866,000 years ago, through to the severe ice age of the Anglian, which started around 478,000 years ago. It has Beestonian deposits thought to have been laid down by the proto-Thames, and a paleosol, a former land surface dating to the Anglian.
Sinks Valley, Kesgrave	Sinks Valley	✓		24.9 hectares (62 acres)	NO	Ipswich; 52.07°N 1.247°E; TM 226 463		Map	Citation	This site has diverse semi-natural habitats, with alder and oak woodland, a brook with fringing swamp, wet and dry grassland, spring fed fen and heath. Areas grazed by rabbits have a short turf rich in lichens, mosses and herbs. The nationally uncommon mossy stonecrop grows on paths.
Sizewell Marshes	Sizewell Marshes	✓		105.4 hectares (260 acres)	YES	Leiston; 52.22°N 1.61°E; TM 465 638	SCHAONB, SWT	Map	Citation	These unimproved wet meadows are described by Natural England as important for their outstanding assemblages of invertebrates, with many nationally rare and scarce species, and of national significance for its assemblage of breeding birds typical of wet grassland. The aquatic fauna is diverse, including the nationally scarce soft hornwort and fen pondweed.
Snape Warren	Snape Warren	✓		48.0 hectares (119 acres)	YES	Saxmundham; 52.17°N 1.52°E; TM 406 578	SCHAONB, SPA	Map	Citation	This site on sandy soils is an example of the lowland heath of eastern England, which has greatly declined since the 1940s. The heath, which is dominated by ling, is interspersed with areas of acid grassland, where the most common grasses are common bent and sheep's fescue.
Sotterley Park	Sotterley Park	✓		123.2 hectares (304 acres)	FP	Beccles; 52.41°N 1.62°E; TM 460 852	NCR	Map	Citation	This park was laid out in the eighteenth century, but it goes back at least to the early medieval period, and may retain areas of primary forest. It has many large and ancient trees, which have the richest epiphytic lichen flora in East Anglia, with 92 recorded species. There are also 14 species of bryophytes.
Sprat's Water and Marshes, Carlton Colville	Sprat's Water and Marshes	✓		57.1 hectares (141 acres)	PP	Lowestoft; 52.47°N 1.69°E; TM 506 922	Ramsar, SAC, SPA, SWT	Map	Citation	The site has open water, mixed fen, alder carr and wet grazing marsh on thick peat. The diverse flora include a number of uncommon species, and the site is also important for breeding birds.
Stallode Wash, Lakenheath	Stallode Wash, Lakenheath	✓		34.1 hectares (84 acres)	FP	Brandon; 52.44°N 0.463°E; TL 675 853		Map	Citation	This is grassland, fen and reedswamp, which is seasonally flooded by the River Little Ouse, and there are smaller areas of permanent open water. There are two nationally rare plants, water germander and marsh pea.
Stanton Woods	Stanton Woods	✓		66.1 hectares (163 acres)	PP	Bury St Edmunds; 52.31°N 0.88°E; TL 962 719		Map	Citation	The site consists of several ancient coppice with standards woods, some of which are on boulder clay and others on drier, acid soil. There are also mown rides, small clearings and a linear wooded gorge called The Grundle.
Staverton Park and The Thicks, Wantisden	Staverton Park and The Thicks	✓		80.3 hectares (198 acres)	FP	Woodbridge; 52.1°N 1.439°E; TM 356 507	NCR, SCHAONB, SAC	Map	Citation	This ancient park is woodland on sandy soil, with mature pollarded oaks, while The Thicks is a dense wood with hollies, some of them thought to be the largest in Britain. There is a rich lichen flora, and invertebrates include rare species.
Stoke Tunnel Cutting, Ipswich	Stoke Tunnel Cutting, Ipswich		✓	2.2 hectares (5.4 acres)	NO	Ipswich; 52.046°N 1.15°E; TM 161 433	GCR	Map	Citation	This fossiliferous site dates to the late Marine Isotope Stage 7, around 190,000 years ago. It is part of a high level terrace of the River Orwell and it has fossils of European pond tortoises, lions, mammoths, woolly rhinoceroses, horses and voles.
Stour Estuary	Stour Estuary	✓	✓	2,248.0 hectares (5,555 acres)	PP	Wrabness; 51.95°N 1.16°E; TM 173 327	GCR, NCR, Ramsar, RSPB, SCHAONB, SPA	Map	Citation	The estuary is nationally important for thirteen species of wintering wildfowl and three on autumn passage, and also for coastal saltmarsh, sheltered muddy shores, two scarce marine invertebrates, rare plant assemblages and three geological sites.
Sudbourne Park Pit	Sudbourne Park Pit		✓	1.1 hectares (2.7 acres)	YES	Woodbridge; 52.108°N 1.514°E; TM 407 513	GCR, SCHAONB	Map	Citation	This is described by Natural England as an important site for the study of the fauna of the Coralline Crag Formation, dating to the early Pliocene, around five million years ago. The fossils are plentiful and diverse, especially bivalves and molluscs.
Sutton and Hollesley Heaths	Sutton and Hollesley Heaths	✓		483.3 hectares (1,194 acres)	YES	Woodbridge; 52.07°N 1.4°E; TM 332 469	SCHAONB, SPA, SWT	Map	Citation	These remnants of the formerly extensive sandy heaths of the Suffolk coast consist of dry grass and heather heathland, together with areas of bracken, scrub and pine and birch woodland. Breeding birds include long-eared owls, and hen harriers roost there in the winter.
Thetford Heaths	Thetford Heath	✓	✓	270.6 hectares (669 acres)	PP	Thetford; 52.39°N 0.72°E; TL 851 801	GCR, NCR, NNR, SAC, SPA	Map	Citation	A large part of this dry heathland site is calacareous grassland, and some areas are grazed by sheep or rabbits. There are several nationally rare plants, an uncommon heathland bird, and many lichens and mosses.
Thorpe Morieux Woods	Thorpe Morieux Woods	✓		45.2 hectares (112 acres)	PP	Bury St Edmunds; 52.16°N 0.84°E; TL 942 549	SWT	Map	Citation	These ancient semi-natural woods are managed by coppicing. The soil is poorly drained boulder clay, and common trees include pedunculate oak. Bramble and dog's mercury are dominant in the ground flora, with extensive oxlip in some areas.
Titsal Wood, Shadingfield	Titsal Wood, Shadingfield	✓		14.7 hectares (36 acres).	NO	Beccles; 52.4°N 1.564°E; TM 426 836		Map	Citation	This ancient coppice with standards wood is mainly hornbeam, but it also has young oak and ash standards. The ground flora is rich and ancient, including common spotted orchid, wood bitter-cress and the rare thin-spiked wood sedge.
Trundley and Wadgell's Wood, Great Thurlow	Trundley Wood	✓		79.4 hectares (196 acres)	NO	Haverhill; 52.13°N 0.47°E; TL 695 503		Map	Citation	These semi-natural woods on boulder clay soils are mostly ancient coppice with standards, with pedunculate oak as the main standard trees. They have ground flora typical of ancient woodland such as early purple orchid, yellow archangel and sanicle. There are wide grassy rides which are dominated by Yorkshire fog.
Tunstall Common	Tunstall Common	✓		36.6 hectares (90 acres)	YES	Woodbridge; 52.141°N 1.474°E; TM 378 549	SCHAONB, SPA	Map	Citation	Most of this dry lowland heath is dominated by heather, with diverse lichens and mosses. There are also areas of acid grassland, which are being invaded by gorse and bracken. Pine scrub is encroaching from neighbouring plantations.
Valley Farm Pit, Sudbourne	Valley Farm Pit		✓	0.5 hectares (1.2 acres)	NO	Woodbridge; 52.122°N 1.556°E; TM 435 530	GCR, SCHAONB	Map	Citation	A shelly, fossilerous Pleistocene layer lies unconformably above a Pliocene Coralline Crag Formation layer. It is described by Natural England as important both for sedimentological studies and for understanding the local relationship between the Pliocene and the Pleistocene.
Waldringfield Pit	Waldringfield Pit		✓	0.8 hectares (2.0 acres)	NO	Woodbridge; 52.055°N 1.295°E; TM 260 448	GCR	Map	Citation	This site exposes a sequence of Pleistocene deposits, including the Waldringfield Gravels, the lowest unit of the Kesgrave Sands and Gravels, which were deposits on the bed of the River Thames before it was diverted south by the Anglian Glaciation around 450,000 years ago. Waldringfield Pit is the type site for the Waldringfield Gravels.
Wangford Warren and Carr	Wangford Warren and Carr	✓		67.8 hectares (168 acres)	PP	Brandon; 52.42°N 0.58°E; TL 755 839	NCR, SAC, SPA, SWT	Map	Citation	According to Natural England, this site has the best preserved system of active sand dunes in Breckland, together with typical Breckland plants and the rare grey hair-grass. There are also areas of lichen heath and dry grassland.
Weather and Horn Heaths, Eriswell	Weather and Horn Heaths	✓		133.3 hectares (329 acres)	YES	Brandon; 52.37°N 0.62°E; TL 783 774	NCR, SAC, SPA	Map	Citation	There are areas of acidic grassland and heather, together with large parts dominated by mosses and lichens. Grazing by rabbits and stock has kept plants short and the habitat open.
West Stow Heath	West Stow Heath	✓		44.3 hectares (109 acres)	YES	Bury St Edmunds; 52.31°N 0.63°E; TL 792 714	SPA	Map	Citation	This site has diverse habitats with grassland, heath, wet woodland, scrub, dry woodland and former gravel workings which are now open water. The grassland has three nationally rare plants, glaucous fescue, Breckland wild thyme and spring speedwell.
Westhall Wood and Meadow	Westhall Wood	✓		43.1 hectares (107 acres)	NO	Diss; 52.32°N 0.98°E; TM 030 728		Map	Citation	The wood is ancient coppice with standards with mainly pedunculate oak and hornbeams dominant in the coppice layer. The unimproved meadow is poorly drained and species rich, with grasses including red fescue and Yorkshire fog.
Weston Fen	Weston Fen	✓		49.7 hectares (123 acres)	YES	Diss; 52.37°N 0.91°E; TL 980 786	SAC, SWT	Map	Citation	This spring-fed valley fen has a high and stable water table, and as a result it has a rich and varied flora. The dominant plants in the central fen area are saw sedge, the reed Phragmites australis and blunt-flowered rush. Other habitats include tall fen grassland, heath and a stream. There are many dragonflies and damselflies.
Wilde Street Meadow	Wilde Street Meadow	✓		11.6 hectares (29 acres)	NO	Lakenheath; 52.382°N 0.511°E; TL 710 790		Map	Citation	This site has a long history of traditional management, with low intensity summer grazing. It has areas of species-rich calcareous grassland, damp pasture, scrub and dykes. There is a large population of green-winged orchids.
Wortham Ling	Wortham Ling	✓		53.2 hectares (131 acres)	YES	Diss; 52.37°N 1.07°E; TM 092 795		Map	Citation	This site has acid grassland and dry heath on a sandy soil. Some areas are intensely grazed by rabbits, producing a very short sward which is a suitable habitat for lichens and mosses. Butterflies include many graylings.

== See also ==
- List of Local Nature Reserves in Suffolk
- National Nature Reserves in Suffolk
- Suffolk Wildlife Trust

== Sources ==
- Ratcliffe, Derek, ed. (1977). A Nature Conservation Review. Vol. 2. Cambridge, UK: Cambridge University Press. ISBN 0-521-21403-3.
- British Red Data Books. Vol. 1–3. Nature Conservancy Council; Joint Nature Conservation Committee. 1977–1999.
