= Freston and Cutler's Woods with Holbrook Park =

UK Site of Special Scientific Interest

Coordinates: 52.01°N 1.14°E

- Site of Special Scientific Interest
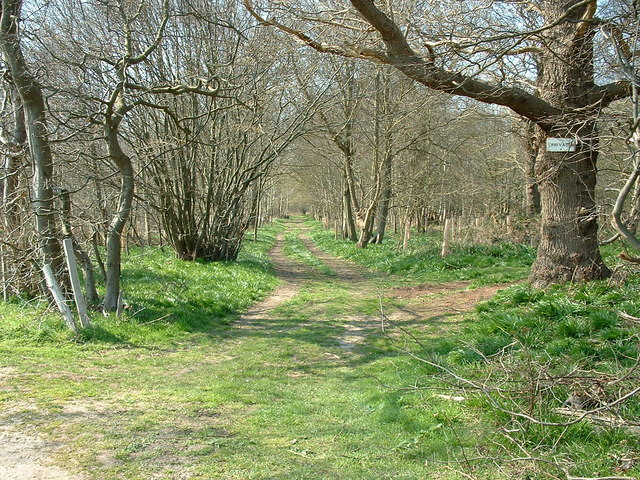
- Path in Cutler's Wood
- Location of Freston and Cutler's Woods with Holbrook Park.
- Area of search: Suffolk
- Grid reference: TM 153 388
- Interest: Biological
- Area: 142.0 hectares
- Notification date: 1986
- Location map: Magic Map

Freston and Cutler's Woods with Holbrook Park is a 142 hectare biological Site of Special Scientific Interest south of Ipswich in Suffolk. The site is in the Suffolk Coast and Heaths Area of Outstanding Natural Beauty

These ancient woods have woodland types typical of spring-fed valleys and light sandy soils. Holbrook Park has coppice stools over 3 metres in diameter, among the largest in Britain. Sweet chestnut, which was introduced in the Middle Ages, is found widely, and other trees include the rare wild service tree.

Holbrook Park is private, but a public footpath goes through Cutler's Wood.
