= Cavendish Woods =

UK Site of Special Scientific Interest

Coordinates: 52.11°N 0.61°E

- Site of Special Scientific Interest
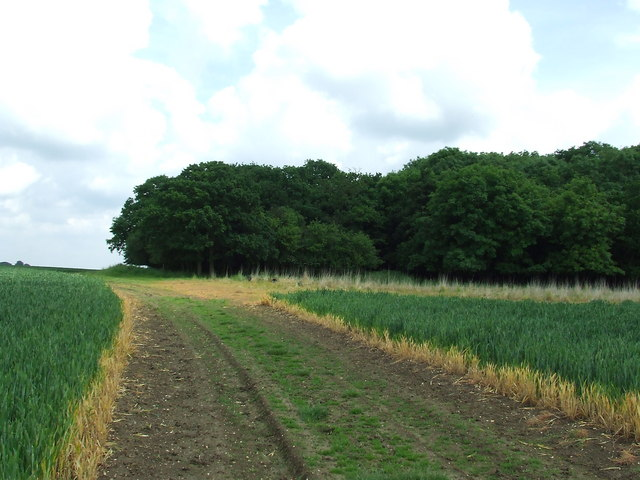
- King's Wood
- Location of Cavendish Woods.
- Area of search: Suffolk
- Grid reference: TL 791 495
- Interest: Biological
- Area: 53.5 hectares
- Notification date: 1985
- Location map: Magic Map

Cavendish Woods is a 53.5-hectare (132-acre) biological Site of Special Scientific Interest north-west of Glemsford in Suffolk.

These ancient woods are managed as coppice with standards. The main standard tree is oak, and the flora is diverse, including the uncommon oxlip. There are many fallow deer, and breeding birds include woodcock, snipe and treecreeper.

The woods are in four blocks, Shadowbush Wood adjacent to Long Wood, King's Wood, Northay Wood and Easty Wood. A public footpath goes through Easty Wood.
