= Kentwell Woods =

Woodlands in Suffolk, England

Coordinates: 52.12°N 0.71°E

- Site of Special Scientific Interest
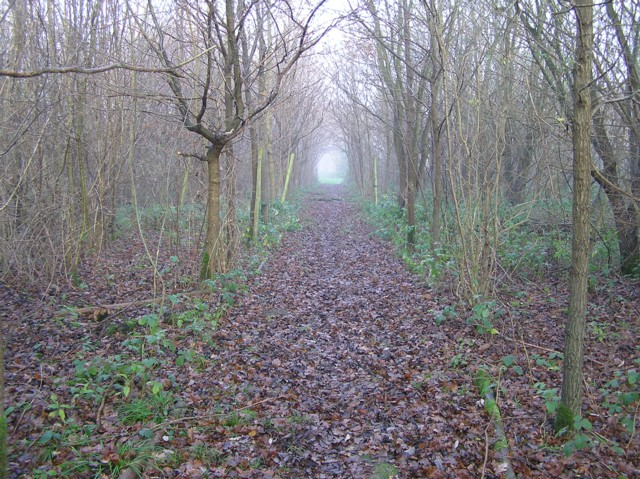
- Ashen Grove
- Location of Kentwell Woods.
- Area of search: Suffolk
- Interest: Biological
- Area: 77.6 hectares
- Notification date: 1987
- Location map: Magic Map

Kentwell Woods is a 77.6-hectare (192-acre) biological Site of Special Scientific Interest in fifteen woods in fourteen separate blocks east and north-east of Glemsford in Suffolk.

There is a variety of different woodland types in this site, and the most common is the wet ash and maple, with hazel also common. They were managed as coppice with standards in the past and have ground vegetation which is typical of ancient woods.
