= Gipping Great Wood =

UK Site of Special Scientific Interest

Coordinates: 52.221°N 1.036°E

- Site of Special Scientific Interest
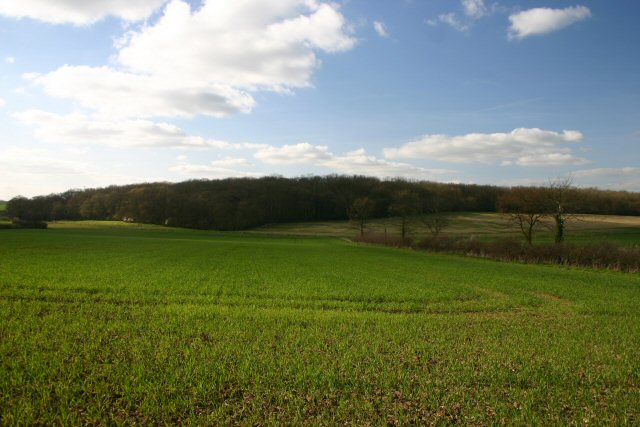
- Location of Gipping Great Wood.
- Area of search: Suffolk
- Grid reference: TM 075 624
- Interest: Biological
- Area: 25.9 hectares
- Notification date: 1985
- Location map: Magic Map

Gipping Great Wood is a 25.9-hectare (64-acre) biological Site of Special Scientific Interest south of Gipping in Suffolk.

This is an ancient coppice with standards wood with a variety of woodland types. There are many hornbeams, and other trees include oak and ash. Wet rides, a pond and a stream provide additional ecological interest.

The site is private land with no public access.
