= Creeting St Mary Pits =

Protected area in Suffolk, England

Coordinates: 52.157°N 1.063°E

- Site of Special Scientific Interest
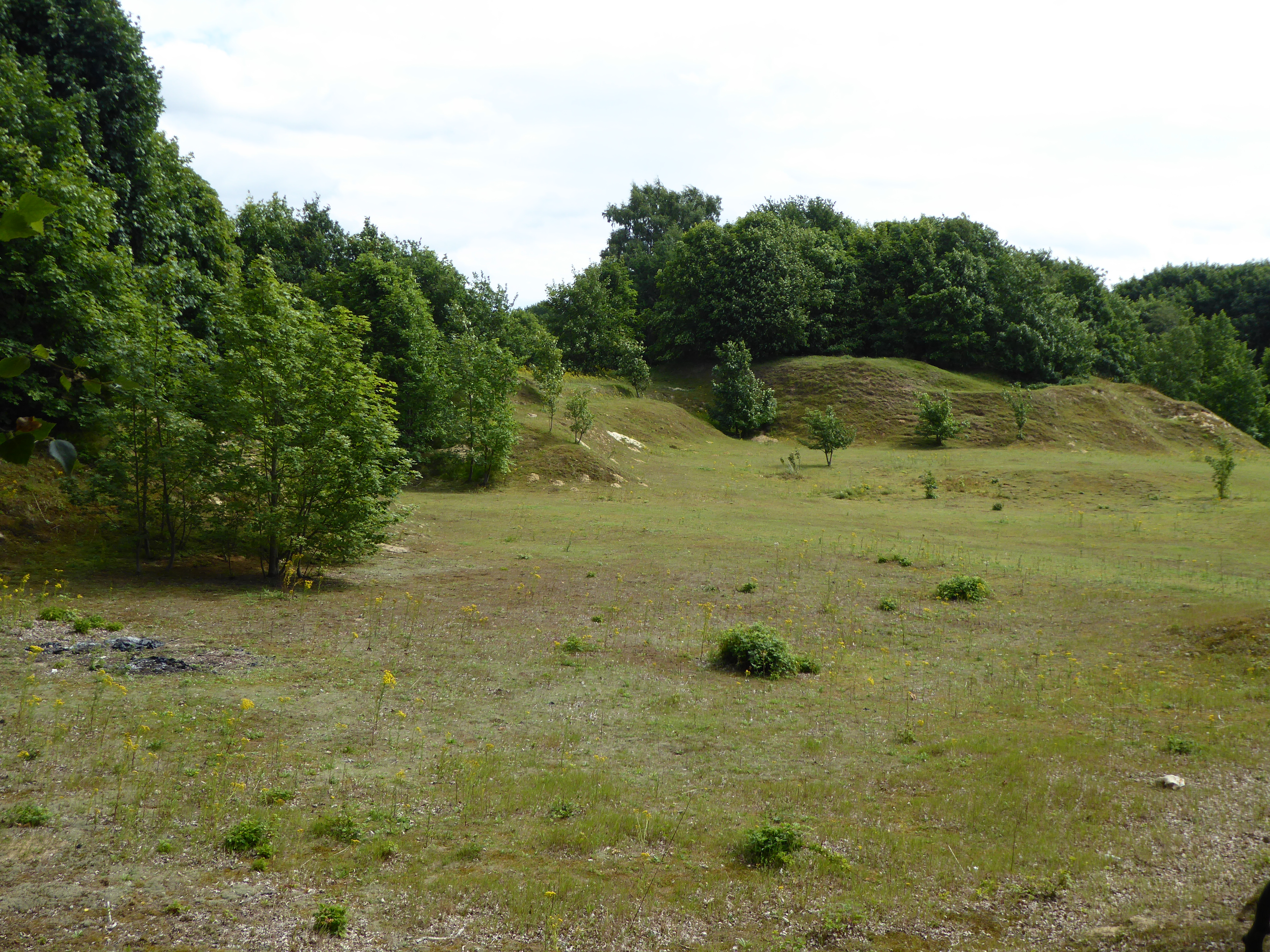
- Location of Creeting St Mary Pits.
- Area of search: Suffolk
- Grid reference: TM 096 554
- Interest: Geological
- Area: 5.4 hectares
- Notification date: 1987
- Location map: Magic Map

Creeting St Mary Pits is a 5.4-hectare (13-acre) geological Site of Special Scientific Interest south Creeting St Mary in Suffolk, England. It is a Geological Conservation Review site.

These former quarries are the type site for the 'Creeting Sands', which are believed to be intertidal and shallow marine deposits from an early Pleistocene interglacial. It is described by Natural England as a key stratigraphic site.

This site is in three areas, and there is public access to the southern one, but not to the northern ones.
