= Aldeburgh Brick Pit =

Protected area in Aldeburgh, England

Coordinates: 52.159°N 1.583°E

- Site of Special Scientific Interest
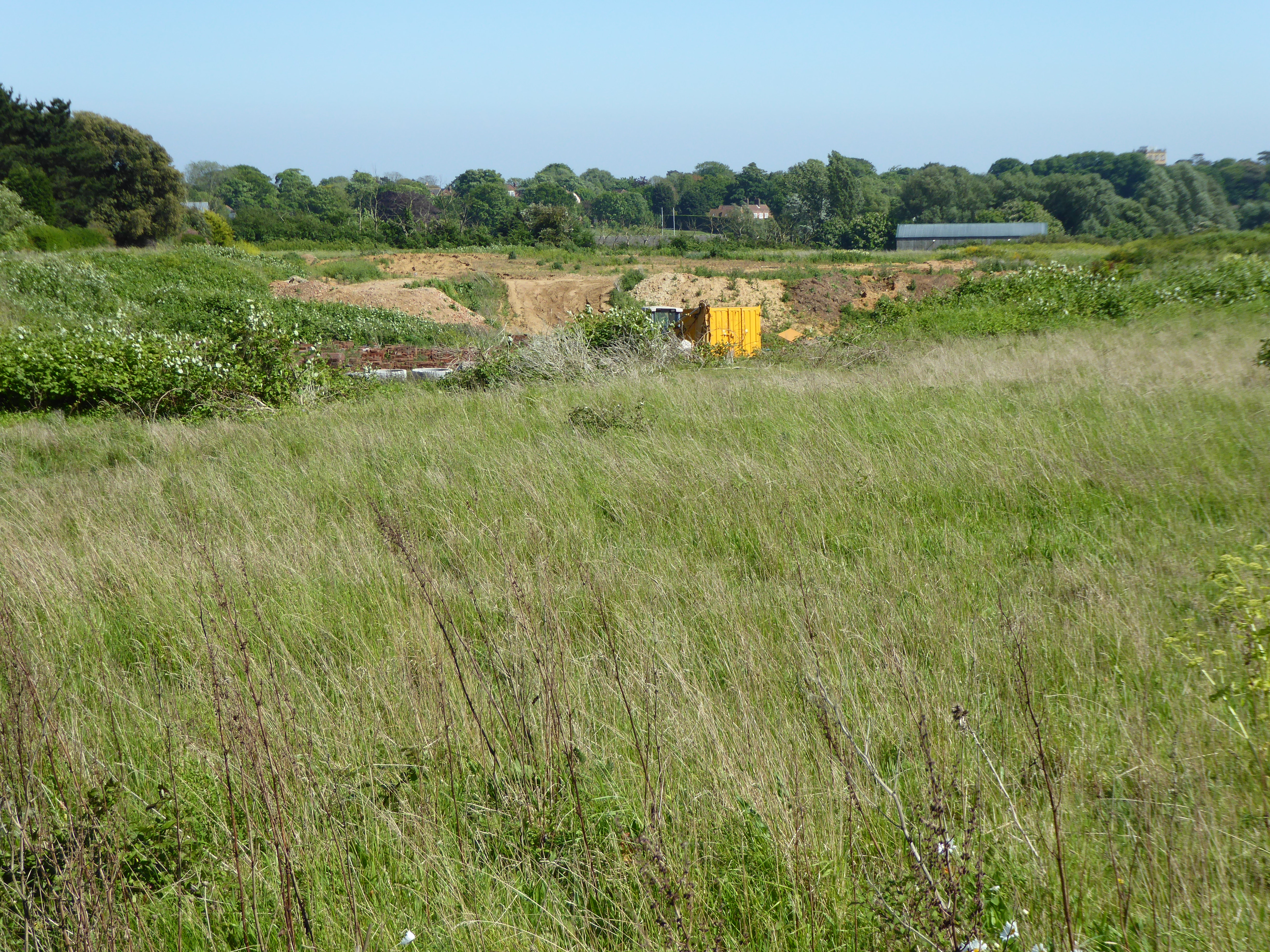
- Location of Aldeburgh Brick Pit.
- Area of search: Suffolk
- Grid reference: TM 452 572
- Interest: Geological
- Area: 0.9 hectares
- Notification date: 1990
- Location map: Magic Map

Aldeburgh Brick Pit is a 0.9-hectare (2.2-acre) geological Site of Special Scientific Interest in Aldeburgh in Suffolk. It is a Geological Conservation Review site, and it is in the Suffolk Coast and Heaths Area of Outstanding Natural Beauty.

This site has a sequence of deposits dating to the Pleistocene, and it is one of the few to have deposits dating to the Bramertonian Stage, around two million years ago. It has been fundamental to two studies of the early Pleistocene in the area.

The site is private land with no public access.
