= Round Hill Pit, Aldeburgh =

Protected area in Aldeburgh, England

Coordinates: 52.16°N 1.572°E

- Site of Special Scientific Interest
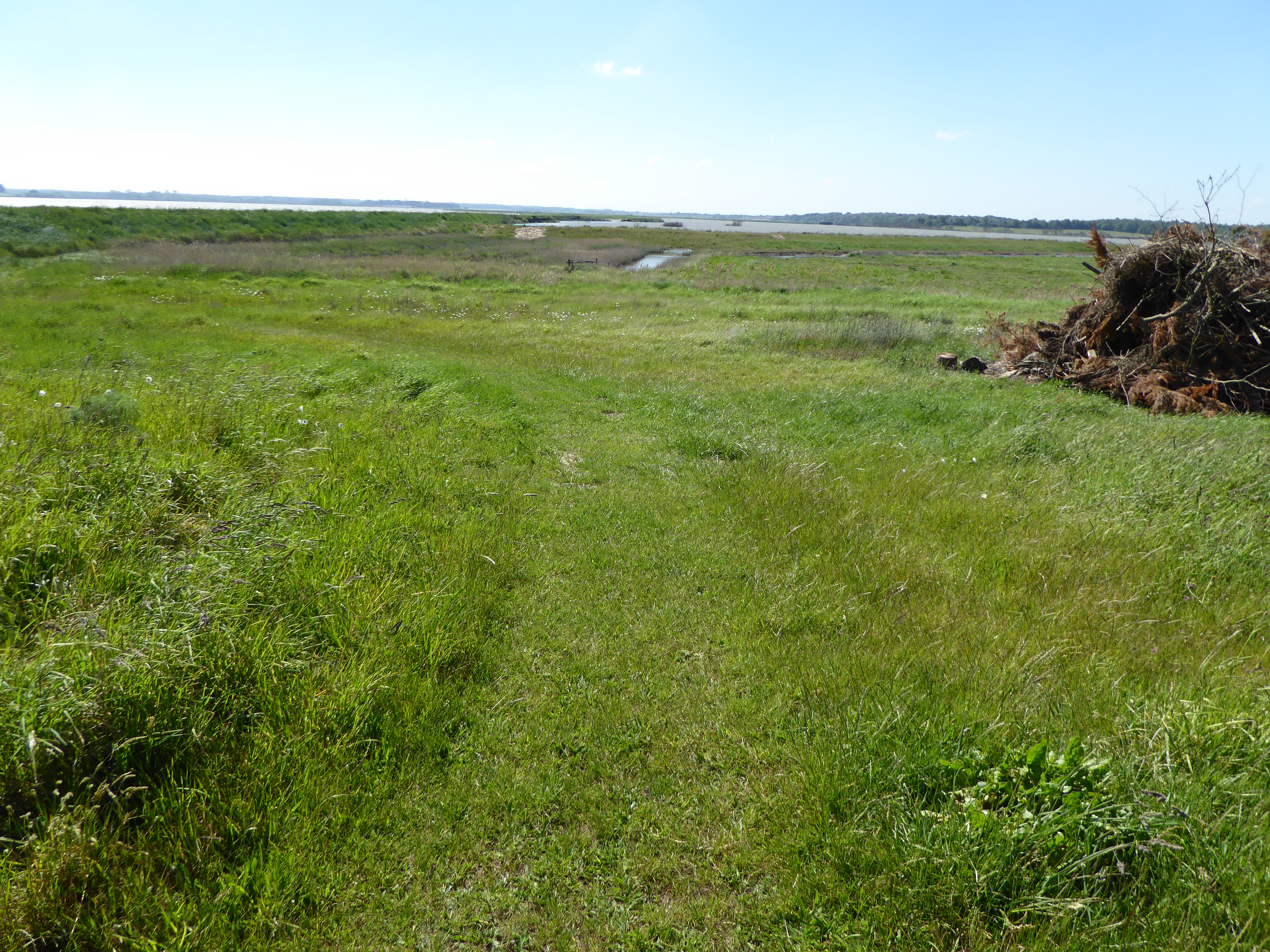
- Location of Round Hill Pit, Aldeburgh.
- Area of search: Suffolk
- Grid reference: TM 444 573
- Interest: Geological
- Area: 0.5 hectares
- Notification date: 1987
- Location map: Magic Map

Round Hill Pit, Aldeburgh is a 0.5-hectare (1.2-acre) geological Site of Special Scientific Interest in Aldeburgh in Suffolk. It is a Geological Conservation Review site, and it is in the Suffolk Coast and Heaths Area of Outstanding Natural Beauty.

This site has a 2.5 metre exposure of rocks dating to the Coralline Crag Formation of the early Pliocene, around five million years ago. It has many horizontal burrows, and is unusual because it has fossils in aragonite, which rarely survive because this mineral is soluble in water.

The site is on private land with no public access.
