= Buckanay Farm Pit, Alderton =

Protected area in Suffolk, England

Coordinates: 52.03°N 1.433°E

- Site of Special Scientific Interest
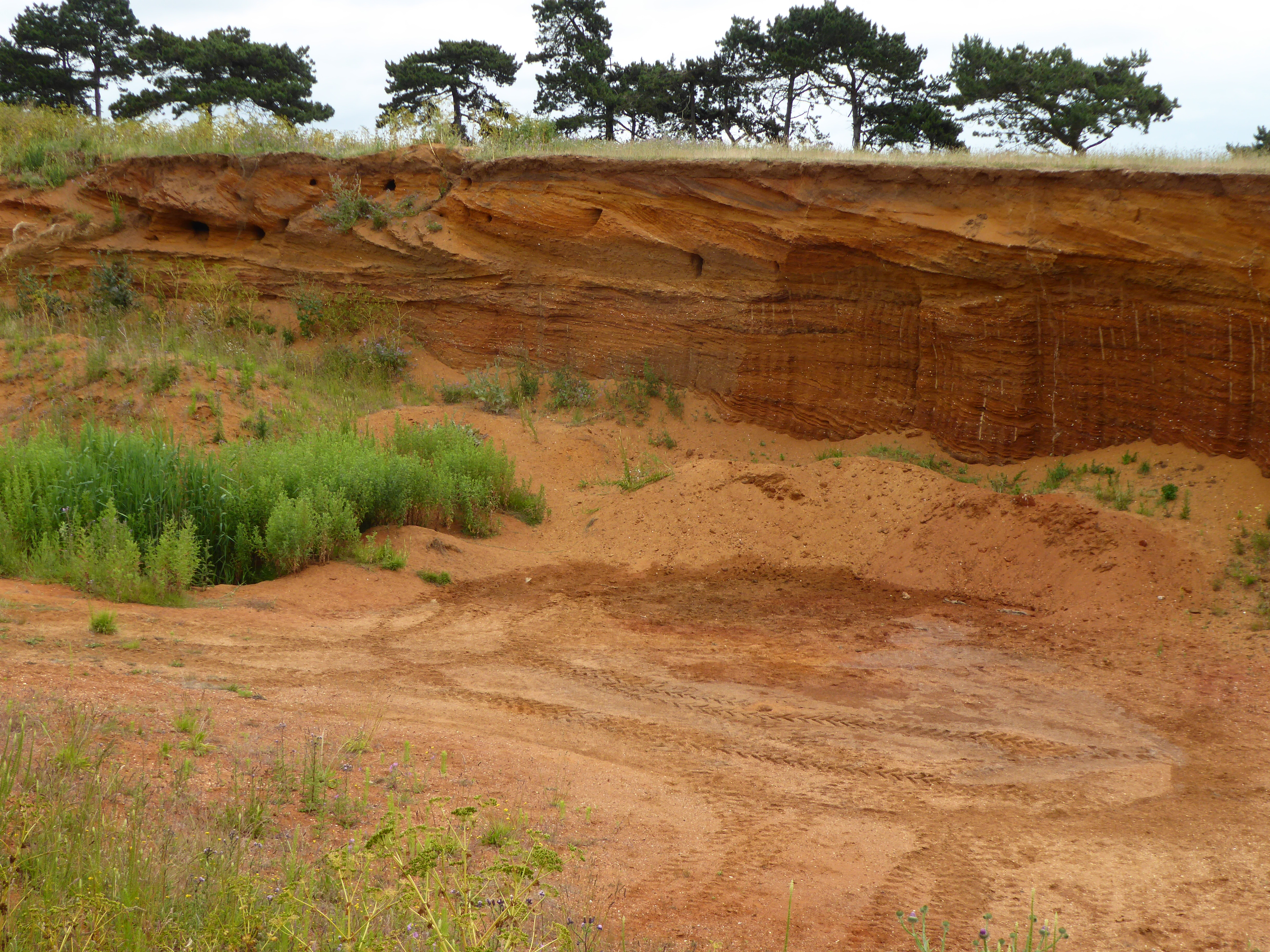
- Location of Buckanay Farm Pit, Alderton.
- Area of search: Suffolk
- Grid reference: TM 356 424
- Interest: Geological
- Area: 0.7 hectares
- Notification date: 1988
- Location map: Magic Map

Buckanay Farm Pit, Alderton is a 0.7-hectare (1.7-acre) geological Site of Special Scientific Interest east of Alderton in Suffolk. It is a Geological Conservation Review site.

This fossiliferous site exposes rocks of the marine Red Crag Formation, with a megaripple sequence showing the gradual reduction in depth of the sea. The Red Crag spans the end of the Pliocene around 2.6 million years ago and the start of the succeeding Pleistocene.

There is access to the site from Buckanay Lane.
