= Fakenham Wood and Sapiston Great Grove =

UK Site of Special Scientific Interest

Coordinates: 52.36°N 0.83°E

- Site of Special Scientific Interest
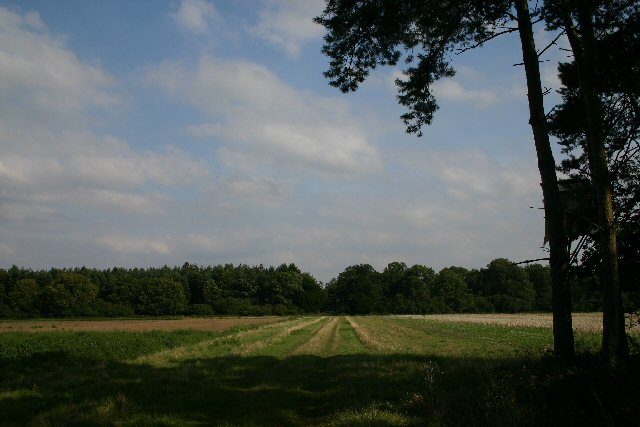
- Fakenham Wood
- Location of Fakenham Wood and Sapiston Great Grove.
- Area of search: Suffolk
- Grid reference: TL 928 773
- Interest: Biological
- Area: 200.7 hectares
- Notification date: 1986
- Location map: Magic Map

Fakenham Wood and Sapiston Great Grove is a 200.7-hectare (496-acre) biological Site of Special Scientific Interest north of Sapiston in Suffolk.

These two coppice with standards woods comprise one of the largest areas of ancient woodland in the county. The ground flora is dominated by bracken and bramble, but there are also rides which provide habitats for butterflies, including the largest colony of white admirals in Suffolk.

The woods are private property with no public access, though a public byway runs alongside the woods.
