= Stallode Wash, Lakenheath =

Protected area in Suffolk, England

Coordinates: 52.44°N 0.463°E

- Site of Special Scientific Interest
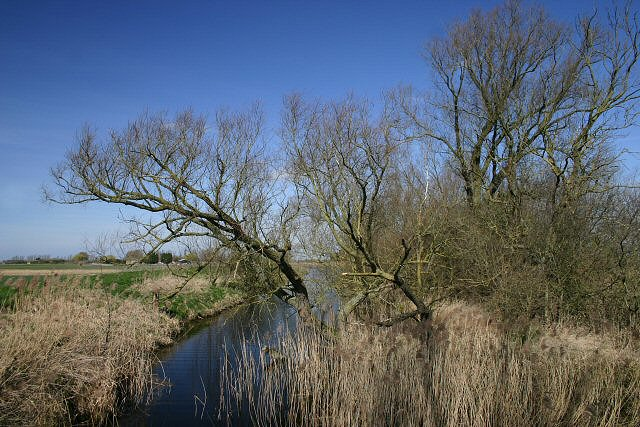
- Location of Stallode Wash, Lakenheath.
- Area of search: Suffolk
- Grid reference: TL 675 853
- Interest: Biological
- Area: 34.1 hectares
- Notification date: 1983
- Location map: Magic Map

Stallode Wash, Lakenheath is a 34.1-hectare (84-acre) biological Site of Special Scientific Interest north-west of Lakenheath in Suffolk.

This is grassland, fen and reedswamp, which is seasonally flooded by the River Little Ouse, and there are smaller areas of permanent open water. There are two nationally rare plants, water germander and marsh pea.
