= Bobbitshole, Belstead =

Protected area in Suffolk, England

Coordinates: 52.029°N 1.131°E

- Site of Special Scientific Interest
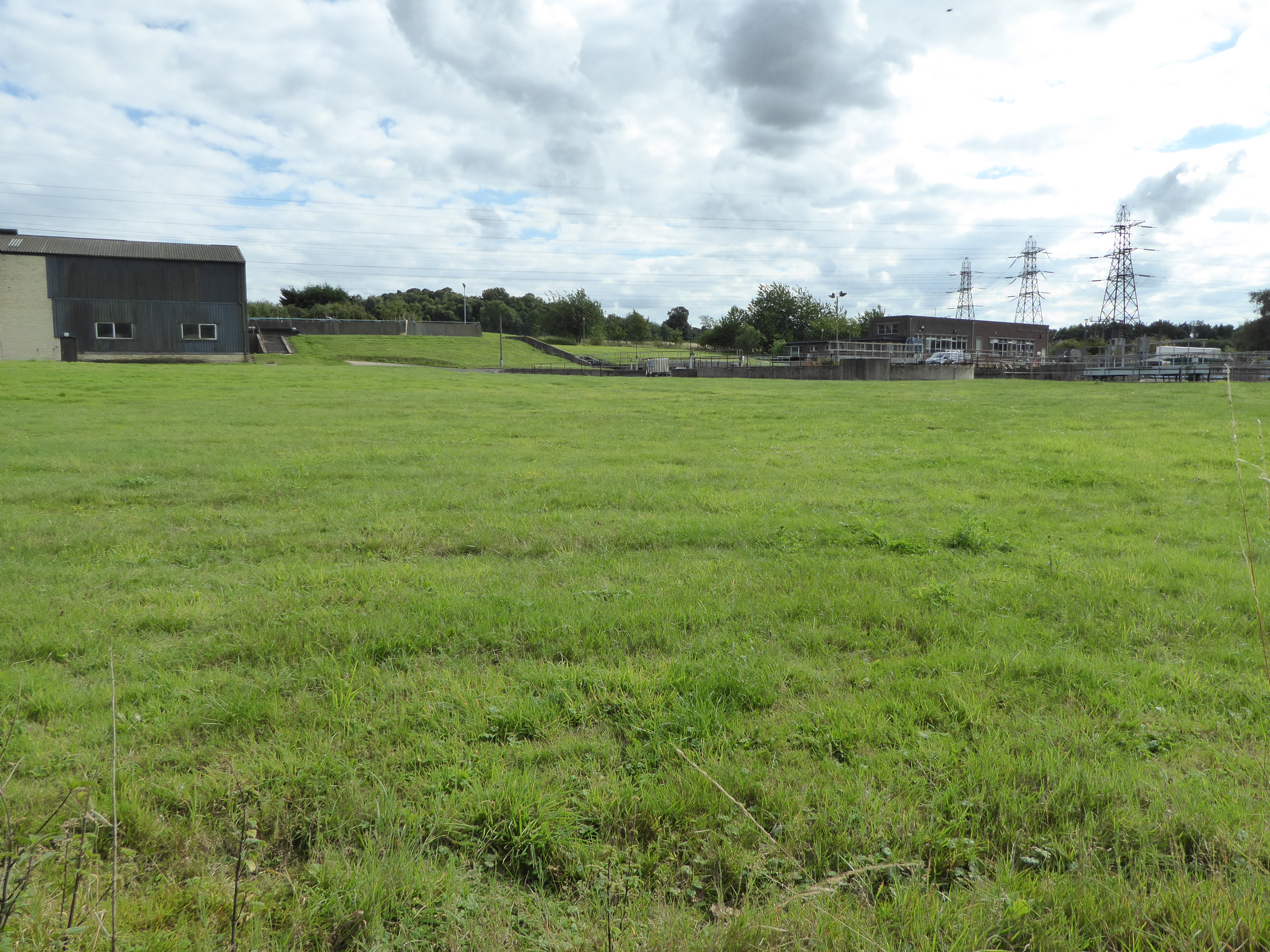
- Location of Bobbitshole, Belstead.
- Area of search: Suffolk
- Grid reference: TM 149 414
- Interest: Geological
- Area: 1.7 hectares
- Notification date: 1987
- Location map: Magic Map

Bobbitshole is a 1.7-hectare (4.2-acre) geological Site of Special Scientific Interest in Belstead, on the southern outskirts of Ipswich in Suffolk. It is a Geological Conservation Review site.

This is the type locality for the warm Ipswichian interglacial around 130,000 to 115,000 year ago. It has yielded continuous deposits from the end of the preceding Wolstonian cold stage to the end of the Ipswichian. It is described by Natural England as a "nationally important Pleistocene reference site".

This site is private land with no public access. It has been filled in and no geology is visible.
