= Aldeburgh Hall Pit =

Protected area in Aldeburgh, England

Coordinates: 52.153°N 1.583°E

- Site of Special Scientific Interest
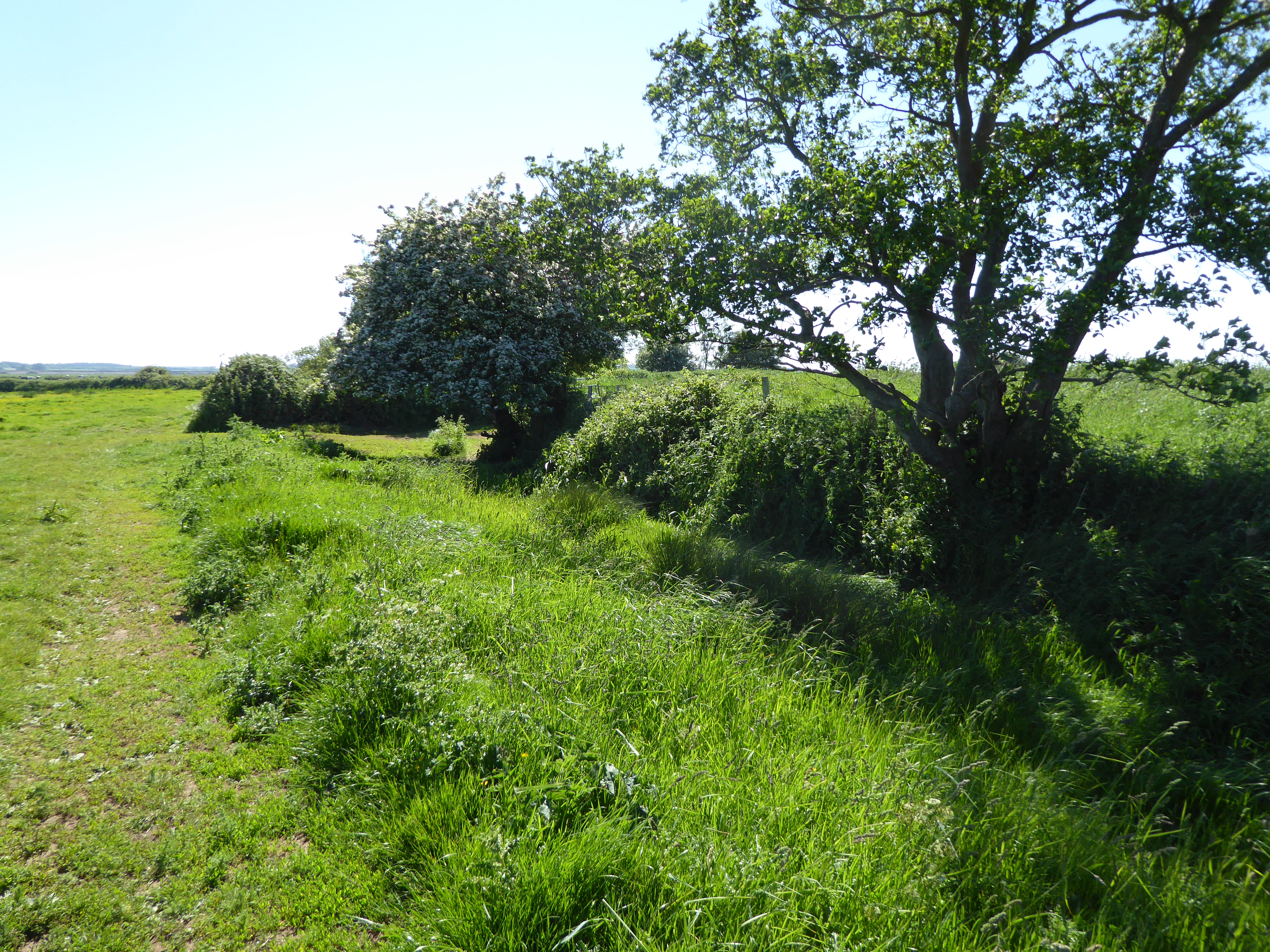
- Location of Aldeburgh Hall Pit.
- Area of search: Suffolk
- Grid reference: TM 452 566
- Interest: Geological
- Area: 1.0 hectares
- Notification date: 1986
- Location map: Magic Map

Aldeburgh Hall Pit is a one hectare geological Site of Special Scientific Interest in Aldeburgh in Suffolk. It is a Geological Conservation Review site, and it is in the Suffolk Coast and Heaths Area of Outstanding Natural Beauty.

This site has very fossiliferous rocks of the early Pliocene Coralline Crag Formation around five million years ago. The Bryozoan fauna are rich and diverse, and the stratification may indicate the interior of an offshore sandbank.

The site is private land with no public access.
