= Pashford Poor's Fen, Lakenheath =

Biological site in Suffolk

Coordinates: 52.423°N 0.546°E

- Site of Special Scientific Interest
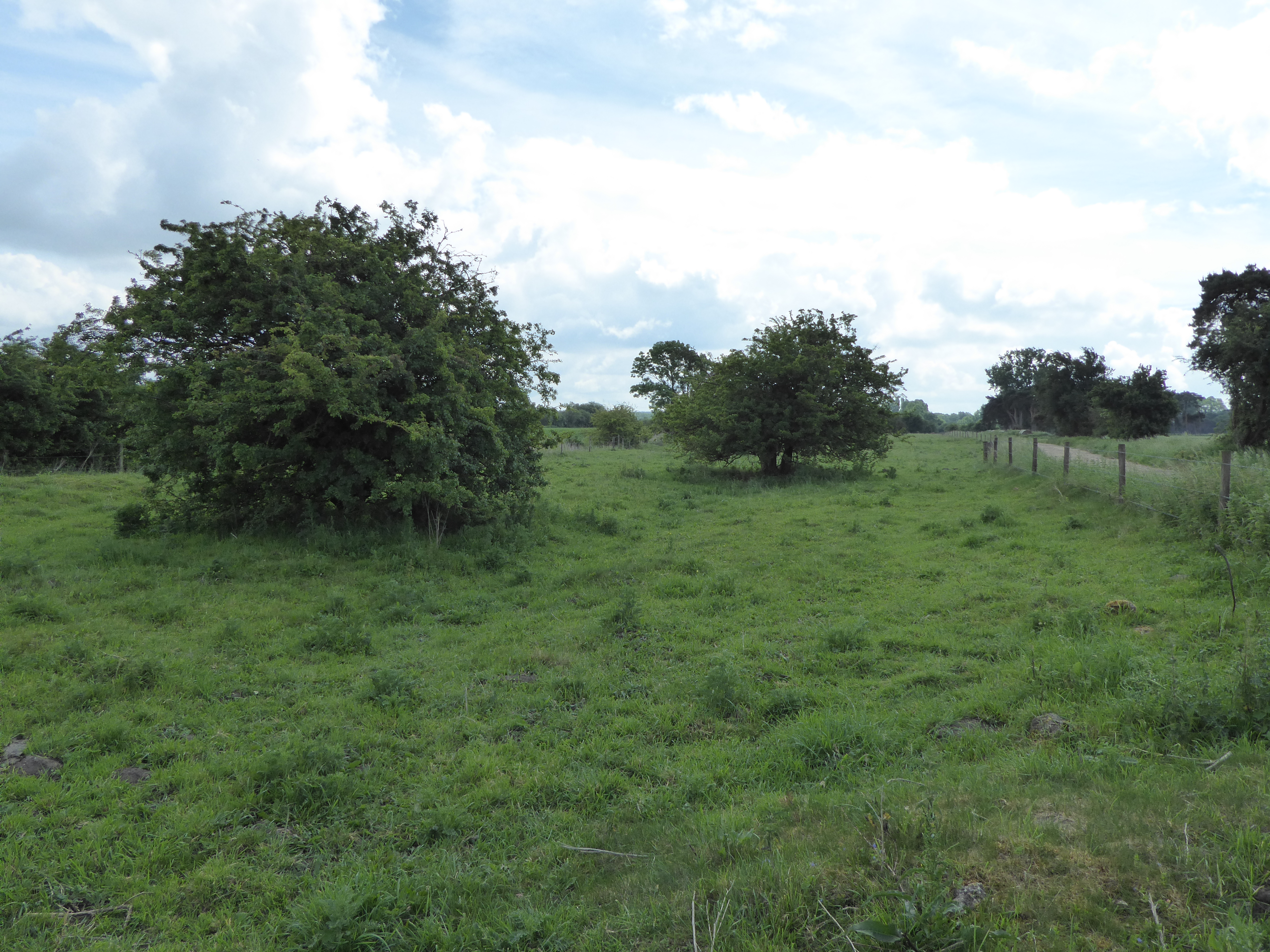
- Location of Pashford Poor's Fen, Lakenheath.
- Area of search: Suffolk
- Grid reference: TL 732 836
- Interest: Biological
- Area: 12.4 hectares
- Notification date: 1995
- Location map: Magic Map

Pashford Poor's Fen, Lakenheath is a 12.4-hectare (31-acre) biological Site of Special Scientific Interest east of Lakenheath in Suffolk.

This diverse site has species rich meadow, hollows with fen and marshes, birch woodland, scrub and reed beds. The invertebrate fauna is diverse, and includes the last known British site for a beetle listed on the Red Data Book of Threatened Species.

The site is private land with no public access.
