= Hascot Hill Pit =

Protected area in Suffolk, England

Coordinates: 52.143°N 1.009°E

- Site of Special Scientific Interest
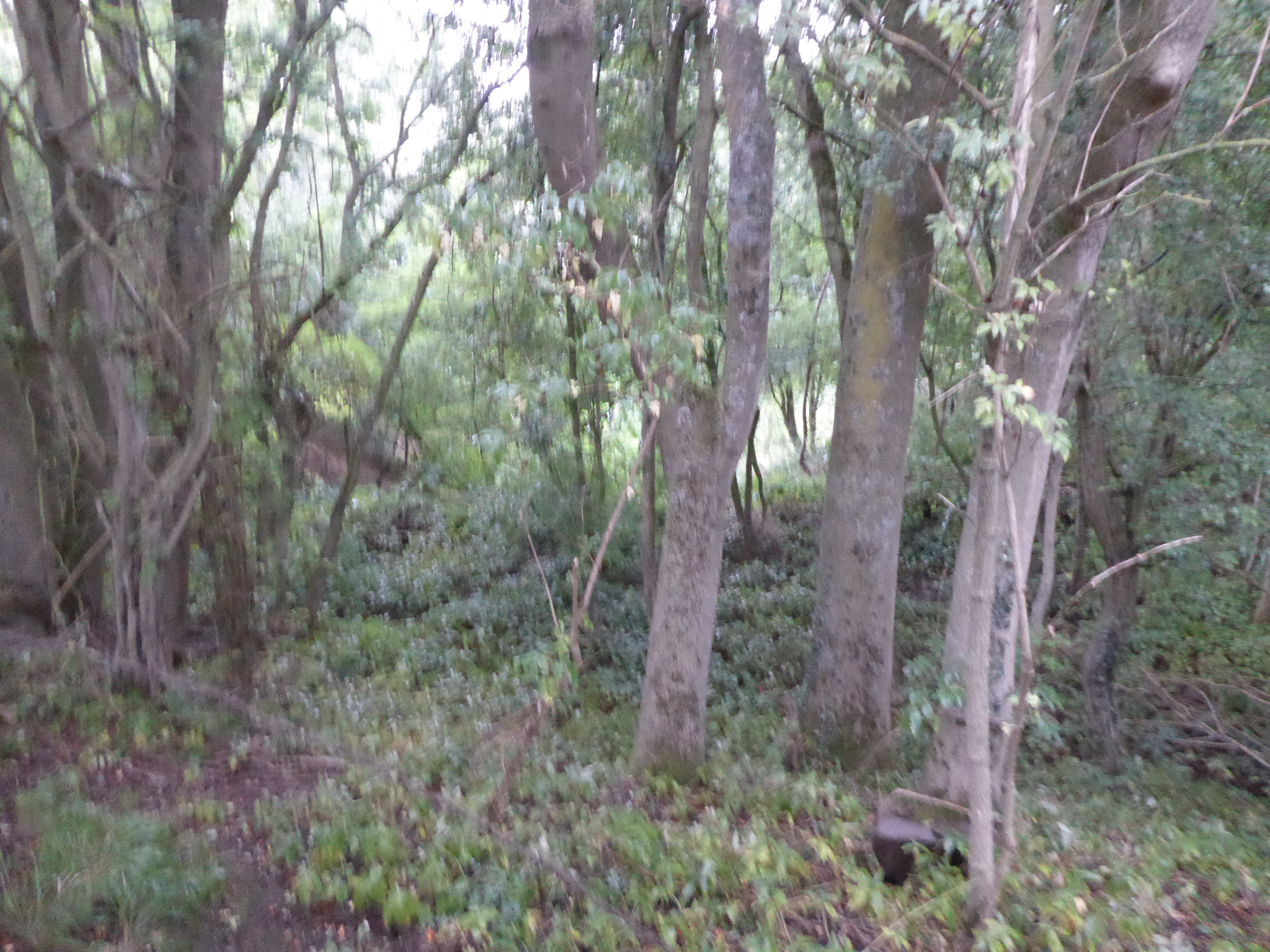
- Location of Hascot Hill Pit.
- Area of search: Suffolk
- Grid reference: TM 060 537
- Interest: Geological
- Area: 0.3 hectares
- Notification date: 1987
- Location map: Magic Map

Hascot Hill Pit is a 0.3-hectare (0.74-acre) geological Site of Special Scientific Interest south-west of Needham Market in Suffolk. It is a Geological Conservation Review site. It is also a Local Wildlife Site.

This is the only known site to expose beach deposits of the late Pliocene and early Pleistocene Red Crag Formation. It has beach cobbles and fossils from a littoral fauna, whereas other Red Crag sites have deposits from deeper water facies.

The site is private land with no public access.
