= Horringer Court Caves =

Protected area in Suffolk, England

- Site of Special Scientific Interest
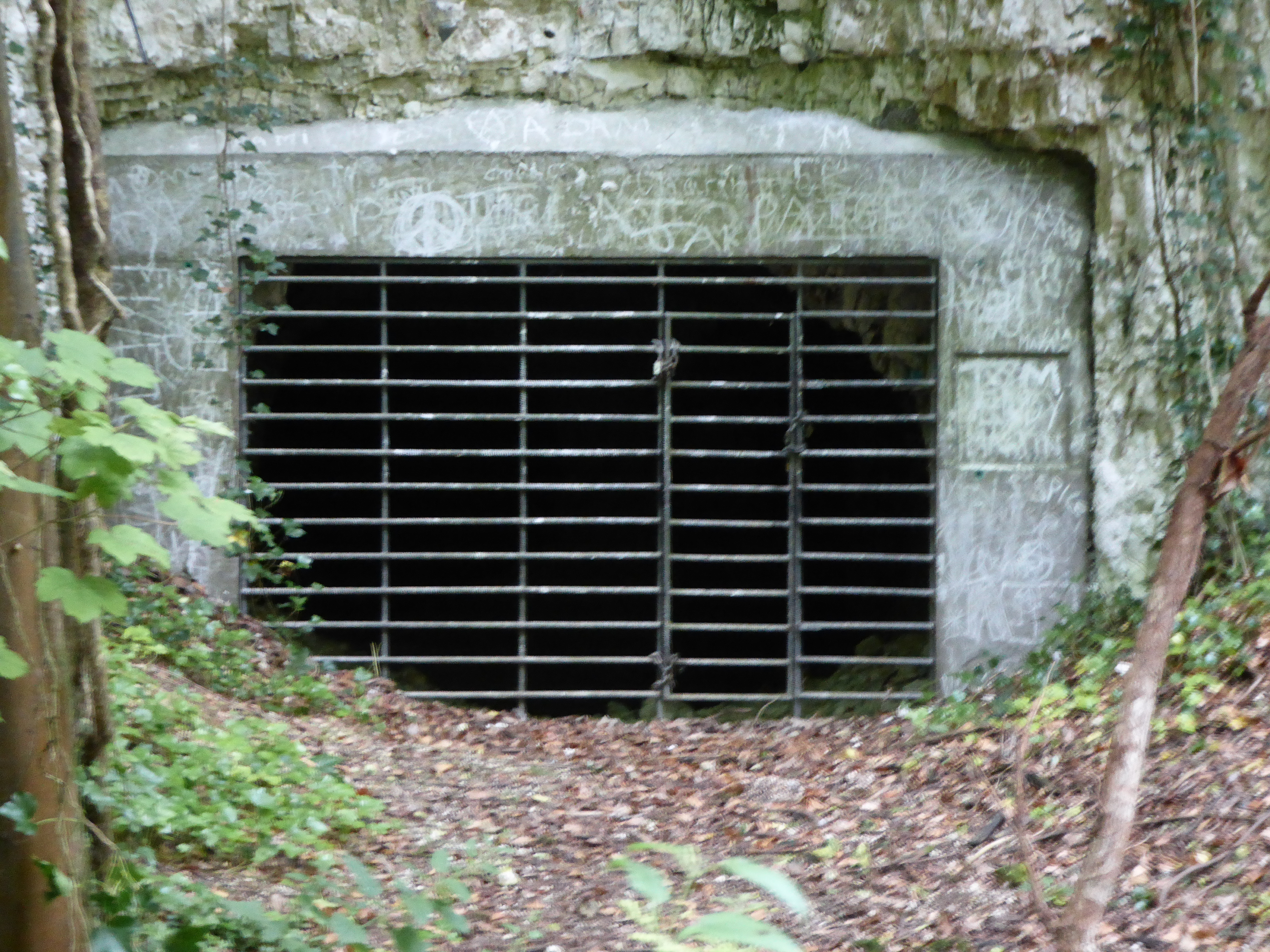
- Horringer Court Caves

- Location within Suffolk
- Location of Horringer Court Caves.
- Area of search: Suffolk
- Grid reference: TL 836 628
- Coordinates: 52.233°N 0.687°E
- Interest: Biological
- Area: 3.8 hectares (0.03800 km^{2}; 0.01467 sq mi)
- Notification date: 1983

Horringer Court Caves is a 3.8-hectare (9.4-acre) biological Site of Special Scientific Interest on the southern outskirts of Bury St Edmunds in Suffolk.

This site has over 500 m (1,600 ft) of chalk mines, with five grilled entrances, which are used by bats for hibernation. They have been the subject of research since 1947. The main bats using the caves are Daubenton's, but other species include the very rare barbastelle, which have been recorded eight times in 36 years.

This site in the grounds of a hotel is private property.
