= Potton Hall Fields, Westleton =

Conservation site in England

Coordinates: 52.278°N 1.599°E

- Site of Special Scientific Interest
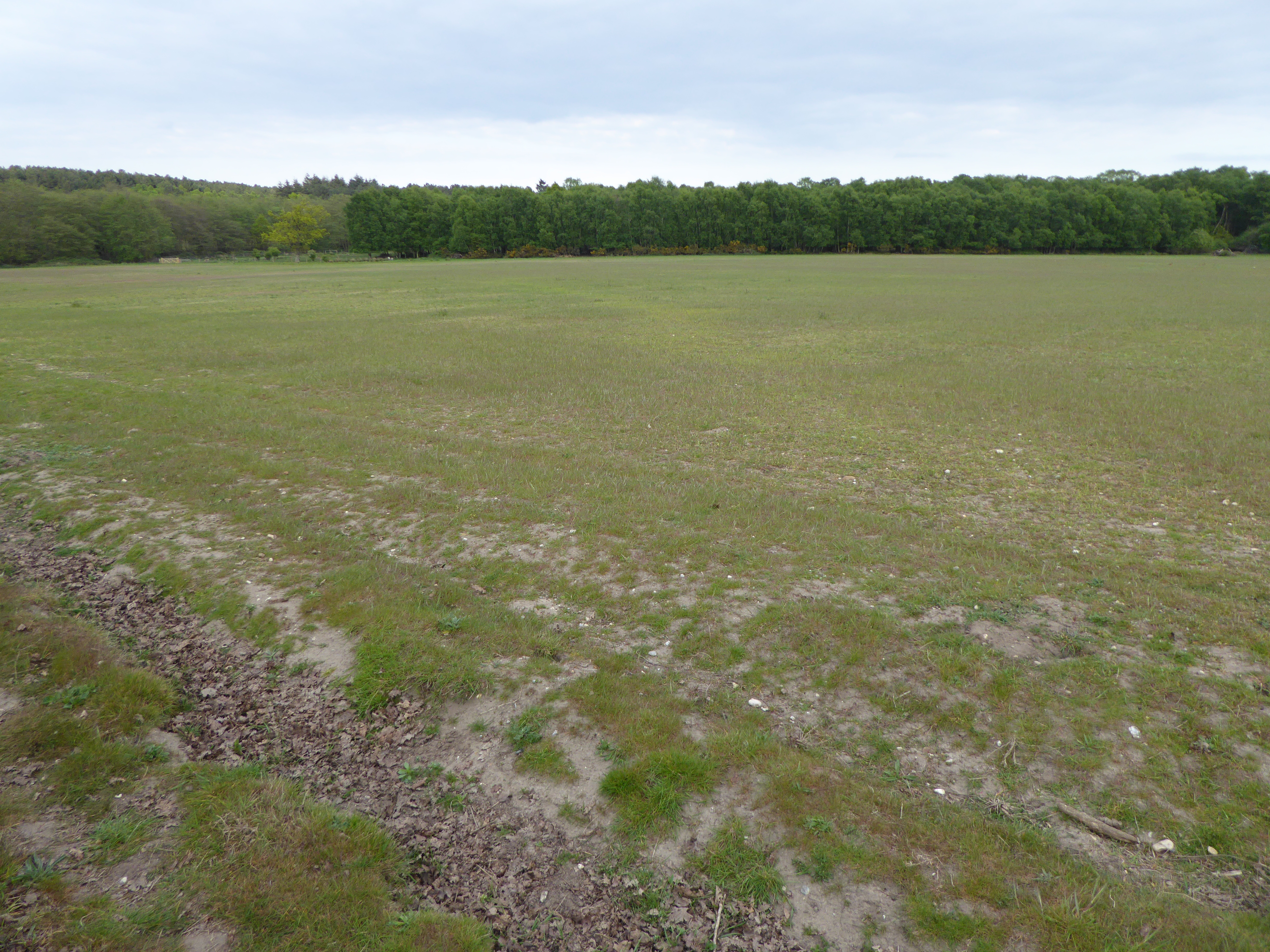
- Location of Potton Hall Fields, Westleton.
- Area of search: Suffolk
- Grid reference: TM 456 705
- Interest: Biological
- Area: 16.7 hectares
- Notification date: 1992
- Location map: Magic Map

Potton Hall Fields, Westleton is a 16.7-hectare (41-acre) biological Site of Special Scientific Interest (SSSI) west of Dunwich in Suffolk. It is in the Suffolk Coast and Heaths Area of Outstanding Natural Beauty.

This site comprises two gently sloping fields on sandy, well drained soil. It has been designated an SSSI because it has a population of several thousand plants of the nationally rare red-tipped cudweed in large patches throughout the site. The plant is only found in two other counties in Britain.

There is no public access to the site but it can be viewed from Sandlings Walk.
