= Crag Pit, Aldeburgh =

Protected area in Suffolk, England

Coordinates: 52.165°N 1.593°E

- Site of Special Scientific Interest
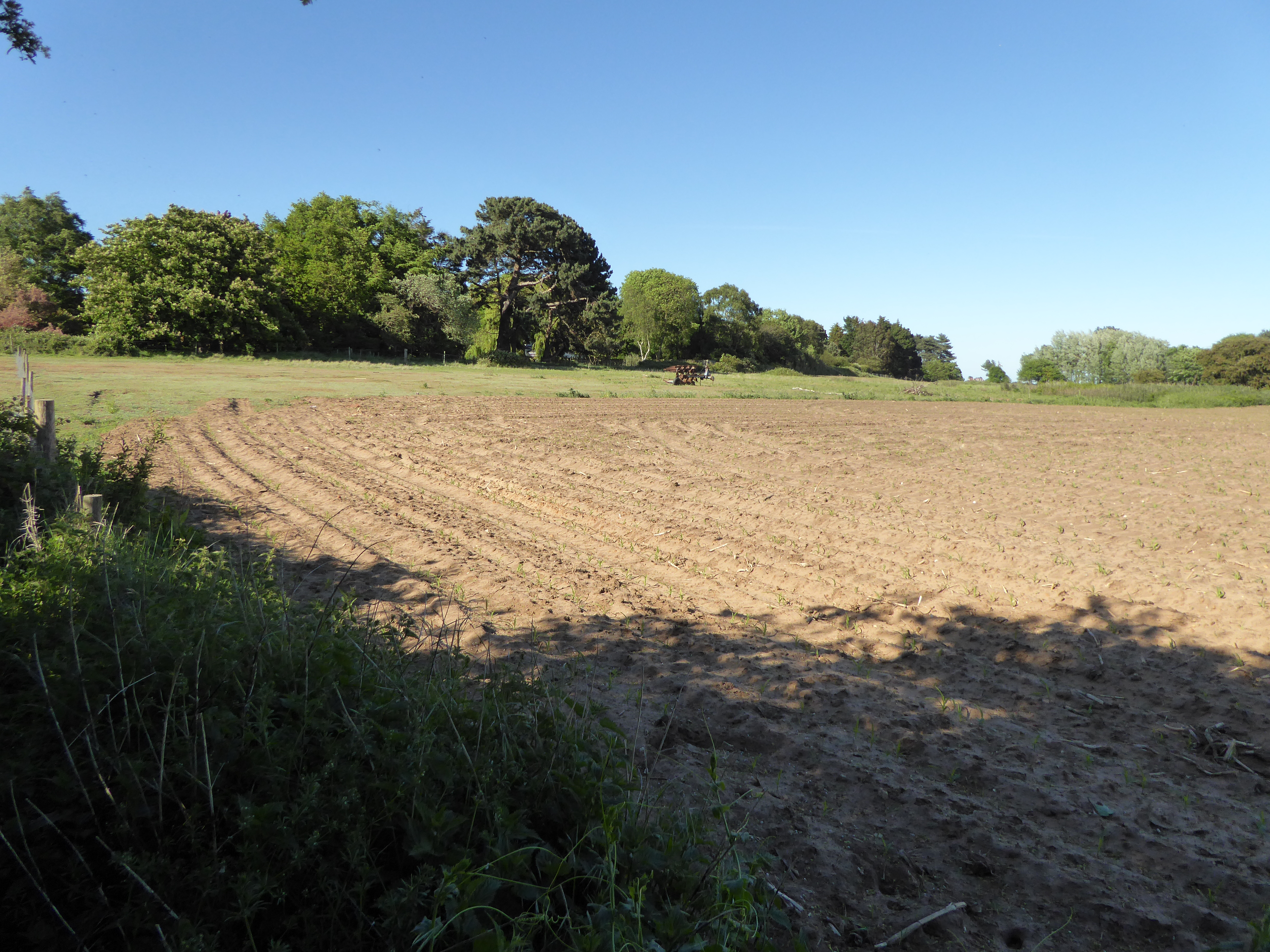
- Location of Crag Pit, Aldeburgh.
- Area of search: Suffolk
- Grid reference: TM 458 580
- Interest: Geological
- Area: 0.2 hectares
- Notification date: 1987
- Location map: Magic Map

Crag Pit, Aldeburgh is a 0.2-hectare (0.49-acre) geological Site of Special Scientific Interest in Aldeburgh in Suffolk. It is a Geological Conservation Review site, and within the Suffolk Coast and Heaths Area of Outstanding Natural Beauty.

This is the most northern site which exposes the Pliocene Coralline Crag Formation dated to around five million years old. It has numerous and diverse fossils, including many bryozoans, and other fauna include serpulids and several boring forms.

This site, which has been filled in, is on private land with no public access.
