= The Glen Chalk Caves, Bury St Edmunds =

Suffolk Biological Site

Coordinates: 52.248°N 0.729°E

- Site of Special Scientific Interest
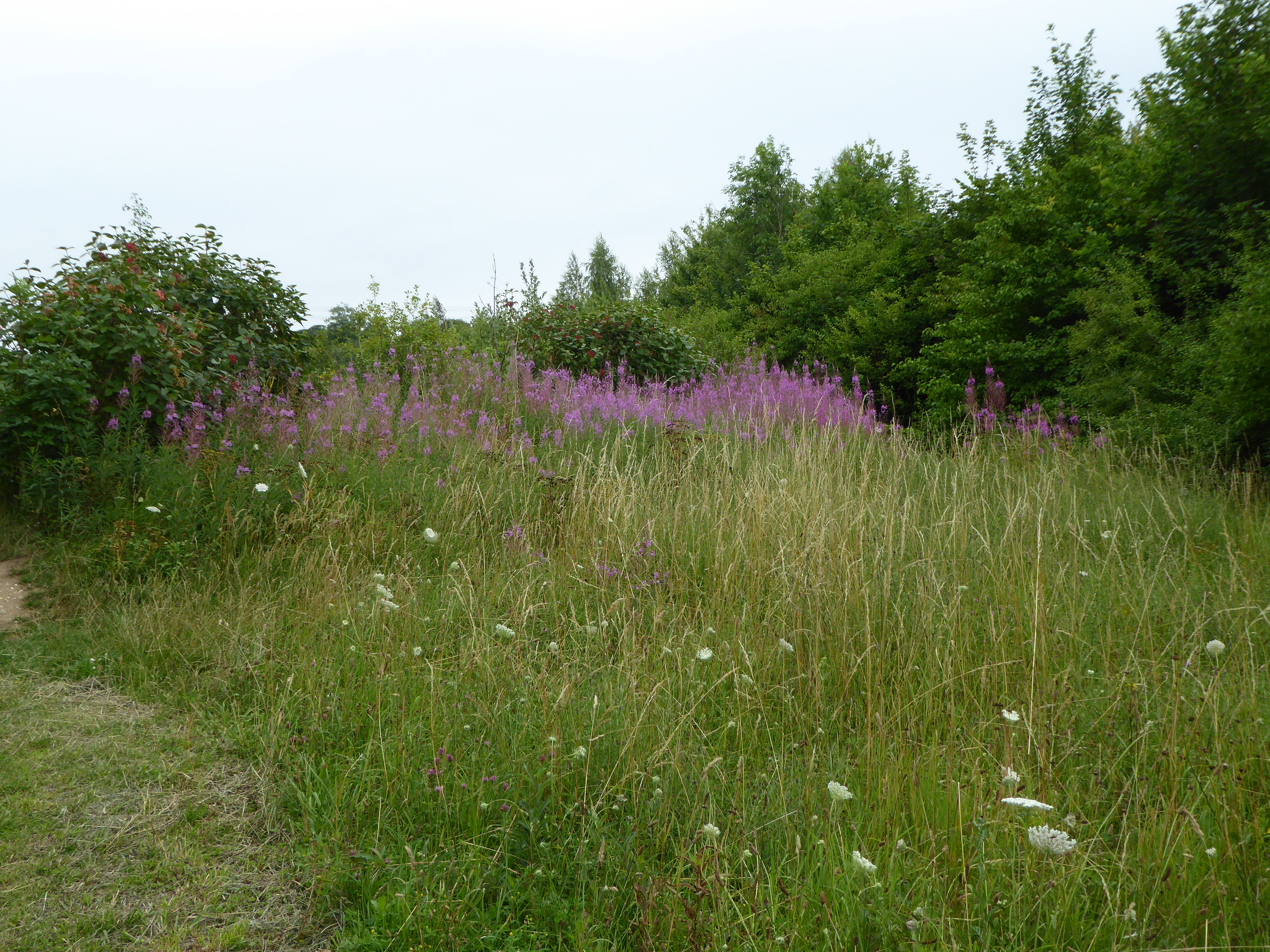
- Location of The Glen Chalk Caves, Bury St Edmunds.
- Area of search: Suffolk
- Grid reference: TL 864 646
- Interest: Biological
- Area: 1.6 hectares
- Notification date: 1986
- Location map: Magic Map

The Glen Chalk Caves, Bury St Edmunds is a 1.6-hectare (4.0-acre) biological Site of Special Scientific Interest in Bury St Edmunds in Suffolk.

Tunnels totalling 200 metres in length radiate from a chalk pit which also contains a disused lime kiln, and the tunnels and kiln are used by five species of bat for hibernation between September and April, and the surrounding vegetation helps to maintain a suitable micro-climate in the caves. The principal species are Daubenton's, Natterer's and brown long-eared bats.

The caves are in an area maintained as a nature reserve off Mount Road.
