= Holton Pit =

Protected area in Suffolk, England

Coordinates: 52.342°N 1.529°E

- Site of Special Scientific Interest
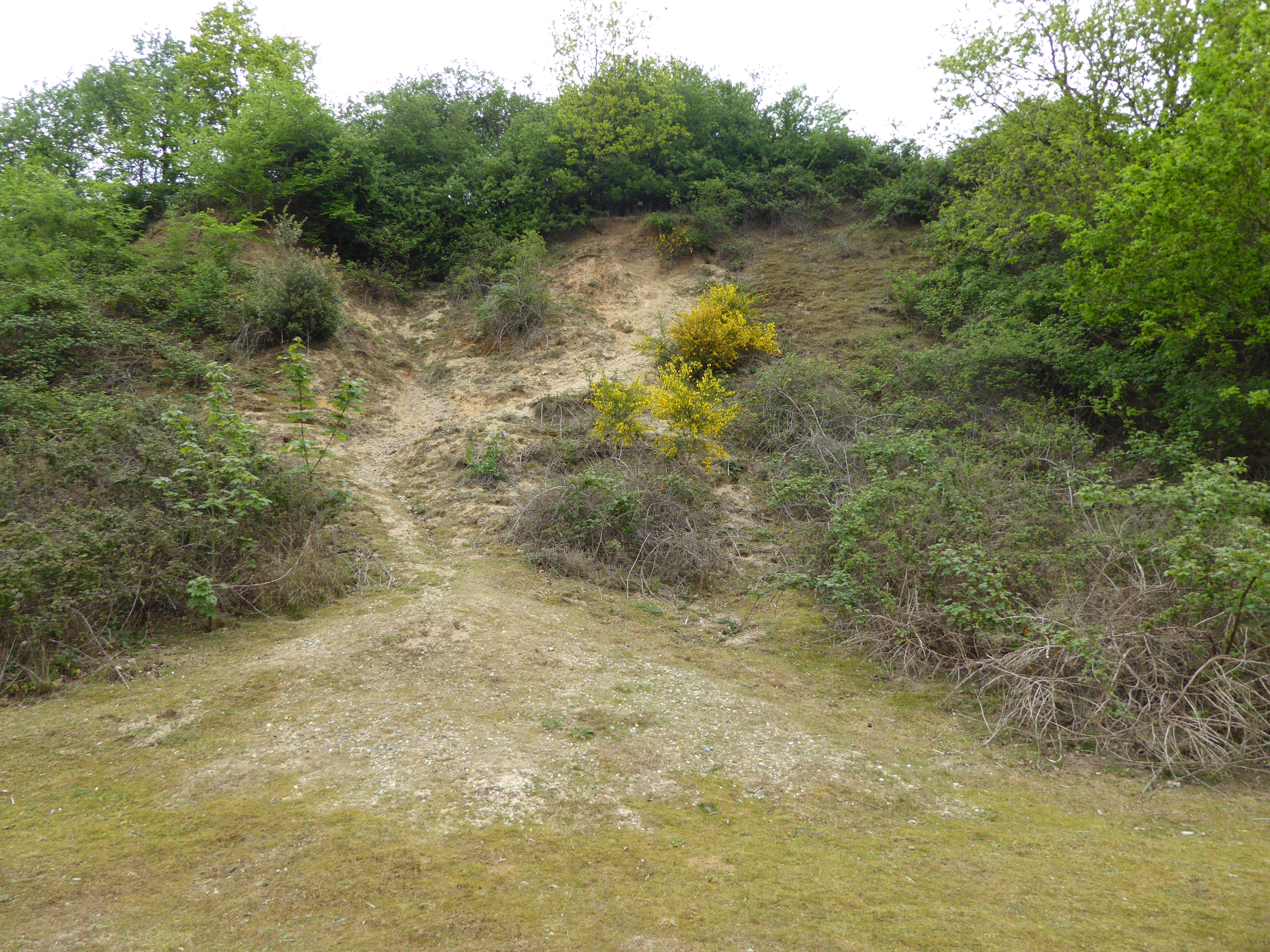
- Location of Holton Pit.
- Area of search: Suffolk
- Grid reference: TM 405 774
- Interest: Geological
- Area: 1.6 hectares
- Notification date: 1988
- Location map: Magic Map

Holton Pit is a 1.6-hectare (4.0-acre) geological Site of Special Scientific Interest east of Halesworth in Suffolk. It is a Geological Conservation Review site.

This was thought to be the only site known to show the sequence of the early Pleistocene Westleton Beds overlain by "quarttzose gravels" deposited by the proto-Thames river as the Kesgrave Sands & Gravels. The "quartzose gravels" are now thought most likely to be Anglian glacial outwash. The Westleton Beds mainly consist of sand but were quarried here for gravels that were a coastal gravel accumulation, especially gravels washed into large channels, and the site is close to their known inland boundary and throws light on their spatial limits.

Footpaths from Holton go through the site.
