= Riverside House Meadow =

Protected area in Suffolk, England

Coordinates: 52.105°N 1.275°E

- Site of Special Scientific Interest
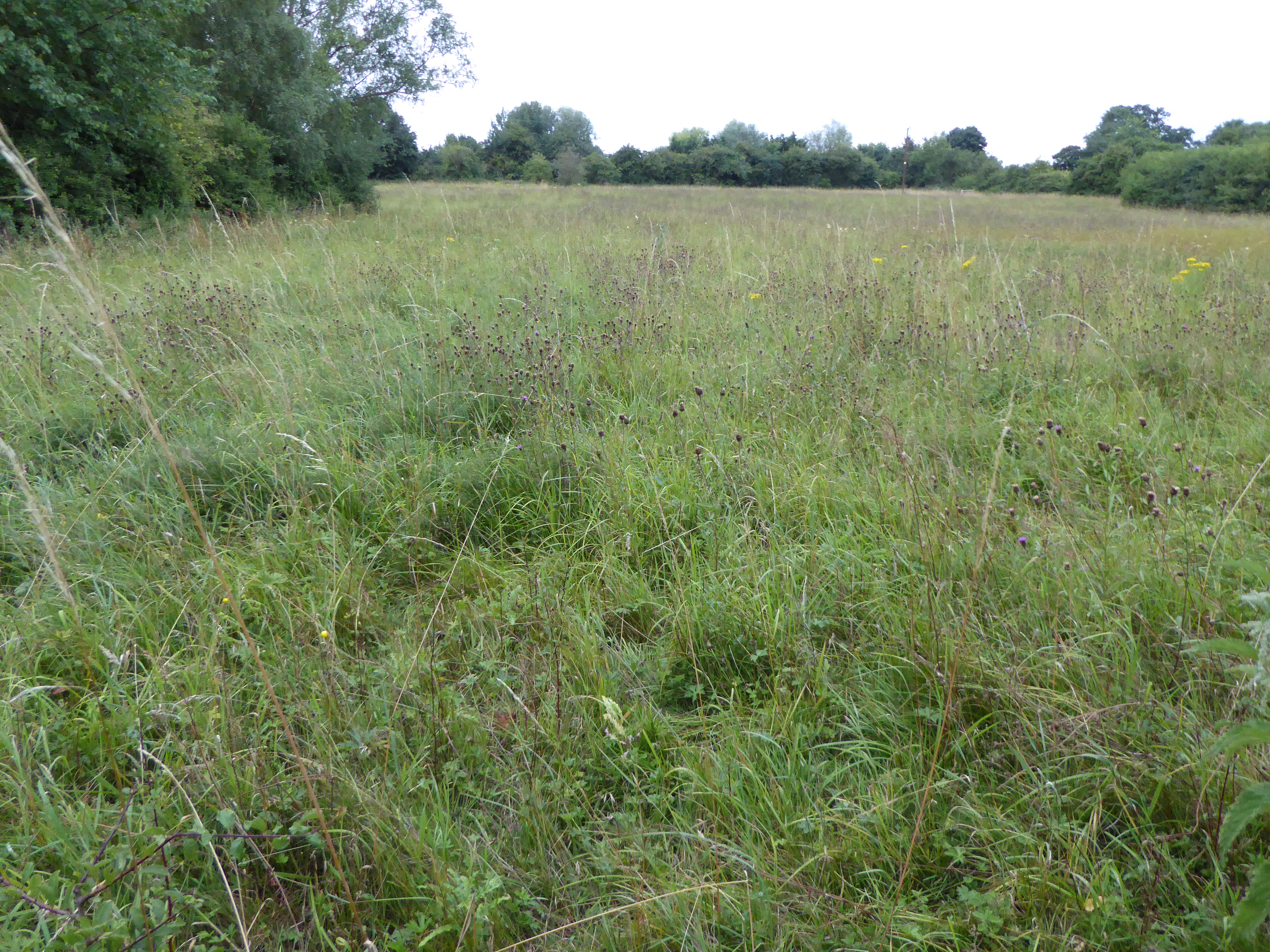
- Location of Riverside House Meadow.
- Area of search: Suffolk
- Grid reference: TM 244 503
- Interest: Biological
- Area: 1.4 hectares
- Notification date: 1993
- Location map: Magic Map

Riverside House Meadow is a 1.4-hectare (3.5-acre) biological Site of Special Scientific Interest south-west of Hasketon in Suffolk.

This unimproved grassland is traditionally managed with a hay cut in the summer, and it has diverse grasses and herbs. The number of such meadows has declined considerably due to changes in agriculture. Eleven grass species and 52 other plants have been recorded.

The site is private land with no public access.
