= London Road Industrial Estate, Brandon =

Protected area in Suffolk, England

Coordinates: 52.439°N 0.607°E

- Site of Special Scientific Interest
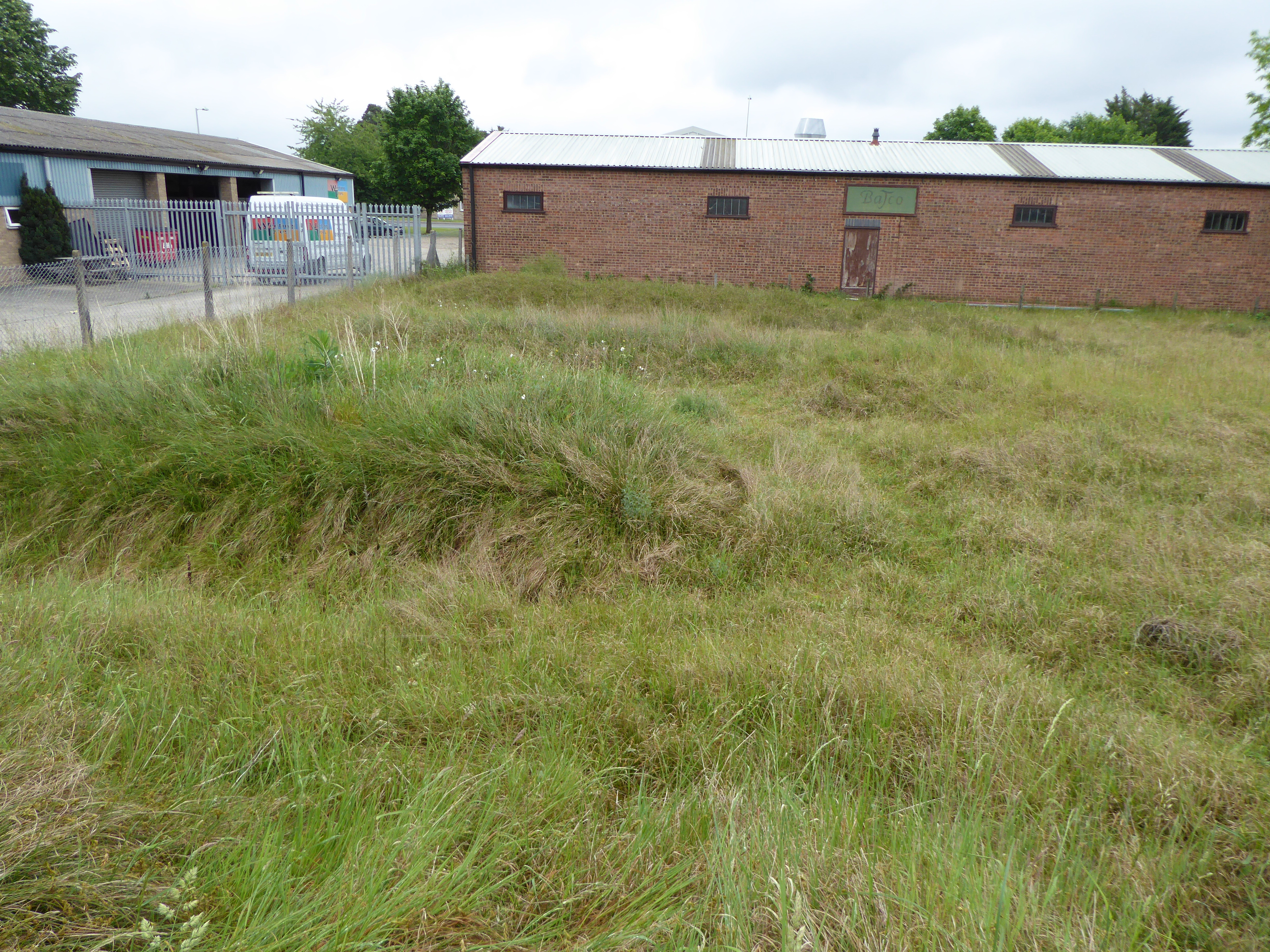
- Location of London Road Industrial Estate, Brandon.
- Area of search: Suffolk
- Grid reference: TL 773 855
- Interest: Biological
- Area: 0.1 hectares
- Notification date: 1983
- Location map: Magic Map

London Road Industrial Estate, Brandon is a 0.1-hectare (0.25-acre) biological Site of Special Scientific Interest (SSSI) in Brandon in Suffolk.

This very small meadow in the middle of an industrial estate has been designated an SSSI because it has the largest known wild population in Britain of the nationally rare Artemisia campestris, which is thought to have survived due to periodic soil disturbance.

There is access to the site by a stile.
