= Wilde Street Meadow =

Protected area in Suffolk, England

Coordinates: 52.382°N 0.511°E

- Site of Special Scientific Interest
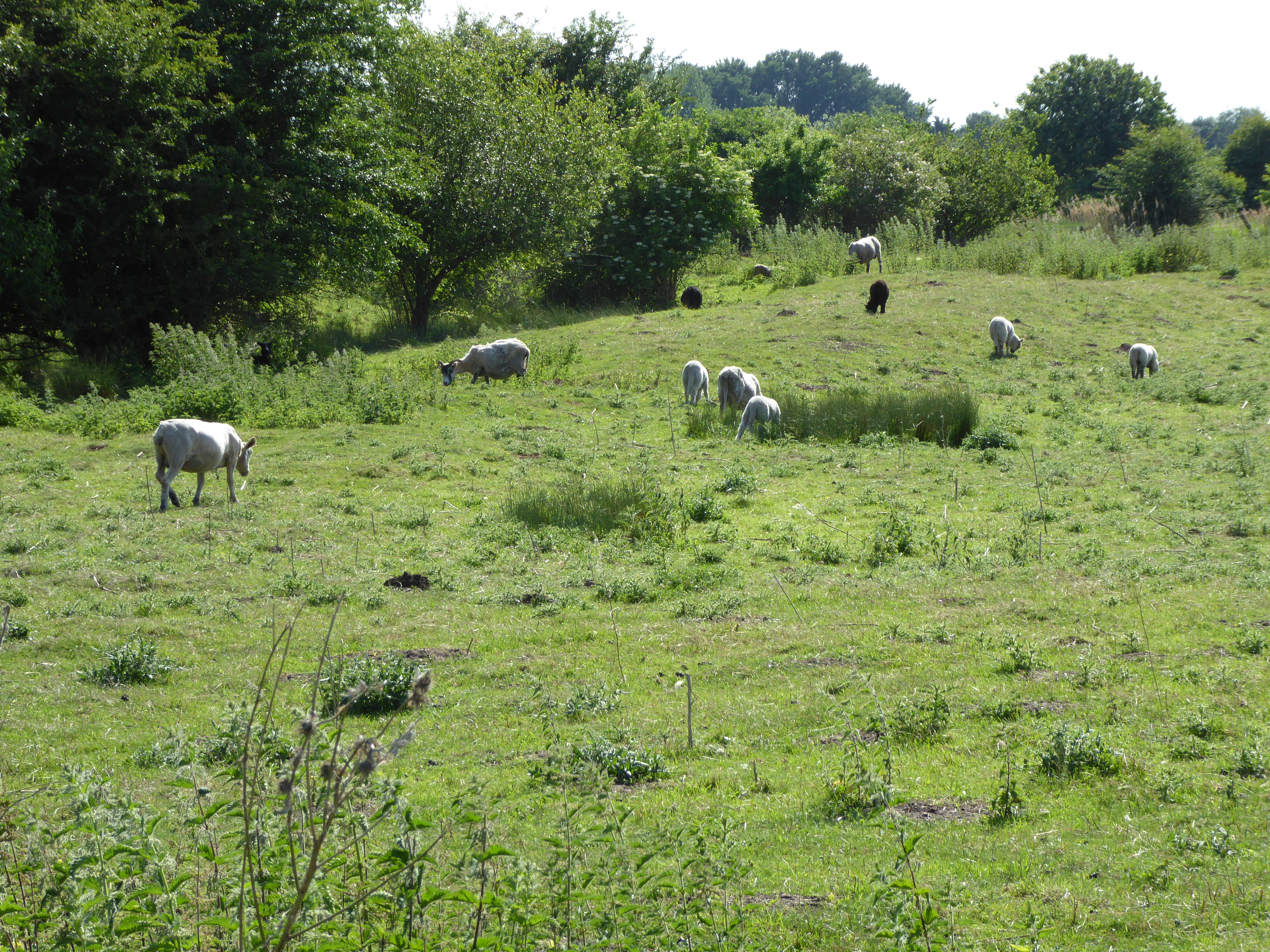
- Location of Wilde Street Meadow.
- Area of search: Suffolk
- Grid reference: TL 710 790
- Interest: Biological
- Area: 11.6 hectares
- Notification date: 1983
- Location map: Magic Map

Wilde Street Meadow is an 11.6-hectare (29-acre) biological Site of Special Scientific Interest between Lakenheath and Mildenhall in Suffolk, England.

This site has a long history of traditional management, with low intensity summer grazing. It has areas of species-rich calcareous grassland, damp pasture, scrub and dykes. There is a large population of green-winged orchids.

The site is private land with no public access.
