= Neutral Farm Pit, Butley =

Protected area in Suffolk, England

Coordinates: 52.106°N 1.461°E

- Site of Special Scientific Interest
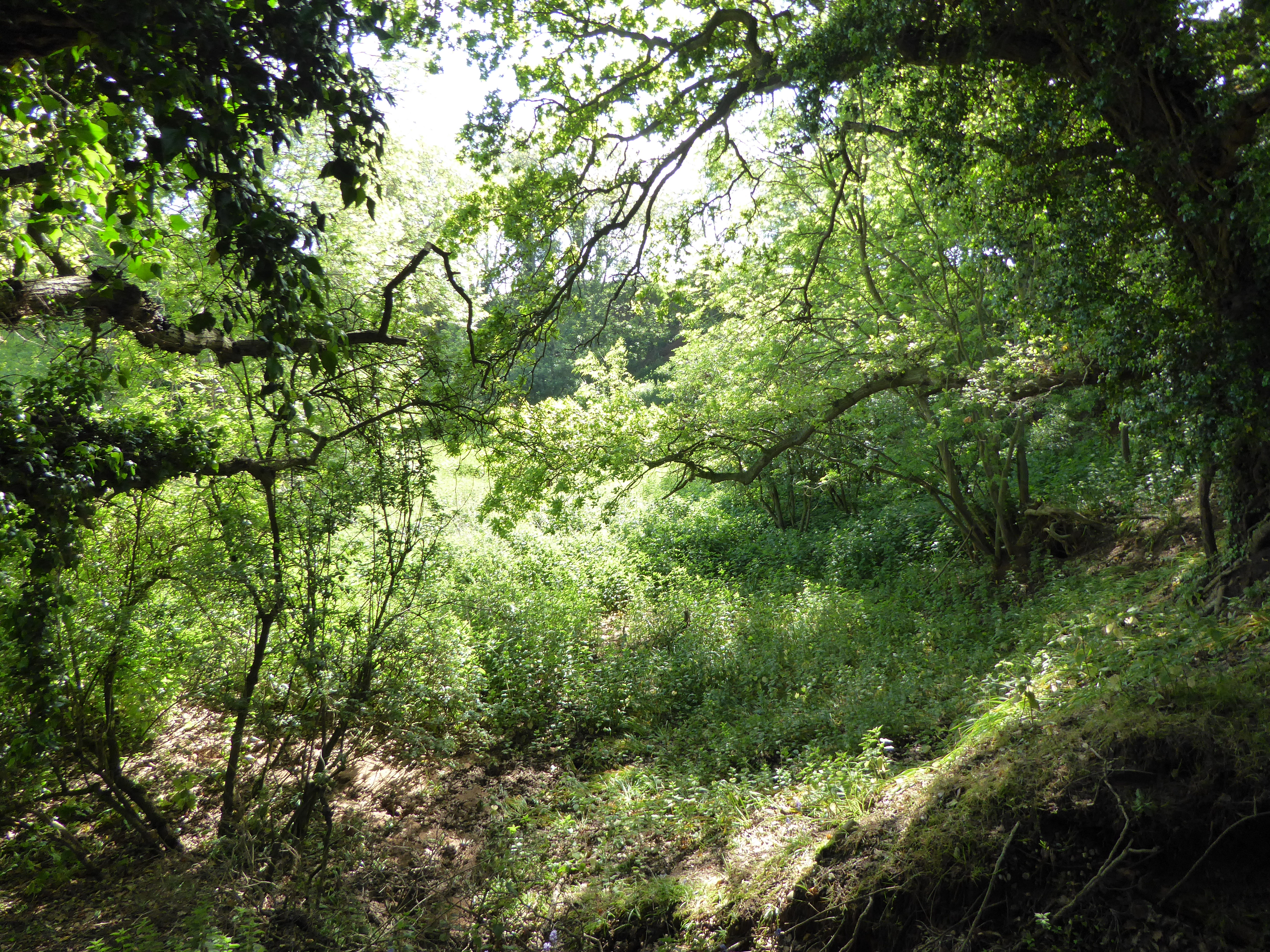
- Location of Neutral Farm Pit, Butley.
- Area of search: Suffolk
- Grid reference: TM 371 510
- Interest: Geological
- Area: 1.1 hectares
- Notification date: 1985
- Location map: Magic Map

Neutral Farm Pit, Butley is a 1.1-hectare (2.7-acre) geological Site of Special Scientific Interest in Butley, east of Woodbridge in Suffolk. It is a Geological Conservation Review site, and is in the Suffolk Coast and Heaths Area of Outstanding Natural Beauty.

This is described by Natural England as a classic site in the study of the Early Pleistocene in East Anglia. It was used by the nineteenth-century geologist Frederick W. Harmer to define his Butley division of the Red Crag Formation, and it has many fossils of marine molluscs.

There is access to the site from Mill Lane.
