= Living stump =

Example of a living stump. Note the growth of new wood around the section while the heartwood starts to decay.

An older living stump, where the heartwood has mostly decayed.

A living stump is a tree stump which is fed sap from a neighbouring tree through one or more root grafts, thus remaining alive and able to grow (hence the other name of "growing stump") despite lacking foliage.

== Description ==
Living stumps are characterized by the growth of new wood (callus) on the rim of the stump. Old stumps are typically hollow, with a wall of living tissue surrounding a cavity left by the decay of heartwood; however, in some species like the Douglas fir (Pseudotsuga menziesii), the growth of callus may be fast enough to "cap" the stump, which is then protected from decay and attacks by insects or fungi. A living stump can persist as long as its host tree remains alive, some reaching ages of 50, 60, 80 and up to 200 years.

== Formation ==
A living stump forms when a felled tree is connected to an intact tree through its roots; they are thus frequently found in dense stands of trees of the same species where root grafts are likelier. Most living stumps are located in a radius of 6 ft (1.8 meters) of the host tree, although distances of 20 ft (6 m) or even 50 ft (15 m) have been reported.
