= Leiston - Aldeburgh =

Protected area in Suffolk, England

Coordinates: 52.18°N 1.6°E

- Site of Special Scientific Interest
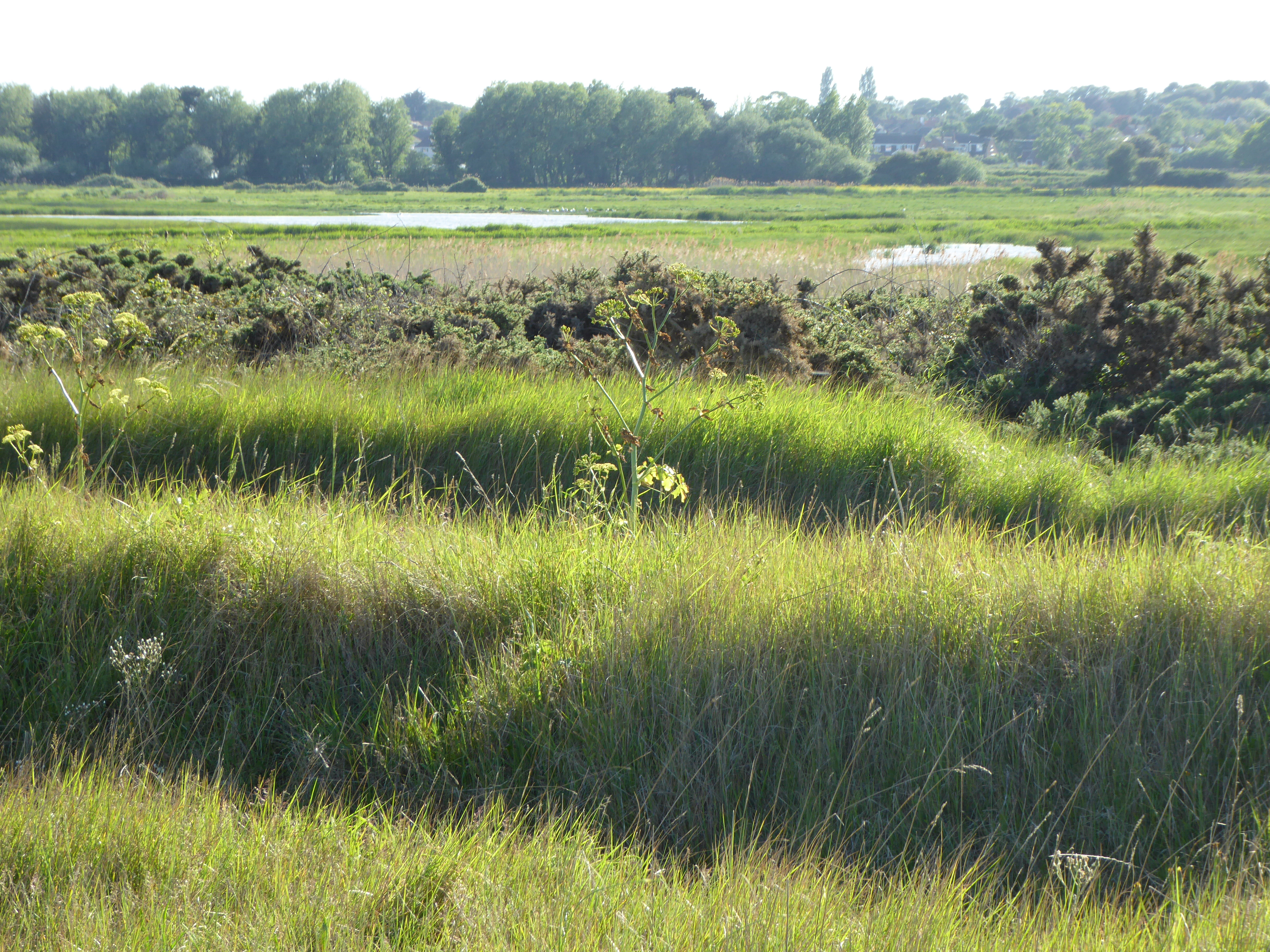
- The Haven Local Nature Reserve
- Location of Leiston - Aldeburgh.
- Area of search: Suffolk
- Grid reference: TM 463 597
- Interest: Biological
- Area: 534.8 hectares
- Notification date: 1999
- Location map: Magic Map

Leiston - Aldeburgh is a 534.8-hectare (1,322-acre) biological Site of Special Scientific Interest which stretches from Aldeburgh to Leiston in Suffolk. Part of it is The Haven, Aldeburgh Local Nature Reserve, and another area is the North Warren RSPB nature reserve. There is also a prehistoric bowl barrow on Aldringham Common, which is a Scheduled Monument. The site is in the Sandlings Special Protection Area under the European Union Directive on the Conservation of Wild Birds, and the Suffolk Coast and Heaths Area of Outstanding Natural Beauty.

This diverse site has open water, fen, acid grassland, scrub, woodland, heath and vegetated shingle. There are many breeding and overwintering birds, abundant dragonflies, and nationally scarce plants such as mossy stonecrop and clustered clover.
