= The Parrot and Punchbowl, Aldringham =

Coordinates: 52.1932°N 1.5774°E

Parrot and Punchbowl
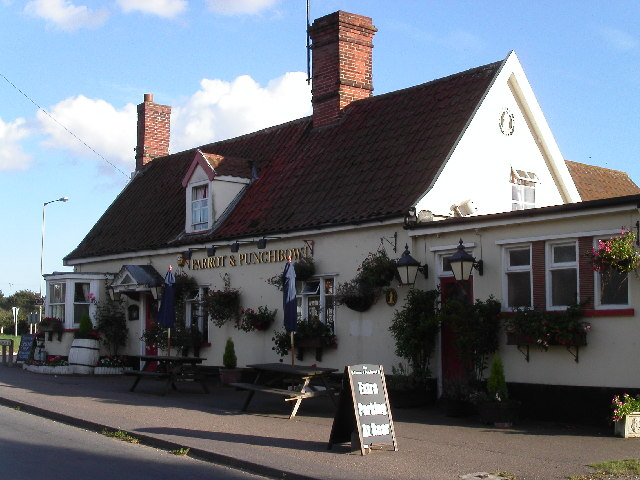
- Former names: The Case is Altered, Parrot Inn, The Parrot and Punchbowl

General information
- Address: B1353 Aldringham, Leiston IP16 4PY
- Town or city: Aldringham, Suffolk
- Country: England
- Opening: 1500s
- Owner: Chris Theobald and David James

Other information
- Parking: Yes

The Parrot and Punchbowl is a 16th-century English pub in the Suffolk village of Aldringham in the Aldringham-cum-thorpe parish. It is a Grade II listed building associated with a history of smuggling. Its current title is The Parrot.

== History ==
=== Early years and name changes ===
Built around 1576, the pub is the oldest building in the Aldringham-cup-thorpe parish. The pub was originally called The Case is Altered but was renamed in 1604 by the Kemp family. The English bibliophile and publisher John Camden Hotten, and Dutch author Jacob Larwood cite the pub as an example in The History of Signboards, From the Earliest Times to the Present Day, 1866. The book states that punchbowls were added to pub signboards at the end of the seventeenth century and signified "political prestige" and punch was the choice of drink for the Whigs and functioned as a "kind of party badge" for pubs.

=== Smuggling connections ===
Aldringham was a hotspot for smuggling in the 17th and 18th century and the pub is connected with this history. In 1778, two smugglers were arrested on the premises. In 2004, the Parrot's website recalled an account written in 1892 by Leiston local Lewis Chandler. Chandler documented a large-scale arrest that confiscated twelve horses, six carts, and three hundred tubs of gin. This was poured away outside the pub and locals dug a sump hole to catch it in pails. One man became so intoxicated on contaminated alcohol that he died within 24 hours.

In 1933 former pub landlord Charles Kemp told a local reporter,

It was one of my Grandfather’s delight's to tell how smuggled goods were brought daily to The Parrot from Thorpeness and how at 11:00 sharp every night an old mare that wandered the Common during the day was harnessed and conveyed smuggled goods from the Aldringham Parrot to Bromeswell where they were transferred to Ipswich.

No evidence has emerged to support local folklore that a secret tunnel exists under the pub.

=== Twentieth century ===
In 1982, a June / July edition of the East Anglian beer house magazine Last Orders reported that the pub was up for sale by Allied Brewers (Ind Coope) after previously being leased to Tolly Cobbold. In the same year, a December edition of Last Orders reported that the pub had reopened as a Free house. The pub was listed as a Grade II building by Historic England in August 1983.

In 2017, the pub was acquired by Chris Theobald and David James, the co-owners of The Dolphin pub in Thorpeness and directors of Alde Valley Foods The pub uses local suppliers including a local butcher and greengrocer and does not use plastic straws and stirrers. Fish is sourced sustainably from Lowestoft. The Parrot is a dog friendly pub. Regular events include the 'Parrot Puzzler' quiz. Recent promotional material and websites refer to the pub as The Parrot but its signage continues to display its full name.

During the COVID-19 pandemic, the pub opened up a space dubbed 'the Outside Inn.'

In February 2022, Theobald discussed the pub's history on the Suffolk Money podcast.

== Skull discovery in 1987 ==
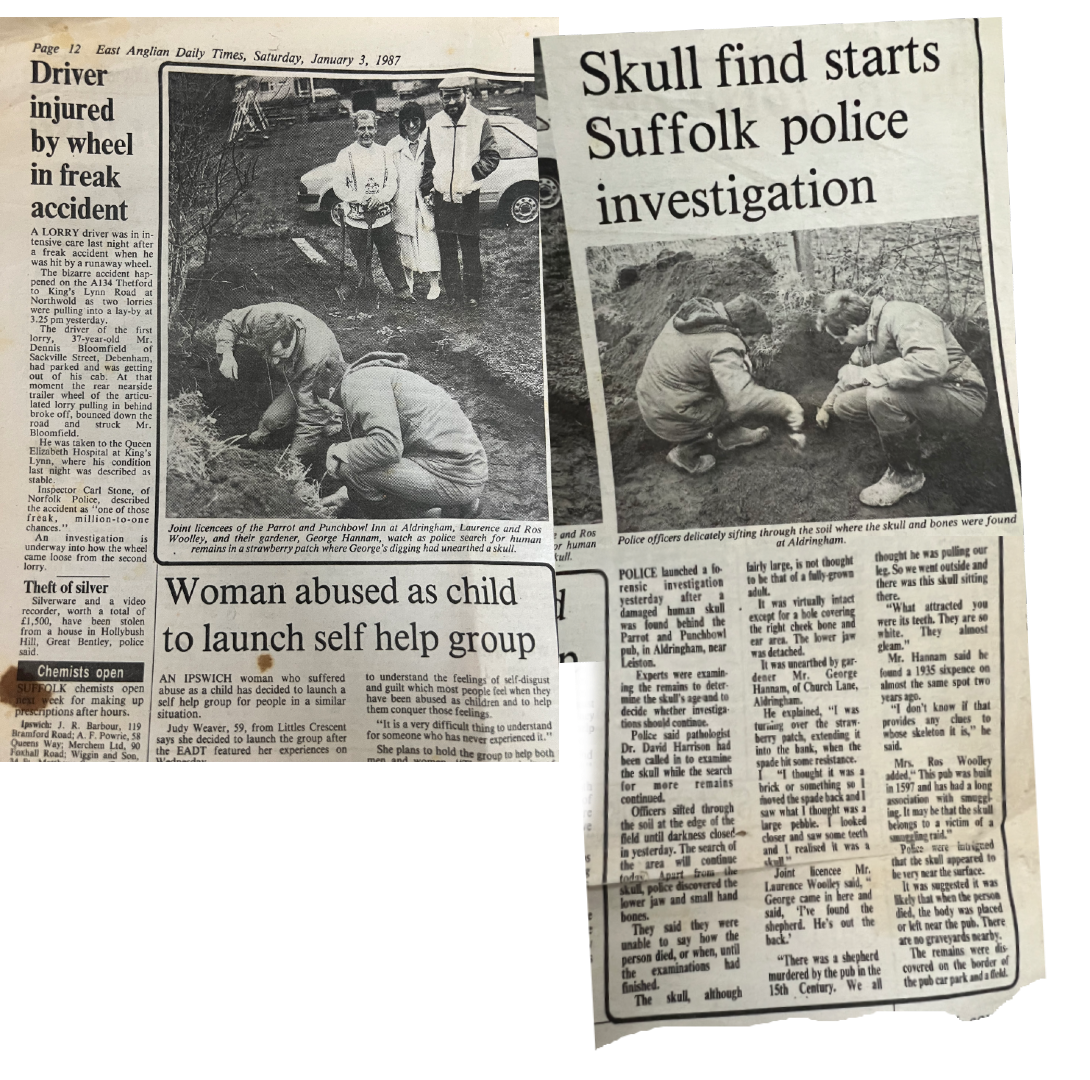
Newspaper report on Parrot and Punchbowl pub in Aldringham Suffolk after police investigation into skull discovery.

On 2 January 1987 police launched a forensic investigation after a human skull was discovered in a strawberry patch on the pub's grounds, close to the soil's surface. It was unearthed by gardener George Hannam. On 3 January 1987 joint licensee Laurence Woolley told the East Anglian Daily Times:

George came in here and said, 'I've found the shepherd. He's out the back. There was a shepherd murdered by the pub in the 15th century. We all thought he was pulling our leg. So we went outside and there was this skull sitting there. What attracted you were its teeth. They are so white. They almost gleam.

Joint licensee Ros Woolley told the East Anglian Daily Times, "it may be that the skull belongs to a victim of a smuggling raid."

Pathologist Dr. David Harrison was called to examine the remains which included the skull, a lower jaw, and small hand bones. The East Anglian Daily Times reported that the skull was intact but included a hole covering the right cheek bone and ear area and the jaw was detached. Initial speculation concluded that the remains were not a fully-grown adult.

== Landlords ==
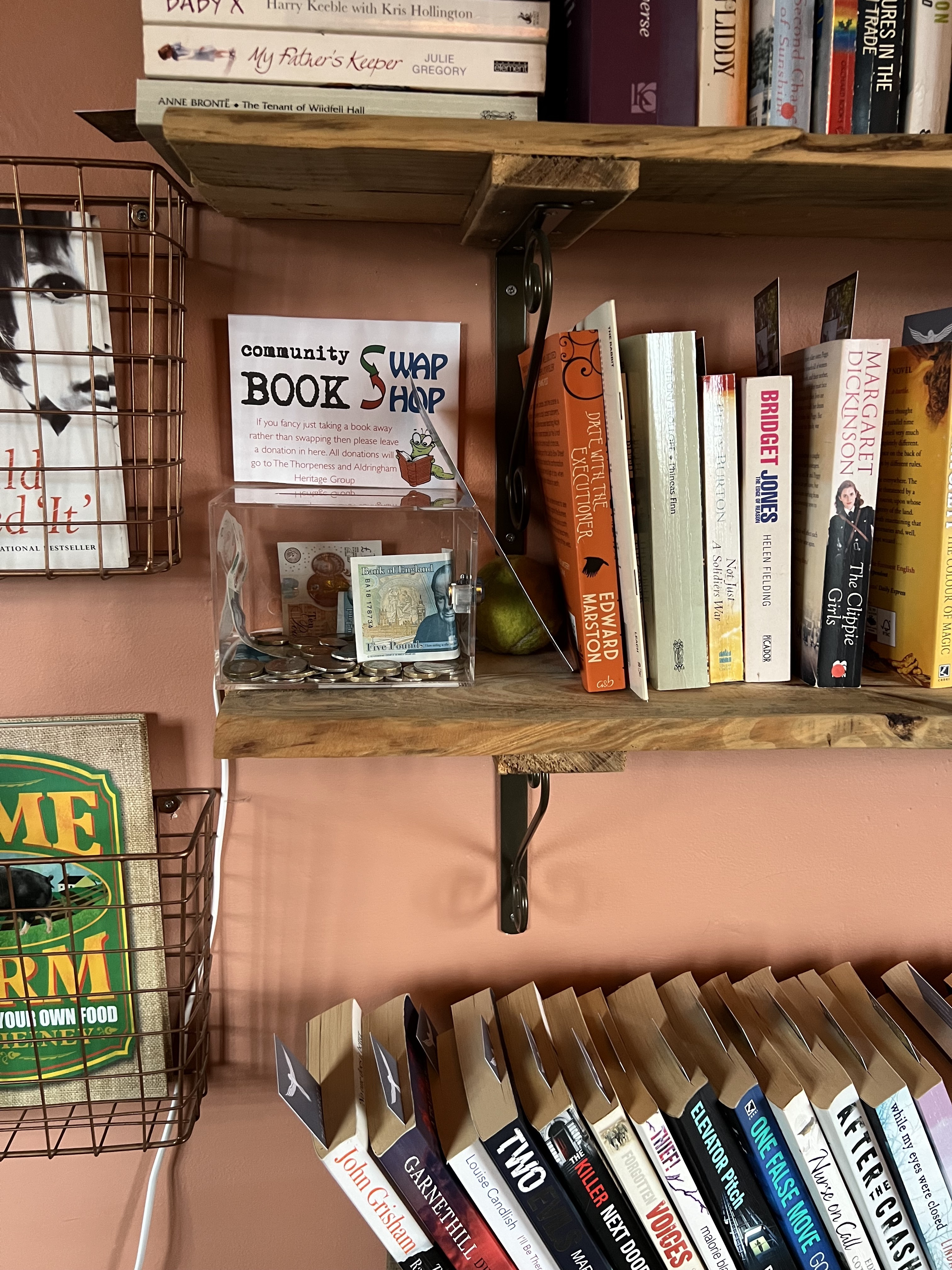
Photos of a community book swap scheme inside the Parrot and Punchbowl pub in Aldringham Suffolk

Charles Kemp acquired the pub in 1604 and the Kemp family ran the pub for more than 200 years. In 1933, a Kemp descendant (C.Kemp) still had ownership of the pub's first wooden sign which read, "Charles Kemp dealer in British wines, beer, porter, snuff and tobacco."

Census data and other records indicate some other individuals in residence in the pub's history and ownership by the Kemps, Coles, Marjoram's, Wolfe's, and Rivetts.

- 1765, William Starkey is listed in residence inside the Ipswich Journal
- From 1841 to 1881, Charles and Elizabeth Kemp appear in census records
- 1881, Mary Ann Kemp
- 1881, William Backhouse
- From 1888 to 1891, Thomas Cole and Eliza Cole listed in census data
- From 1892 to 1901, John Marjoram and Eliza Marjoram listed in census data
- 1911 to 1922, Agnes Wolfe and Frank Robert Wolfe listed in Kelly's Directory. An old sign, from when the pub was owned by Frank Wolfe, is viewable online.
- 1933 to 1937 Jas Wigg Rivetts, listed in Kelly's Directory
- 1982 to 1987, Laurence Woolley and Ros Woolley
- 2007 to 2017, Sheila Fleming
- 2017 to present day, Chris Theobald and David James
