= Crag Pit, Sutton =

Protected area in Suffolk, England

Coordinates: 52.06°N 1.379°E

- Site of Special Scientific Interest
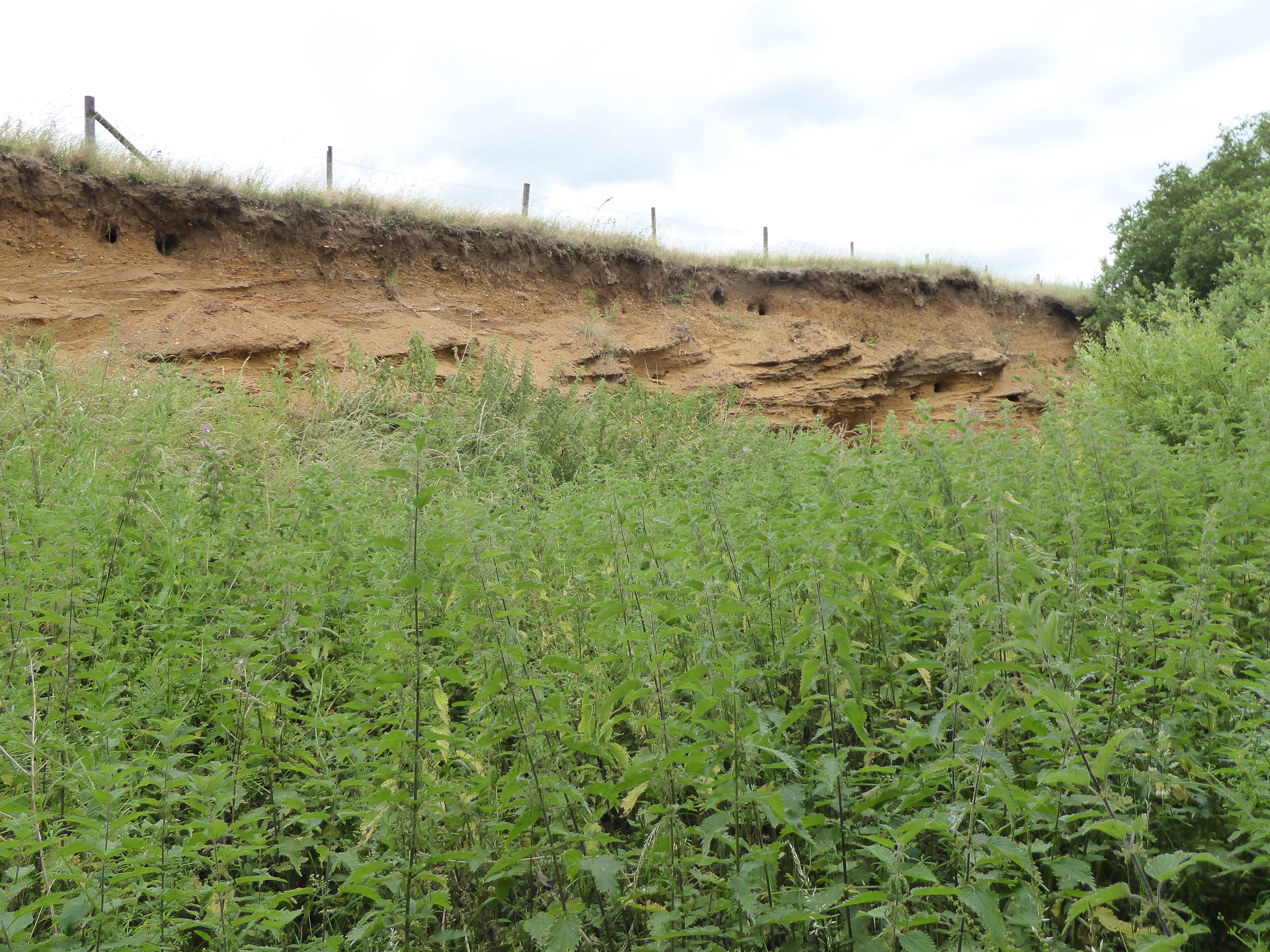
- Location of Crag Pit, Sutton.
- Area of search: Suffolk
- Grid reference: TM 317 456
- Interest: Biological
- Area: 0.7 hectares
- Notification date: 1985
- Location map: Magic Map

Crag Pit, Sutton is a 0.7-hectare (1.7-acre) biological Site of Special Scientific Interest north of Shottisham in Suffolk. It is in the Suffolk Coast and Heaths Area of Outstanding Natural Beauty.

This small disused quarry is described by Natural England as short rabbit-grazed grassland which supports one of only two British colonies of the endangered Small Alison flowering plants. Herbs include the uncommon mossy stonecrop.

As of June 2017, the site is covered with dense woodland, scrub and tall herbs, and there is little or no rabbit-grazed grassland.
