= Suffolk Coast =

Suffolk Coast may refer to:

== United Kingdom ==
The coast of Suffolk, a county of England

- Suffolk Coast National Nature Reserve, a wetland
- Suffolk Coast Path, a footpath
- Suffolk Coastal (UK Parliament constituency),
- Suffolk Coastal, a local government district which existed between 1974 and 2019
- Suffolk Coast and Heaths, an Area of Outstanding Natural Beauty

== United States ==
- Suffolk County, New York, a coastal county on Long Island
