= Purdis Farm =

Civil parish in Suffolk, England

Coordinates: 52.039°N 1.221°E

- Purdis Farm road sign

- Location within Suffolk
- Population: 2,092 (2011)
- Civil parish: Purdis Farm
- District: East Suffolk
- Shire county: Suffolk
- Region: East
- Country: England
- Sovereign state: United Kingdom
- Post town: Ipswich
- Postcode district: IP3
- UK Parliament: Suffolk Coastal

Purdis Farm is a civil parish, in the East Suffolk district, in the English county of Suffolk. It is located on the eastern edge of Ipswich and includes areas of suburban housing and industrial development along the A1156, including the area of Warren Heath. In 2001 the population of the area was 1743, the population increasing to 2,092 at the 2011 Census.

The Suffolk County Showground is located within the parish at Trinity Park, as are areas of farmland, part of Ipswich Golf Club and open areas such as part of Bixley Heath, a Site of Special Scientific Interest. The Suffolk Sandlings Walk passes through the area.
