= Suffolk Coast Path =

Long-distance footpath in Suffolk, England

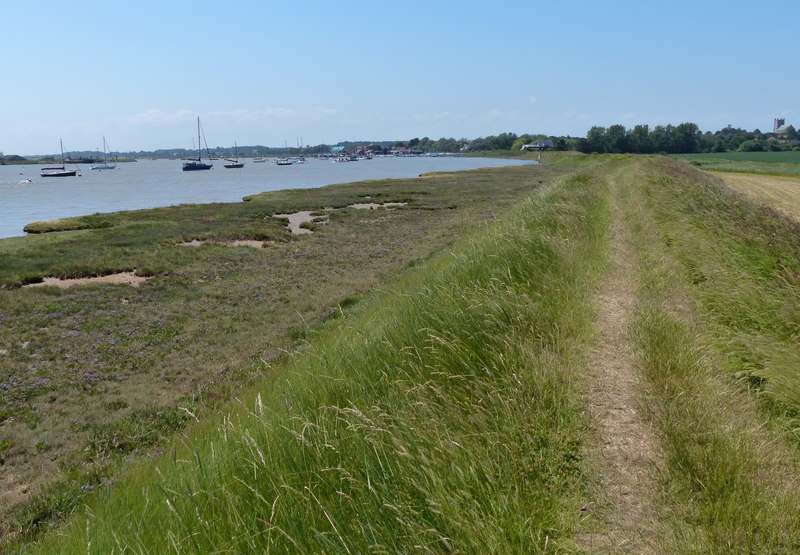
View near Orford

The Suffolk Coast Path is a long-distance footpath along the Suffolk Heritage Coast in England. It is 50 miles (80 km) long.

Previously known as the Suffolk Coast and Heaths Path after the Suffolk Coast and Heaths Area of Outstanding Natural Beauty through which it runs, the path has been rebranded with new waymarkers bearing the new name.

The path runs along river and sea walls, across marsh, heath, foreshore and cliffs. It starts at Felixstowe (51.9883°N 1.3907°E) and ends at Lowestoft (52.4711°N 1.7500°E), via Bawdsey, Snape Maltings, Aldeburgh, North Warren, Thorpeness, Minsmere, Dunwich, Southwold and Kessingland. It connects with the Sandlings Walk and (via the Stour and Orwell Walk) with the Essex Way and the Stour Valley Path.

Much of W. G. Sebald's novel The Rings of Saturn describes a walking tour that roughly follows the Suffolk Coast Path.

== See also ==
- Long-distance footpaths in the UK
- Sandlings Walk
- Stour Valley Path
