= Blaxhall Common =

Nature reserve in Suffolk, England

Blaxhall Heath
- Site of Special Scientific Interest
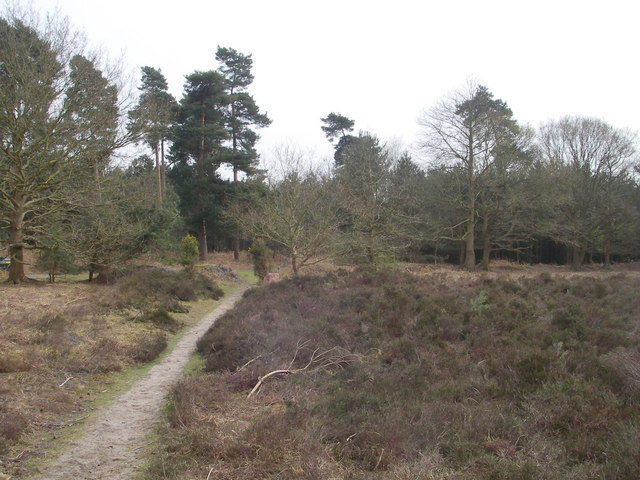

- Blaxhall Heath shown within Suffolk
- Location of Blaxhall Heath.
- Area of search: Suffolk
- Grid reference: TM 380 565
- Coordinates: 52.155°N 1.478°E
- Interest: Biological
- Area: 45.9 hectares (0.46 km^{2}; 0.18 sq mi)
- Notification date: 1987
- Location map: Magic Map

Blaxhall Common is a nature reserve in the parish of Blaxhall in the East Suffolk District of Suffolk. The reserve is owned by Blaxhall Parish Council and managed by Suffolk Wildlife Trust. It is designated a 45.9-hectare (113-acre) biological Site of Special Scientific Interest as Blaxhall Heath. It is part of the Sandlings Special Protection Area under the European Union Directive on the Conservation of Wild Birds, and of the Suffolk Coast and Heaths Area of Outstanding Natural Beauty. A Bronze Age bowl barrow is a Scheduled Monument.

== Location ==
The site is located on the Suffolk Sandlings, an area of sandy soil and glacial geology stretching along the Suffolk coast from Ipswich to Southwold. The traditional land cover was lowland dry heathland, but much of this landscape has been destroyed with isolated areas, such as at Blaxhall, surviving. The site is bordered to three sides by the Sandlings Forest SSSI.

Blaxhall Common is around 1 mile (1.6 km) east of Blaxhall and 2 miles (3.2 km) south-west of Snape on the B1069 road between Snape and Tunstall. It is 5 miles (8.0 km) south-west of Leiston and 8 miles (13 km) north-east of Woodbridge. It falls on the edge of the Suffolk Coast and Heaths Area of Outstanding Natural Beauty (AONB).

== Plant and wildlife ==
The heath is mainly heathers with a mosaic of heather and acidic grassland habitats. The Silver-studded blue butterfly was reintroduced at the site in 2007. Bird species present include nightjar, woodlark and tree pipit with reptiles such as the common lizard and adder Vipera berus established on the site. There are also colonies of solitary bees and ant-lions.

The heath is managed through seasonal cutting of vegetation, especially invasive species, in order to maintain a variety of habitats. Hebridean sheep and Exmoor ponies have also been introduced at the site in order to assist management. A car park is maintained by the Suffolk Wildlife Trust to allow access to the reserve.

== Archaeology ==
An ancient boundary bank forms the southern edge of the site and is well preserved and the northern area of the heath is the site of a Bronze Age bowl barrow standing around 1.2 metres (3.9 ft) tall. The barrow is a scheduled ancient monument. The common includes a number of Iron Age sites as well as a wide World War II anti-glider ditch. This provides habitats for solitary bees and lizards.

== See also ==
- List of Sites of Special Scientific Interest in Suffolk
- Suffolk Coast and Heaths
