= Sandlings Walk =

Long-distance footpath in Suffolk, England

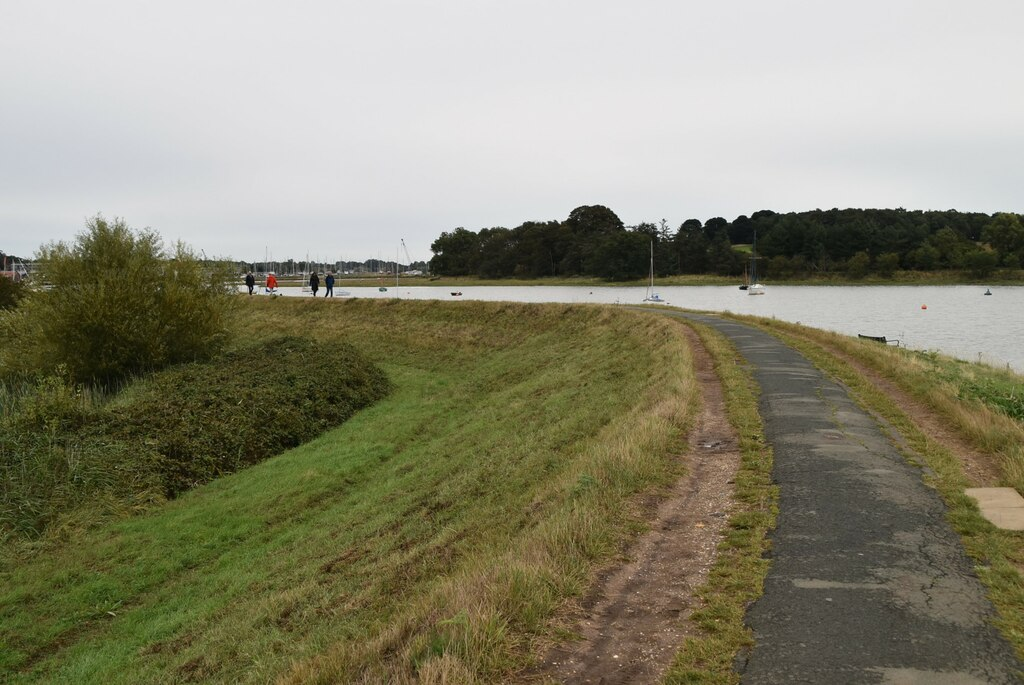
At Woodbridge, Suffolk

The Sandlings Walk is a long-distance path in Suffolk, England. It runs 91.6 km through the Suffolk Sandling that used to stretch from the outskirts of Ipswich to Southwold which is an area of lowland heath, Britain's rarest wildlife habitat, and the Suffolk Coast and Heaths Area of Outstanding Natural Beauty.

Starting on the outskirts of Ipswich (trailheads at 52.0620°N 1.2053°E, 52.0548°N 1.2022°E, and 52.0420°N 1.1985°E), the route passes through Rushmere Common, Sutton Heath, Rendlesham Forest, Butley Corner, Tunstall Forest, Friston, North Warren, Thorpeness, Sizewell, Minsmere, Dunwich Heath, Dunwich Forest, the Suffolk Coast National Nature Reserve and Southwold (trailhead at 52.3231°N 1.6772°E).

== See also ==
- Long-distance footpaths in the UK
- Suffolk Coast Path
