= Lapwood =

Lapwood is a surname. Notable people with the surname include:

- Anna Lapwood (born 1995), British organist, conductor, and broadcaster
- Doug Lapwood, New Zealand association football player
- Harry Lapwood (1915–2007), New Zealand soldier and politician
- Inigo Lapwood (born 1993), British arts director and marine engineer

== See also ==
- Larwood
