= Thorpeness Windmill =

Historic windmill in Suffolk, England

Thorpeness Mill
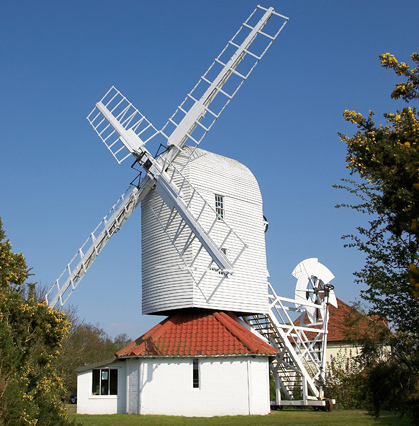
- Thorpeness Mill

Origin
- Mill name: Thorpeness Mill
- Mill location: TM 468 598
- Coordinates: 52.1815°N 1.6089°E
- Operator(s): Private
- Year built: 1923

Information
- Purpose: Pumping water
- Type: Hollow Post mill
- Roundhouse storeys: One storey
- No. of sails: Four Sails
- Type of sails: Patent sails
- Windshaft: Cast iron
- Winding: Fantail
- Fantail blades: Six blades
- Type of pump: Three throw pump

Thorpeness Windmill is a Grade II listed post mill at Thorpeness, Suffolk, England which was built in 1803 at Aldringham and moved to Thorpeness in 1923. Originally built as a corn mill, it was converted to a water pumping mill when it was moved to Thorpeness. It pumped water to the House in the Clouds.

== History ==
Thorpeness Mill was built as a corn mill at Aldringham in 1803. In the 1890s the Ogilvy family were the millers.

In the winter of 1922, Aldringham Mill was dismantled by Messrs Whitmore's, millwrights of Wickham Market. Amos Clarke was millwright in charge. It was rebuilt at Thorpeness to supply water to the House in the Clouds, which was really a water tower disguised as a house.

The mill was used to supply the House in the clouds until 1940, when an engine was installed to do the job. During the war, some children blocked the tramway that the winding wheels driven by the fantail run on, with the result that the steps lifted up and the mill tilted forward, leaving the steps in the air. Although a number of men sat on the steps of the mill, it would not return to its natural state. Millwright Ted Friend, of Whitmore's was called in and soon restored the mill to normal with deft use of a sledge hammer. In 1972, the fantail was blown off in a storm and in September 1973 the mill was damaged by a fire on the heath where it stands. One sail and stock were destroyed. In 1975, Suffolk Coastal District Council, Thorpeness Estate and the Countryside Commission granted money to enable the mill to be restored. The mill was restored in 1977 and subsequently purchased from the Thorpeness Estate by Suffolk County Council.

In 2010 the Council put the Windmill on the market for sale at an estimated price of £150,000.

The Council accepted an offer of £72,100 in November 2010 (figures from Land Registry)

== Description ==
Thorpeness Mill is a post mill on a single-storey roundhouse. It is winded by a fantail arranged in the Suffolk style. The four Patent sails are carried on a cast-iron windshaft. The brake wheel drives a three throw pump which pumped water from a well 28 feet (8.53 m) deep to water tanks housed in the House in the Clouds. The mill could pump 1,800 imperial gallons (8,200 L) per hour. The mill is winded by a six-bladed fantail mounted on the ladder.

== Millers ==
- Ogilvy 1890s–1922

== Public access ==
Thorpeness Windmill is now in private hands and as such there is no public access. The windmill will be open on an ad hoc basis by the owner. For more information, look for "Friends of Thorpeness Windmill" on Facebook.
