= The Haven, Aldeburgh =

Nature reserve in Aldeburgh, England

Coordinates: 52.164°N 1.606°E

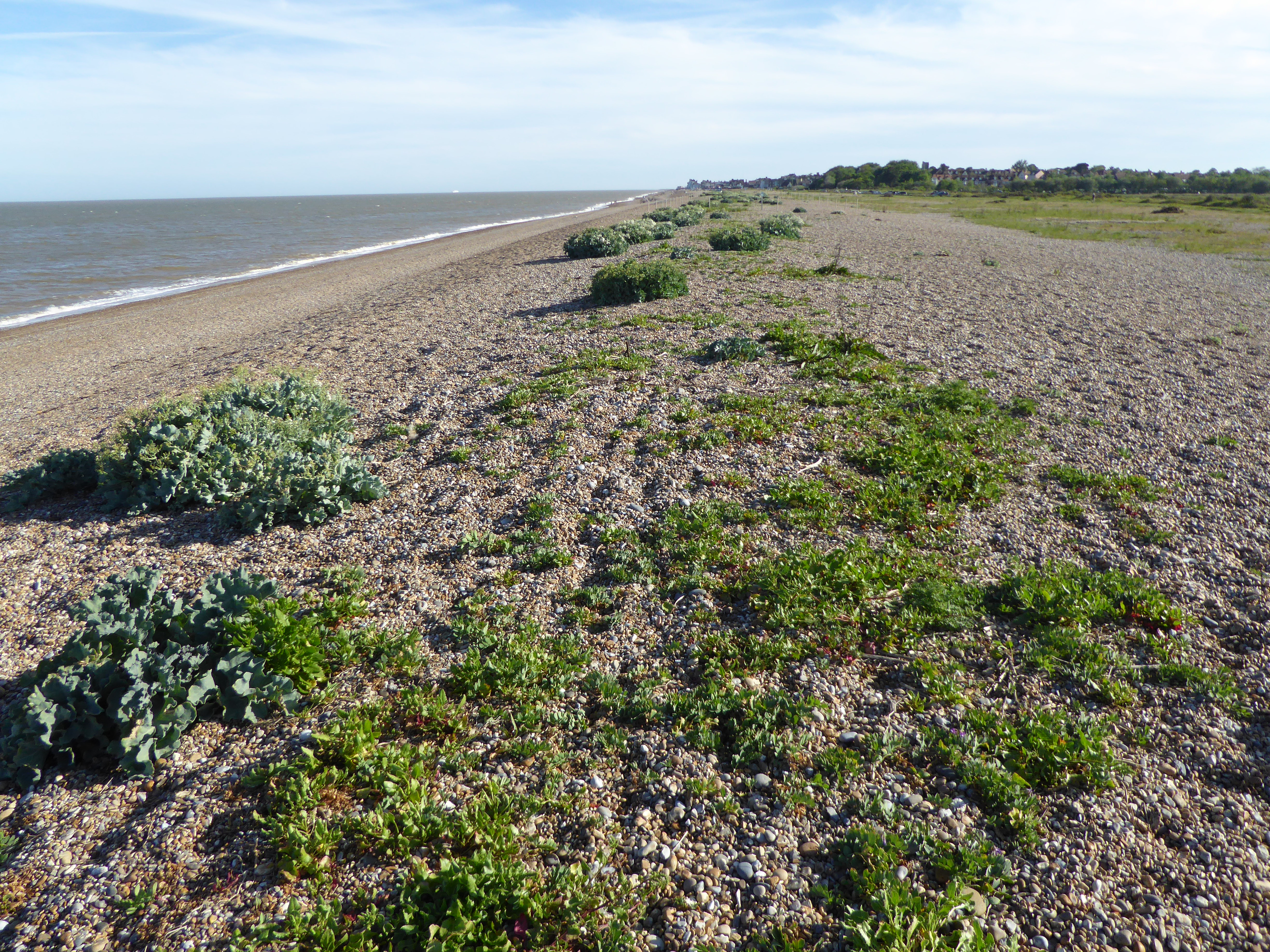
- Interactive map of The Haven, Aldeburgh
- Type: Local Nature Reserve
- Location: Aldeburgh, Suffolk
- OS grid: TM 467 579
- Area: 20.2 hectares (50 acres)
- Manager: Suffolk Coast and Heaths Area of Outstanding Natural Beauty

The Haven, Aldeburgh is a 20.2 hectare Local Nature Reserve in Aldeburgh in Suffolk. It is owned by East Suffolk Council and managed by the Suffolk Coast and Heaths Area of Outstanding Natural Beauty. It is in the Leiston - Aldeburgh Site of Special Scientific Interest and Suffolk Coast and Heaths Area of Outstanding Natural Beauty.

The site covers the beach north of Aldeburgh and an area of lagoons and reedbeds which are protected as nature reserves. It has a sculpture called Scallop by Maggi Hambling, designed as a tribute to Benjamin Britten.

The beach is open to the public, but not the lagoons and reedbeds.
