= Larwood =

Larwood is a surname. Notable people with the surname include:

- Harold Larwood (1904–1995), British cricketer
- Jacob Larwood (1826–1918), Dutch author
- Marek Larwood (born 1976), English comedian and actor

== See also ==
- Harwood (name)
- Lapwood
- Larwood Bridge
