= Aldringham cum Thorpe =

Civil parish in Suffolk, England

Coordinates: 52.176°N 1.600°E

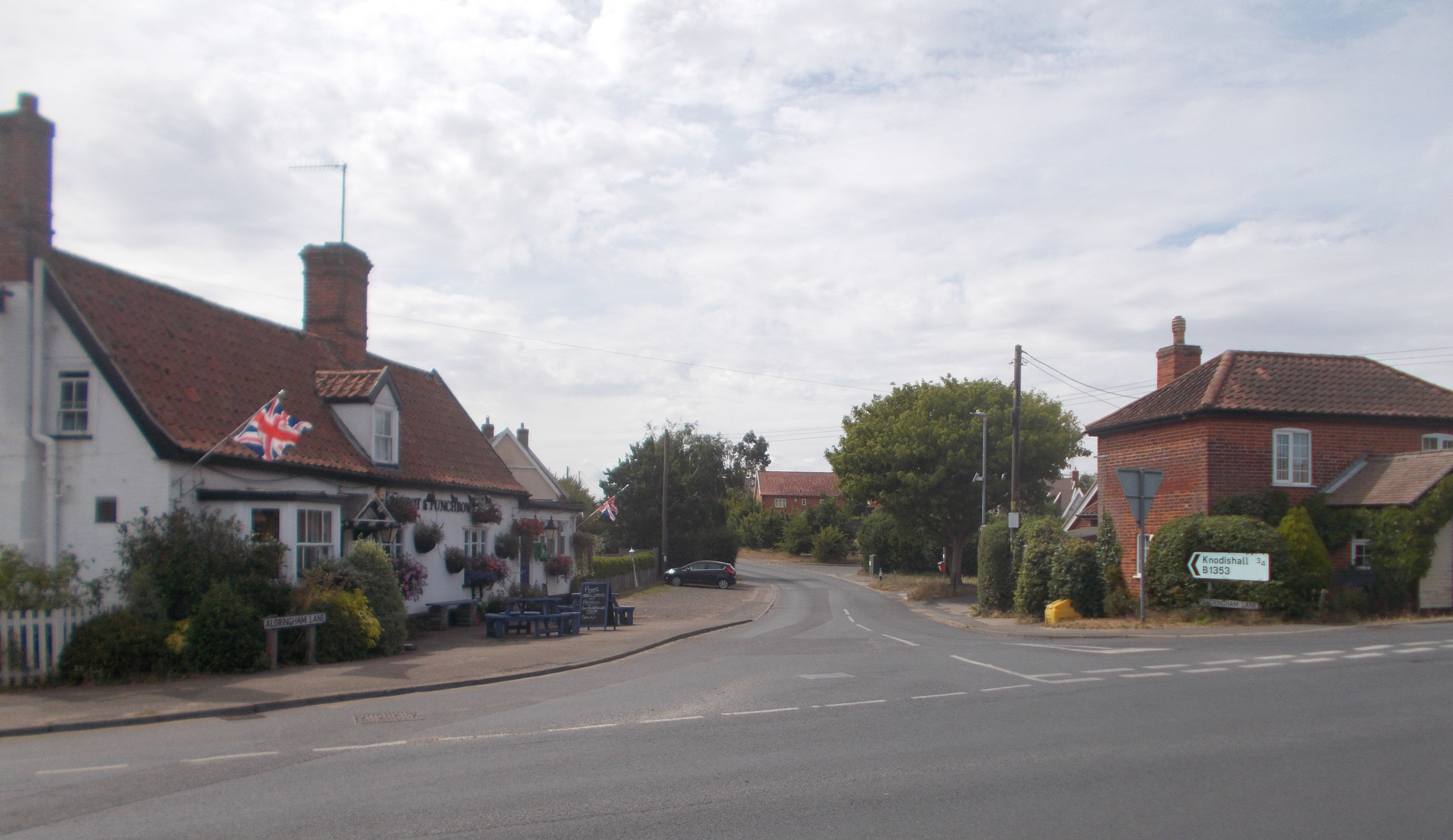
- The Parrot and Punchbowl pub at Aldringham corner, by the lane leading to Knodishall

- Location within Suffolk
- Population: 759 (2011)
- District: East Suffolk
- Shire county: Suffolk
- Region: East
- Country: England
- Sovereign state: United Kingdom
- Post town: Leiston
- Postcode district: IP16
- Dialling code: 01728
- Police: Suffolk
- Fire: Suffolk
- Ambulance: East of England
- UK Parliament: Suffolk Coastal

Aldringham cum Thorpe is a civil parish in the East Suffolk district of Suffolk, England. Located south of the town of Leiston, the parish includes the villages of Aldringham and Thorpeness, which is on the coast, between Sizewell (north) and Aldeburgh (south). In 2007 it had an estimated population of 700, rising to 759 at the 2011 Census.

== Thorpe ==
For Thorpeness holiday village, see Thorpeness.

The common Old Scandinavian name of "Thorp" signifies a small settlement, often a farm, outlying from a mother village upon which it was dependent, and in this sense the coastal settlement of that name should be understood in relation, probably, to Aldringham, with which it has long been associated.

=== Hundred river: northern boundary of the Wicklaw ===
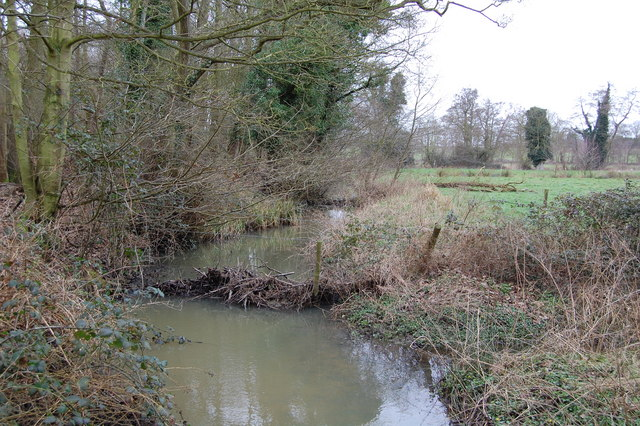
Hundred river, Aldringham

Aldringham and Thorpe lie at the southern extremity of the Blything Hundred, its boundary with the more southerly Hundred of Plomesgate lying along the line of the Aldringham Hundred river. In more ancient terms, this was also the boundary between the "Wicklaw" (the domain of five-and-a-half Hundreds centred upon Rendlesham and Sutton Hoo, also called the "Liberty of St Etheldreda"), the power-base of the 7th-century Wuffinga kings of the East Angles, and the corresponding domain of Blything centred upon a likely royal foundation at Blythburgh.

The Hundred stream passes from near Knodishall church through the silted valley of Knodishall Common and south of Coldfair Green. It crosses the Leiston to Aldeburgh road just south of the Aldringham crossroads and, overlooked by the knoll at Aldringham church, flows into the fenny vale of the RSPB North Warren area before feeding into the Thorpeness Meare. The notable Roman site near Knodishall church thus communicated with the sea by this historic, now silted waterway: it stood in significant relation to the former maritime haven now represented by the low ground to the west of the coastal road between Aldeburgh and Thorpeness, within the defensive compass of the Saxon Shore.

=== Manors: Domesday and later ===
At the Domesday Survey of 1086, the estates of Aldringham and the manors of Thorpe were distinct. At Thorpe there were two manors with ploughteams and wood for several hogs, one of 50 acres (with 2 acres also in Dunwich) held by the freeman Wolmer, and the other of 20 acres held by Ulmar (probably the same person). William Malet, the father of Robert (who held the Aldringham estates), was seised of both, and Roger Bigod, 1st Earl of Norfolk was tenant-in-chief. There was also a Domesday holding of 69 acres, with 2 acres of meadow and wood for 20 hogs, held by a freeman under Earl Alan, who with the king had the soke of that land.

William Bigod, son of Roger, granted Edric of Thorpe together with all the lands, men and services in Thorp and Dunwich to the Priory of the Virgin Mary and St Andrew in Thetford, which his father had founded. However the manor was vested in Leiston Abbey, and at its dissolution in 1536 was granted by the Crown to Charles Brandon, 1st Duke of Suffolk. A medieval stone chapel stood at Thorpe, which fell into disuse after the Reformation, but which formed a chapelry attached to the advowson and rectory of Aldringham church during the 17th century. The advowson of Aldringham had been granted first to Butley Priory, and then transferred to Leiston Abbey, by Ranulf de Glanvill, founder of those houses, during the later 12th century.

=== Benefit of wrecks ===
Thorpe is mentioned in the 12th-century foundation endowments of Snape Priory. William Martel, Albreda his wife, and Geoffrey Martel, their son and heir, granted their manors of Snape and Aldeburgh, and that of Friston, to the abbot and monastery of St John at Colchester, so that they should establish a prior and monks as a cell at Snape. With the manor of Snape was granted the benefit of wrecks from the sea, from Thorpe to Orford Ness.
