= Sizewell Hall =

Christian centre in Suffolk, England

Coordinates: 52.2007°N 1.6209°E

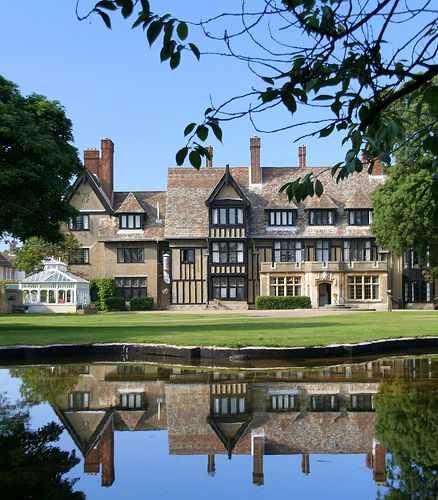
Sizewell Hall in 2005

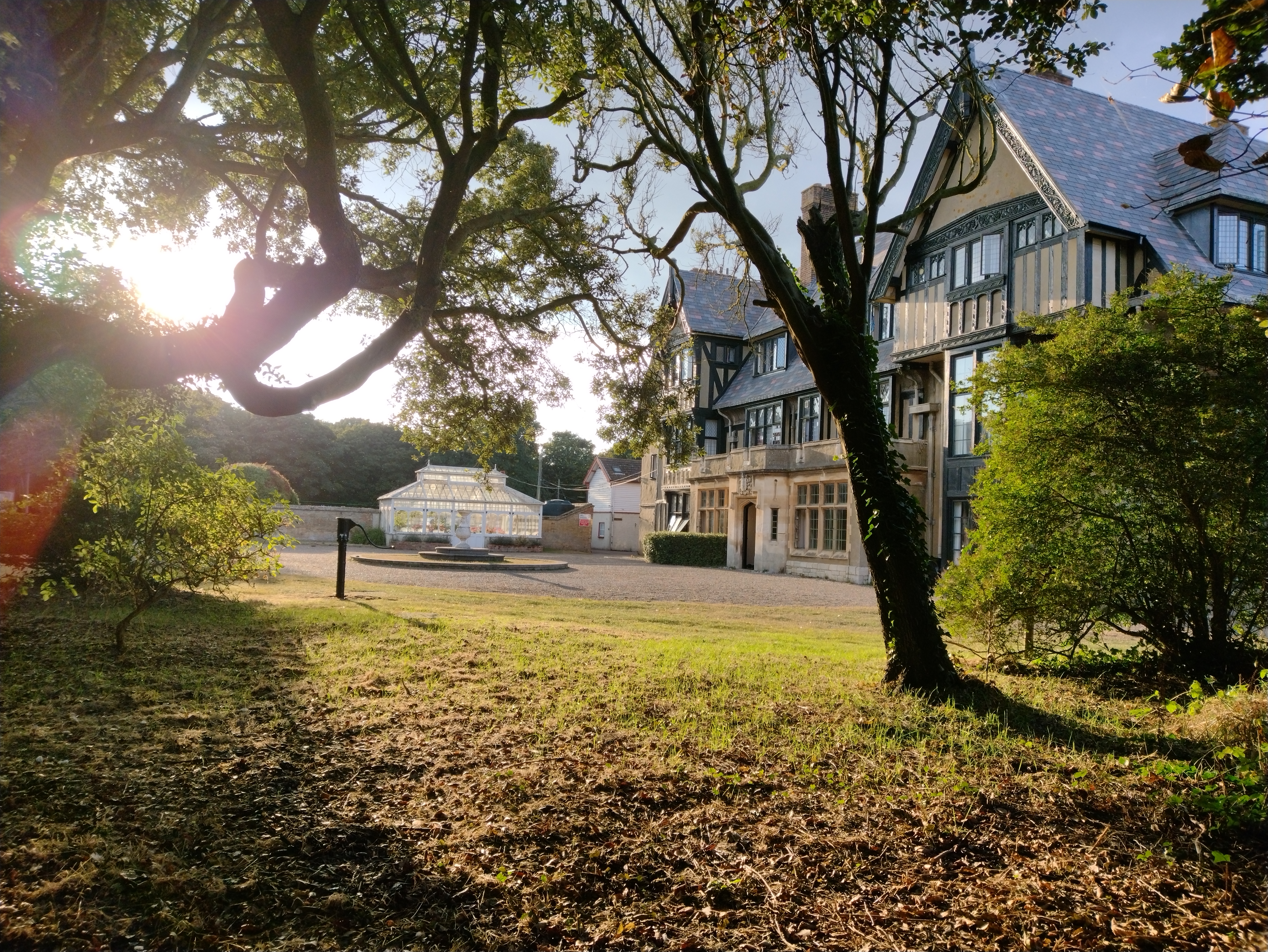
Sizewell Hall in 2021

Sizewell Hall houses a Christian conference centre in Sizewell on the Suffolk coast, England. The estate is owned by the Ogilvie family. Back in the 1950s it housed a progressive school for 7–13s. It has historical connections with a classic taxidermy collection. The present Christian conference centre is run by Sizewell Hall Ltd, a registered charity. In 2007, 6,500 visitors stayed there, mainly local church groups from East Anglia, national bodies and a local youth organisation CYM from Ipswich. CYM has developed an activity holiday for schoolchildren in the African Village in the Hall grounds.

== History ==
The Ogilvie family bought the estate in 1859, increased it to over 6,000 acres (24 km^{2}) and enlarged the house. Mrs Margaret Ogilvie as a benefactress set up a research award (readership in ophthalmology) at Oxford University From this house not far from RSPB Minsmere, the ophthalmic surgeon Fergus Menteith Ogilvie (1861–1918) formed a large collection of British birds, which in partnership with the taxidermist Thomas Gunn of Norwich was mounted in cases with simulated habitats. The collection, now in Ipswich Museum, is seen as the best of its kind in Britain.

Sizewell Hall was rebuilt after a fire in 1920. Glencairn Stuart Ogilvie developed nearby Thorpeness as a resort. The Ogilvie family moved out when the army commandeered the Hall during the Second World War.

After the war, Sizewell Hall housed a boarding school run by a Dutch Quaker, Harry Tuyn. One of its pupils was Sheridan Morley. The school closed in 1955. It was a progressive, co-educational establishment (though not to be confused with the progressive Summerhill School at Leiston nearby). It has been claimed that pupils could study what they liked, if they liked, and that subjects such as Geography, Maths and Latin were not taught on the grounds that they were too boring. However, this has not been confirmed by other pupils or staff. Indeed, a copy of Kennedy's Latin Primer from Sizewell Hall School gave to Benjamin Britten and Myfanwy Piper the words for Miles's Latin Benedicite in Britten's opera The Turn of the Screw.

In the 1960s the Hall served as quarters for Taylor Woodrow as the firm built Sizewell A nuclear power station.

Sizewell Hall was used as a location for television adaptations of The Lost Prince and Lovejoy.

The grounds today include a camp site, a children's park, tennis courts, a sports hall, a squash court and an activity course.
