= Bixley Heath =

Biological Site of Special Scientific Interest

Coordinates: 52.041°N 1.205°E

- Site of Special Scientific Interest
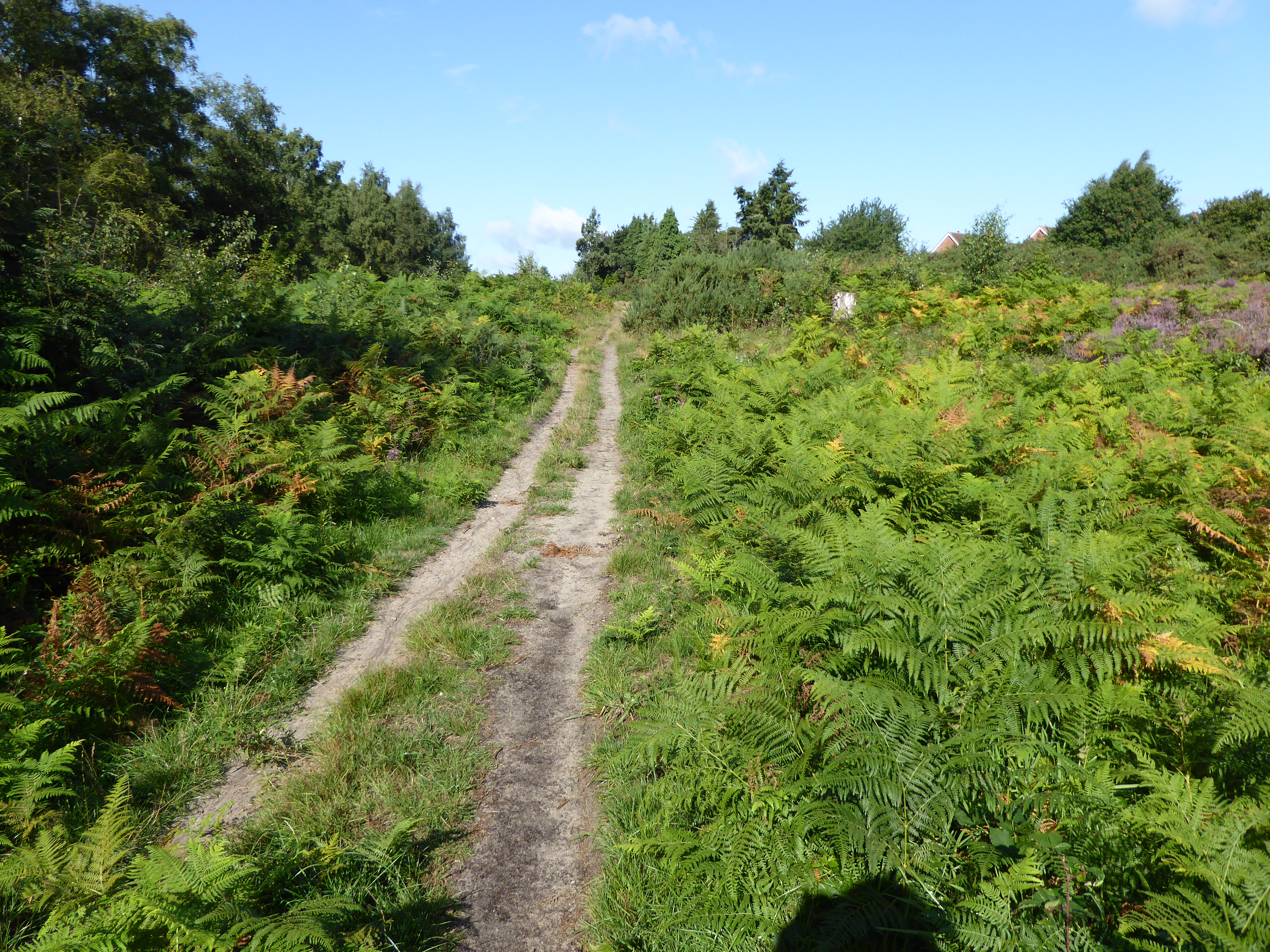
- Location of Bixley Heath.
- Area of search: Suffolk
- Grid reference: TM 199 429
- Interest: Biological
- Area: 5.1 hectares
- Notification date: 1990
- Location map: Magic Map

Bixley Heath is a 5.1-hectare (13-acre) biological Site of Special Scientific Interest on the eastern outskirts of Ipswich in Suffolk. It is also a Local Nature Reserve owned and managed by Ipswich Borough Council.

== Location ==
The heath is split between the Ipswich Borough Council and East Suffolk council areas. It is located adjacent to the Broke Hall Farm and Purdis Farm areas of Ipswich and to the west of Ipswich Golf Club on the edge of the urban area.

== Ecology ==
The site is part of the Suffolk Sandlings area and consists of lowland dry heathland and scarce swamp vegetation along a small valley to the southern edge of the site. The heathland area of the site is dominated by the heather Calluna vulgaris. Other heathers and grass species, such as Common Bent-grass Agrostis capillaris are also present, with some Bracken and scrub tree species on the edges of the site.

The swamp area of the site has Lesser Pond-sedge Carex acutiformis as the dominant plant species, with other species such as Great Reedmace Typha latifolia and Great Willowherb Epilobium hirsutum found in the area. Sallow is found throughout the swamp area with some areas of open reed bed where Common Reed Phragmites australis is found.

Some springs in Bixley Heath contribute to the Bucklesham Mill River.

== Access ==
There is access from Bucklesham Road and Salehurst Road.
