= Cecil Howard Lay =

British poet (1885–1956)

Cecil Howard Lay (1885–1956) was an English poet of the Georgian school, architect and artist, closely associated with his native Suffolk.

== Life ==
Lay was born in the village of Aldringham, near Leiston, Suffolk, the son of the village schoolmaster (from a seafaring family) and his mother of agricultural family origins. His father was competent at drawing. Discouraged from mixing socially with the children of the village school, and given a private tutor, Cecil was next sent to the Ipswich School where he was a weekly boarder. He wished to become an artist, but was trained (at first in Ipswich) as an architect, being elected as an associate of the Royal Institute of British Architects in 1912. He then travelled in Belgium and the Netherlands for a while, studying painting, and became a close friend of Frank Brangwyn, and also corresponded with Ezra Pound.

After service during the Great War he returned to Suffolk and seldom left it again. As an architect, he designed a series of innovative buildings, mainly large private dwellings, incorporating motifs from traditional Suffolk architecture in ways which were modern for their time. Most of these buildings are in the neighbourhood of Aldringham or Aldeburgh, including the house called Raidsend at Aldringham (an early work), a hall of late Art Nouveau style, with 'elongated Dutch gables, tall narrow windows and subtle pargetting'. He was elected Fellow of the R.I.B.A. in 1925.

Cecil Lay died in 1956 and was buried near his parents in Aldringham churchyard.

== Works ==
Lay's early prints show some debt to the manner of Aubrey Beardsley, but during the 1920s and 1930s he developed a distinctively deco manner, producing a considerable series of oils depicting family groups or pairs of characteristic Suffolk vernacular types in a pseudo-naive style and in vibrant colour. In his watercolours, landscapes are populated in less formal, more relaxed ways.

Lay's volumes of poems appeared mainly between 1927 and 1934. They are mainly collections of short lyrics in new Elizabethan manner, sometimes erotic, and, although rural and showing a countryman's sensibilities, without sentimentalism or any strong note of nostalgia. Cecil Lay married Joan Chadburn, daughter of the painter Haworth Chadburn, in 1932. 'His origins, training and experience seem as if designed to produce that complex of rootedness and spiritual uprootedness that so often gives the artist's special oblique angle of view.' National Press opinions of his early verse comment on his Elizabethan frankness, simplicity, admirable lyrical impulse combined with tigerish intensity and focus, wit, beauty and blunt realism. His romantic sensibility was blended or moderated with classic restraint.

He was a friend of the Sieveking family and, although a project (by Martin Secker) to publish his collected poems had foundered in 1937, the broadcaster Lance Sieveking in 1962 published a Collected Poems of Cecil Lay with his own Introduction, and an extended quotation from an earlier Introduction intended for the original Secker volume of 1937, written by A. E. Coppard. Not only Coppard, but also Middleton Murry, Desmond MacCarthy and W. H. Davies had been attracted to Lay's poetry, and Lance Sieveking emphasised the ways in which the poems resembled those of W. H. Davies.

== Lay's tortoise ==
Over many years Cecil Lay made a very detailed study of the behaviour of his pet tortoise, and discovered that it performed what was believed to be a ceremonial dance shortly after emerging from hibernation, following a set pattern of convoluted progress at considerable speed. He also observed that the animal preferred to eat a variety of different vegetation in rotation as the seasons passed, rather than adhering to a single preferred foodplant. These observations received scholarly attention.

== Volumes of Poetry ==
- Sparrows and Other Poems (Fowler Wright, 1927)
- To Suffolk (separate, from the above) (Saint Catherine Press, London)
- Grotesques and Arabesques (Martin Secker, 1928)
- In and Out (?Martin Secker, 1930)
- Seven Poems (?Martin Secker, 1932)
- Eight Poems (W. H. Parkes, Leiston)
- April's Foal (Red Lion Press, London 1932)
- Ha and He (?Martin Secker, 1933)
- Samples (?Martin Secker, 1934)
- The Collected Poems of Cecil Lay (Introductions by A.E. Coppard and Lance Sieveking) (Benham 1962)
- An Adder in June, Selected poems (Introduction by Herbert Lomas) (Fry Gallery, Aldeburgh 1978)
