= Suffolk Show =

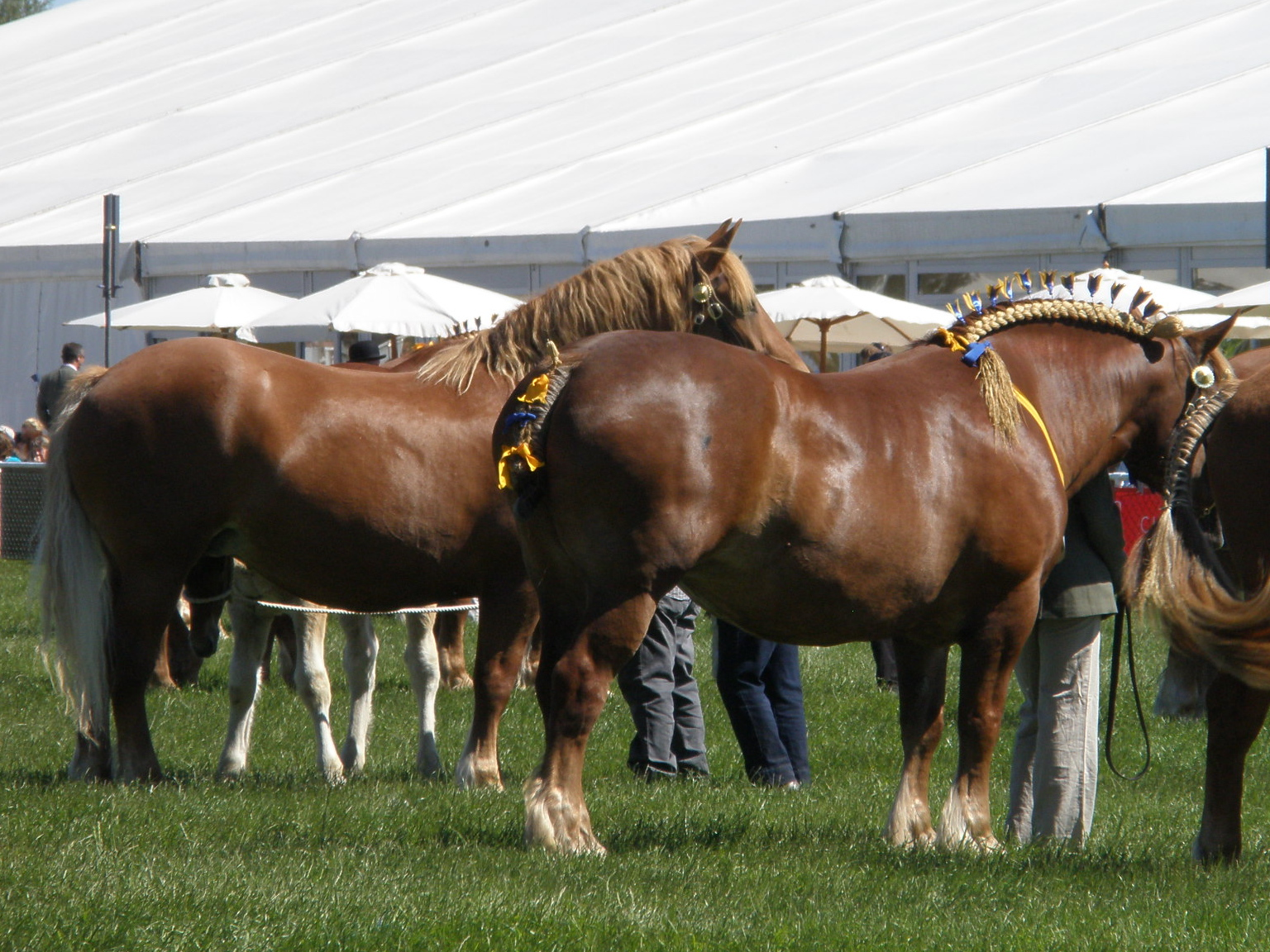
Suffolk Punch horses at Suffolk Show 2010

The Suffolk Show is an annual show that takes place at Trinity Park, on the eastern edge of Ipswich in the Purdis Farm area of the English county of Suffolk. It is organised by the Suffolk Agricultural Association, which was established in 1831 (registered charity no. 288595).

== Cancellations ==
- The Suffolk Show was cut short in 2012 due to high winds, resulting in a loss of at least £500,000 in revenue. The Suffolk show offered refunds to ticket-holders and traders for the cancelled second day, a decision which the show's committee and executive board agreed upon unanimously.
- Due to the COVID-19 pandemic, the Suffolk Show was cancelled in 2020 and 2021. In 2022, it returned with RAF and Army parachute displays, 600 trade stands, and 12 competition rings. The 2022 return of the show also saw a Platinum Jubilee pageant for then British monarch Queen Elizabeth II, where the 588-mile Festival of Suffolk torch relay in honour of which came to an end. The relay was "part of several county-wide events taking place to celebrate the Queen's 70th year as monarch."
