= Aldringham =

Village in Suffolk, England

Coordinates: 52.193878°N 1.578558°E

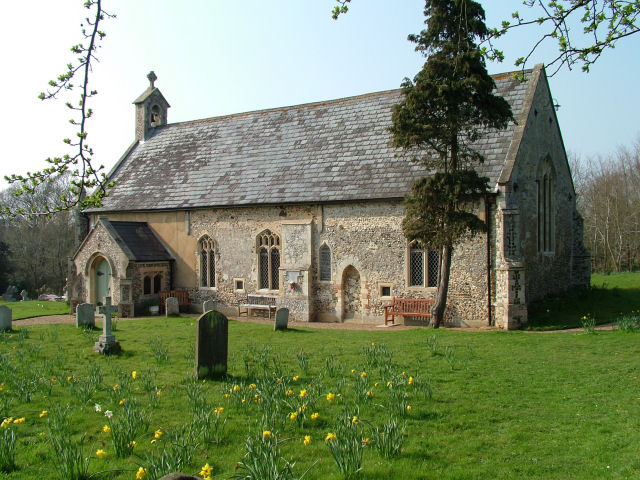
- St Andrew's Church, Aldringham

- Location within Suffolk
- Interactive map of Aldringham
- Population: 800 (Parish)
- OS grid reference: TM4460
- Shire county: Suffolk
- Region: East
- Country: England
- Sovereign state: United Kingdom
- Post town: Leiston
- Postcode district: IP16
- Dialling code: 01728
- Police: Suffolk
- Fire: Suffolk
- Ambulance: East of England
- UK Parliament: Suffolk Coastal

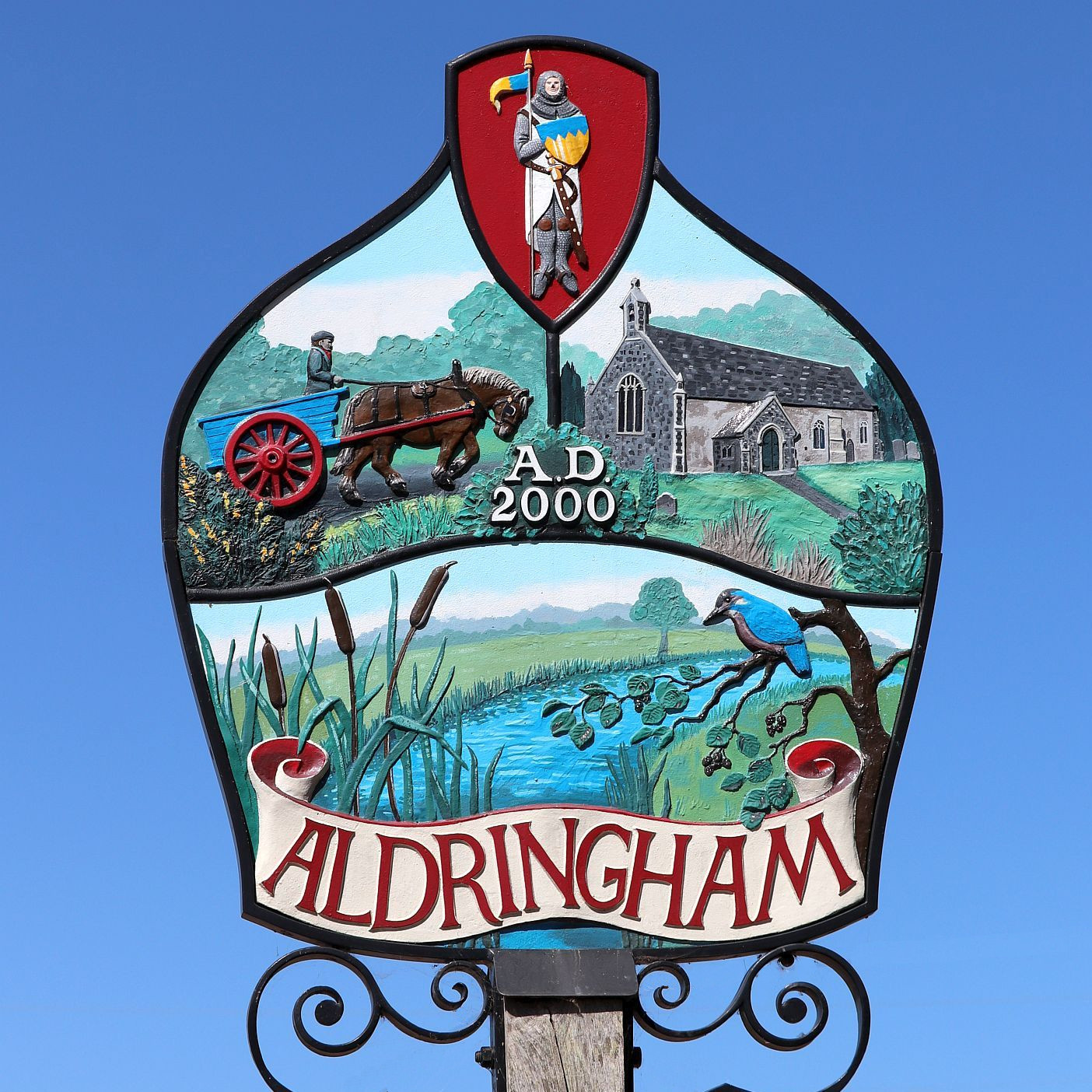
Aldringham Village Sign

Aldringham is a village in the East Suffolk district of Suffolk, England. It is the namesake of the Aldringham cum Thorpe civil parish that it is a part of. The village is located 1 mile (1½ km) south of Leiston and 3 miles (4½ km) northwest of Aldeburgh adjacent to the North Sea coast. The parish includes the coastal village of Thorpeness. The mid-2005 population estimate for Aldringham cum Thorpe parish was 730. By 2022, the parish population rose to 800, as recorded in the mid-2022 population estimate.

== History ==
Formerly in the Blything Hundred, Aldringham is mentioned in the Domesday Book of 1086 as "Alrincham". Its placename derivation is uncertain but Ekwall indicates that it probably means "the village of Ealdhere's people": the similarity to Aldeburgh is coincidental or the result of assimilation.

There is no manor at Aldringham referred to in the Domesday Survey of 1086, but there are two estates mentioned. One, included in the valuation of Leiston, was in the soc of the bishop at Hoxne, and was held as tenant by Robert Malet. This included seven villeins and a bordar, having 90 acres. The other was a holding of 20 acres and half a ploughteam, and was also held by Robert Malet.

=== Manor of Aldringham ===
The manor of Aldringham, and its church (a vicarage), were in the lordship of Ranulf de Glanvill, Chief Justiciar of England to Henry II, who founded the Augustinian Priory of Butley (1171) and the Premonstratensian Abbey at Leiston (c. 1183). Ranulf originally granted the churches of St Margaret at Leiston and St Andrew at Aldringham to Butley Priory, but it was subsequently approved by the first governors of those houses, Gilbert of Butley and Robert of Leiston, that the churches of Leiston and Aldringham be transferred to Leiston Abbey in exchange for their church of Knodishall.

Ranulf's manor in Aldringham, however, remained in his family: W.A. Copinger shows a descent through a supposed son of Ranulf's, William de Glanvill, to William's son Gilbert, to Gilbert's son Sir Ralph de Glanville, and to Sir Ralph's daughter Maud. It then passed by her daughter Sarah's marriage to Sir Robert de Ufford, Justiciar of Ireland (1268–70, 1276–81), whose son Robert (1279–1316) was summoned to Parliament in 1308, and was (by Cecily de Valoines) the father of Sir Robert de Ufford, created 1st Earl of Suffolk in 1337. In this way the manor of Aldringham was attached to the seat of power of the Earls, and later the Dukes, of Suffolk.

Although the last-named Robert was granted the reversion of the manor of Benhall (with its patronage of Butley Priory and Leiston Abbey) in 1337, this did not mature until the death of Eleanor Ferre in 1349, after which the 1st Earl of Suffolk busied himself with the relocation of Leiston Abbey to a new site away from those destabilizing marine inundations to which Minsmere was sometimes exposed. On the failure of the Ufford line, Aldringham manor passed to the de la Poles, and after the attainder and execution of Edmund de la Pole, 3rd Duke of Suffolk in 1513 it reverted to the Crown.

During the early 17th century, King James I granted the rectory of Aldringham (including the neighbouring chapelry of Thorpe), with its tithes, to George Villiers, 1st Duke of Buckingham, who sold it in 1626; in 1640 it was again sold to Daniel Eliab and Matthew Harvey, and to their heirs forever, which heirs were still holding in the early 1700s. In 1792 both the rectory with its tithes, and also the manor, were in the hands of Sir Joshua Vanneck, 3rd Bart., afterwards 1st Baron Huntingfield.

=== Antiquities ===
Brabner's Comprehensive Gazetteer of 1895 states that Aldringham was formerly a market town, and that it "still" had a pleasure-fair on 11 December. This alludes to the "Coldfair" after which Coldfair Green is named.

The oldest secular building in the village is The Parrot and Punchbowl pub, which contains many references to its heavy involvement in smuggling in the two centuries after its opening in the sixteenth century.

Aldringham Windmill was dismantled in 1922 and re-erected in 1923 at Thorpeness.

Aldringham was the home of the poet, artist and architect Cecil Lay, and most of his architectural work is found in or near the village, including Raidsend, some houses on North Warren, and the Providence Baptist Chapel on Aldringham Heath.

== Community ==
The village is dispersed and close to both Leiston and Aldeburgh so has few basic services and community facilities. The village expanded with the construction of a small housing estate in the early 2000s. The grade II listed Parrot and Punchbowl pub is situated in Aldringham and dates back to the late 1500s.

== Notable residents ==
- R. J. Unstead; historian and author
- Michael Walker, Baron Walker of Aldringham; retired Field Marshal
