= House in the Clouds =

Building in Thorpeness, Suffolk, England

Coordinates: 52°10′55″N 1°36′34″E

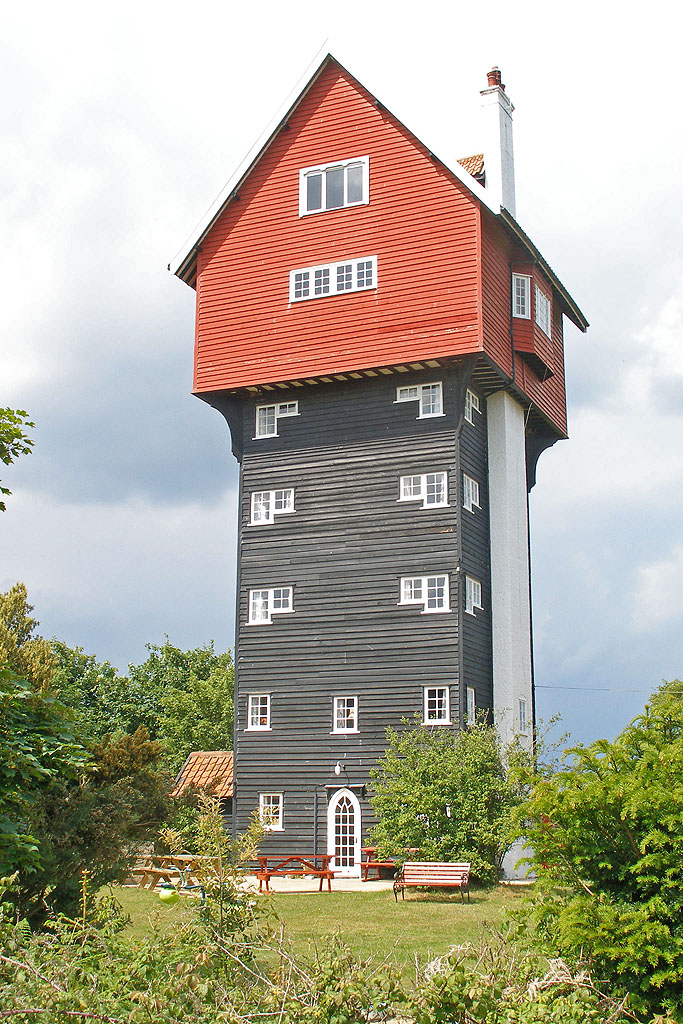
- House in the Clouds

- Location within England

General information
- Location: Thorpeness, Suffolk, England

Website
- Official website

The House in the Clouds is a water tower built to incorporate a residential home, in Thorpeness, Suffolk, England. The structure was built in 1923 to receive water pumped from Thorpeness Windmill, and was designed to improve the looks of the water tower, disguising its tank with the appearance of a weatherboarded building more in keeping with Thorpeness's mock Tudor and Jacobean style, except seeming to float above the trees due to its height.

The original capacity of the water tank was 50,000 imperial gallons (230,000 L) but during the Second World War, the House in the Clouds was accidentally hit by gunfire from anti-aircraft guns based at Thorpeness. The water tank was repaired using its own steel, which resulted in a reduced capacity of 30,000 imperial gallons (140,000 L). In 1977, the water tower was made redundant by a mains water supply to the village, and additional living space was created. In 1979, the main water tank was removed to fully convert the building into a house.

The building currently has five bedrooms and three bathrooms; it contains a total of 85 steps from top to bottom and is around 70 ft (21 m) high.

It has been a Grade II Listed Building since 1995.

== In popular culture ==
The house was featured in the Suffolk programme during series 3 of the Channel 4 television series Homes by the Sea in 2017. It also featured on series 12 of the BBC television series Flog It! on 8 May 2018.

In its book 100 Buildings in 100 Years, The Twentieth Century Society chose it to represent 1924.

== Gallery ==
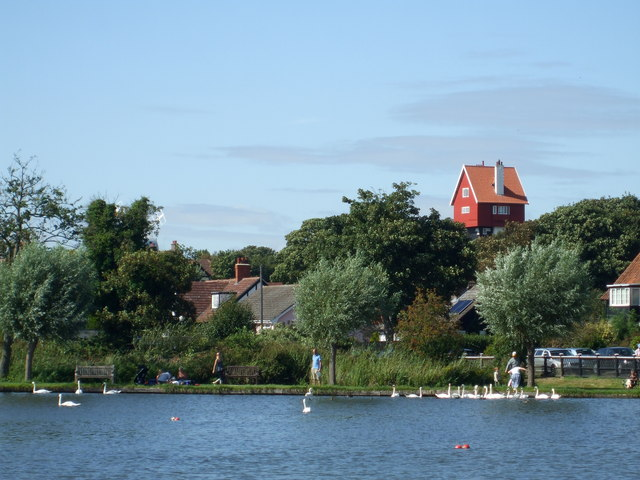
View from across the Meare above the trees
