= Rushmere Common =

Common land in Suffolk, England

Coordinates: 52.06°N 1.21°E

Part of Rushmere Common

Rushmere Common (also Rushmere Heath) is common land situated on the eastern outskirts of Ipswich mainly within the parish of Rushmere St. Andrew, Suffolk, England. It is predominately heathland, gorse and woodland, and hosts a golf course. It adjoins the Sandlings Open Space to the east (which is owned and managed by East Suffolk District Council) and is crossed by a number of footpaths, including the Sandlings Walk – a long-distance footpath which starts on the common and ends 50 miles away in Southwold.

== History ==
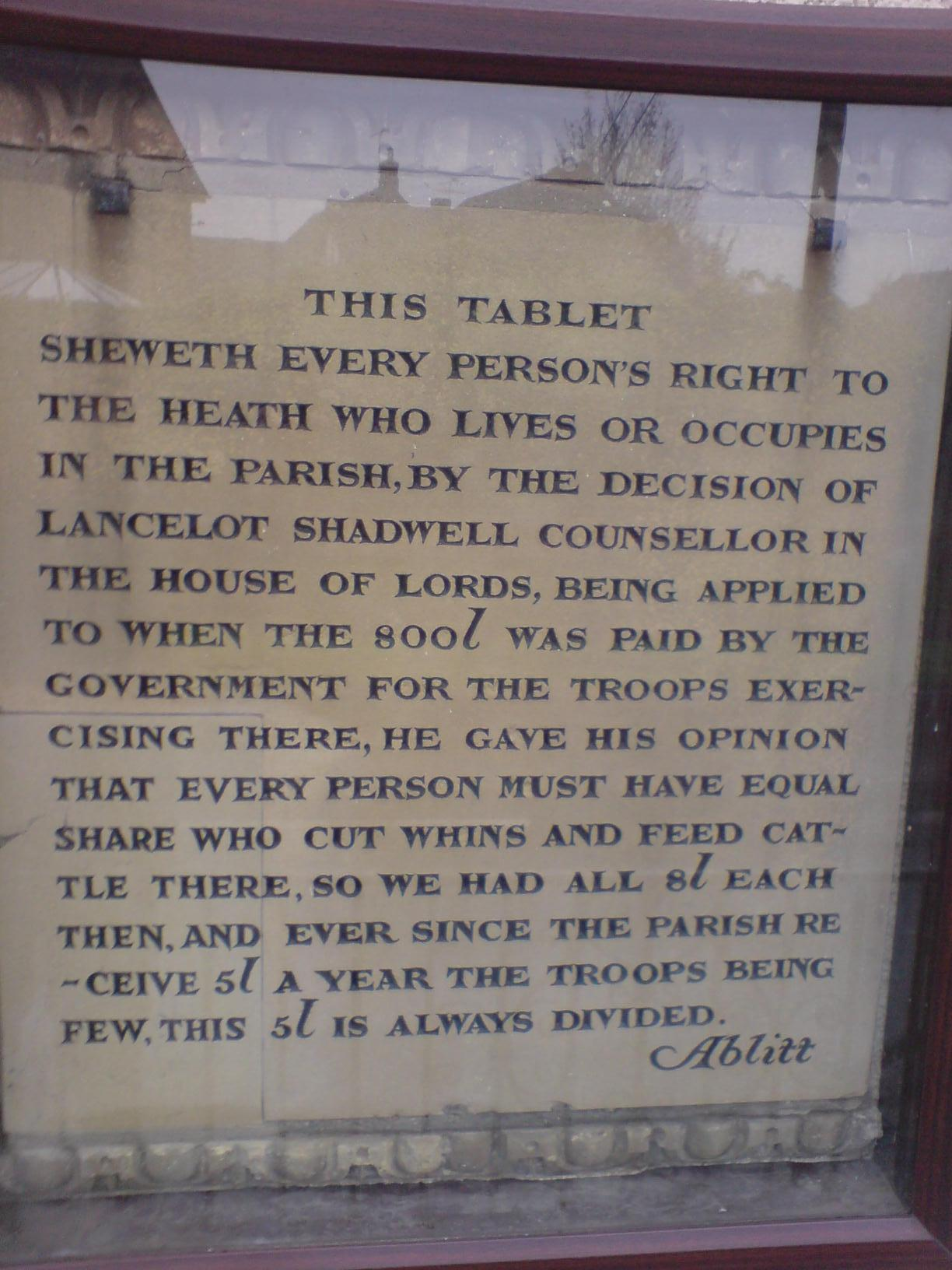
Abblit's tablet

Rushmere Common has probably been common land since the Middle Ages. For at least two hundred years, the ownership of the soil was claimed by one of the local manors. The commoners resisted the claims of the Lord of the manor, the Marquess of Bristol, who tried to prosecute some of them.

It was used as a place of execution, with some one hundred recorded hangings between 1735 and 1797 – most frequently for house breaking and burglary, but also for highway robbery and murder. The heath was frequently used by the army, and in 1804 Sir James Craig had 11,000 men under arms on the common.

Nathanial Abblit championed the commoners' rights and in 1861 he had a stone tablet erected on the outside of his cottage, which after the demolition of the cottage in 1961 was transferred to the wall of the Baptist Chapel and reads:

This tablet sheweth every person's right to the heath who lives or occupies in the parish, by the decision of Lancelot Shadwell Counsellor in the House of Lords, being applied to when the 800l was paid by the government for the troops exercising there, he gave his opinion that every person must have equal share who cut whins and feed cattle there, so we had all 8l each them and ever since the parish receive 5l a year the troops being few, this 5l is always divided. Ablitt

Abblit also abhorred residents of Ipswich being advised by their doctors' to ride their horses on the common. So annoyed was he that he composed this verse:

Pooping on the Heath

You must not poop in Ipswich, for so the doctors say;

You must go onto Rushmere to take the smell away

We are so refined now, your pigs you must not slay

Pigs' blood produces Cholera and turns us all to clay

A Commoners Committee was established to manage the common in 1881. Golf has been played on the common since 1895, first by the Ipswich Golf Club and since 1929 by the Rushmere Golf Club.

In 1958 the title to the land was purchased by the Chairman of the Commoners Committee, for £500, who then sold it to the Commoners for the same price. The title is held in trust by the Trustees and the conduct of the Commoners' affairs is regulated by the Trust Deed. In 1967 the common was registered as a common under the Commons Registration Act. After that time, all commoners' rights not registered by individual commoners were lost.

== Management ==
Day-to-day management of the common is performed by the Commoners Committee, which has nine members, of whom three are elected at each Annual General Meeting. Anyone who has resided in the ancient parish of Rushmere St Andrew for twelve months or more can vote, although only one vote per household is allowed. The committee is supported by a clerk and a warden. The warden patrol the common on most days and keep a watching brief on the area in general and the clerk deals with the correspondence and record keeping as well as the financial accounts.

== Rights of way ==
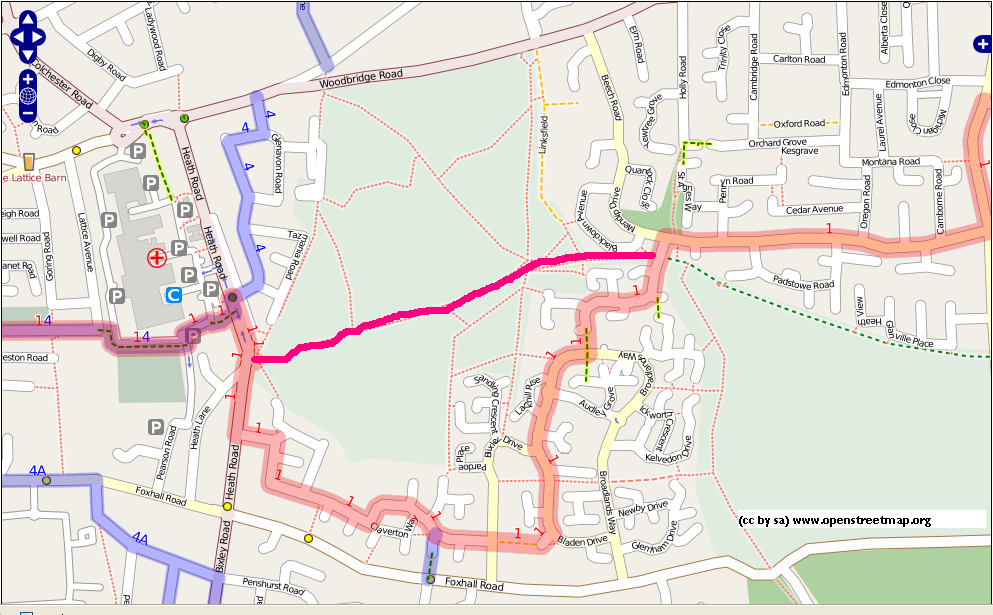
Cycle ways on the common

There are a number of paths across the common, one of which forms part of the Sandlings Walk. These paths are used by local people for leisure and also by walkers and cyclists as a traffic-free route to the hospital, Ipswich station, Ipswich Town Centre, BT Research at Martlesham, Kesgrave, Grange Farm and a number of local schools.

The path to Grange Farm and beyond to the east of the common is a bridleway and cycling is allowed, but the path across the common is legally a footpath so cyclists should dismount. Although people have cycled across Rushmere Common for at least 70 years, the route cannot be shown on maps or signposted and the surface is not well maintained. It is also very dangerous as the footpaths are crossed by several of the golf holes and fast moving cyclists may not be seen by golfers easily.

Sustrans wanted National Cycle Route 1 (NCR 1) to cross the common but were forced to make a detour to the south to avoid the area. The only other option that allows cyclists to cross the width of the common on an east–west axis without entering the common itself is cycling along the A1214 (Woodbridge Road) to the north; however, this does not have enough width for either an on-road cycle-lane or a shared-use path without a strip of land from the common.

An alternative proposal has been to improve the route across the middle of the common and proposals to date have included both a paved cycle-track and the conversion of the footpath to a bridleway with a loose surface. Suffolk County Council requested a strip of land to the south of the A1214 to create a segregated cycle-path, but this was refused by the Commoners Committee. The county council are now requesting that the main east–west footpath be upgraded to a bridleway. This again is objected to by the Commoners Committee for safety reasons and to help protect the habitat. It is recognised that encouraging cycling on the common will have a detrimental effect on wildlife especially if cyclists are looking for more of a challenge and detour from the footpaths.
