= Stour Valley Path =

Long-distance footpath in Suffolk, England

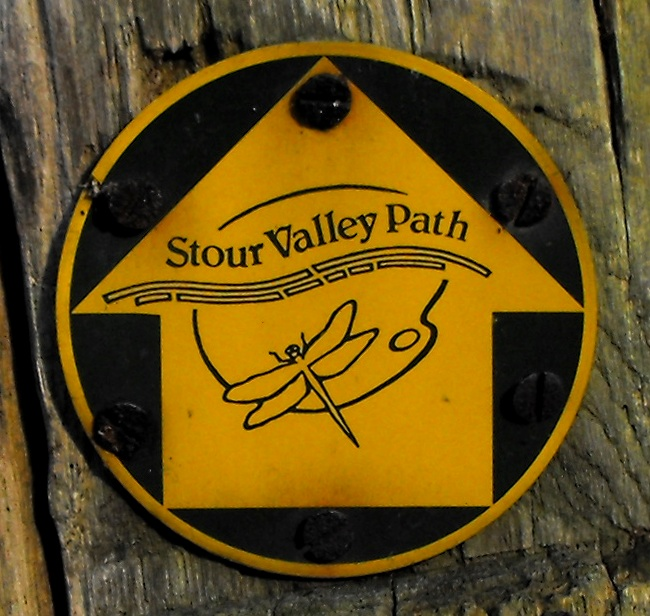

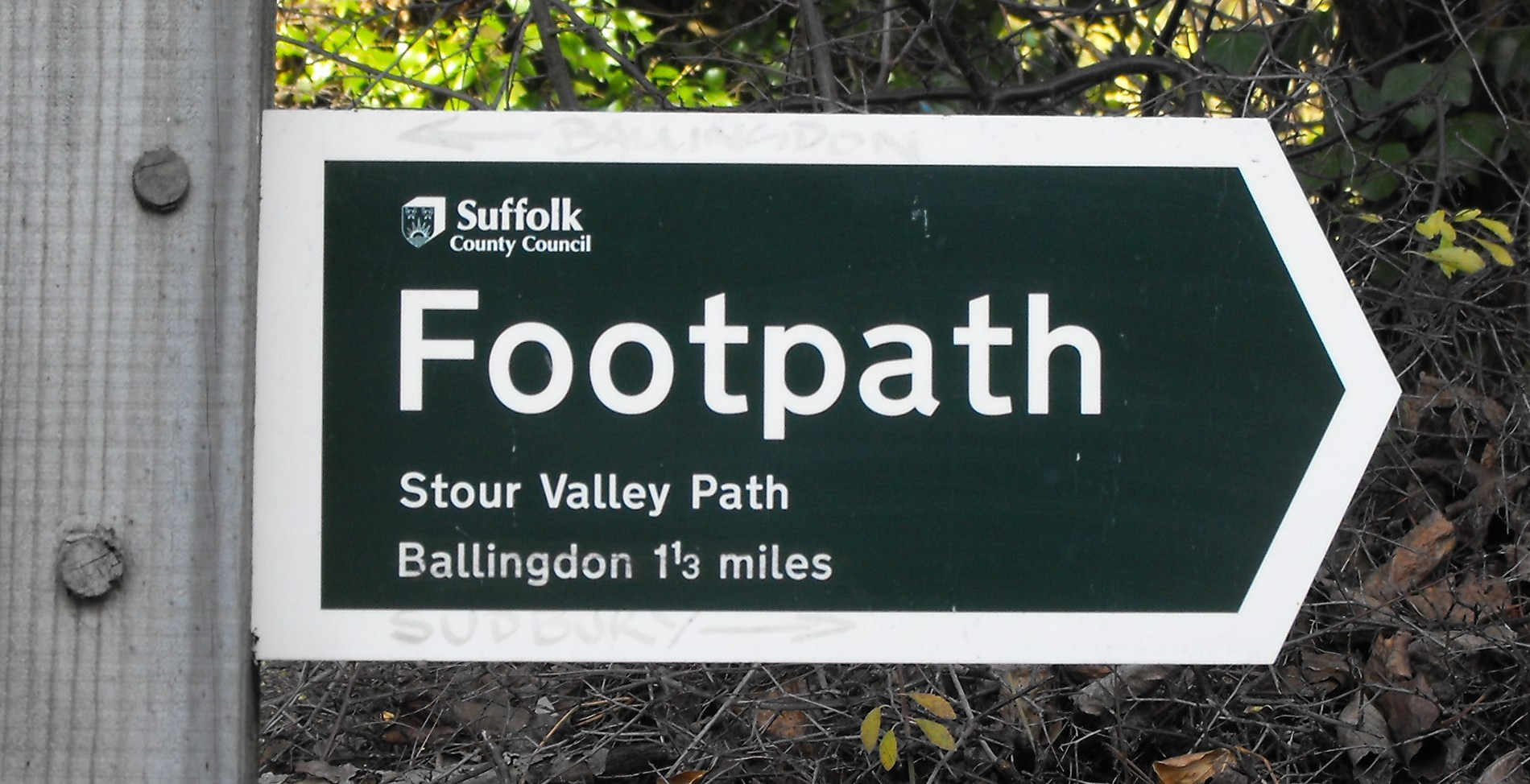

The Stour Valley Path is a 96-kilometre (60 mi) long-distance footpath in Suffolk, England, connecting Newmarket (52.2407°N 0.3976°E) with Cattawade (51.9570°N 1.0563°E), a nature reserve near Manningtree.

The path follows the catchment area of the River Stour. The majority of the route forms part of European Path E2. It connects with the Icknield Way Path, St Edmund Way, the Stour and Orwell Walk and the Essex Way.
