= Ipswich Golf Club =

Members club in Suffolk, England

Coordinates: 52.0408°N 1.2142°E

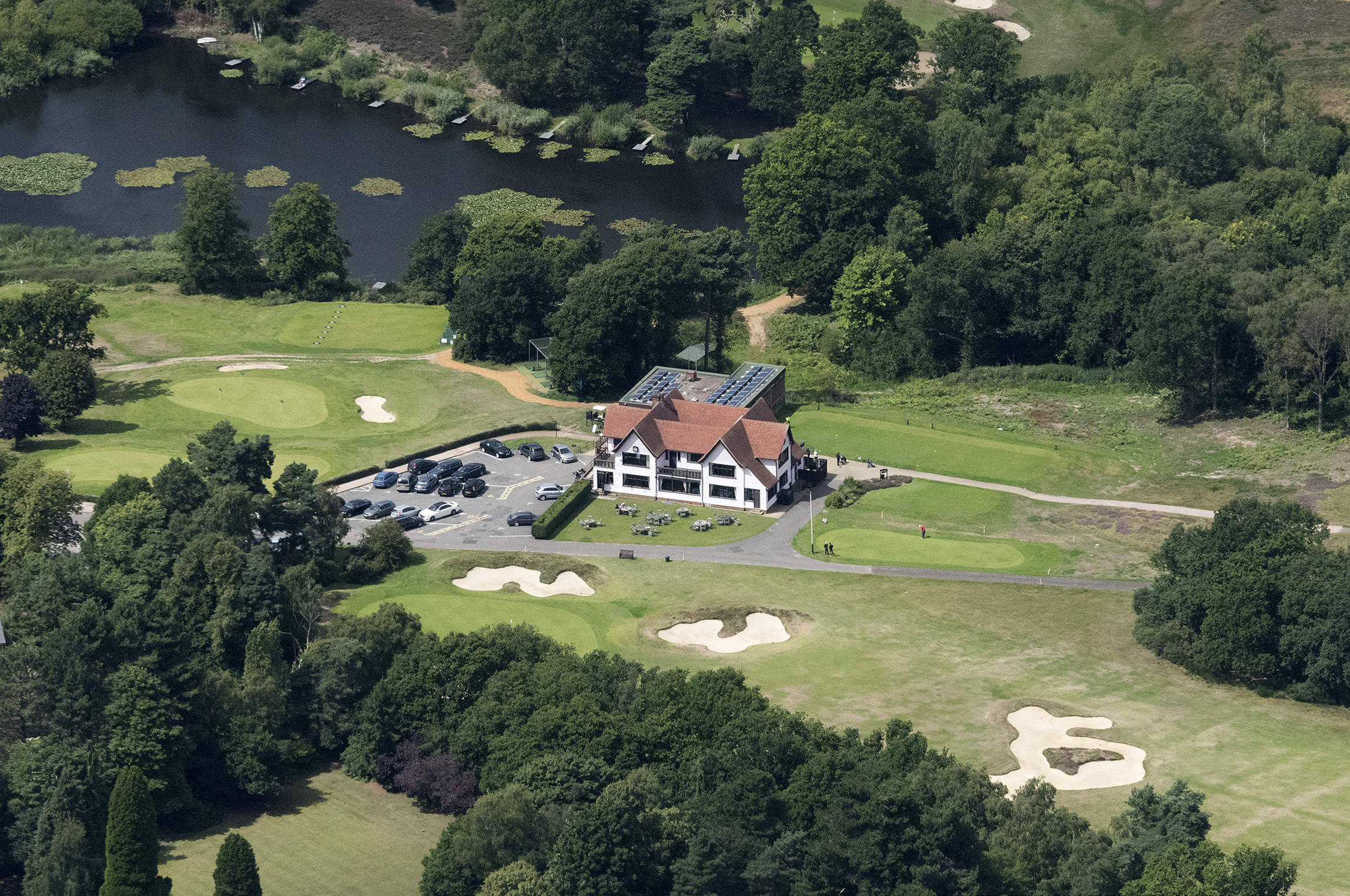
Ipswich Golf Club from the air, July 2017

Ipswich Golf Club is a members club based in Ipswich, Suffolk. It maintains the Purdis Heath course.

The club was founded in 1895 with its original course on common land, part of Rushmere Common. However it was not until 1928 that the Purdis Heath course was opened. The course was designed by James Braid.

The course is 6,431 yards long with a par of 71.

The club hosted the Ladies' British Open Amateur Stroke Play Championship twice, in 1973 when Anne Stant won with Mary Everard as runner up and in 1987 when it was won by Linda Bayman with Jill Thornhill and Nicola Way as runners-up.
