= Doug Lapwood =

New Zealand footballer

Personal information
- Full name: Douglas J Lapwood
- Place of birth: New Zealand

Senior career*
Years	Team	Apps	(Gls)
- Eastern Union

International career
1958	New Zealand	5	(0)
- * Club domestic league appearances and goals

Doug Lapwood is a former association football player who represented New Zealand at international level.

Lapwood made his full All Whites debut in a 3–2 loss to Australia on 18 August 1958 and ended his international playing career with five A-international caps to his credit, his final cap an appearance in a 2–1 win over New Caledonia on 14 September 1958.
