= Sizewell =

English fishing village and nuclear reactor site

Coordinates: 52.207°N 1.620°E

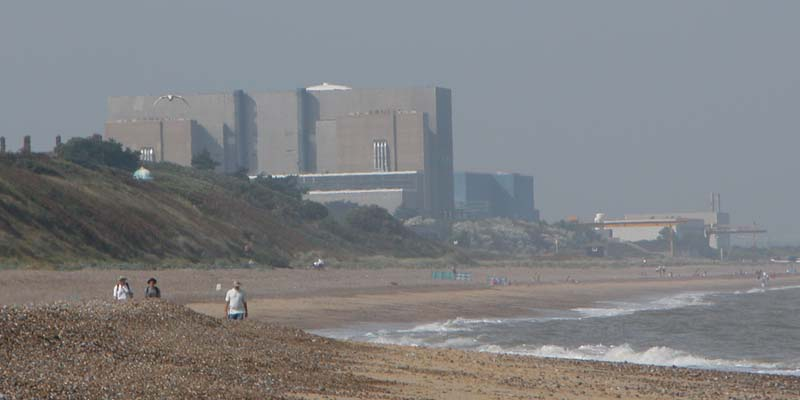
- View towards the Sizewell power stations along the beach

- Location within Suffolk
- Civil parish: Leiston
- District: East Suffolk
- Shire county: Suffolk
- Region: East
- Country: England
- Sovereign state: United Kingdom
- Post town: Leiston
- Postcode district: IP16
- Dialling code: 01728
- UK Parliament: Suffolk Coastal

Sizewell is an English fishing hamlet in the East Suffolk district of Suffolk, England. It belongs to the civil parish of Leiston and lies on the North Sea coast just north of the larger holiday village of Thorpeness, between the coastal towns of Aldeburgh and Southwold. It is 2 miles (3.2 km) east of the town of Leiston and belongs within the Suffolk Coast and Heaths AONB. It is the site of two nuclear power stations, one of them still active. A third nuclear power station, Sizewell C, received its Final Investment Decision on 22 July 2025, when the UK Energy Secretary signed a multi-billion-pound agreement formally approving the project's construction.

== Nuclear power stations ==
The village is the location of two separate nuclear power stations, the Magnox Sizewell A and pressurised water reactor (PWR) Sizewell B, which are readily visible to the north of the village. Sizewell A is being decommissioned, having ceased to generate electricity in 2006. The decommissioning process is expected to take until 2027 to complete, with the site not expected to be cleared until 2098. Plans to build a third nuclear power station at the site progressed over subsequent years. In October 2021, the government introduced the Regulated Asset Base (RAB) model as a funding mechanism for the project. On 22 July 2025, UK Energy Secretary Ed Miliband signed the Final Investment Decision for Sizewell C, formally approving the project at a capital cost of around £38 billion at 2024 prices. The UK government took an initial 44.9% equity stake, becoming the largest single shareholder, alongside private investors including EDF, Centrica, La Caisse, and Amber Infrastructure. Once operational, the plant is projected to supply electricity equivalent to the needs of six million homes for at least 60 years.

"Welcome to Sizewell, twinned with Chernobyl" was a slogan used by anti-nuclear campaigners.

== Sizewell Marshes ==
Sizewell Marshes form a 260-acre (105.4-ha) biological Site of Special Scientific Interest on the edge of Sizewell, in the Suffolk Coast and Heaths Area of Outstanding Natural Beauty. They are part of a 356-acre (144-ha) nature reserve managed by the Suffolk Wildlife Trust as Sizewell Belts. It is noted for its rare invertebrates and bird species, and as one of the main wetlands in East Anglia for wild flowers.

== History ==
=== The hall ===
The village became the nucleus of the Ogilvie estate in 1859. It extended as far south as Aldeburgh. Sizewell Hall, now used as a Christian conference centre, is still owned by the Ogilvie family. From the end of the war up to the summer of 1955 it housed a mixed, semi-progressive prep school attended, among others, by the theatre critic and biographer Sheridan Morley.

=== Lifeboat ===
The Suffolk Humane Society provided a number of lifeboats along the coast of Suffolk where shallow water and sand banks create navigation problems for ships approaching harbours. One was stationed at 'Sizewell Gap' from 1826 until 1851 when it was moved to Aldeburgh. The Plenty-class lifeboat was 24 ft (7.3 m) long and equipped for 8 oars.

=== Wartime ===
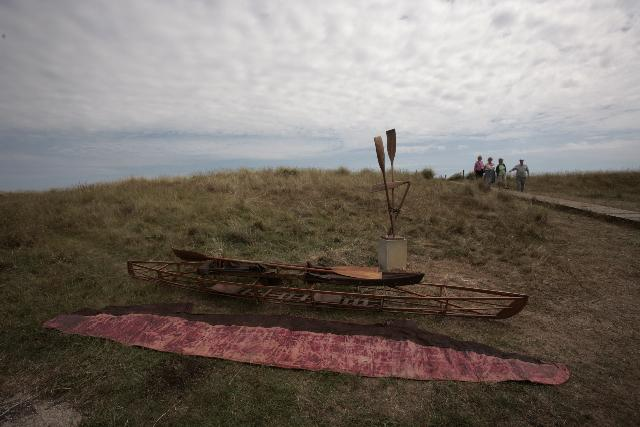
Monument to 32 Engelandvaarders on Sizewell beach

The beach at Sizewell was the landing site of Henri Peteri and his brother Willem in September 1941. The brothers left the Dutch town of Katwijk in a collapsible canoe on a journey that took 56 hours. Those who escaped occupied Holland were known as Engelandvaarders. About 1,700 Engelandvaarders reached England, including about 200 who crossed the North Sea; 32 men tried to make a canoe trip like the Peteri brothers, but only eight succeeded in reaching the English coast.

In 2005, Henri Peteri commissioned a memorial to the men who made the journey across the North Sea by canoe, consisting of a pair of crossed kayak oars and a broken paddle that commemorates those who did not survive the trip. In June 2009, the monument was unveiled by his widow on Sizewell Beach, together with the original kayak.

An inscription on the broken paddle reads:

In memory of the thirty-two young Dutchmen who tried to escape to England by kayak during World War II to join the Allied Forces. Eight of them reached the English coast. Only three survived the war. The last living survivor dedicated this memorial to his brothers in arms who were less fortunate. He reached England – and freedom – on this beach on 21 September 1941.

=== Historical writings ===
In 1870–1872, John Marius Wilson's Imperial Gazetteer of England and Wales described the hamlet as

SIZEWELL, a hamlet in Leiston parish, Suffolk; on the coast, at S. Gap, 6 miles E of Saxmundham. It contains some recent marine villa residences; has a coastguard station and a fishery; and ranks as a chapelry, annexed to Leiston. S. Bank is a shoal lying off the hamlet; measures 6 miles by ¾; and has from 4 to 9 fathoms water.

In 1887, John Bartholomew wrote a shorter description of Sizewell in his Gazetteer of the British Isles:

Sizewell, coast hamlet, Leiston par., Suffolk, 6 miles E. of Saxmundham; Sizewell Bank, shoal, is 6 miles long and 5 mile broad.

== Facilities ==
Sizewell retains a few basic services associated with tourism, including a refreshment kiosk and a public house, the Vulcan Arms. A handful of fishing boats operate from the beach.
