= North Warren RSPB reserve =

RSPB nature reserve in Suffolk, England

North Warren
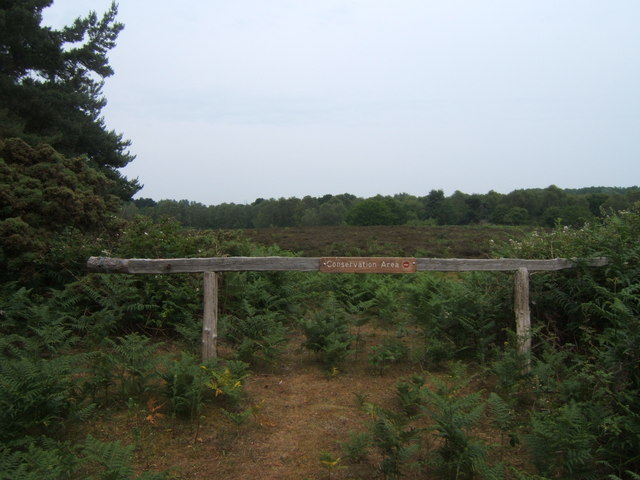
- North Warren RSPB reserve

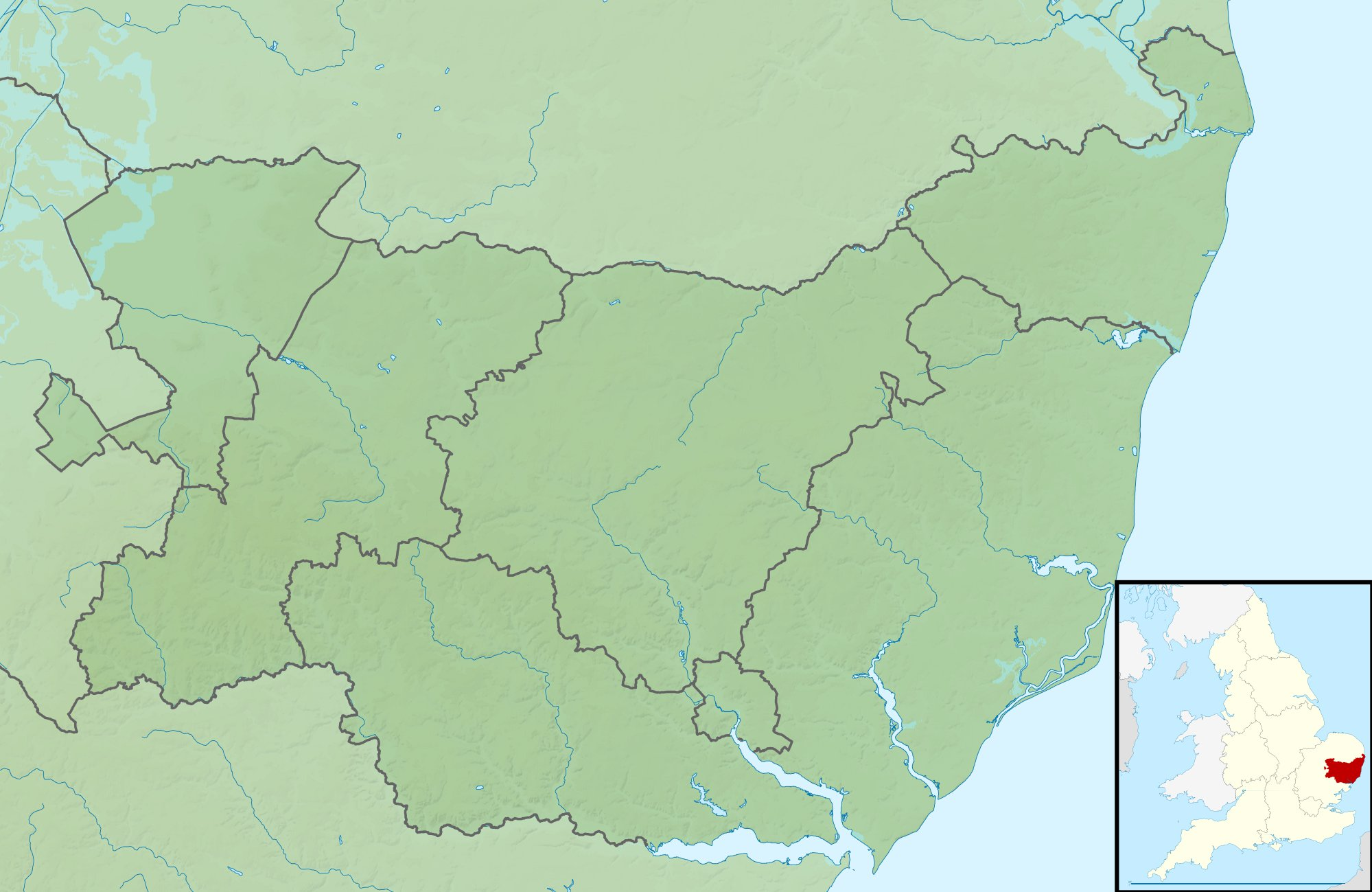
- Location within Suffolk
- Location: Suffolk, East of England, England
- Coordinates: 52°10′05″N 01°36′13″E
- Area: 4.43 km^{2} (1.71 sq mi)
- Established: 1939
- Operator: Royal Society for the Protection of Birds
- Website: RSPB Reserves - North Warren

North Warren RSPB reserve is a nature reserve run by the Royal Society for the Protection of Birds (RSPB) in Suffolk, England. It lies on the Suffolk coast on the north edge of the town of Aldeburgh and to the south of Thorpeness and includes the Aldringham Walks area of heathland to the north. It is within the Suffolk Coast and Heaths Area of Outstanding Natural Beauty (AONB) and the Suffolk Heritage Coast area. Noted for its populations of Eurasian bittern, European nightjar and other bird species, it covers a range of coastal habitats and is protected with SSSI, SPA conservation status.

== Ecology ==
The 4.43 square kilometres (1.71 sq mi) site covers a mix of coastal habitats, with areas of grassland, lowland heath, reed bed, shingle, dune and woodland. Rare shingle flora such as sea pea, sea kale, sea holly and yellow horned-poppy can be found at North Warren. Key conservation bird species found at the site include Eurasian bittern, European nightjar, nightingale and western marsh harrier.

It is also an important over wintering site for wildfowl including large numbers of Eurasian wigeon, common teal and a flock of greater white-fronted geese. In 2007, three marsh harrier chicks fledged from three nests and seven nightjars, 23 pairs of woodlark, seven pairs of Dartford warbler and three booming bitterns were recorded.

Mammals found at the site include European otter, European water vole, European badger and European rabbit, and small numbers of red deer and muntjac can be seen. The reptiles adder, slow-worm and common lizard are present in heath areas, while the amphibians common frog, common toad, smooth newt and palmate newt can be found in wetland areas.

Many insect species can be found at North Warren, with large numbers of dragonfly and butterfly in summer months (Northern Hemisphere), including the nationally rare silver-studded blue. In 2007, an invasive insect pest, the wheat bug Nysius huttoni, was found at North Warren for the first time in the UK. Originally from New Zealand the insect feeds on weeds and crop plants and has since been found at other sites in the UK.

== Conservation ==
=== Protected status ===
It is protected with Site of Special Scientific Interest status as part of the 'Leiston - Aldeburgh' SSSI. Parts of the reserve are also covered by the 'Sandlings' Special Protection Area (SPA). It also lies within the Suffolk Coast and Heaths Area of Outstanding Natural Beauty (AONB) and the Suffolk Heritage Coast area.

== Access and facilities ==
North Warren can be accessed from the road between Aldeburgh and Thorpness. Bus service 64 travels between Aldeburgh and Saxmundham. The nearest railway station is in Saxmundham 6 miles (9.7 km) away and the Suffolk Coast Cycle route passes nearby. The long-distance walks, the Suffolk Coast Path and Sandlings Walk cross the reserve.

The reserve is open year-round with no fee and provides no additional facilities, there is a nearby pay and display car park and public toilets in Aldeburgh. The trails within the reserve are unpaved and may be unsuitable for wheelchair and buggy users, however much of the reed beds are viewable from the paved path alongside the road next to the reserve. Dogs, other than assistance dogs are only allowed on the public rights of way.

== History ==
The original North Warren reserve comprising 37 hectares (91 acres) was purchased by the RSPB in 1939 due to interest in its breeding bird populations. In subsequent years the reserve has expanded as land has become available for purchase and now covers 443 hectares (1,090 acres). During World War II, pillboxes and trenches were constructed on the heath and tank traps were placed across the marshes as part of the British coastal defences.
