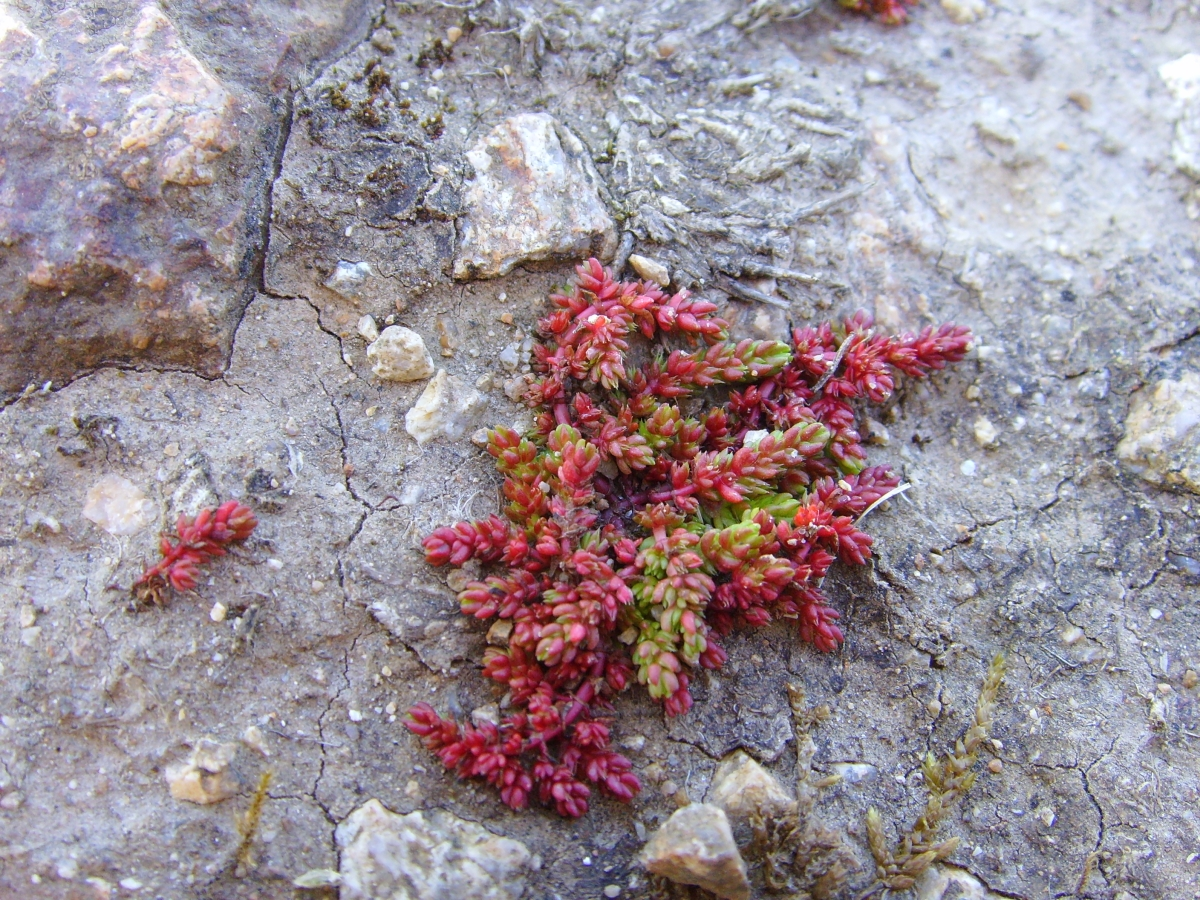

Conservation status
- Least Concern (IUCN 3.1)

Scientific classification
- Kingdom: Plantae
- Clade: Tracheophytes
- Clade: Angiosperms
- Clade: Eudicots
- Order: Saxifragales
- Family: Crassulaceae
- Genus: Crassula
- Species: C. tillaea

Binomial name
- Crassula tillaea Lester-Garland

Synonyms
- Crassula mucosa Tillaea mucosa

= Crassula tillaea =

Mossy stonecrop

Species of succulent

Crassula tillaea is a succulent plant known by its common names mossy stonecrop and moss pygmyweed. It is a small fleshy plant growing only a few centimeters in height. It is green when new and gradually turns orange and then deep red when mature. It has tiny triangular pointed leaves only a few millimeters long. A tiny flower or pair of flowers grows between each oppositely-arranged pair of leaves; the flowers are about two millimeters in length and width. The fruit is a minute follicle containing one or two seeds. This plant is native to Eurasia, particularly the Mediterranean Basin, but is known in other regions as an introduced species.
