= Jacob Larwood =

Dutch non-fiction author

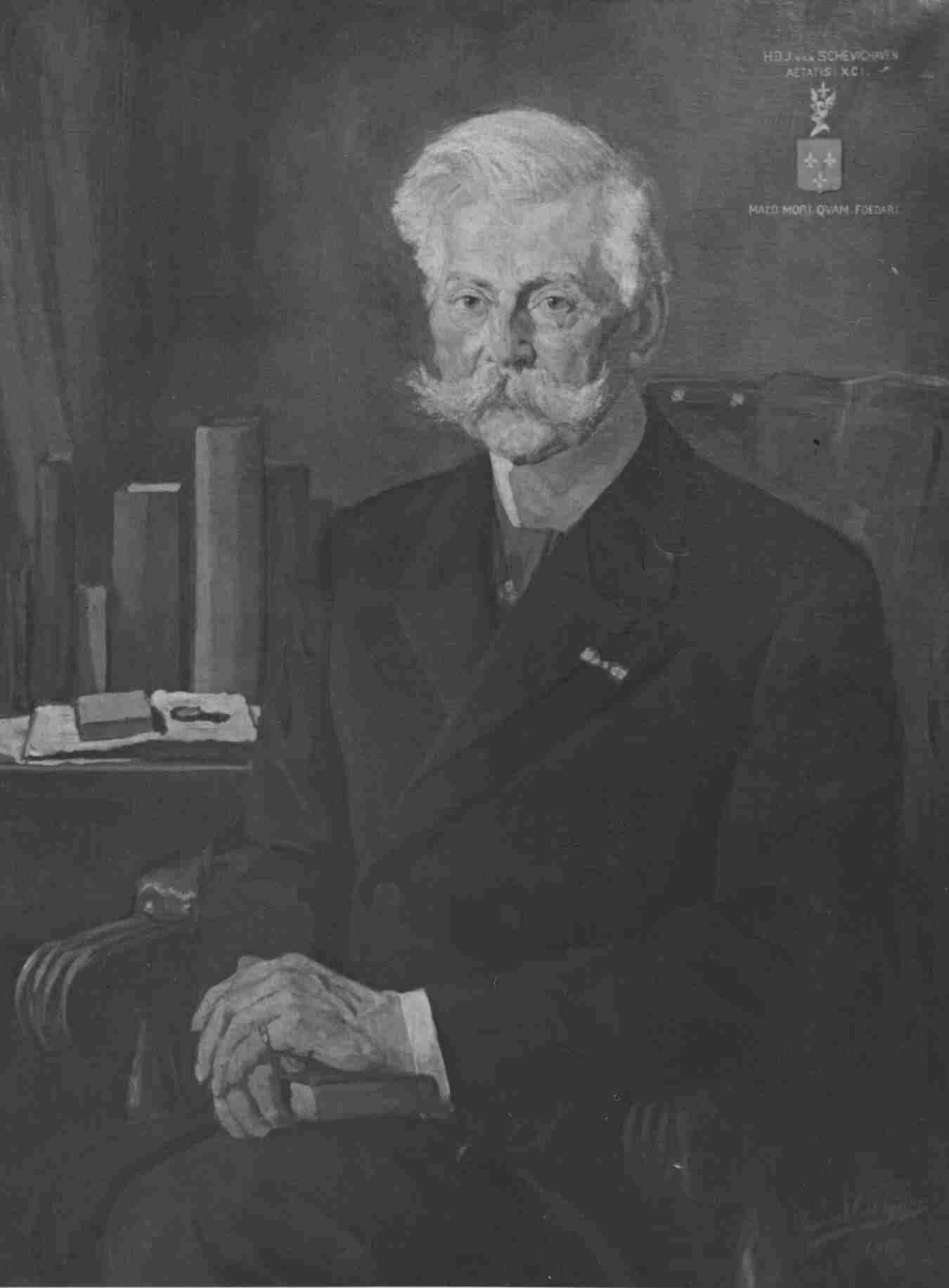
Herman Diederik Johan van Schevichaven in 1918

Herman Diederik Johan van Schevichaven (14 October 1826 – 1918) who wrote as Jacob Larwood, was a Dutch non-fiction author.

== Selected publications ==
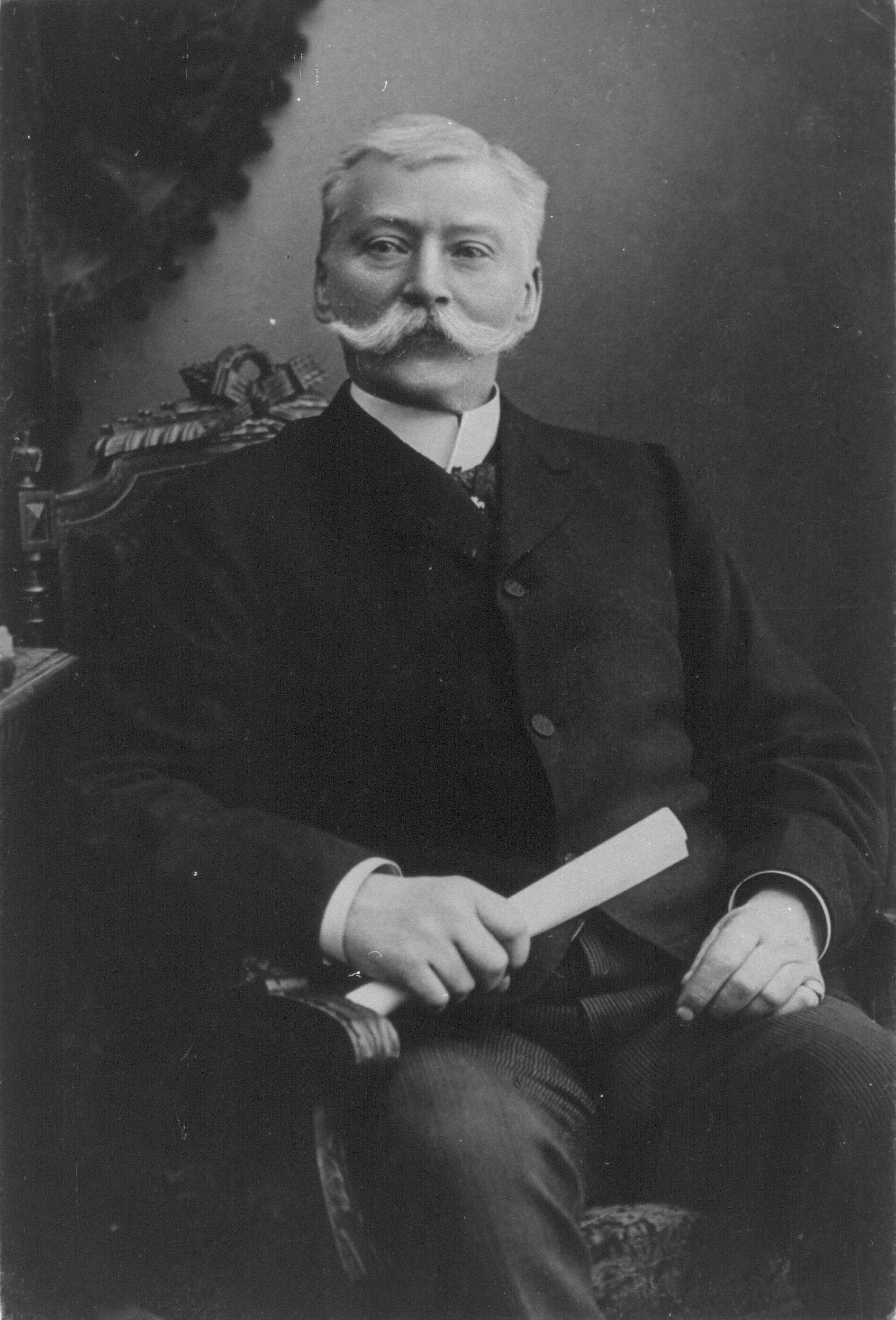
Van Schevichaven (1908)

=== Dutch ===
- Bijdragen tot eene geschiedenis der Bataven met kaarten, Leiden, 1875.
- Epigraphie der Bataafsche krijgslieden in de Romeinsche legers

=== English ===
- The History of Signboards, From the Earliest Times to the Present Day. John Camden Hotten, London, 1866.
- The Book of Clerical Anecdotes: A gathering from many sources of the antiquities, humours, and eccentricities of "the cloth". J. C. Hotten, London, 1871.
- The Story of the London Parks. J. C. Hotten, London, 1872.
- Theatrical Anecdotes, or Fun and Curiosities of the Play, the Playhouse, and the Players. Chatto and Windus, London, 1882.
- Forensic Anecdotes or Humour and Curiosities of the Law and of the Men of Law. Chatto & Windus, London, 1882.
