= Thorpeness =

Seaside village in East Suffolk, England

Coordinates: 52.179333°N 1.614710°E

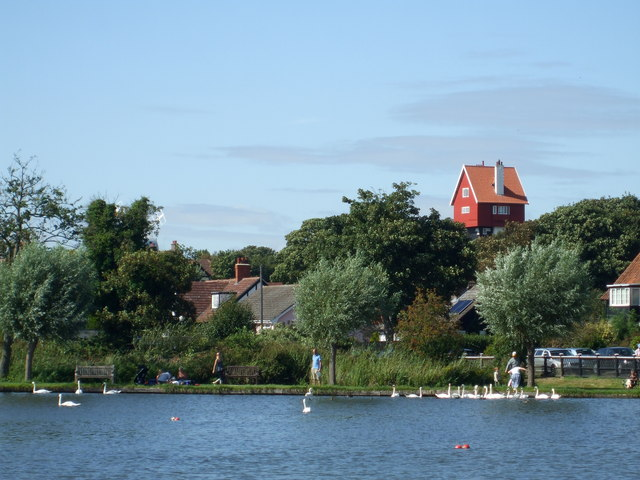
- Thorpeness Meare

- Location within Suffolk
- Shire county: Suffolk
- Region: East
- Country: England
- Sovereign state: United Kingdom
- Post town: Leiston
- Postcode district: IP16
- Dialling code: 01728

Thorpeness is a seaside village in the East Suffolk district of Suffolk, England, which developed in the early twentieth century into an exclusive resort, which it remains today. It belongs to the parish of Aldringham cum Thorpe and lies within the Suffolk Coast and Heaths AONB.

== Development ==
For the earlier history of Thorpe, see Aldringham-cum-Thorpe.

The village was a small fishing hamlet originating in the late nineteenth century, with folk tales of it being a route for smugglers into East Anglia. There is a history of smuggling associated with the Parrot and Punchbowl public house in Aldringham. The Suffolk Humane Society opened Thorpeness Lifeboat Station in 1853. It was transferred to the Royal National Lifeboat Institution in 1855 but closed in 1900.

The landowning Ogilvie family began to buy into the area in 1859. In 1910, Glencairn Stuart Ogilvie, a Scottish barrister whose father had made a fortune building railways around the world, increased the family's local estates to cover the entire area from north of Aldeburgh to past Sizewell, up the coast and inland to Aldringham and Leiston.Most of this land was used for farming, but Ogilvie developed Thorpeness into an elite private fantasy holiday resort, to which he invited his friends' and colleagues' families during the summer months. An exclusive country club with tennis courts, a swimming pool, clubhouse; a golf club designed by the eminent James Braid with its own club house; and many holiday homes were built in Jacobean and Tudor Revival styles. Thorpeness railway station, provided by the Great Eastern Railway to serve what was expected to be an expanding resort, was opened a few days before the outbreak of World War I. It was little used, except by golfers, and closed in 1966.

A notable feature of the village is a set of almshouses built in the 1920s to the design of W. G. Wilson. To hide the eyesore of having a water tower in the village, the tank built in 1923 was clad in wood to make it look like a small house on top of a five-storey tower, with a separate mill next to it, which pumped water to it. It is known as the "House in the Clouds", and after mains water was installed in the village, the old tank was transformed into a huge games room with views over the land from Aldeburgh to Sizewell. A second water tower, reminiscent of a castle tower, is at West Bar, opposite the Country Club, and also had its tank removed to make room for an impressive party hall at the top of the building. West Bar tower has, as of March 2026, been refurbished into luxury holiday accommodation.

For three generations Thorpeness remained mostly in the private ownership of the Ogilvie family, with houses only being sold from the estate to friends as holiday homes. In 1972, Alexander Stuart Ogilvie, Glencairn Stuart Ogilvie's grandson, died on the Thorpeness Golf Course. Many of the houses and the golf course and country club had to be sold to pay death duties. The Ogilvie family sold land for the Sizewell nuclear development, which continues to affect the area with the current development of the Sizewell C nuclear plant.

== The Meare ==
An artificial boating lake known as the Meare was created where there had once been an Elizabethan shipping haven that had silted up. Many of the inspirations for the Meare came from a personal friend of the Ogilvies, J. M. Barrie, who wrote Peter Pan. Along with a large main pond, there are several channels with landings marked with names from the Peter Pan stories. Tiny islands on the Meare contain locations found in the novel, such as the pirates' lair, Wendy's house, and many others, where children are encouraged to play. The Meare was dug to a shallow depth for safety reasons.

A variety of boats can be rented to enjoy the water, many of them originals dating from the creation of the Meare and named by the local workmen who had dug the lake. In August, the Meare serves as the location for the Thorpeness Regatta, which has been held since 1913.

== Thorpeness today ==
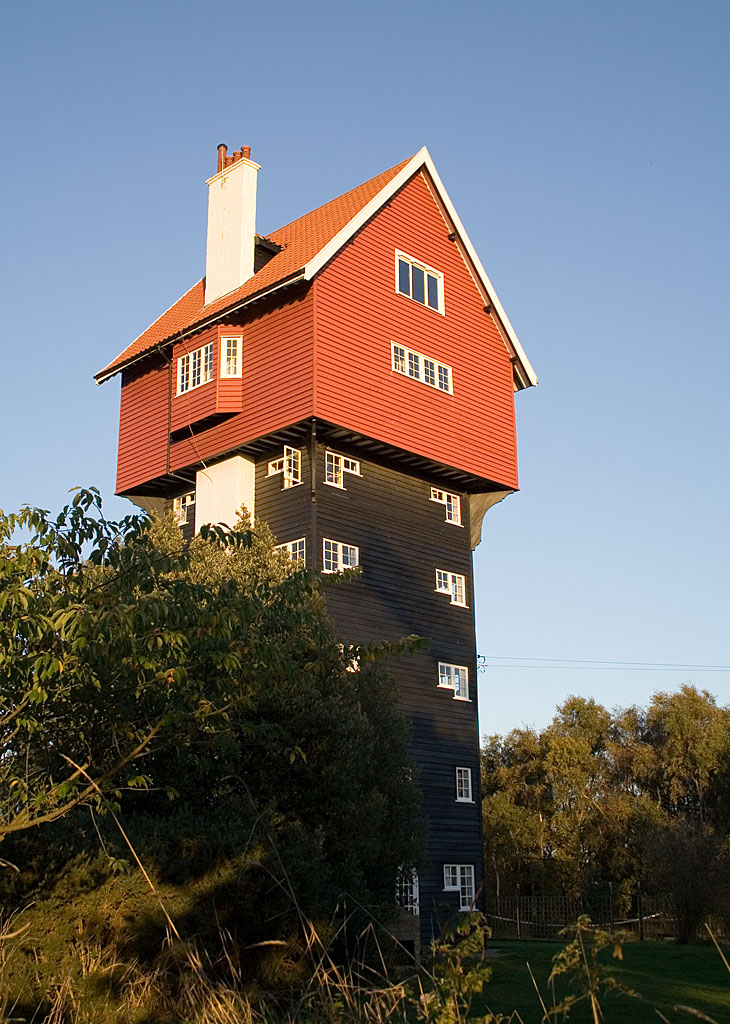
The House in the Clouds is an unusual house, constructed as one of the exclusive resort's two water towers in 1923.

To the south of the village lies the North Warren RSPB reserve, an area of wildlife and habitat conservation and nature trails run by the Royal Society for the Protection of Birds. It has Site of Special Scientific Interest (SSSI) and Special Protection Area (SPA) status.

Like much of Britain's East Coast, Thorpeness has had intermittent problems with coastal erosion, with one house demolished in 2022 due to the encroaching sea, two in late 2025 and another in early 2026. Discussions are still underway for further defences.

A number of power projects, such as cables landing from offshore wind power farms, connector cables such as SeaLink and the construction of Sizewell C are underway in the area. Some of these, specifically the landing of the power cable from ScottishPower's offshore projects and SeaLink are affecting Thorpeness directly. They are all generating significant local opposition, led by Suffolk Energy Action Solutions.

== In popular culture ==
The 1929 ghost story "Rats" by M. R. James is set in Thorpeness.

A lifeboat crew from Thorpeness rescues Tim and his friend the sea captain in the Edward Ardizzone book Little Tim and the Brave Sea Captain (1936).

== World War II ==
- Radar: A radar installation was located in Thorpeness, Chain Home Extra Low Station K164.
- Coastal artillery: a lone 18-pounder field gun was sited in a concrete gun emplacement on the cliffs of Thorpeness. The gun was given the name John, while others elsewhere on the coast were named Matthew, Mark, Luke (for the four evangelists) and St Peter.
- Anti-aircraft artillery.
- SS Magdapur fell victim to a mine and sank close inshore off Thorpeness.
- In the run-up to the Second World War, a small British merchant vessel named Thorpeness was sunk by a torpedo fired by German forces off Spain.
- An anti-tank ditch ran from Aldringham to the Meare. This was dug by the 9th Battalion of the Cameronians.
- One regiment of the 1st Assault Brigade Royal Engineers arrived in Thorpeness in late 1943 and was stationed there.
- A detachment of 2711 Squadron, RAF Regiment, was stationed in Thorpeness, as was 2783 Squadron RAF Regiment.
- The Archaeological Service of Suffolk County Council produced a detailed report of the Second World War and other archaeological aspects of Thorpeness.
