= Suffolk & Essex Coast & Heaths National Landscape =

Area of Outstanding Natural Beauty in England

Coordinates: 52.2136°N 1.6236°E

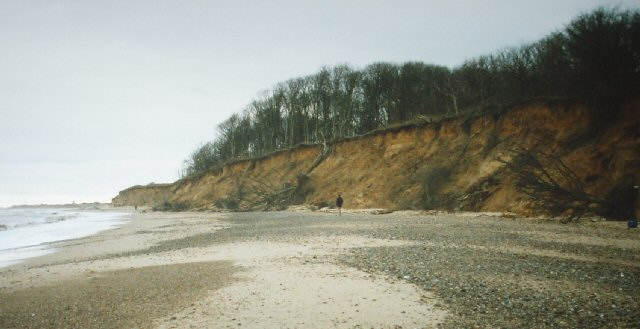
- Cliffs at Easton Wood, near Covehithe, Suffolk in the Suffolk Coast and Heaths AONB

- Location of the Suffolk and Essex Coast and Heaths AONB in the UK
- Location: Suffolk and Essex, England
- Established: 1970
- Website: Suffolk Coast and Heaths AONB Official Website

The Suffolk & Essex Coast & Heaths National Landscape is an Area of Outstanding Natural Beauty in Suffolk and Essex, England.

The AONB covers ancient woodland, commercial forestry, the estuaries of the Alde, Blyth, Deben, Orwell and Stour rivers, farmland, salt marsh, heathland, mudflats, reed beds, small towns and villages, shingle beaches and low eroding cliffs along 60 miles of coastline.

Features include the coastal towns of Aldeburgh and Southwold, Bawdsey, Covehithe, Dunwich, Minsmere, Orford, Orford Ness, Sizewell, Thorpeness, Walberswick and the RSPB Minsmere Reserve. There are three National Nature Reserves in the area and many Sites of Special Scientific Interest. Three long-distance footpaths pass through the AONB: the Suffolk Coast Path, the Sandlings Walk and the Stour and Orwell Walk.

In July 2020 the AONB was extended by around 38 square kilometres to cover land north of Brantham, and an area around Mistley and Wrabness in Essex. It was the first extension to any AONB in England since 2011.
