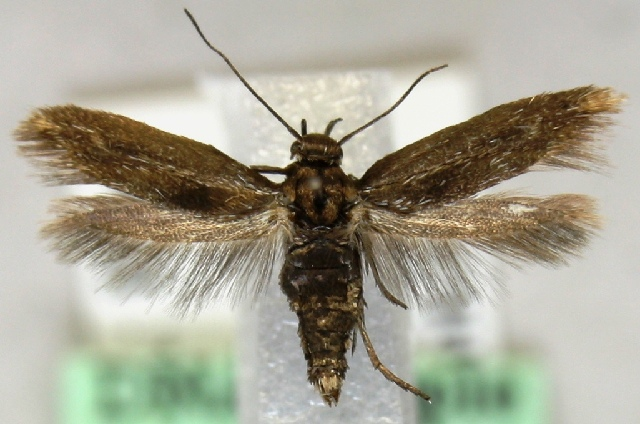

Scientific classification
- Kingdom: Animalia
- Phylum: Arthropoda
- Clade: Pancrustacea
- Class: Insecta
- Order: Lepidoptera
- Family: Scythrididae
- Genus: Scythris
- Species: S. cicadella

Binomial name
- Scythris cicadella (Zeller, 1839)

Synonyms
- Butalis cicadella Zeller, 1839; Oecophora cicadella

= Scythris cicadella =

Species of moth

Scythris cicadella, the sand owlet, is a moth of the family Scythrididae found in Europe. It was first described by Philipp Christoph Zeller in 1839.

== Description ==
The wingspan is 9–11 mm. Adults are on wing from mid-May to the end of June flying during the day visiting flowers.

The larvae feed on annual knawel (Scleranthus annuus) and perennial knawel (Scleranthus perennis). Other foodplants are likely as knawel is not found in Sweden; the likely foodplant is Scleranthus cicadella. Larvae can be found in May and June attached to the foodplant, living in a long silken gallery made of sand and debris.

== Distribution ==
S. cicadella is found in central and south-western Europe in areas of dry or sandy soil. Has been found in small numbers in parts of south-eastern England in the past.
