= Eriswell Low Warren =

Protected area in Suffolk, England

Coordinates: 52.384°N 0.554°E

- Site of Special Scientific Interest
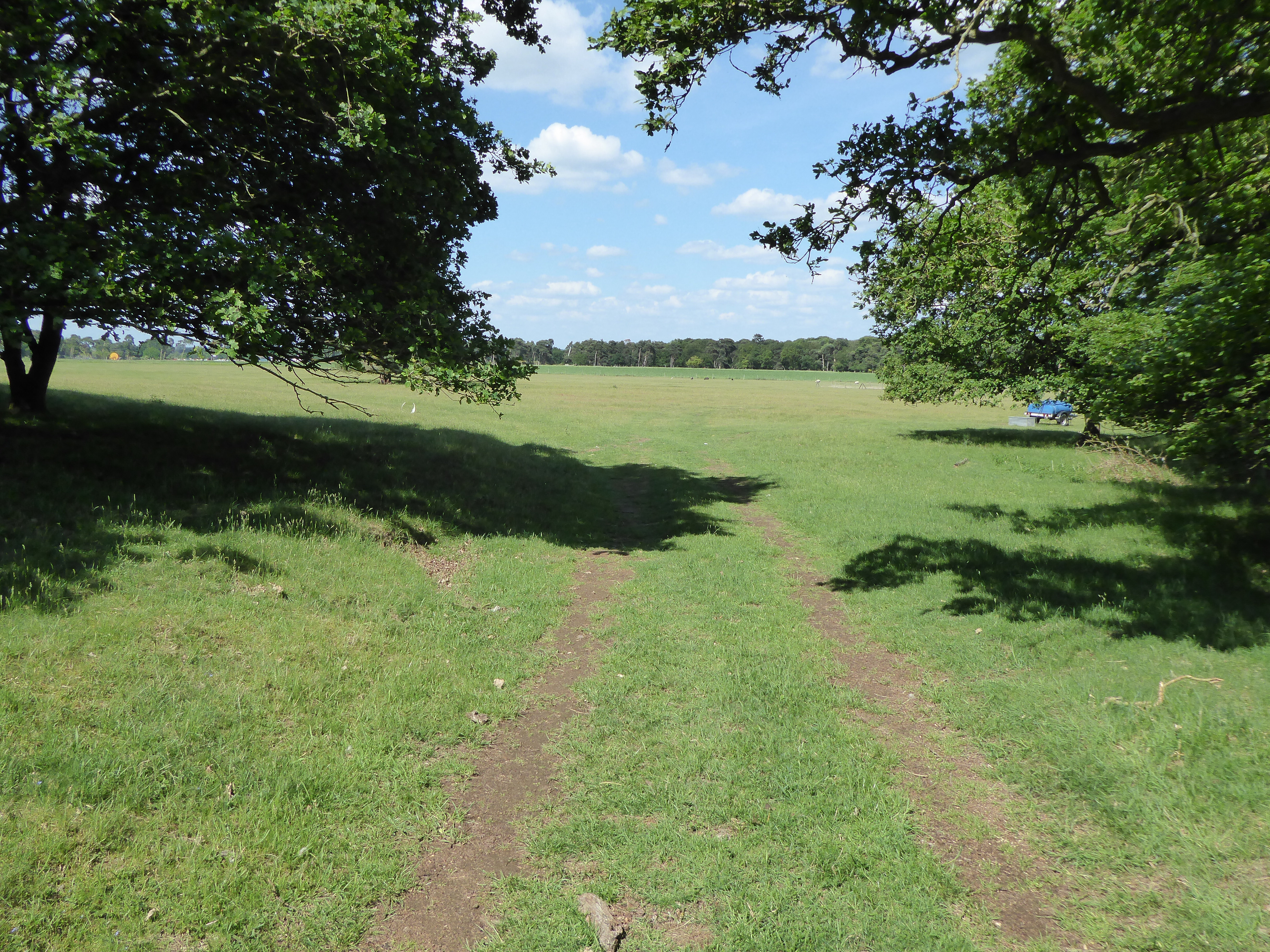
- Location of Eriswell Low Warren.
- Area of search: Suffolk
- Grid reference: TL 739 793
- Interest: Biological
- Area: 7.4 hectares
- Notification date: 1986
- Location map: Magic Map

Eriswell Low Warren is a 7.4-hectare (18-acre) biological Site of Special Scientific Interest north-east of Eriswell in Suffolk. It is a Nature Conservation Review site, Grade I, and part of the Breckland Special Protection Area under the European Union Directive on the Conservation of Wild Birds.

The site is mainly unimproved acidic grassland on sandy soils, which has a variety of typical Breckland flora, and there are also areas of lichens and bryophytes. Rare plants include purple-stem cat's-tail, spring speedwell, Spanish catchfly and perennial knawel.

The site is private land with no public access.
