= Lordswell Field =

Nature conservation site, Eriswell Village, Suffolk

Coordinates: 52.392°N 0.534°E

- Site of Special Scientific Interest
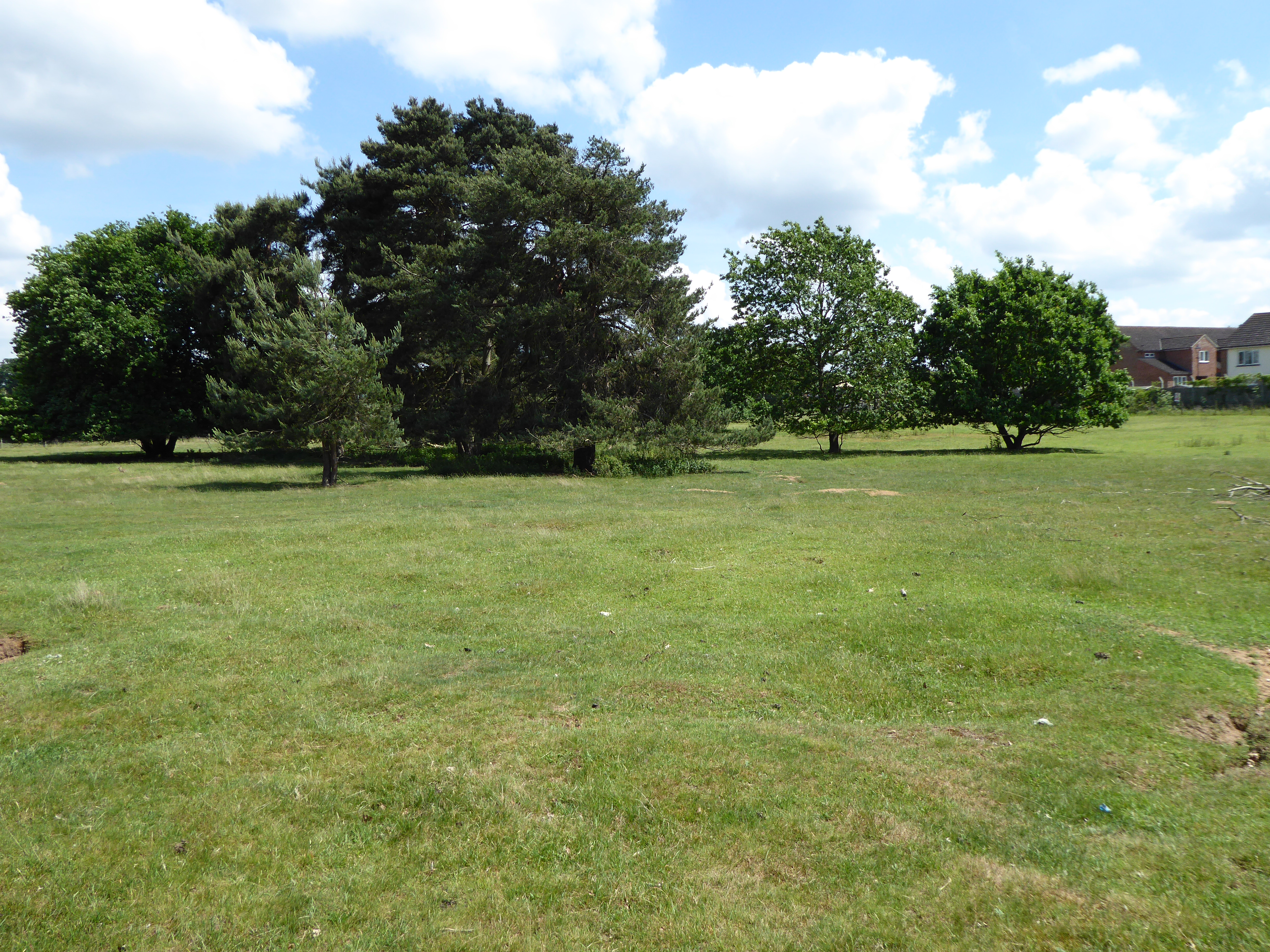
- Location of Lordswell Field.
- Area of search: Suffolk
- Grid reference: TL 725 801
- Interest: Biological
- Area: 3.2 hectares
- Notification date: 1983
- Location map: Magic Map

Lordswell Field or Lord's Well Field is a 3.2-hectare (7.9-acre) biological Site of Special Scientific Interest in Eriswell in Suffolk. It is a Nature Conservation Review site, Grade I.

This area of calcareous Breckland heath has a rich variety of flora including two nationally rare plants, spanish catchfly and perennial knawel, the latter of which is protected under Section 13 of the Wildlife and Countryside Act 1981. There is also an area of lichen heath.

There is access from the B1112 road.
