= Weather and Horn Heaths, Eriswell =

Protected area in Suffolk, England

Coordinates: 52.37°N 0.62°E

- Site of Special Scientific Interest
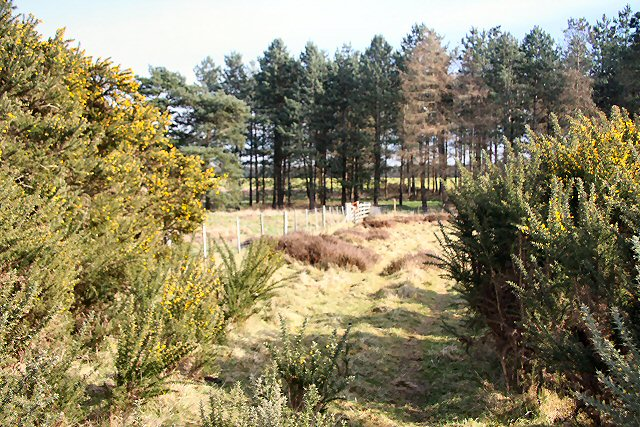
- Gorse on Weather Heath
- Location of Weather and Horn Heaths, Eriswell.
- Area of search: Suffolk
- Grid reference: TL 783 774
- Interest: Biological
- Area: 133.3 hectares
- Notification date: 1983
- Location map: Magic Map

Weather and Horn Heaths, Eriswell is a 133.3-hectare (329-acre) biological Site of Special Scientific Interest east of Eriswell in Suffolk. It is a Nature Conservation Review site, Grade I, and part of the Breckland Special Area of Conservation, and Special Protection Area

There are areas of acidic grassland and heather, together with large parts dominated by mosses and lichens. Grazing by rabbits and stock has kept plants short and the habitat open.

There is public access to the site and the A11 road passes between the two heaths.
