= RAF Lakenheath SSSI =

Protected area in Suffolk, England

Coordinates: 52.41°N 0.56°E

RAF Lakenheath
- Site of Special Scientific Interest
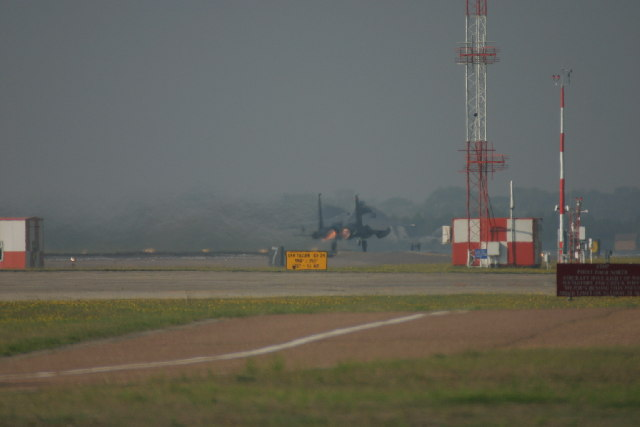
- Location of RAF Lakenheath.
- Area of search: Suffolk
- Grid reference: TL 743 822
- Interest: Biological
- Area: 111.0 hectares
- Notification date: 1997
- Location map: Magic Map

RAF Lakenheath is a 111 hectare biological Site of Special Scientific Interest covering parts of RAF Lakenheath Royal Air Force base, east of Lakenheath in Suffolk. It is in the Breckland Special Area of Conservation.

This grassland site on well-drained sandy soils has more rare plants than any other site in the county, including perennial knawel, Breckland thyme, wild grape hyacinth, sand catchfly, drooping brome and smooth rupturewort. There are also 22 nationally rare and 47 nationally scarce invertebrates.

The site is private land with no public access.
