= How Hill Track =

Protected area in Suffolk, England

Coordinates: 52.358°N 0.573°E

- Site of Special Scientific Interest
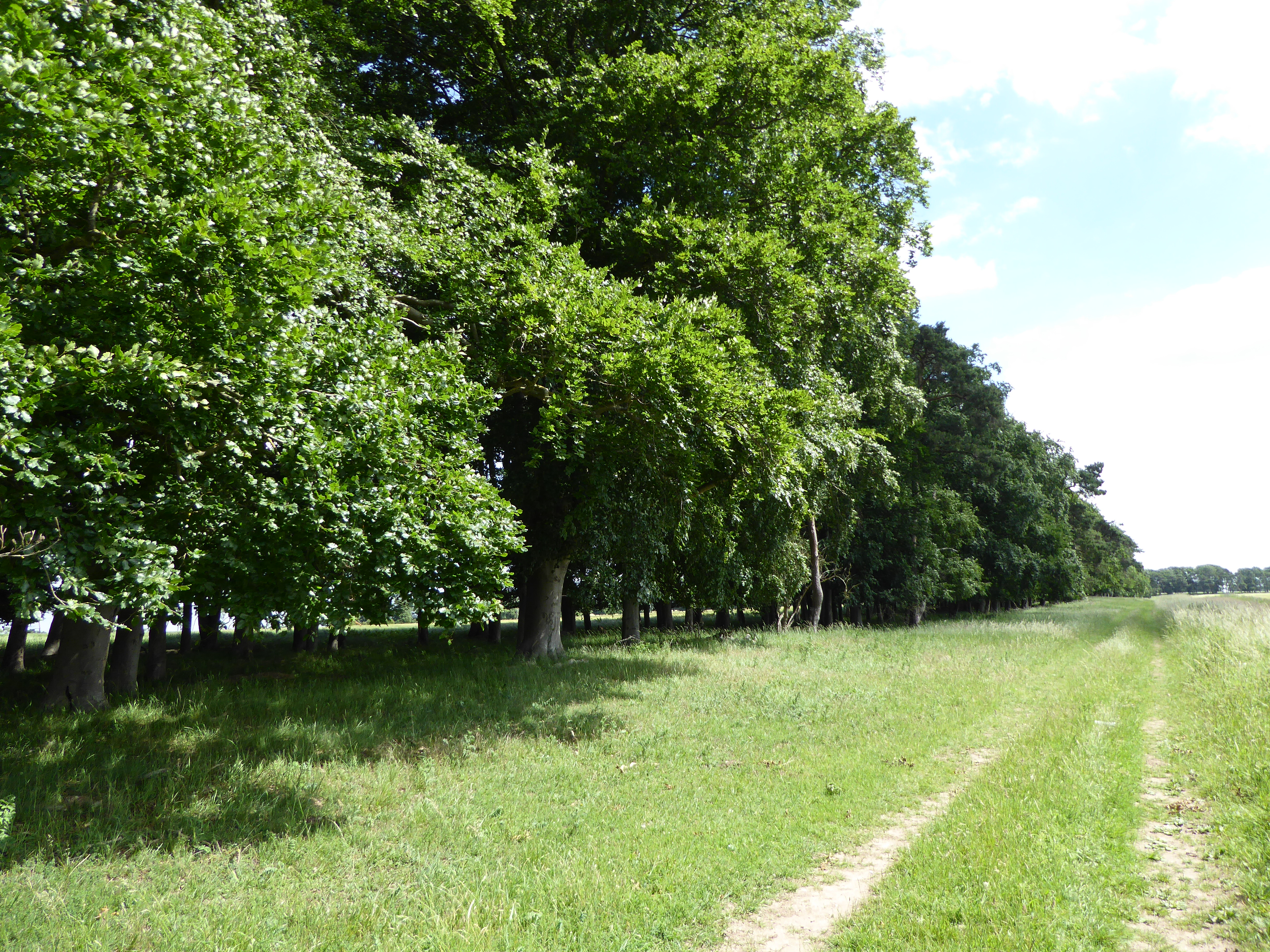
- Location of How Hill Track.
- Area of search: Suffolk
- Interest: Biological
- Area: 3.1 hectares
- Notification date: 1986
- Location map: Magic Map

How Hill Track is a 3.1-hectare (7.7-acre) biological Site of Special Scientific Interest east of Mildenhall in Suffolk. It is in the Breckland Special Protection Area under the European Union Directive on the Conservation of Wild Birds.

This is described by Natural England as a grassland site which provides suitable conditions for seven rare plants, including perennial knawel, small alison, purple-stem cat's tail and sickle medick.

There is access to this site, which is now mainly woodland, from a footpath which runs along its southern edge.
