= Listed buildings in Polstead =

Civil Parish in Suffolk, England

Polstead is a village and civil parish in the Babergh District of Suffolk, England. It contains 65 listed buildings that are recorded in the National Heritage List for England. Of these one is grade I, one is grade II* and 63 are grade II.

This list is based on the information retrieved online from Historic England.

== Key ==
Grade	Criteria
I	Buildings that are of exceptional interest
II*	Particularly important buildings of more than special interest
II	Buildings that are of special interest

== Listing ==
Name	Grade	Location	Type	Completed (Note: The date given is the date used by Historic England as significant for the initial building or that of an important part in the structure's description.)	Date designated	Grid ref. (Note: The grid reference is based on the British national grid reference system, sometimes known as OSGB36, used by the Ordnance Survey.) Geo-coordinates	Notes	Entry number (Note: The "List Entry Number" is a unique number assigned to each listed building and scheduled monument by Historic England.)	Image	Wikidata
Snail Hall and Snails Hall Cottage	II				10 July 1980	TM0022538949; 52°00′46″N 0°54′58″E		1182263	Upload Photo	Q26477525
Tills Farmhouse	II				10 July 1980	TL9812040195; 52°01′29″N 0°53′11″E		1037072	Upload Photo	Q26288769
War Memorial at St Mary's Church	II		war memorial		21 August 2001	TL9894438048; 52°00′19″N 0°53′49″E		1389369	War Memorial at St Mary's Church More images	Q26668808
Holmwood Cottages	II	1 and 2, Bower House Tye			10 July 1980	TL9873540703; 52°01′45″N 0°53′44″E		1037073	Upload Photo	Q26288770
Bower House	II	Bower House Tye			23 January 1958	TL9836640896; 52°01′52″N 0°53′25″E		1351561	Upload Photo	Q26634650
Brewery Farmhouse	II	Bower House Tye			10 July 1980	TL9877640384; 52°01′34″N 0°53′45″E		1284612	Upload Photo	Q26573364
The Bower Close	II	Bower House Tye			23 January 1958	TL9865740750; 52°01′46″N 0°53′40″E		1182270	Upload Photo	Q26477532
Nussteads	II	Boxford Road			10 July 1980	TL9776438752; 52°00′43″N 0°52′49″E		1182274	Upload Photo	Q26477536
Evans Hall	II	Hadleigh Heath			10 July 1980	TL9957341657; 52°02′15″N 0°54′30″E		1284622	Upload Photo	Q26573374
White Hall	II	Heath Road			10 July 1980	TL9949239768; 52°01′14″N 0°54′22″E		1037077	Upload Photo	Q26288773
Stable at High Trees Farm	II	High Trees Farm, Holt Road, CO6 5BU			7 November 2017	TL9850339701; 52°01′13″N 0°53′30″E		1446966	Upload Photo	Q66478792
Threshing Barn at High Trees Farm	II	High Trees Farm, Holt Road, CO6 5BU			7 November 2017	TL9852239706; 52°01′13″N 0°53′31″E		1446967	Upload Photo	Q66478793
Granary to the North of High Trees Farmhouse	II	Holt Road			10 July 1980	TL9845139692; 52°01′13″N 0°53′27″E		1182361	Upload Photo	Q26477615
High Trees Farmhouse	II	Holt Road			10 July 1980	TL9847439656; 52°01′11″N 0°53′28″E		1037082	Upload Photo	Q26288779
Sprott's Farmhouse	II	Holt Road			10 July 1980	TL9897939340; 52°01′00″N 0°53′54″E		1182360	Upload Photo	Q26477614
Brook Cottage	II	Martens Lane			10 July 1980	TL9924637893; 52°00′13″N 0°54′05″E		1351567	Upload Photo	Q26634656
Cherry Tree Farmhouse	II	Martens Lane			10 July 1980	TL9941537353; 51°59′56″N 0°54′13″E		1037041	Upload Photo	Q26288734
Maria Martens Cottage	II	Martens Lane			6 November 1974	TL9939137858; 52°00′12″N 0°54′12″E		1037040	Upload Photo	Q26288732
Martins Hill	II	Martens Lane			10 July 1980	TL9932437845; 52°00′12″N 0°54′09″E		1351586	Upload Photo	Q26634674
Maritime	II	Mill Lane			10 July 1980	TL9861537528; 52°00′02″N 0°53′31″E		1037043	Upload Photo	Q26288737
New Mill Cottage	II	Mill Lane			10 July 1980	TL9874037463; 52°00′00″N 0°53′38″E		1351587	Upload Photo	Q26634675
The Nook	II	Mill Lane			10 July 1980	TL9855137582; 52°00′04″N 0°53′28″E		1351588	Upload Photo	Q26634676
The Thatch	II	Mill Lane			10 July 1980	TL9862137528; 52°00′02″N 0°53′31″E		1037042	Upload Photo	Q26288735
Bridge Cottages	II	Mill Street			23 January 1958	TL9886437454; 52°00′00″N 0°53′44″E		1037046	Upload Photo	Q26288740
Capricorn	II	Mill Street			10 July 1980	TL9890537520; 52°00′02″N 0°53′46″E		1351589	Upload Photo	Q26634677
Mill Cottage	II	Mill Street			10 July 1980	TL9881037463; 52°00′00″N 0°53′41″E		1037047	Upload Photo	Q26288741
Park Lodge	II	Mill Street			10 July 1980	TL9897237721; 52°00′08″N 0°53′50″E		1037044	Upload Photo	Q26288738
The Cottage	II	Mill Street			10 July 1980	TL9884537467; 52°00′00″N 0°53′43″E		1182388	Upload Photo	Q26477641
Yew Tree Cottage	II	Mill Street			10 July 1980	TL9887237478; 52°00′00″N 0°53′44″E		1037045	Upload Photo	Q26288739
Spencer's Farmhouse	II	Polstead Heath			10 July 1980	TL9968640240; 52°01′29″N 0°54′33″E		1182396	Upload Photo	Q26477646
The Orchards	II	Polstead Heath			21 February 1983	TL9973740228; 52°01′28″N 0°54′36″E		1234788	Upload Photo	Q26528168
White House Farmhouse	II	Polstead Heath			10 July 1980	TL9934840067; 52°01′23″N 0°54′15″E		1037048	Upload Photo	Q26288742
Church of St Mary	I	Polstead Park	church building		23 January 1958	TL9890338073; 52°00′20″N 0°53′47″E		1284554	Church of St Mary More images	Q17542299
Polstead Hall	II*	Polstead Park	house		23 January 1958	TL9881638157; 52°00′22″N 0°53′43″E		1037049	Polstead Hall More images	Q17533239
Potash Farmhouse	II	Potash Lane			10 July 1980	TL9935140599; 52°01′41″N 0°54′16″E		1182431	Upload Photo	Q26477678
Barn to the East of Steps Farmhouse	II	Rectory Hill			10 July 1980	TL9857537173; 51°59′51″N 0°53′28″E		1284533	Upload Photo	Q26573294
Steps Farmhouse	II	Rectory Hill			10 July 1980	TL9853737168; 51°59′51″N 0°53′26″E		1037051	Upload Photo	Q26288745
The Rectory	II	Rectory Hill			23 January 1958	TL9878937200; 51°59′52″N 0°53′40″E		1037050	Upload Photo	Q26288744
Cock Farmhouse	II	The Green			10 July 1980	TL9931638340; 52°00′28″N 0°54′10″E		1182277	Upload Photo	Q26477539
Hill House	II	The Green			10 July 1980	TL9932038276; 52°00′26″N 0°54′10″E		1037076	Upload Photo	Q26288772
The Cock Inn	II	The Green	pub		10 July 1980	TL9933438325; 52°00′27″N 0°54′10″E		1037075	The Cock Inn More images	Q26288771
The Old Forge	II	The Green			10 July 1980	TL9924238313; 52°00′27″N 0°54′06″E		1351562	Upload Photo	Q26634651
The Olde Stores	II	The Green			10 July 1980	TL9928238284; 52°00′26″N 0°54′08″E		1182281	Upload Photo	Q26477543
Arborette	II	The Hill			10 July 1980	TL9912638191; 52°00′23″N 0°53′59″E		1182302	Upload Photo	Q26477563
Cobblers	II	The Hill			10 July 1980	TL9925638269; 52°00′25″N 0°54′06″E		1037079	Upload Photo	Q26288775
Corder's House	II	The Hill			23 January 1958	TL9914838139; 52°00′21″N 0°54′00″E		1182333	Upload Photo	Q26477590
Green Cottage Hillside Cottage	II	The Hill			10 July 1980	TL9928338250; 52°00′25″N 0°54′08″E		1351566	Upload Photo	Q26634655
Kings Bank	II	The Hill			10 July 1980	TL9924438235; 52°00′24″N 0°54′06″E		1037081	Upload Photo	Q26288777
Oak Cottage	II	The Hill			10 July 1980	TL9923938269; 52°00′26″N 0°54′05″E		1284597	Upload Photo	Q26573351
Patch Cottage	II	The Hill			10 July 1980	TL9912638125; 52°00′21″N 0°53′59″E		1037080	Upload Photo	Q26288776
Rose Cottage	II	The Hill			10 July 1980	TL9912038170; 52°00′22″N 0°53′59″E		1351563	Upload Photo	Q26634652
The Cottage	II	The Hill			10 July 1980	TL9916238229; 52°00′24″N 0°54′01″E		1037078	Upload Photo	Q26288774
The Cottage	II	The Hill			10 July 1980	TL9915038231; 52°00′24″N 0°54′01″E		1182313	Upload Photo	Q26477571
Tinkers Cottage	II	The Hill			10 July 1980	TL9913338120; 52°00′21″N 0°53′59″E		1182323	Upload Photo	Q26477581
Waterloo House	II	The Hill			10 July 1980	TL9911538142; 52°00′22″N 0°53′59″E		1351565	Upload Photo	Q26634654
West Cottage	II	The Hill			10 July 1980	TL9914938236; 52°00′25″N 0°54′01″E		1351564	Upload Photo	Q26634653
Woodland View	II	The Hill			10 July 1980	TL9925138239; 52°00′25″N 0°54′06″E		1284570	Upload Photo	Q26573328
Bells Corner	II	Water Lane			10 July 1980	TL9922937895; 52°00′13″N 0°54′04″E		1037083	Upload Photo	Q26288780
Dovecote to the South of Polstead Ponds Farmhouse	II	Water Lane			23 January 1958	TL9902738222; 52°00′24″N 0°53′54″E		1182448	Upload Photo	Q26477696
Polstead Ponds Farmhouse	II	Water Lane			23 January 1958	TL9901738246; 52°00′25″N 0°53′54″E		1037052	Upload Photo	Q26288746
The Old Post Cottage	II	Water Lane			10 July 1980	TL9910038035; 52°00′18″N 0°53′58″E		1351590	Upload Photo	Q26634678
4, Whitestreet Green	II	4, Whitestreet Green			10 July 1980	TL9754239516; 52°01′08″N 0°52′39″E		1351430	Upload Photo	Q26634538
The Cottage	II	16, Whitestreet Green			10 July 1980	TL9758539481; 52°01′07″N 0°52′41″E		1037381	Upload Photo	Q26289100
Green Farmhouse	II	Whitestreet Green			10 July 1980	TL9756039532; 52°01′08″N 0°52′40″E		1285964	Upload Photo	Q26574612
Old Bakers	II	Whitestreet Green			10 July 1980	TL9749639494; 52°01′07″N 0°52′37″E		1193867	Upload Photo	Q26488509

== See also ==
- Grade I listed buildings in Suffolk
- Grade II* listed buildings in Suffolk

== Sources ==
- Bettely, James; Pevsner, Nikolaus (2015) [1961], Suffolk: West, The Buildings of England, New Haven and London: Yale University Press, ISBN 978-0-300-19655-9
