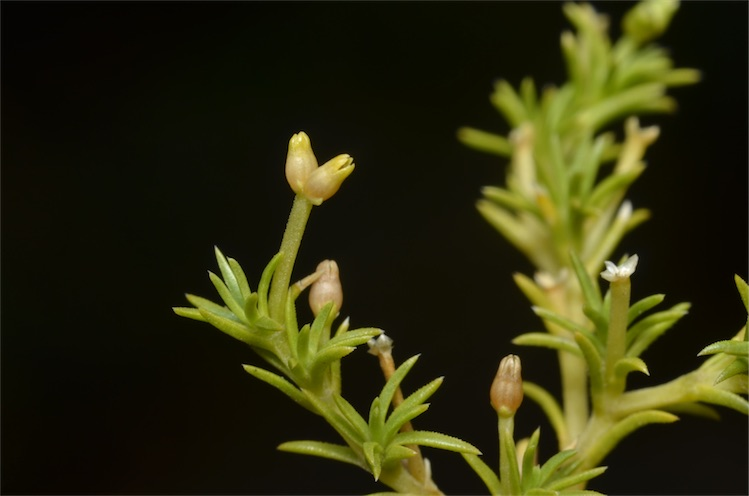

Conservation status
- Vulnerable (IUCN 3.1)

Scientific classification
- Kingdom: Plantae
- Clade: Tracheophytes
- Clade: Angiosperms
- Clade: Eudicots
- Order: Caryophyllales
- Family: Caryophyllaceae
- Genus: Scleranthus
- Species: S. fasciculatus

Binomial name
- Scleranthus fasciculatus (Labill.) Hook.f.
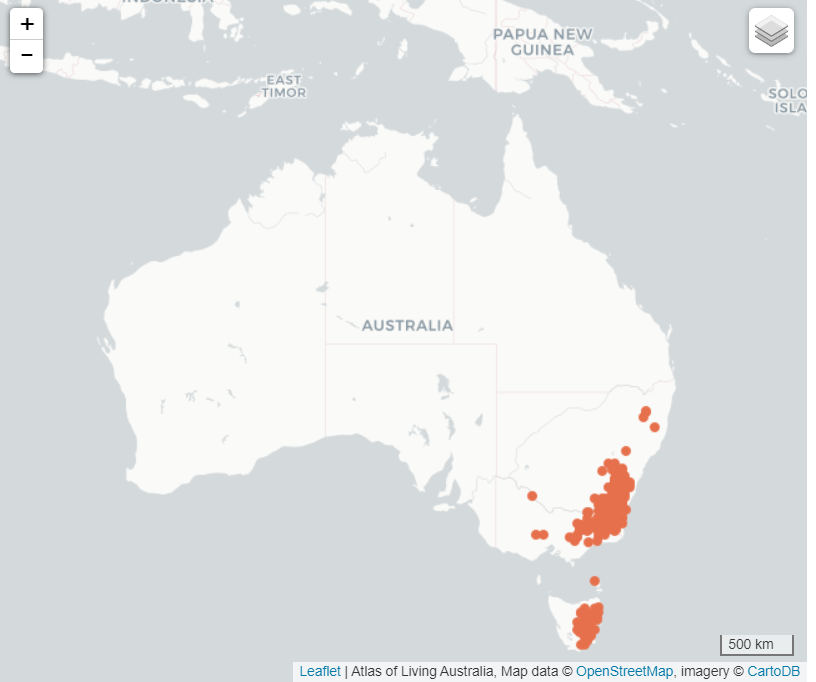

= Scleranthus fasciculatus =

Species of flowering plants

Scleranthus fasciculatus, commonly known as spreading knawel, is a rare, spreading, non-woody herb found in the south-eastern states of Australia and introduced to New Zealand. The species is found in dry grassland habitats and requires the maintenance of inter-tussock spaces for its establishment and persistence. A number of anthropogenic factors have contributed to the species decline such as impacts from land clearing, road construction and maintenance, and herbicide application.

== Description ==
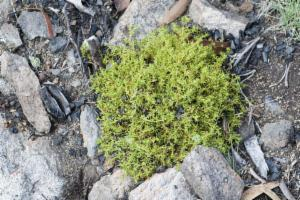
Scleranthus fasciculatus growth habit

Scleranthus fasciculatus is a prostrate spreading perennial herb. Stems are non-woody and tend to be hairy, up to 30 cm (12 in) in length. Leaves are commonly hairy, linear, and papillose, tapering to a point and occur in clusters. The inflorescence consists of a pair of small pedunculate yellow/light green sub-sessile flowers held by bracts. Flowers have five sepals (0.4–0.7 mm (0.016–0.028 in) long) that overlap at the base and no obvious petals. Flowering occurs in September to March. The fruit is enclosed within a perigynium and calyx and takes the form of an ovate indehiscent nutlet containing one ovoid seed.

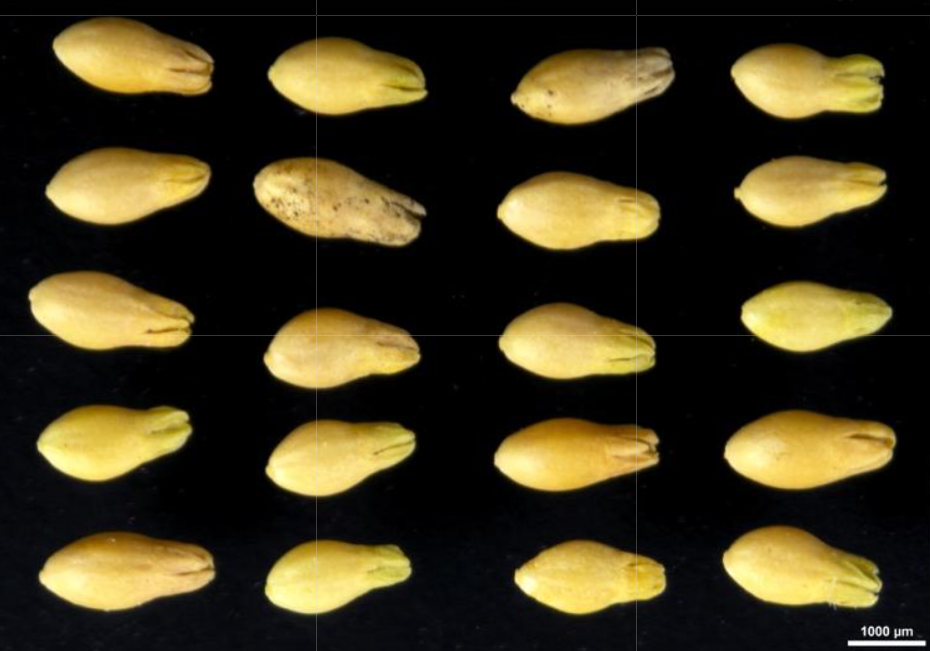
Flower heads of S. fasciculatus

Scleranthus fasciculatus is similar in form to Scleranthus biflorus, an Australian native and commonly cultivated landscaping plant, but it does not form dense cushion-like mats characteristic of the latter species.

== Habitat and distribution ==
Scleranthus fasciculatus grows as a native in the Australian states of Victoria, New South Wales (NSW), the Australian Capital Territory, and Tasmania. It has been introduced to New Zealand.

In Tasmania S. fasciculatus is common to silver tussock (Poa labillardierei) grasslands and grassy woodlands where it grows in gaps between the tussocks alongside many other herbaceous plants that are native to these habitats. Silver tussock grasslands are a subcategory of Tasmanian Lowland Native Grasslands, found in the Midlands, east Coast, Derwent Valley, and southeast of Tasmania. These grasslands are typically common in areas of low rainfall where the soils are deep and fertile, and occur in areas with basalt or dolerite geology.

On mainland Australia the species occurs in Montaine forest and woodlands. It has been observed in the Victorian Tablelands, Kosciuszko National Park, and the western mountains of NSW.

== Threats and conservation ==
Scleranthus fasciculatus is classified as vulnerable in Tasmania and endangered in Victoria.

Tasmanian Lowland Native Grasslands and are classified as a nationally threatened ecological community, and critically endangered in Tasmania. Since European settlement in Tasmania in 1803 there has been extensive clearing of Lowland Native Grasslands amounting to the decline of many species found within them, including S. fasciculatus. Remnants of this vegetation type are located on private property, in some local reserves, in cemeteries or along roadsides. Fire plays a large role in the species persistence as it maintains inter-tussock gaps where the species persists. Threats to S. fasciculatus include land clearing, inappropriate regulations of fire regimes, inappropriate grazing, invasion of weeds, and adverse impacts from herbicide and road construction and maintenance.

Conservation efforts focus on the implementation of appropriate fire and grazing regimes that benefit the ecological community. There is also a focus on controlling introduced deer populations in the Australian Alps to preserve S. fasciculatus and other species and communities that are threatened by their presence.
