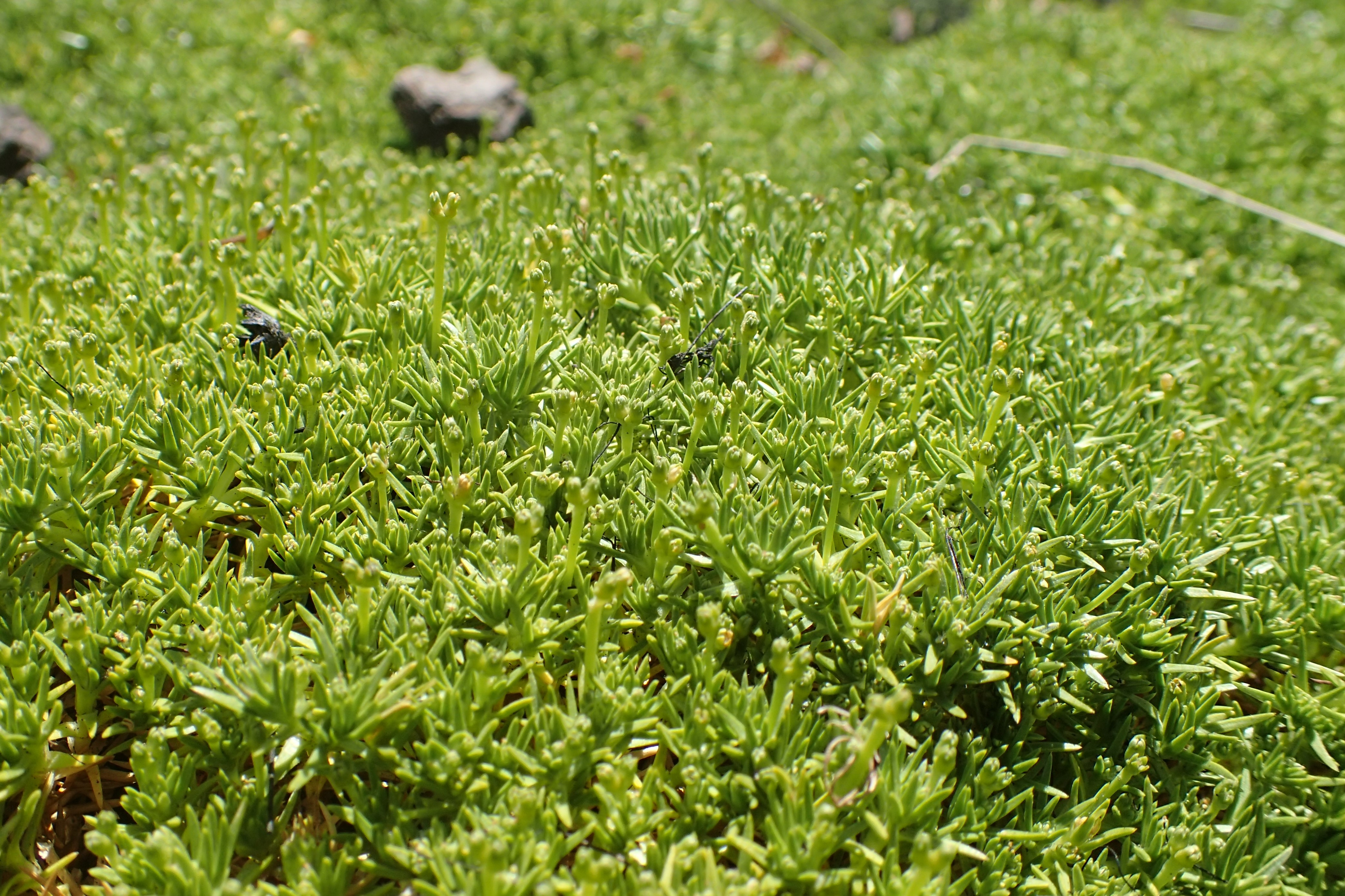

Scientific classification
- Kingdom: Plantae
- Clade: Tracheophytes
- Clade: Angiosperms
- Clade: Eudicots
- Order: Caryophyllales
- Family: Caryophyllaceae
- Genus: Scleranthus
- Species: S. brockiei

Binomial name
- Scleranthus brockiei P.A.Will.

= Scleranthus brockiei =

Species of plant

Scleranthus brockiei is a species of flowering plants first described by PA Williamson. Scleranthus brockiei belongs to the genus Scleranthus, and family Caryophyllaceae.
