= Simon Gales =

- Born: 1964 (age 61–62); Polstead, Suffolk, England
- Education: Goldsmiths, University of London
- Known for: Painting

Simon Gales (born 1964) is a contemporary British artist and painter of limited output who destroys much of his work. He exhibits mainly in London and France.

== Life and work ==
Simon Gales was born in Polstead, Suffolk in 1964. He studied art at Goldsmiths College under Jon Thompson and achieved the joint highest mark graduating alongside Gary Hume and Ian Davenport in the YBA year of 1988. The following year he was selected as one of 25 'Christies New Contemporaries' that included Mark Francis and Glenn Brown in a highly publicised show at the Royal College of Art where six works from his degree show were to be auctioned by Christie's in what was to be the first auction of young contemporary artists by a major auction house. The show attracted media attention and his work was featured in the Telegraph Weekend Colour Supplement as well as the BBC 1 O'Clock News; the auction surpassed expectations making £500,000 with Gales's selling for over four times the estimate. This led him to be commissioned by London Transport for which he painted Childhood a painting London Underground used to publicise the V&A Museum of Childhood at Bethnal Green. 6,000 full sized posters were printed for underground stations with a further 3,000 smaller ones for the escalators.

Gales's early metaphysical works incited him to be included in a number of largely conceptual exhibitions such as A Spiritual Dimension in 1989, a major touring exhibition organised by Peterborough Museum and Art Gallery along with former Goldsmiths tutors Brian Falconbridge, Michael Kenny and Carl Plackman and including Craigie Aitchison, Tess Jaray and Bob Law and supported by works from the Arts Council Collection as well as that of the Royal Academy. Due to the small scale of Gales's works at this time, he was invited again from 1991–1992 to show with Craigie Aitchison in another touring exhibition which was curated by Gillian Jason called Cabinet Paintings which also included Frank Auerbach, Howard Hodgkin, Euan Uglow and Sarah Raphael.

Gales had a series of solo and joint exhibitions notably at the Jill George Gallery in 1990 and later at The Bruton Street Gallery, London in 1999, 2001 which sold out and again in 2003 at which point the gallery closed down.

Gales's interest in metaphysics was due to the influence of initial tutorials with Jon Thompson at Goldsmiths, particularly in regards to the role of intuition. "He put into my head that an extra dimension could be explored beneath the surface of a subject." This resulted in a long series of metaphysical paintings that have more recently undergone some radical changes from spare, singular, kinetic images of varying focus through to carefully designed minimal works bordering on abstraction. These latter pieces are often painted on rectangular panels, the smaller one attached as if floating in front of the larger, casting real shadows that constantly change according to the light. These shadows interplay with the painted image so that the painting becomes a physical reality in the space of the spectator.

== Description of his works ==
... A single colour that continues from the first panel onto the one behind, a step down of no more than half a centimetre, can be of a different light or tone purely as a result of a slight difference in distance from the eye so that the work becomes, in varying degrees, kinetic

He talks about his fascination with greys that is evident in the scull painting.

Banal colours such as digital greys can be sublime and there is something so 21st century about them, very minimal, very contemporary, hence my reluctance to use any shade that resembles black.

== Museum, public gallery, project space summary ==
- États d’âmes 2022 10 years retrospective of the FDAC Collection, Château de Biron, France
- Simon Gales Off Limits 2019 (The Factory exhibition space, Factory Fifteen):- The Factory, London
- Les Ambassadeurs 2019 (with Jane Harris and Jiri Kratochvil, Espace d'Art Contemporain L'Artboretum):- Moulin du Rabois, Argenton sur Creuse, France
- Alive In The Universe 2019 (1 minute films, Caroline Wiseman Modern & Contemporary):- Palazzo Pesaro Papafava, 58th Venice Biennale
- FDAC Collection 2018 2019 (Fonds Departmental d'Art Contemporain):- Espace Culturel François Mitterrand, Périgueux, France
- Cabinet Paintings 1991-92 (Gillian Jason Gallery, London):- Hove Museum and Art Gallery, Sussex; Glynn Vivian Art Gallery, Swansea, Wales
- Childhood 1991 (London Underground, V&A Museum of Childhood, London):- London Transport Museum
- A Spiritual Dimension 1989-90 (Peterborough Museum and Art Gallery, Arts Council):- Peterborough Museum and Art Gallery; Herbert Art Gallery and Museum, Coventry; Worcester City Art Gallery and Museum; Winchester Gallery, Winchester School of Art; Wolsey Gallery, Christchurch Mansion, Ipswich; Shipley Art Gallery, Gateshead
- Christie's New Contemporaries 1989 (Christie's):- Royal College of Art, London
