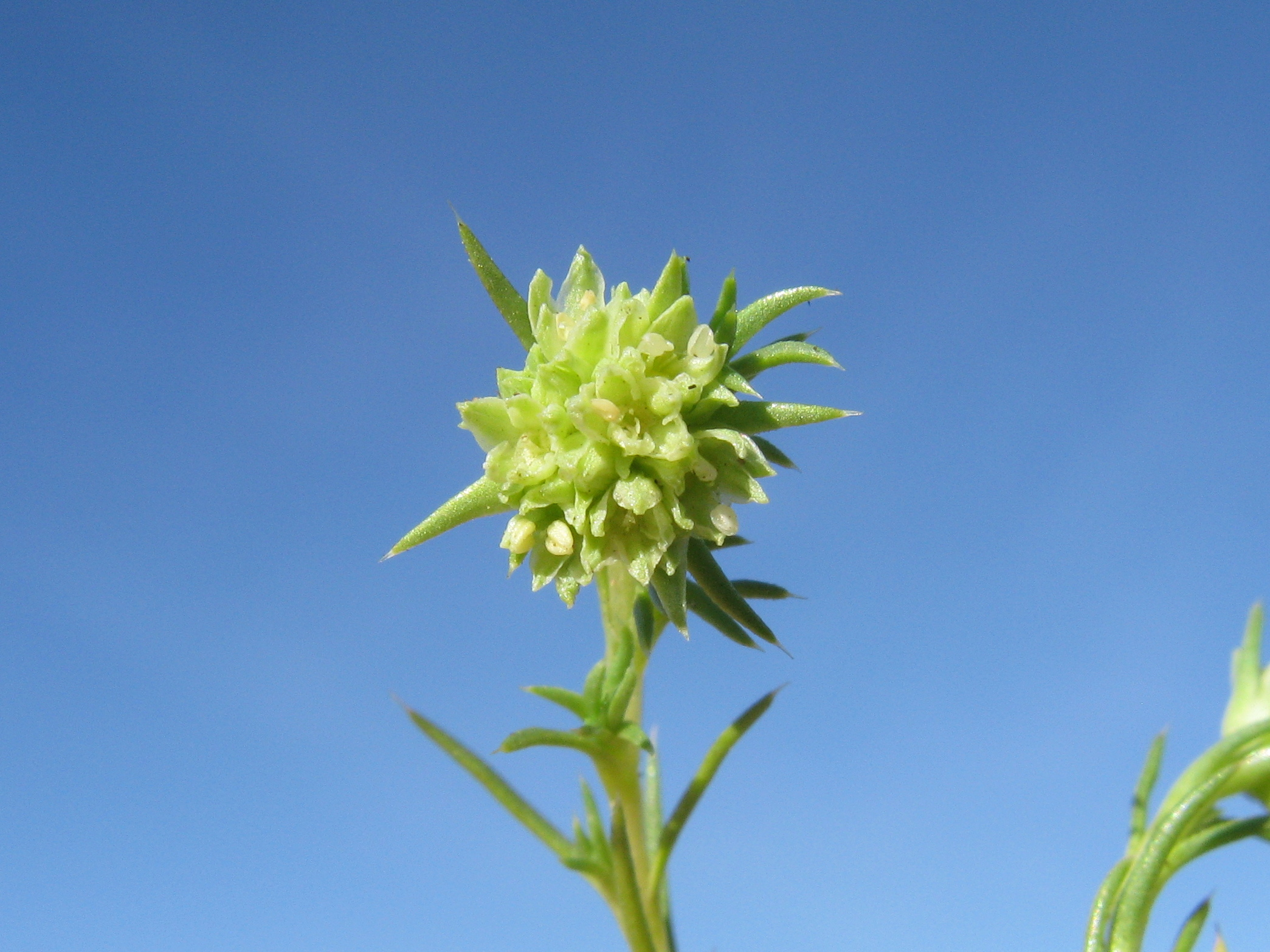

Scientific classification
- Kingdom: Plantae
- Clade: Tracheophytes
- Clade: Angiosperms
- Clade: Eudicots
- Order: Caryophyllales
- Family: Caryophyllaceae
- Genus: Scleranthus
- Species: S. diander

Binomial name
- Scleranthus diander R.Br.

= Scleranthus diander =

Tufted knawel

Species of flowering plant

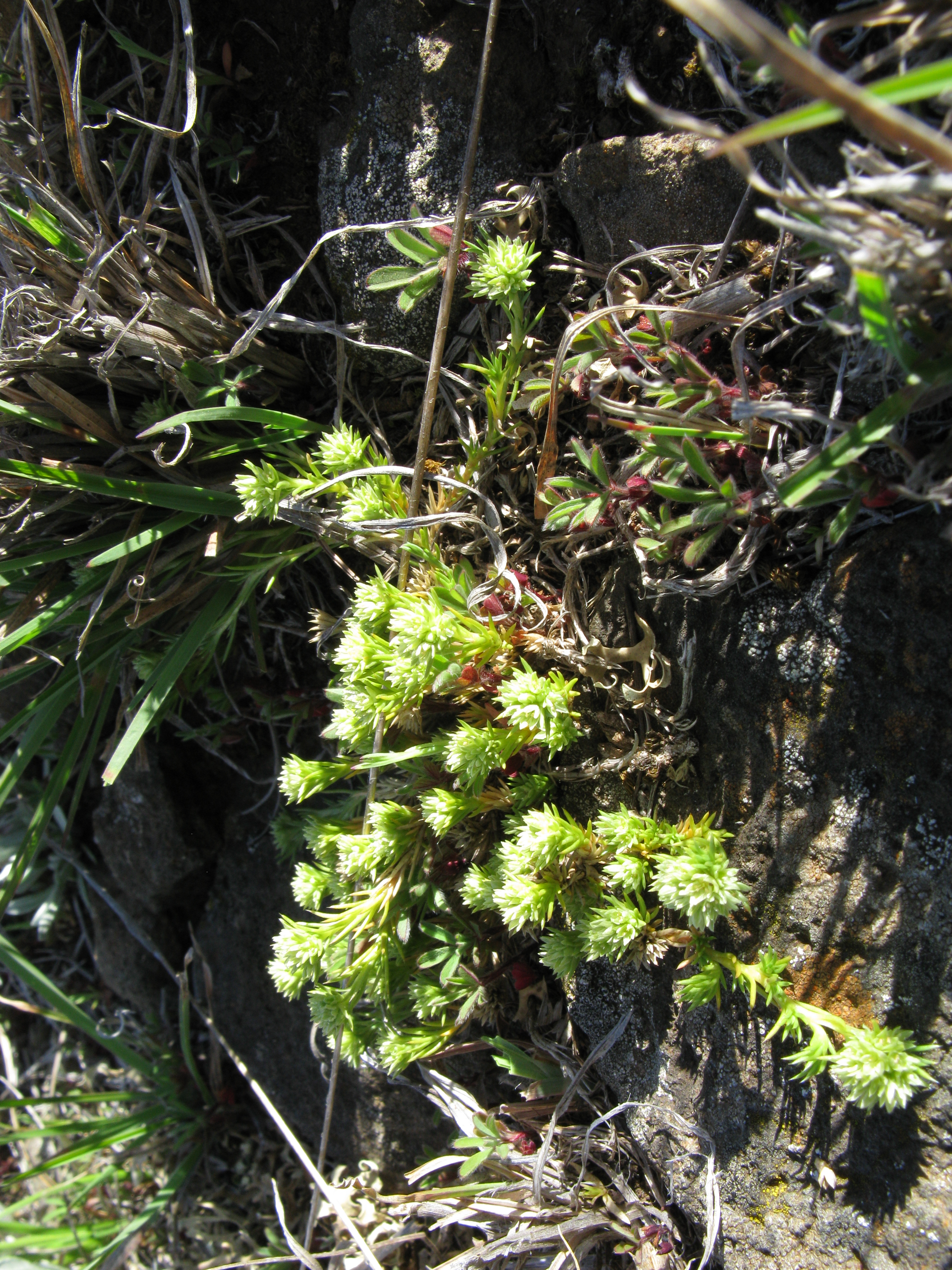
Habit

Scleranthus diander commonly known as tufted knawel, is a flowering plant in the family Caryophyllaceae, it grows in eastern states of Australia and the Australian Capital Territory. It is a small, spreading herb with white or light green flowers.

== Description ==
Scleranthus diander is a small, spreading, multi-stemmed perennial herb that forms a mat or with trailing stems and up to 30 cm (12 in) wide. The leaves are pale green, crowded, linear, triangular in cross-section, 5–9 mm (0.20–0.35 in) long, 0.2–0.7 mm (0.0079–0.0276 in) wide, smooth, more or less keeled and a pointed tip 0.2–0.9 mm (0.0079–0.0354 in) long. The pale green or white flowers are mostly sessile, obscure or on a botany 0.7 mm (0.028 in) long, and borne in clusters at the end of branches or in leaf axils. The bracts are sharply tipped, cream-coloured, usually longer than the flowers, calyx more or less pointed, spreading and mostly longer than the floral tube. Flowering occurs usually from October to January and the fruit is a ribbed nutlet, 2.2–3.5 mm (0.087–0.138 in) long and 0.7–1.5 mm (0.028–0.059 in) wide.

== Taxonomy ==
Scleranthus diander was first formally described in 1810 by Robert Brown and the description was published in Prodromus florae Novae Hollandiae. The specific epithet (diander) means "two stamens".

== Distribution and habitat ==
Tufted knawel grows in woodland, grassland, pastures and dry habitats in eastern states of Australia and the Australian Capital Territory.
