= James Curtis (journalist) =

British journalist and eccentric (fl. 1828–1835)

James Curtis (fl. 1828–1835) was a British journalist and eccentric. He is best known for his association with William Corder, hanged for the Red Barn Murder.

Curtis was a habitué of the Old Bailey, taking notes of court cases apparently for his own interest rather than as a regularly commissioned journalist. He invented his own shorthand for the purpose. He was known for his eccentric behaviour, fondness for long walks and insomnia.

He befriended William Corder after taking an interest in the Red Barn case, and sat by him during his trial: indeed, he became so connected with the case that a newspaper artist, asked to produce a picture of the accused man, drew him instead. Curtis carried out a thorough survey of the case and published what is regarded as the best contemporary account of the trial.

== Publications ==
- Short-hand Made Shorter; Or, Stenography Simplified, 1835
- An Authentic and Faithful History of the Mysterious Murder of Maria Marten: With a Full Development of All the Extraordinary Circumstances which Led to the Discovery of Her Body in the Red Barn; to which is Added, the Trial of William Corder, Taken at Large in Short Hand Specially for this Work (with William Corder), 1834
