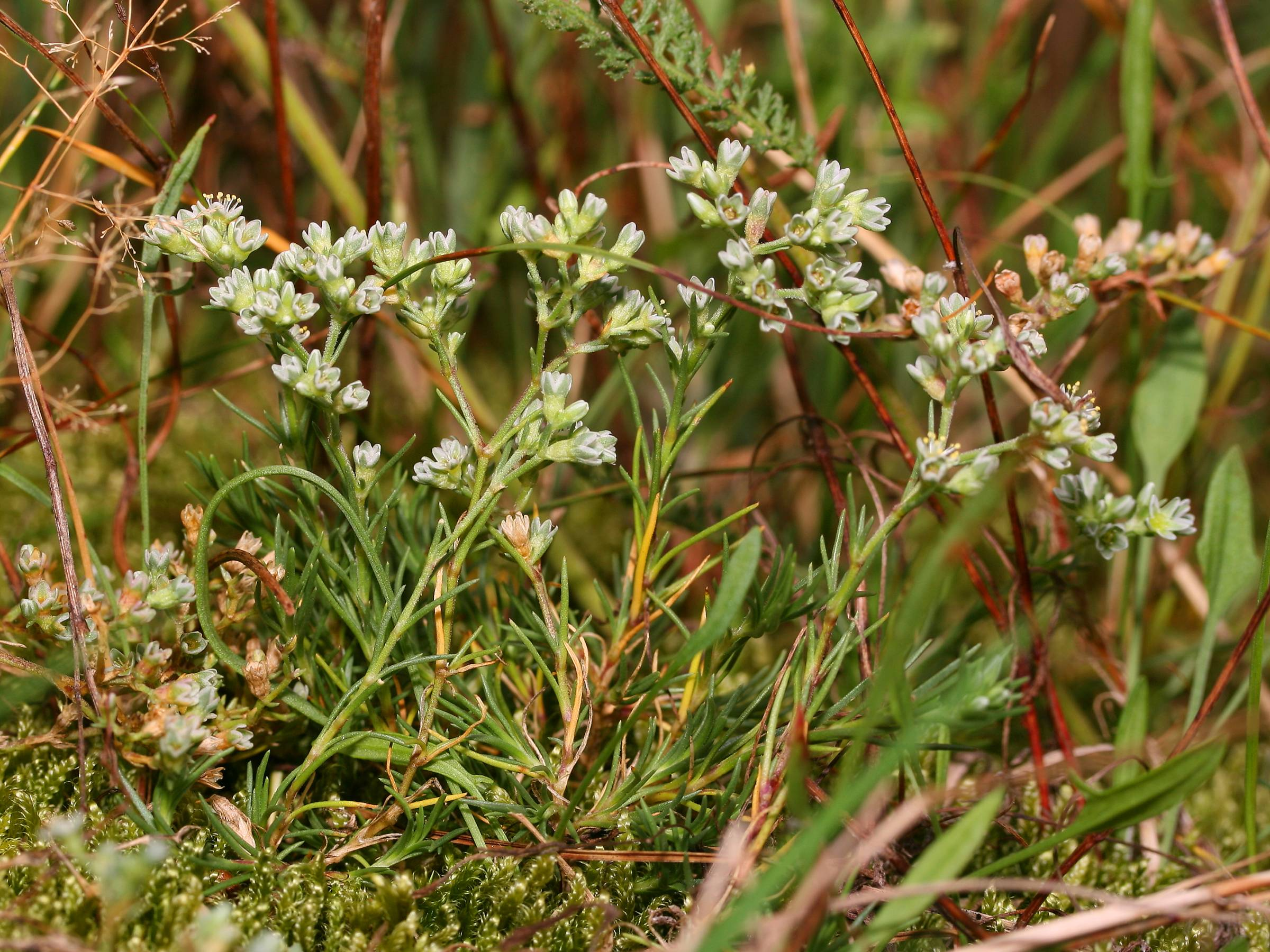
- Scleranthus perennis

Scientific classification
- Kingdom: Plantae
- Clade: Tracheophytes
- Clade: Angiosperms
- Clade: Eudicots
- Order: Caryophyllales
- Family: Caryophyllaceae
- Genus: Scleranthus; L. (1753)

Species
- 12; see text

Synonyms
- Ditoca Banks ex Gaertn. (1791); Knauthia Heist. ex Fabr. (1763), nom. superfl.; Knavel Ség. (1754), nom. superfl.; Mniarum J.R.Forst. & G.Forst. (1776)

= Scleranthus =

Genus of flowering plants

Scleranthus, the knawels, are a genus of herbaceous plants in the family Caryophyllaceae. It includes 12 species native to Europe, Siberia, western Asia, north Africa, Ethiopia, New Guinea, and Australia.

== Species ==
12 species are accepted.

- Scleranthus annuus L. – German-knotweed, knawel or annual knawel, native to Africa, Europe, Asia and naturalised elsewhere.
- Scleranthus biflorus (J.R.Forst. & G.Forst.) Hook.f. – knawel, cushion-bush or two-flowered knawel, native to Australia and New Zealand
- Scleranthus brockiei P.A.Will. – native to Australia and New Zealand
- Scleranthus delortii Gren.
- Scleranthus diander R.Br. – tufted knawel, native to Australia
- Scleranthus fasciculatus (R.Br.) Hook.f. – native to Australia, introduced to New Zealand
- Scleranthus × intermedius Kitt.
- Scleranthus minusculus F.Muell. – native to Australia
- Scleranthus perennis L. – perennial knawel
- Scleranthus pungens R.Br. – native to Australia
- Scleranthus singuliflorus (F.Muell.) Mattf. – one-flowered knawel, native to higher alpine areas in Australia
- Scleranthus uncinatus Schur
- Scleranthus uniflorus P.A.Will.
