= Gospel Oak, Polstead =

Veteran tree in England

Coordinates: 52.0057°N 0.8956°E

Gospel Oak
- Location: Polstead, Suffolk
- Date felled: November 1953

The Gospel Oak was a veteran tree in Polstead, Suffolk. The tree is associated with Saint Cedd, who reputedly planted it or preached beneath it. The oak tree is thought to have been named for its association with an annual church service, reputedly held beneath it for more than a millennium, and the tree is said to have been the oldest in the county when it collapsed in November 1953. A descendant grows nearby and has since been used as the site for the annual service.

== Association with Saint Cedd ==
The tree is associated with Saint Cedd (died 664 AD), a Northumbrian from the Lindisfarne monastery who proselytised in East Anglia, Mercia and Northumbria. The Gospel Oak is thought to date from around this time and legend holds that Cedd and his monks preached from beneath the tree in the years before the village's St Mary's Church was built. Other legends state that the tree was planted by Cedd or one of his followers. The tree is one of two associated with Cedd, the other is the "Great Oak" at Great Yeldham, Essex – which lay within Cedd's diocese as bishop of the East Saxons.

It has been claimed that the Gospel Oak has been the venue for an annual service for more than a millennium. It is thought this ceremony is a survival of the Rogationtide tradition of beating the bounds in which a procession, led by the parish priest, would mark the limits of parish lands, and ask God for good weather and a bountiful harvest. Such processions often paused under an ancient tree in the parish, where the priest would read a sermon from the Gospels. As a result these trees became known as "gospel trees". It is known that an annual service has been held at the tree in the first week of August since 3 August 1902, when it was held by the Reverend Francis John Eld.

== Later history ==
The tree was described as the oldest in England in 1903, though this is unlikely given the ages of other known trees. It is, however, thought to have been the oldest tree in Suffolk at around 1,300 years old. It was later incorporated into the grounds of Polstead Hall, visible from the churchyard, and by 1900 stood at 36 feet (11 m) in circumference. It collapsed in November 1953, and as of 2010, its remains were visible near the village war memorial.

A naturally seeded sapling from the tree grows nearby, and has become the new spot for the annual church service, now held every first Sunday of August since the loss of the original tree.
