= Lisa Evans (playwright) =

British playwright (20th-21st century)

Lisa Evans is a British playwright and has been a Royal Literary Fund fellow at several universities.

She trained as an actor at Guildhall School of Music and Drama and performed in the United Kingdom and the United States before becoming a playwright.

Her work includes the stage adaptation of Melvyn Bragg's The Maid of Buttermere, and The Day the Waters Came, about the effects of Hurricane Katrina.

She has written for television including EastEnders, Holby City, Casualty, Peak Practice and The Bill. Her work for radio includes Stamping, Shouting and Singing Home (BBC Radio 4 Monday Play, 1987), Ring o'Roses (Afternoon Theatre, 1981) and Hanging Fire, about the Red Barn Murder (Monday Play, 1990).

She won the British Theatre Association award in 1986 for Under Exposure and in 1988 for The Red Chair, and the Writers' Guild award for best play for young audiences in 2011 for The Day the Waters Came and in 2017 for Rise Up.
