= Red Barn Murder =

Murder committed in Polstead, Suffolk, England in 1827

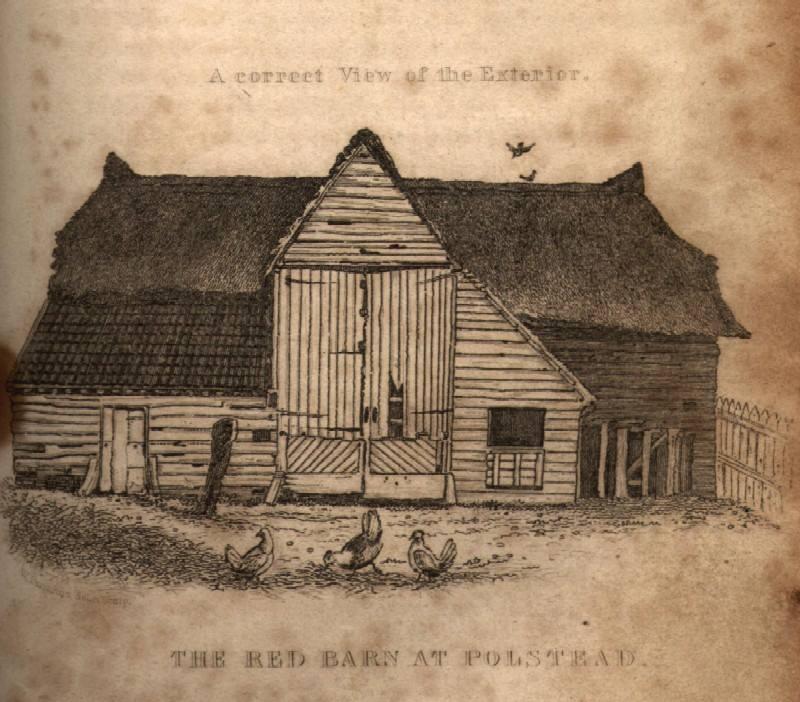
The Red Barn, so called for the red clay-tiled roof to the left of its main door. The remaining roof was thatched.

The Red Barn Murder was an 1827 murder in Polstead, Suffolk, England. A young woman, Maria Marten, was shot dead by her lover William Corder at the Red Barn, a local landmark. The two had arranged to meet before eloping to Ipswich. Corder sent letters to Marten's family claiming that she was well, but after her stepmother spoke of having dreamed that Maria had been murdered, her body was discovered in the barn the next year.

Corder was located in London, where he had married. He was returned to Suffolk and found guilty of murder in a well-publicised trial. In 1828, he was hanged at Bury St Edmunds in an execution witnessed by a huge crowd. The story provoked numerous newspaper articles, songs and plays. The village where the crime had taken place became a tourist attraction and the barn was stripped by souvenir hunters. Plays, ballads and songs about the murder remained popular throughout the next century and continue to be performed today.

== Murder ==
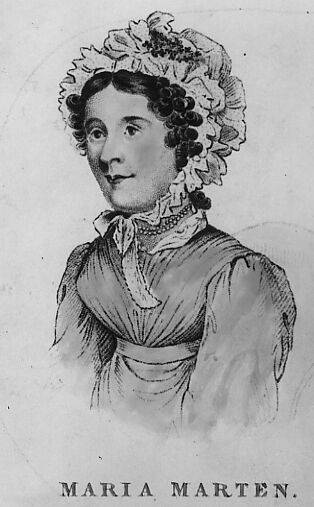
Maria Marten; her sister Ann, who was said to be very similar to Maria, was the model for this sketch which appeared in Curtis's account of the case

Maria Marten (born 24 July 1801) was the daughter of Thomas Marten, a molecatcher from Polstead in Suffolk. In March 1826, when she was aged 24, Marten formed a relationship with 22-year-old William Corder. Marten was an attractive woman and relationships with men from the neighbourhood had already resulted in two children. One child – belonging to Corder's older brother Thomas – died as an infant, but the other, Thomas Henry, was still alive at the time Corder met Marten. Thomas Henry's father, Peter Matthews, did not marry Marten but regularly sent money to provide for the child.

Corder (born c. 1803) was the son of a local farmer and had a reputation as something of a fraudster and ladies' man. He was known as "Foxey" at school because of his sly manner. Corder once fraudulently sold his father's pigs, although his father had settled the matter without involving the law, but Corder had not changed his behaviour. He later obtained money by passing a forged cheque for £93 and had helped local thief Samuel "Beauty" Smith steal a pig from a neighbouring village. When Smith was questioned by the local constable over the theft, he made a prophetic statement concerning Corder: "I'll be damned if he will not be hung some of these days." Corder had been sent to London in disgrace after his fraudulent sale of the pigs, but he was recalled to Polstead when his brother Thomas drowned attempting to cross a frozen pond. Corder's father and three brothers all died within eighteen months of each other and only he remained to run the farm with his mother.

Corder wished to keep his relationship with Marten a secret, but she gave birth to their child in 1827 at age 25 and was apparently keen that she and Corder should marry. The child died (later reports suggested that he/she may have been murdered), but Corder apparently still intended to marry Marten. That summer, in the presence of Marten's stepmother, Ann, Corder suggested that she meet him at the Red Barn, from where he proposed that they elope to Ipswich. He claimed that he had heard rumours that the parish officers were going to prosecute Marten for having bastard children.

Corder initially suggested that they elope on the evening of Wednesday, 16 May 1827, but later decided to delay until the following evening. On 17 May, he was again delayed; his brother falling ill is mentioned as the reason in some sources, although most claim that all his brothers were dead by this time. On Friday, 18 May, Corder appeared at the Martens' cottage during the day and, according to Ann, told her stepdaughter that they had to leave at once, as he had heard that the local constable had obtained a warrant to prosecute her (no warrant had been obtained, but it is not known if Corder was lying or was mistaken). Marten was worried that she could not leave in broad daylight, but Corder told her that she should dress in men's clothing so as to avert suspicion, and he would carry her things to the Red Barn and change before they continued on to Ipswich.

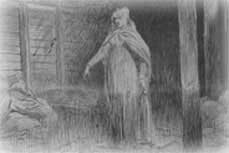
Maria's ghost points to her grave. Ann Marten's claim that she dreamed about the location of Maria's grave added to the appeal of the case for the public and press.

Shortly after Corder left the Martens' cottage, Marten set out to meet him at the Red Barn, which was situated on Barnfield Hill, about half a mile from the cottage. This was the last time that she was seen alive. Corder also disappeared, but later turned up and claimed that Marten was in Ipswich, or some other place nearby, and that he could not yet bring her back as his wife for fear of provoking the anger of his friends and relatives. The pressure on Corder to produce his wife eventually forced him to leave the area. He wrote letters to Marten's family claiming that they were married and living on the Isle of Wight, and he gave various excuses for her lack of communication: she was unwell, she had hurt her hand or the letter must have been lost.

Suspicion continued to grow, and Marten's stepmother began talking of dreams that Maria had been murdered and buried in the Red Barn. On 19 April 1828, she persuaded her husband to go to the Red Barn and dig in one of the grain storage bins. He quickly uncovered the remains of his daughter buried in a sack. She was badly decomposed but still identifiable. An inquest was carried out at the Cock Inn at Polstead (which still stands today), where Marten was formally identified by her sister (also named Ann) from some physical characteristics. Her hair and some clothing were recognisable, and she was known to be missing a tooth which was also absent from the jawbone of the corpse. Evidence was uncovered to implicate Corder in the crime: his green handkerchief was discovered around the body's neck.

== Capture ==
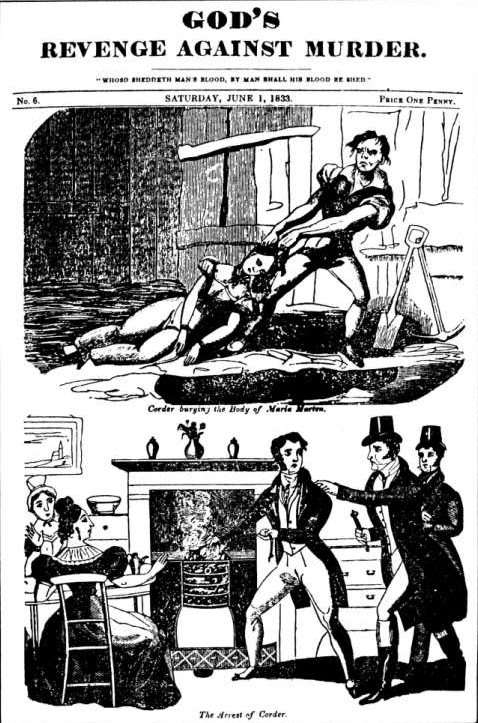
This "penny dreadful" from 1833 shows Maria's burial and Ayres and Lea arresting Corder

Corder was easily discovered, as Ayres, the constable in Polstead, was able to obtain his old address from a friend. Ayres was assisted by James Lea, an officer of the London police who later led the investigation into "Spring-heeled Jack". They tracked Corder to Everley Grove House, a boarding house for ladies in Brentford. He was running the boarding house with his new wife Mary Moore, whom he had met through a lonely hearts advertisement that he had placed in The Times (which had received more than 100 replies).^{[a]} Judith Flanders states in her 2011 book that Corder had also placed advertisements in the Morning Herald and The Sunday Times. He received more than forty replies from the Morning Herald and 53 from The Sunday Times that he never picked up. These letters were subsequently published by George Foster in 1828.

Lea managed to gain entry under the pretext that he wished to board his daughter there, and he surprised Corder in the parlour. Thomas Hardy noted the Dorset County Chronicle's report of his capture:

…in parlour with 4 ladies at breakfast, in dressing gown & had a watch before him by which he was 'minuting' the boiling of some eggs.

Lea took Corder to one side and informed him of the charges, but he denied all knowledge of both Marten and the crime. A search of the house uncovered a pair of pistols supposedly bought on the day of the murder; some letters from a Mr. Gardener, which may have contained warnings about the discovery of the crime; and a passport from the French ambassador, evidence which suggested that Corder may have been preparing to flee.

== Trial ==
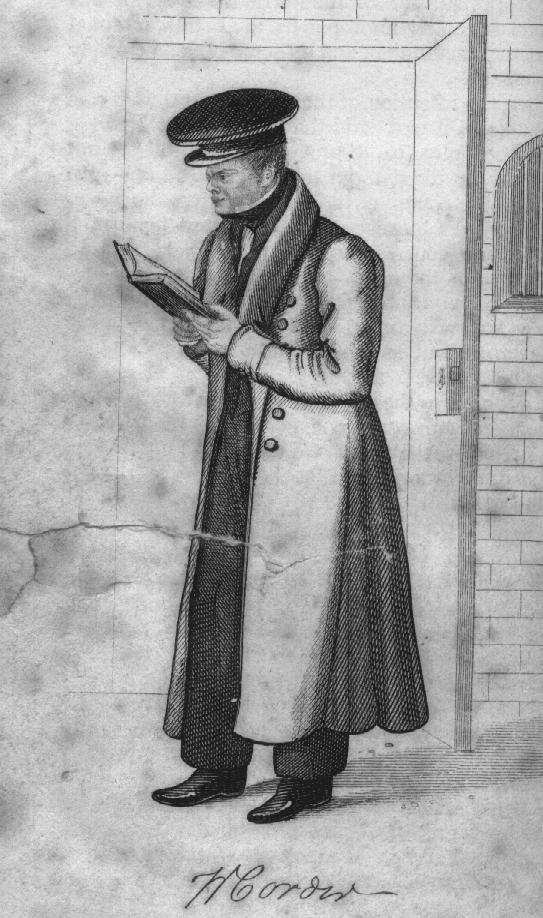
William Corder awaiting trial

Corder was taken back to Suffolk, where he was tried at Shire Hall, Bury St Edmunds. The trial started on 7 August 1828, having been put back several days because of the interest which the case had generated. The hotels in Bury St Edmunds began to fill up from as early as 21 July, and admittance to the court was by ticket only because of the large numbers who wanted to view the trial. Despite this, the judge and court officials still had to push their way bodily through the crowds that had gathered around the door. The judge was the Chief Baron of the Exchequer, William Alexander, who was unhappy with the coverage given to the case by the press "to the manifest detriment of the prisoner at the bar." The Times, nevertheless, congratulated the public for showing good sense in aligning themselves against Corder, who entered a plea of not guilty.

Marten's exact cause of death could not be established. It was thought that a sharp instrument had been plunged into her eye socket, possibly Corder's short sword, but this wound could have been caused by her father's spade when he was exhuming the body. Strangulation could not be ruled out, as Corder's handkerchief had been discovered around her neck; to add to the confusion, the wounds to her body suggested that she had been shot. The indictment charged Corder with "murdering Maria Marten, by feloniously and wilfully shooting her with a pistol through the body, and likewise stabbing her with a dagger." To avoid any chance of a mistrial, Corder was indicted on nine charges, including one of forgery.

Marten's stepmother was called to give evidence of the events of the day of Maria's disappearance and her later dreams. Thomas Marten then told the court how he had dug up his daughter, and Maria's 10-year-old brother George revealed that he had seen Corder with a loaded pistol before the alleged murder and had later seen him walking from the barn with a pickaxe. Lea gave evidence concerning Corder's arrest and the objects found during the search of his house. The prosecution suggested that Corder had never wanted to marry Maria Marten, but that her knowledge of some of his criminal dealings had given her a hold over him, and that his theft of the money sent by her child's father had been a source of tension between them.

Corder then gave his own version of the events. He admitted to being in the barn with Marten, but said that he had left after they argued. He claimed that he heard a pistol shot while he was walking away, and that he ran back to the barn to find her dead with one of his pistols beside her. Corder pleaded with the jury to give him the benefit of the doubt, but after they retired, it took them only thirty-five minutes to return with a guilty verdict. Baron Alexander sentenced Corder to hang and afterwards be dissected:

That you be taken back to the prison whence you came, and that you be taken from thence, on Monday next, to a place of Execution, and that you there be hanged by the Neck until you are Dead; and that your body shall afterwards be dissected and anatomized; and may the Lord God Almighty, of his infinite goodness, have mercy on your soul!

Corder spent the next three days in prison agonising over whether to confess to the crime and make a clean breast of his sins before God. He finally confessed after entreaties from his wife, several meetings with the prison chaplain and pleas from both his warder and John Orridge, the governor of the prison. Corder strongly denied stabbing Marten, claiming that he had shot her in the eye after they argued.

== Execution and dissection ==
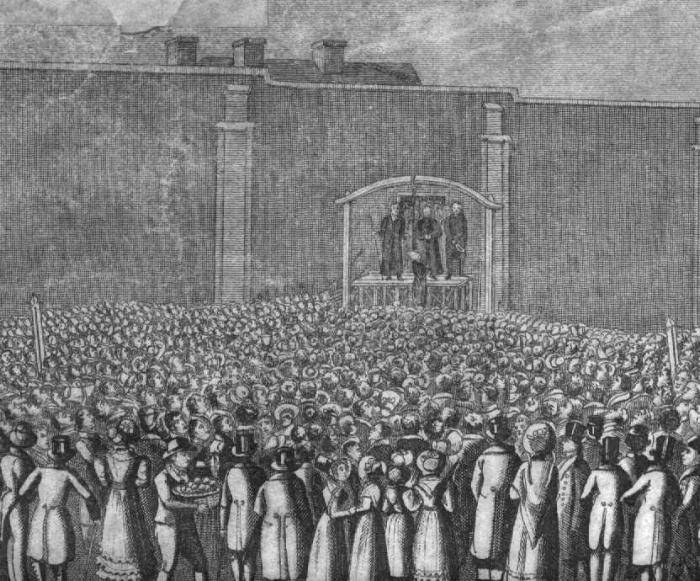
The execution of William Corder

On 11 August 1828, Corder was taken to the gallows in Bury St Edmunds, apparently too weak to stand without support. He was hanged shortly before noon in front of a large crowd; one newspaper claimed that there were 7,000 spectators, another as many as 20,000. At the prompting of Orridge, just before the hood was drawn over his head, Corder said:

I am guilty; my sentence is just; I deserve my fate; and, may God have mercy on my soul.

Corder's body was cut down after an hour by the hangman, John Foxton, who claimed his trousers and stockings according to his rights. The body was taken back to the courtroom at Shire Hall, where it was slit open along the abdomen to expose the muscles. The crowds were allowed to file past until six o'clock, when the doors were shut. According to the Norwich and Bury Post, over 5,000 people queued to see the body.

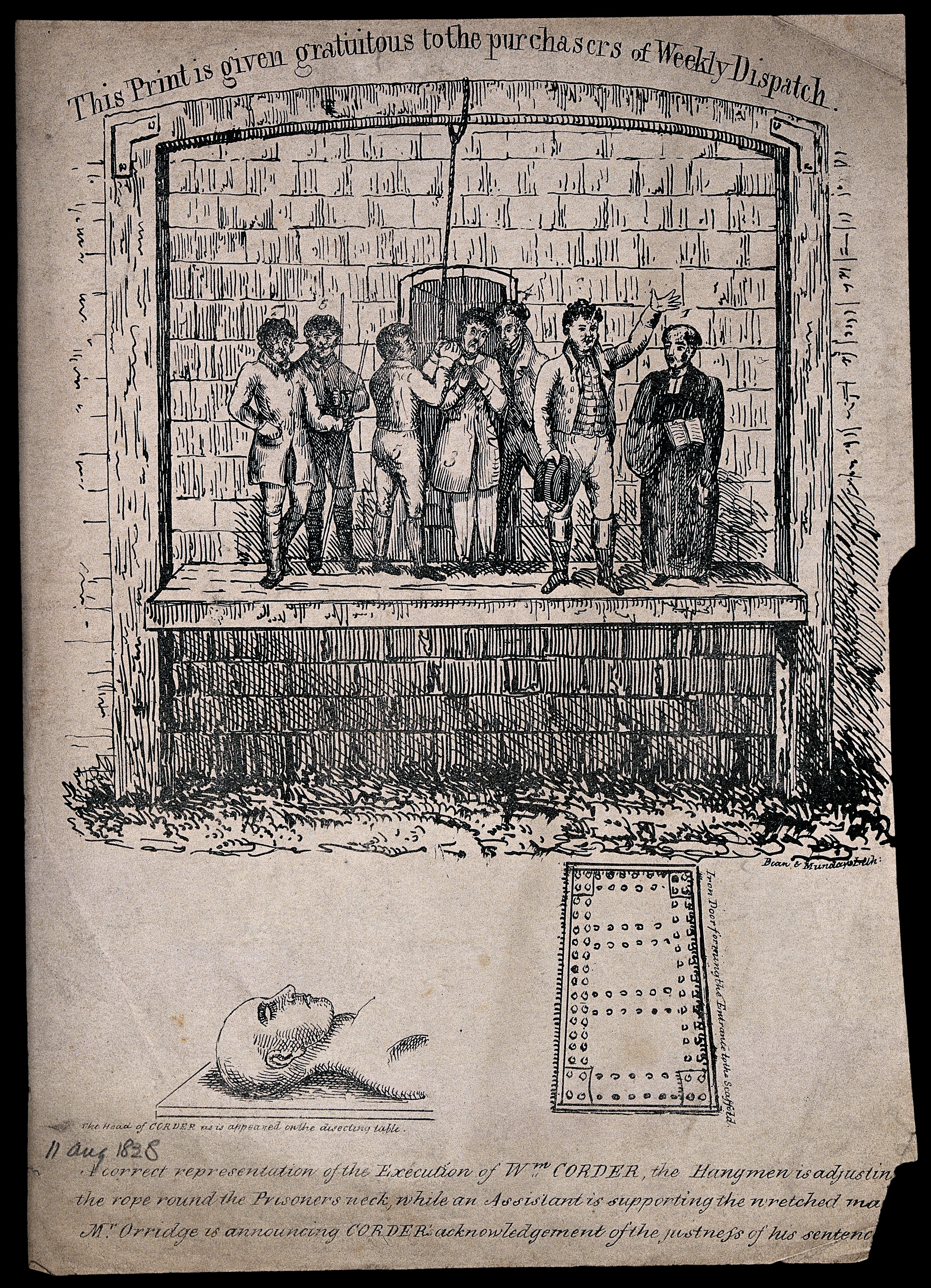
The hangman adjusts the rope around Corder's neck

The following day, the dissection and post-mortem were carried out in front of an audience of students from Cambridge University and physicians. Reports circulated around Bury St Edmunds that a "galvanic battery" had been brought from Cambridge, and it is likely that the group experimented with galvanism on the body; a battery was attached to Corder's limbs to demonstrate the contraction of the muscles. The sternum was opened and the internal organs examined. There was some discussion as to whether the cause of death was suffocation; it was reported that Corder's chest was seen to rise and fall for several minutes after he had dropped, and it was thought probable that pressure on the spinal cord had killed him. The skeleton was to be reassembled after the dissection and it was not possible to examine the brain, so the surgeons contented themselves with a phrenological examination of Corder's skull. The skull was asserted to be profoundly developed in the areas of "secretiveness, acquisitiveness, destructiveness, philoprogenitiveness, and imitativeness" with little evidence of "benevolence or veneration".

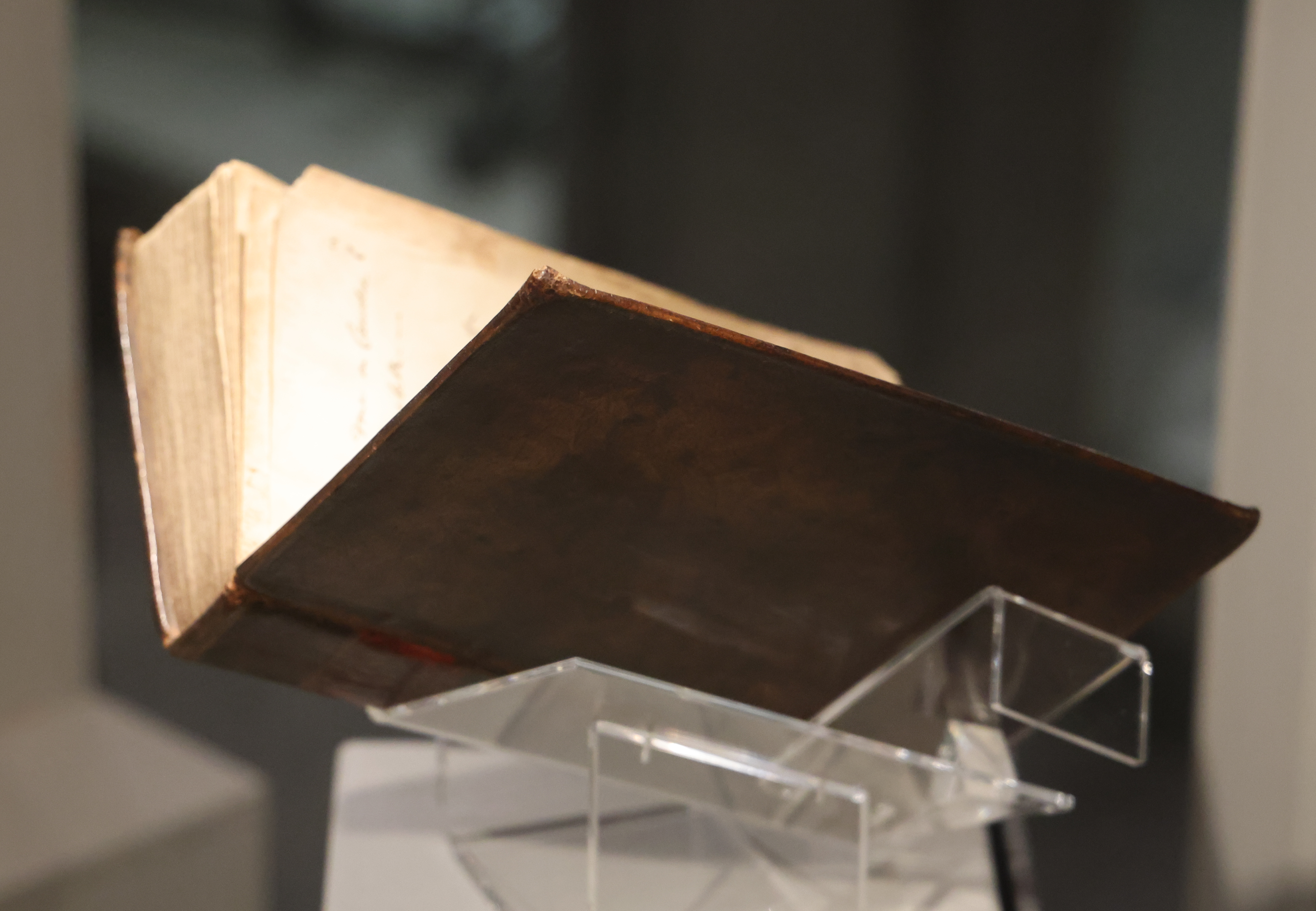
An Authentic and Faithful History of the Mysterious Murder of Maria Marten by James Curtis, bound in Corder's skin

Several copies of Corder's death mask were made and replicas are held at Moyse's Hall Museum and in the dungeons of Norwich Castle. His widow advertised for sale the glasses he purportedly wore at the trial and a snuff box with Marten's likeness. Artefacts from the trial, some of which were in Corder's possession, are also held at the museum. Corder's skin was tanned by surgeon George Creed and used to bind an account of the murder.^{[b]} The book, together with another also part bound using Corder's skin, is on display at Moyse's Hall Museum. In 2025, a second book, was discovered at Moyse's Hall Museum; this copy, donated decades ago, utilized Corder's skin in the binding and the edges.

Corder's skeleton was reassembled, exhibited and used as a teaching aid in the West Suffolk Hospital. The skeleton was put on display in the Hunterian Museum in the Royal College of Surgeons of England, where it hung beside that of Jonathan Wild. In 2004, Corder's bones were removed and cremated.

== Rumours ==
After the trial, doubts were raised about both the story of Ann Marten's dreams and the fate of Corder and Maria Marten's child. Ann was only a year older than Maria, and it was suggested that she and Corder had been having an affair and that the two had planned the murder to dispose of Maria so that it could continue without hindrance. Ann's dreams had started only a few days after Corder married Moore, and it was suggested that jealousy was the motive for revealing the body's resting place and that the dreams were a simple subterfuge.

Further rumours circulated about the death of Corder and Marten's child. Both claimed that they had taken their dead child to be buried in Sudbury, but no records of this could be discovered and no trace was found of the child's burial site. In his written confession, Corder admitted that he and Marten had argued on the day of the murder over the possibility of the burial site being discovered.

In 1967, Donald McCormick wrote The Red Barn Mystery, which brought out a connection between Corder and forger and supposed serial killer Thomas Griffiths Wainewright when the former was in London. According to McCormick, Caroline Palmer, an actress who was appearing frequently in a melodrama based on the Red Barn case and had been researching the murder, concluded that Corder may have not killed Marten, but that a local gypsy woman might have been the killer. However, McCormick's research has been brought into question on other police- and crime-related stories, and this information has not been generally accepted.

== Popular interest ==
The case captured the interest of the public and inspired plays, songs, and other forms of popular entertainment.

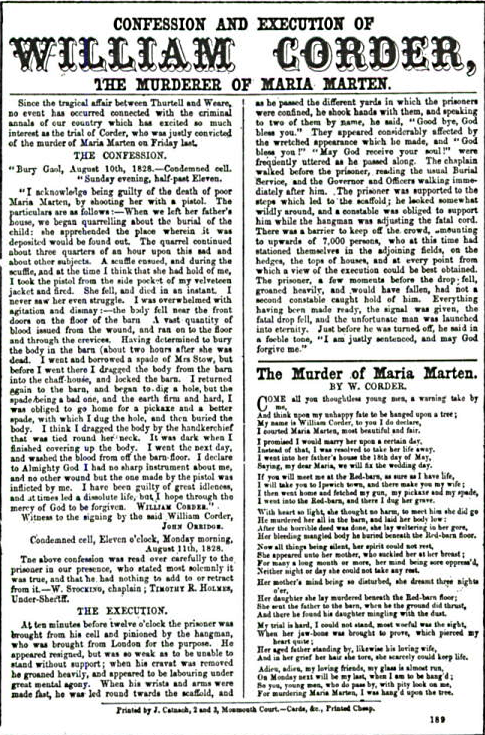
James Catnach's broadside sold well over a million copies

Plays were being performed while Corder was still awaiting trial, and an anonymous author published a melodramatic version of the murder after the execution, a precursor of the Newgate novels which quickly became best-sellers. The Red Barn Murder was a popular subject, along with the story of Jack Sheppard and other highwaymen, thieves and murderers, for penny gaffs, cheap plays performed in the back rooms of public houses. James Catnach sold more than a million broadsides^{[c]} (sensationalist single sheet newspapers) which gave details of Corder's confession and execution, and included a sentimental ballad supposedly written by Corder himself (though more likely to have been the work of Catnach or somebody in his employ). It was one of at least five ballads about the crime that appeared directly following the execution.

Many different versions of the events were set down and distributed due to the excitement around the trial and the public demand for entertainments based on the murder, making it hard for modern readers to discern fact from melodramatic embellishment. Good official records exist from the trial, and the best record of the events surrounding the case is generally considered to be that of James Curtis, a journalist who spent time with Corder and two weeks in Polstead interviewing those concerned. He was apparently so connected with the case that a newspaper artist who was asked to produce a picture of the accused man drew a likeness of Curtis instead of Corder.

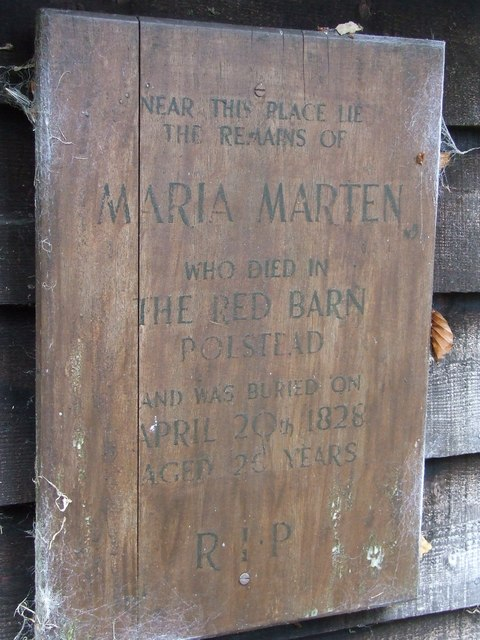
Memorial to Maria Marten in the churchyard of St Mary's, Polstead

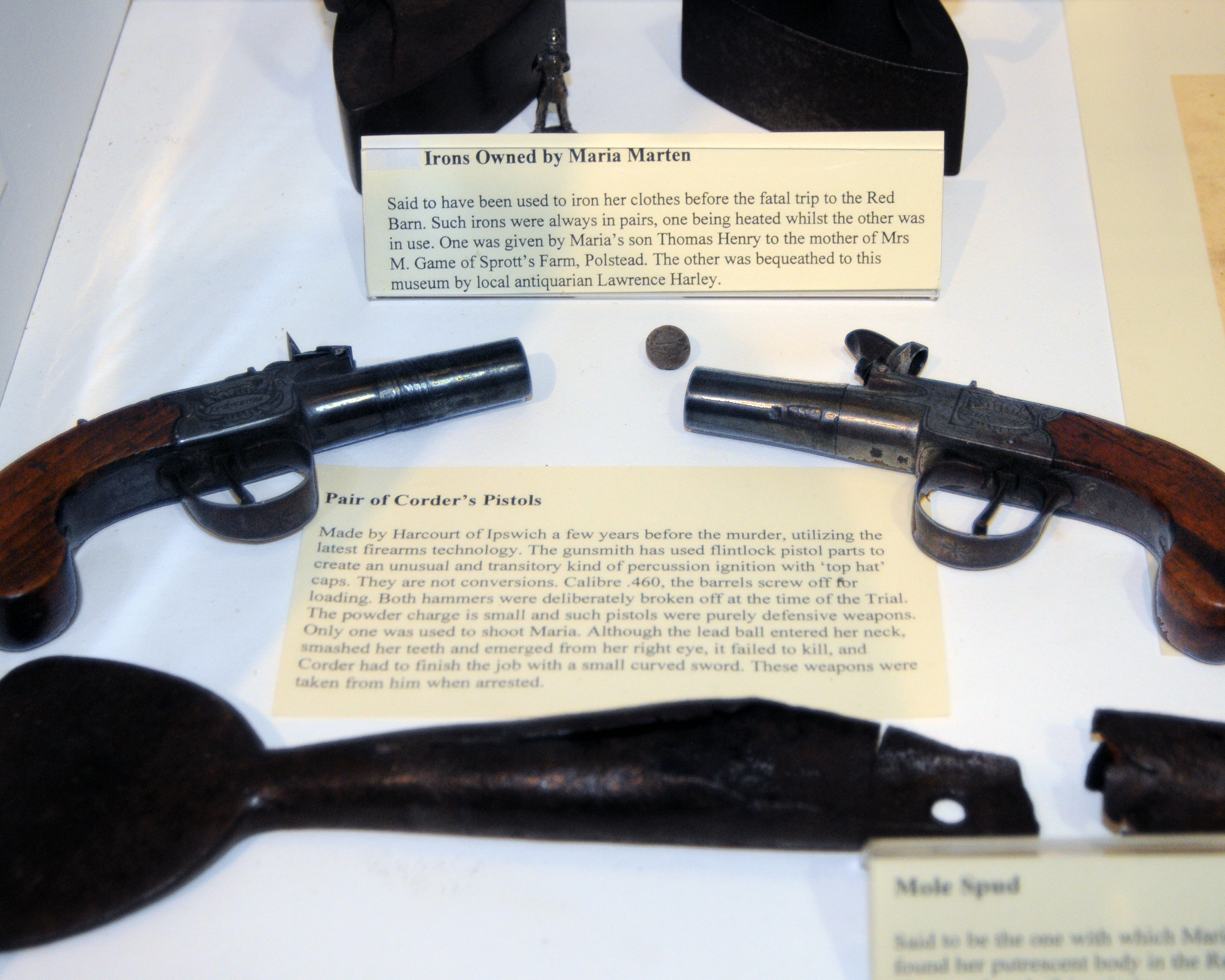
Red Barn Murder exhibit at Moyse's Hall, Bury St Edmunds

Pieces of the rope which was used to hang Corder sold for a guinea each. Part of his scalp with an ear still attached was displayed in a shop on Oxford Street. A lock of Marten's hair sold for two guineas. Polstead became a tourist venue, with visitors travelling from as far afield as Ireland; Curtis estimated that 200,000 people visited Polstead in 1828 alone. The Red Barn and the Martens' cottage excited particular interest. The barn was stripped for souvenirs, down to the planks being removed from the sides, broken up and sold as toothpicks. It was slated to be demolished after the trial, but it was left standing and eventually burned down in 1842.^{[d]} Even Marten's gravestone in the churchyard of St Mary's, Polstead, was eventually chipped away to nothing by souvenir hunters; only a sign on the shed now marks the approximate place where it stood, although her name is given to Marten's Lane in the village. Pottery models and sketches were sold and songs were composed, including one quoted in the Vaughan Williams opera Hugh the Drover and Five Variants of Dives and Lazarus.

Corder's skeleton was put on display in a glass case in the West Suffolk Hospital, and apparently was rigged with a mechanism that made its arm point to the collection box when approached. Eventually, the skull was removed by Dr. John Kilner, who wanted to add it to his extensive collection of Red Barn memorabilia. After a series of unfortunate events, Kilner became convinced that the skull was cursed and handed it on to a friend named Hopkins. Further disasters plagued both men, and they finally paid for the skull to be given a Christian burial in an attempt to lift the supposed curse.

Interest in the case did not quickly fade. The play Maria Marten, or The Murder in the Red Barn existed in various anonymous versions; it was a sensational hit throughout the mid-19th century and may have been the most performed play of the time. Victorian fairground peep shows were forced to add extra apertures for their viewers when exhibiting their shows of the murder. The plays of the Victorian era tended to portray Corder as a cold-blooded monster and Marten as the innocent whom he preyed upon; her reputation and her children by other fathers were airbrushed out, and Corder was made into an older man. Charles Dickens published an account of the murder in his magazine All the Year Round after initially rejecting it because he felt the story to be too well known and the account of the stepmother's dreams rather far-fetched.

=== Folk song ===
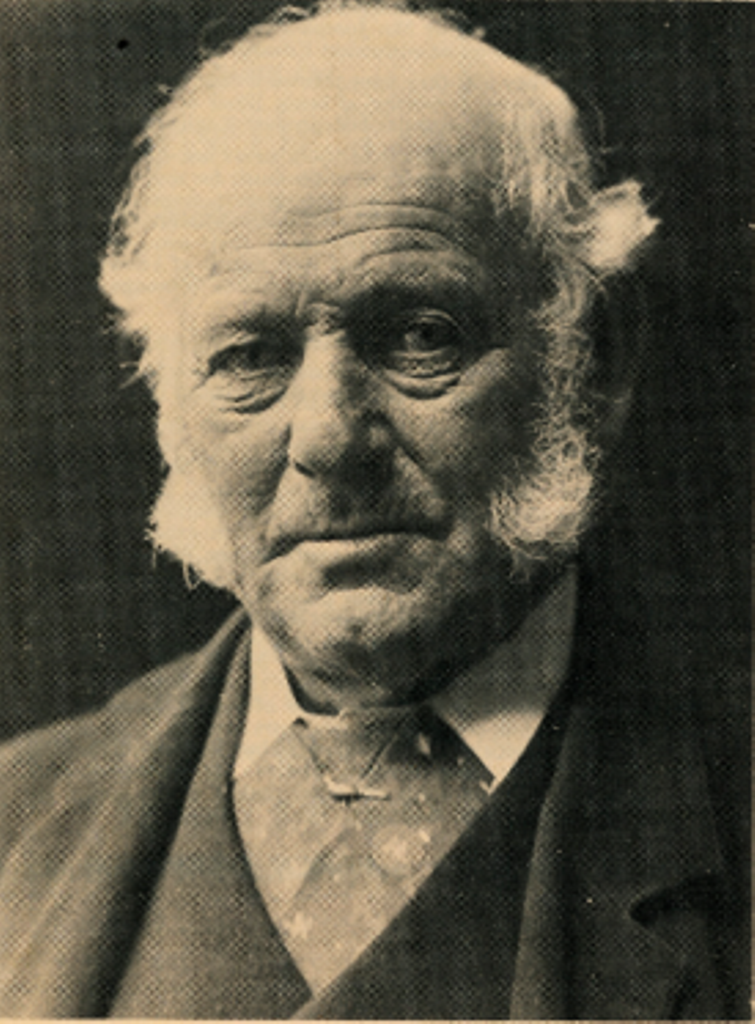
Joseph Taylor was recorded singing part of the folk song "The Murder of Maria Martin" in 1908

The folk song "Maria Martin" or "The Murder of Maria Martin" (Roud 215) tells the story of the murder. The Lincolnshire folk singer Joseph Taylor sang a fragment of the song to Percy Grainger in 1908. Grainger recorded the performance on a wax cylinder, which has been digitised and can be heard via the British Library Sound Archive website. Taylor sings the following lyrics, to the tune of Dives and Lazarus:

'"If you'll meet me at the Red Barn as sure as I have life
I will take you to Ipswich Town and there make you my wife."
This lad went home and fetched his gun, his pick-axe and his spade.
He went unto the Red Barn and there he dug her grave.
With her heart so light she thought no harm, to meet her love did go
He murdered her all in the barn and he laid her body low

Several other versions of the song were recorded, including one from Billy List of Brundish, Suffolk, which can also be heard on the British Library Sound Archive website. These recordings appear to be based on popular versions printed on broadsides in the mid-19th century.

=== Twentieth century ===
Public fascination continued into the 20th century with five film versions, including Maria Marten, or The Murder in the Red Barn (1935) starring Tod Slaughter,^{[e]} and the BBC drama Maria Marten (1980), with Pippa Guard in the title role. The story has been dramatised for radio a number of times, including two radio dramas by Slaughter (one broadcast on the BBC Regional Programme in 1934, and one broadcast on the BBC Home Service in 1939), a fictionalised account of the murder produced in 1953 for the CBS radio series Crime Classics, entitled "The Killing Story of William Corder and the Farmer's Daughter" and "Hanging Fire", a BBC Monday Play by Lisa Evans broadcast in 1990 telling the story of the events leading up to the murder as seen through the eyes of Marten's sister Ann. Christopher Bond wrote The Mysterie of Maria Marten and the Murder in the Red Barn in 1991, a melodramatic stage version with some political and folk-tale elements. The folk singer Shirley Collins and the Albion Country Band recorded a song in 1971 entitled "Murder of Maria Marten" on their album No Roses. A part of the song is performed by Florence Pugh in the 2018 television dramatisation of John le Carré's The Little Drummer Girl.

== See also ==
- Greenbrier Ghost, an American murder case in which the murderer was allegedly revealed by the victim's ghost
- Anthropodermic bibliopegy

== Notes ==
a. Moore's first name is occasionally reported as Maria but an inscription in Corder's journal and later reports make it clear she was called Mary. The initial newspaper reports said that she had seen Corder's advertisement in a pastry shop window. Whether this is true or not is unknown, but Corder had certainly received replies for his advertisement in The Times, a number of which can be found in Curtis' account of the case.

b. The account of the case bound in Corder's tanned skin is held at Moyse's Hall Museum and contains a hand-written account of a witticism on the inside cover: on the night of the execution, during a performance of Macbeth at Drury Lane, when the line "Is execution done on Cawdor?" was spoken, a man shouted from the gallery "Yes! – He was hung this morning at Bury"

c. Accounts of how many were sold vary but are consistently quoted as either 1,160,000 or 1,600,000. Catnach claimed it had sold over 1,650,000.

d. In November 2007 a report of a fire that nearly destroyed Marten's cottage was on the front page of the East Anglian Daily Times. Firefighters saved 80% of the thatched roof at Marten's former home after a chimney fire threatened the "iconic Suffolk cottage", now run as a bed and breakfast.

e. In Britain the script was submitted to the British Board of Film Censors who passed it on the condition that the execution scene was cut. The scene was filmed anyway, but the Board demanded it be removed before the film was passed. In the U.S., scenes emphasising Maria's pregnancy, and featuring the words slut and wench were cut, and the scene of her burial shortened. Virginia and Ohio made further cuts to the versions they approved for distribution.
