= Greenbrier Ghost =

Purported ghost of murdered American woman

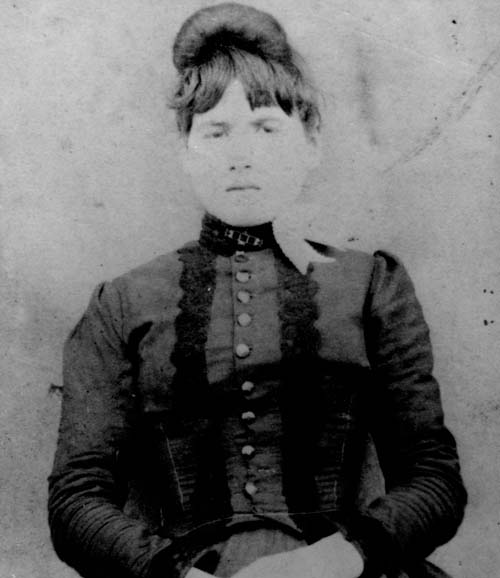
Elva Zona Heaster Shue, murder victim

The Greenbrier Ghost is the name popularly given to the ghost of Elva Zona Heaster Shue, a young woman in Greenbrier County, West Virginia, United States, who was murdered in 1897. Initially judged a death by natural causes, the court later declared that the woman had been murdered by her husband, following testimony by the victim's mother, Mary Jane Heaster, in which she claimed that her daughter's spirit revealed the true cause of death.

== Murder ==
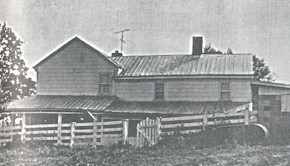
The house where the murder took place

In October 1896, Elva Zona Heaster (who went by her middle name Zona) met a blacksmith named Edward Stribbling Trout Shue (who also used the names Erastus and Erasmus). The two married soon afterwards, and Zona took his surname.

On January 23, 1897, Zona Shue was found dead in her home. A coroner's jury rendered a verdict of "death by heart disease". She was buried on January 24, 1897, in the local cemetery now known as the Soule Chapel Methodist Cemetery.

Her mother, Mary Jane Heaster, later claimed to have been contacted by Zona's spirit at a seance. According to Mary Jane's story, Zona insisted that Edward had killed her by breaking her neck.

== Exhumation and autopsy ==
Armed with the story allegedly told to her by the ghost, Mary Jane Heaster visited the local prosecutor, John Alfred Preston, and spent several hours in his office convincing him to reopen the matter of her daughter's death. Whether he believed her story of the ghost is unknown, but he did have enough doubt to dispatch deputies to reinterview several people of interest in the case, including Dr. Knapp. He was likely responding to public sentiment, as numerous locals had begun suggesting that Zona had been murdered.

Preston himself went to speak to Dr. Knapp, who stated that he had not made a complete examination of the body. This was viewed as sufficient justification for an autopsy, and an exhumation was ordered and an inquest jury formed.

Zona's body was examined on February 22, 1897, in the local one-room schoolhouse, and the autopsy lasted three hours. It was found that Zona's neck had been broken. According to the report, published on March 9, 1897, "the discovery was made that the neck was broken and the windpipe mashed. On the throat were the marks of fingers indicating that she had been choked. The neck was dislocated between the first and second vertebrae. The ligaments were torn and ruptured. The windpipe had been crushed at a point in front of the neck." Shue was arrested and charged with the murder of his wife.

== Trial ==
Edward Shue was held in the jail in Lewisburg while waiting for the trial to begin. During this time, more information about his past was coming to light. He had been married twice before: his first marriage had ended in divorce, with his wife accusing him of great cruelty; his second wife had died under mysterious circumstances less than a year after they were married. Zona was his third wife, and Shue began to talk of wishing to wed seven women; he freely spoke of this ambition while in jail, and told reporters that he was sure he would be let free because there was so little evidence against him.

The trial began on June 22, 1897, and Mary Jane Heaster was Preston's star witness. He confined his questioning to the known facts of the case, skirting the issue of her ghostly sightings. Perhaps hoping to prove her unreliable, Shue's lawyer questioned Mrs. Heaster extensively about her daughter's visits on cross-examination. The tactic backfired when Mrs. Heaster would not waver in her account despite intense badgering. As the defense had introduced the issue, the judge found it difficult to instruct the jury to disregard the story of the ghost, and many people in the community seemed to believe it.

Consequently, Shue was found guilty of first degree murder on July 11. He was sentenced to life in prison after the jury recommended mercy. However, "the Greenbrier ghost was never mentioned by the prosecution and played no part in the case against Shue".

A lynch mob was formed to take him from the jail and hang him, but the mob was disbanded by the deputy sheriff before any damage was done. Four of the mob's organizers later faced charges for their actions.

== Aftermath ==
Edward Shue died on March 13, 1900, in West Virginia State Penitentiary in Moundsville, the victim of an unknown epidemic. He was buried in an unmarked grave in the local cemetery.

== State historical marker ==
The state of West Virginia has erected a state historical marker near the cemetery in which Zona Shue is buried. It reads:

Interred in nearby cemetery is Zona Heaster Shue. Her death in 1897 was presumed natural until her spirit appeared to her mother to describe how she was killed by her husband Edward. Autopsy on the exhumed body verified the apparition's account. Edward, found guilty of murder, was sentenced to the state prison. Only known case in which testimony from a ghost helped convict a murderer.

== In popular culture ==
Thomas Critchfield, Professor at Illinois State University, made E. Z. H. Shue a co-author for a behavior analytic experiment regarding the 'Dead Man's Test' (i.e., if a dead man can do it, it's not behavior). The article, The Dead Man Test: a Preliminary Experimental Analysis, was published in 2018 in the journal, Behavior Analysis in Practice (formerly known as The Behavior Analyst). Critchfield listed author Zona Shue's location information as "Soule Chapel Methodist Church, Smoot, WV USA."

Katie Letcher Lyle, a writer and an amateur historian, in her book The Man Who Wanted Seven Wives: The Greenbrier Ghost and the Famous Murder Mystery of 1897, gave a dramatized account of the Greenbrier Ghost. Lyle explained her conclusion in a 1999 issue of Wonderful West Virginia magazine in which she said that Mary had probably made up the story of the ghost in order to make a compelling argument to open up her daughter's case. She said, "Mary knew [Shue] to be clever, unprincipled, and persuasive. If he'd murdered once, he could murder again. Perhaps she feared that if no one validated her accusations, Shue would prove extremely dangerous. So pretending to receive the news directly from Zona, she could appeal to the superstitions of her mountaineer neighbors and get a lot of public attention. As it turned out, she didn't need the ghost story, for Shue was convicted, according to every account, strictly on earthly considerations, without any unearthly ghosts."

The story of the Greenbrier Ghost is the subject of four stage adaptations. Jan Buttram's play Zona was produced in 1998 by Greenbrier Valley Theatre, the state professional theatre of West Virginia. Karen Benelli's “The Ghost of Greenbrier County” was produced in 2004 at the New York Fringe Festival by the Rising Sun Theatre Co. The Greenbrier Ghost, a full-length musical adaptation, was written by Cathey Sawyer (book and lyrics) and Joe Buttram (music). The show premiered in 2003 at Greenbrier Valley Theatre, with subsequent productions in 2004, 2009, 2013, 2019, and 2026. Another full-length musical adaptation of this story is Greenbrier, 1897, written and performed by the Lovewell Institute for the Creative Arts. The musical debuted on June 28, 2018, and had performances on June 28-June 30 of 2018.

The Unquiet Grave, a 2017 novel by Sharyn McCrumb, is based on the Greenbrier case.

The Comedy Central show Drunk History profiled the Greenbrier Ghost and subsequent trial in the 2019 episode "Believe It or Not" (season 6 episode 9).

An opera based on the Greenbrier case, Everlasting Faint, made its world premier in Madison, WI on December 9, 2023. It featured a libretto by Sandra Flores-Strand and music by Scott Gendel.

== See also ==
- List of ghosts
- Red Barn Murder, an English murder case where the murderer was allegedly revealed by the victim's ghost.
