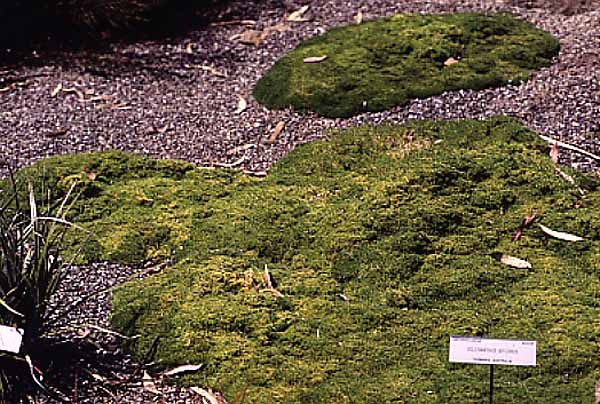

Scientific classification
- Kingdom: Plantae
- Clade: Tracheophytes
- Clade: Angiosperms
- Clade: Eudicots
- Order: Caryophyllales
- Family: Caryophyllaceae
- Genus: Scleranthus
- Species: S. biflorus

Binomial name
- Scleranthus biflorus (J.R.Forst. & G.Forst.) Hook.f.

= Scleranthus biflorus =

Species of flowering plant

Scleranthus biflorus is a cushion-bush found in Australia and New Zealand. Other common names include the knawel and two-flowered knawel or twin-flower knawel.

A common plant in grassland, particularly at higher altitudes. It may be in the form of a mat. Or a multi branched, spreading perennial herb. As of 2015, this species was under review, and new taxa were planned.

== Description ==
A spreading, moss-like plant with dense, bright green, linear leaves about 4mm long. There are minute, double-headed green flowers in late spring. Propagation can be by division or by seed. The fungus Rhizoctonia can cause dead brown patches in this species.
