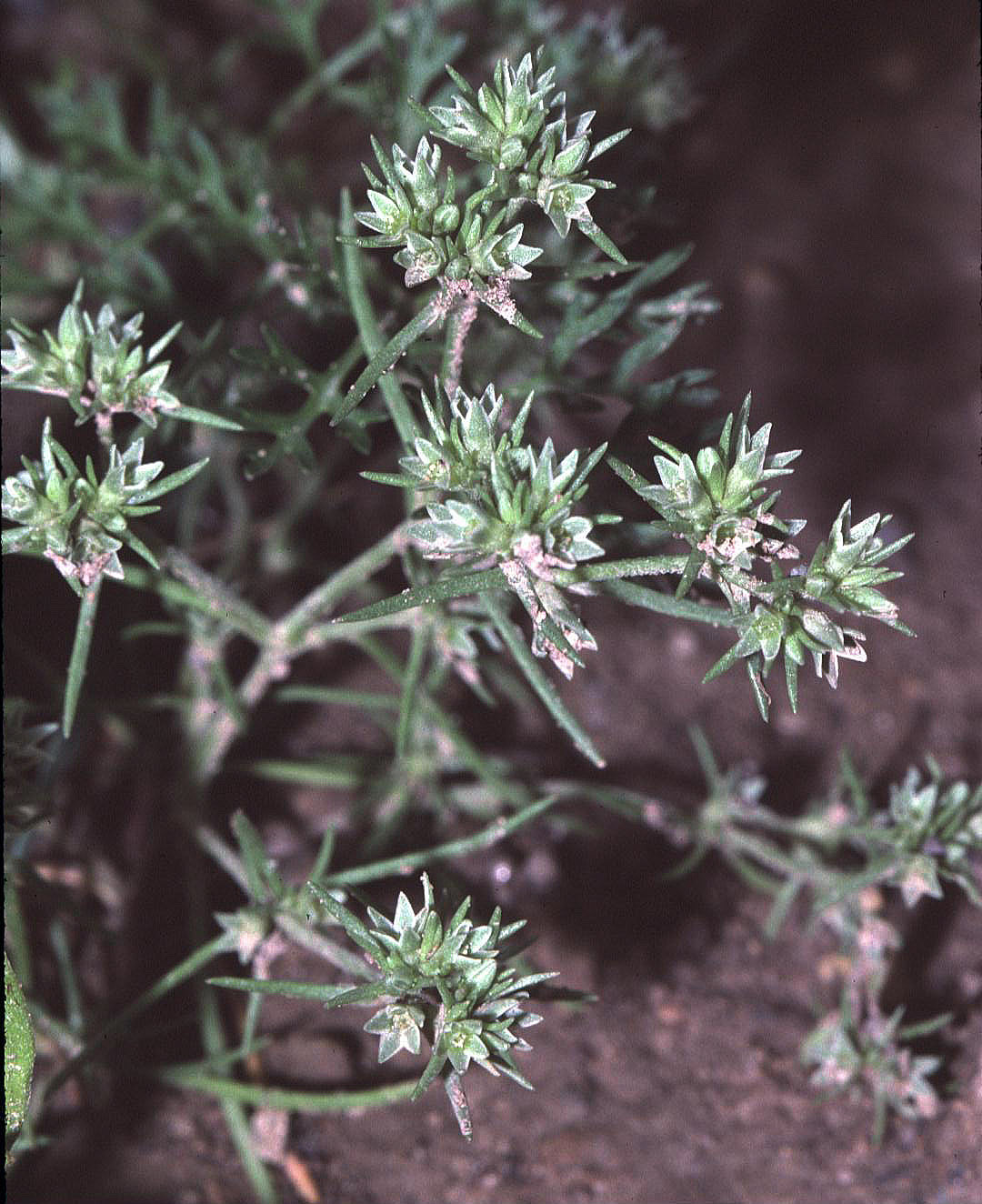

Scientific classification
- Kingdom: Plantae
- Clade: Tracheophytes
- Clade: Angiosperms
- Clade: Eudicots
- Order: Caryophyllales
- Family: Caryophyllaceae
- Genus: Scleranthus
- Species: S. annuus

Binomial name
- Scleranthus annuus L.

= Scleranthus annuus =

Species of flowering plant

Scleranthus annuus is a species of flowering plant in the family Caryophyllaceae known by the common names German knotweed and annual knawel. It is native to Europe, Asia, and North Africa, and it is known throughout the rest of the temperate world as an introduced species and a common weed. It grows in many types of habitat, often in disturbed areas.

== Description ==
Scleranthus annuus is an annual or biennial herb with low, much-branched spreading stems up to 15 cm (6 in) long growing from a taproot. The leaves are needle-like or linear in shape with sharp, stiff points. They are oppositely arranged in pairs about the stem and are fused together at the bases. Flowers occur in pairs or small clusters of up to five. The flowers lack petals but have bell-shaped calyces of green petal-shaped sepals.

== Distribution and habitat ==
It grows in soil pockets among rocks, on bare places, on disturbed sandy soil on heaths, in arable fields, in sand pits, in quarries, and occasionally on shingle on the coast or beside rivers.

== Life cycle ==
The plant seems to have three different life strategies; some seeds germinate in the autumn and overwinter as small seedlings; others overwinter as seeds and germinate in the spring, flowering the same year; and some germinate in the spring but do not flower until the following year. The flowering period for all three groups extends from late May to late August. The flowers make little effort to attract insects for pollination (no showy petals, little nectar), and most are self-pollinated.

== Status ==
This plant is in decline in many of its previous habitats and is no longer present in many inland sites in Britain and Ireland. This may be due to changes in agriculture practices. It is listed in the Great Britain Vascular Plant Red Data List as endangered and is listed as a Northern Ireland Priority Species.
