= Moyse's Hall =

Norman building in Bury St Edmunds, Suffolk, England, probable Jewish merchant house

Moyse’s Hall
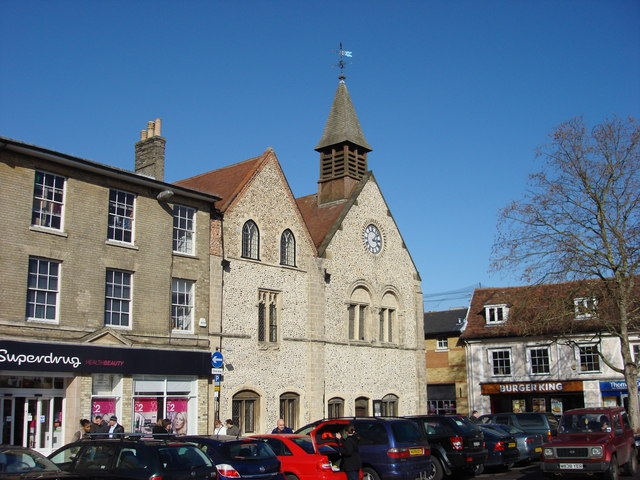

- Location within Suffolk
- 52.2463°N 0.7130°E
- Location: Bury St Edmunds, Suffolk

History
- Built: ca. 1180

Site notes
- Architectural style: Norman architecture

Listed Building – Grade I
- Designated: 7 August 1952
- Reference no.: 1076931

Moyse's Hall is a building in the Suffolk town of Bury St Edmunds. It is a Grade I listed building and is thought to have been originally built circa 1180. It is probable but not certain that it was a Jewish merchant's house. In 1895, before it became a museum, part was in use by the Great Eastern Railway as a Parcel Receiving and Enquiry Office, with another section being incorporated into the Castle Hotel. It has also been used as the town's jail, police station, and as a workhouse.

== Probable identification as a Jewish merchant's house ==
The early usage of Moyse's Hall is often said to have been as a "Jew's house"; more recent opinion tends towards this view, but it cannot be confirmed. The tradition that it was a synagogue however seems unlikely. The earliest known usage of the name is in 1328, when it is noted by scribes in the phrase "ad aulam Moysii" (at the Hall of Moyse). Subsequent uses in records and locally carried this tradition into the nineteenth century, but the origin of the building and its name became a topic of controversy among Jewish scholars and the Anglo-Jewish community in 1895–96, when the building was for sale, just before it became a museum. Hermann Gollancz suggested that it was likely to be a Jewish building on the basis of the architectural style and the name evidence and tradition. Frank Haes however objected that no records show a contemporary Jew with this name or similar in Bury St Edmunds and pointed to concurrent gentile families in the area bearing the name of Moys, Moises, Mose and Moyse. Overall, a panel of academics concluded that the evidence in favour of it being Jewish owned were not strong and found Haes' evidence about local names convincing.

In 1973, however, Edgar Samuel argued that its size and location near a market make it unlikely to be a synagogue, but concluded that it is "highly probable" that it was owned by a Jewish merchant family. Firstly, he points out that there are simply no records of the Jewish community in which to look for a "Mosheh" or "Mosse". Secondly, stone houses are rare in England except among the Jewish community at the time, who were used to stone houses from France, and found them more secure. (Note: They were also seen as an investment and frequently put in the possession of the wife of the family so that they would have a secure future income from rents or small shopkeeping activities if the husband died.) Thirdly, the building's date of c. 1180 corresponds to the period when the Jews of Bury St Edmunds were at the height of their prosperity. (Note: He also believes it is credible that Jewish merchants might have owned such a building later in the thirteenth century as Jewish merchants often established secondary properties to do business outside of their main community.) Fourthly, the 'ii' of the Latin rendering ad aulam Moysii strongly suggests "Mosheh" or Angevin "Mosse" rather than the monosyllabic English "Mose" or "Moys". (Note: Samuel explains that the "ii" of Moysii suggests a second syllable after the 's', such as the Jewish Hebrew "Mosheh" or Angevin "Mosse" with the Latin genitive (possessive) inflection 'i' added; whereas an English "Mose" or "Moys" has no second syllable, so would render in Latin as Moysi or Moysis.)

== History ==
After the early mentions by chronicles, there is limited evidence to suggest that the building was in use as an inn and tavern from 1300 up to 1600.

The building has undergone several restorations including one in 1858, funded in part by the town municipality, 36 years before the building came into the care of the town. A tower clock was installed in the 1860s. A refurbishment extending the museum into rundown buildings at the rear was carried out in 2000-2002.

=== Museum ===
On 31 May 1899 Lord John Hervey opened the building as Moyse's Hall Museum. Horace Ross Barker was the curator.

The museum is home to the Gershom-Parkington clock collection, and artefacts concerning the Red Barn Murder of 1827, as well as important finds such as an aestel found in Drinkstone. Works by artists such as Mary Beale, Sybil Andrews and Angelica Kauffman are also in the collection.

== See also ==
- Jew's House, Lincoln
