= Polstead =

Village in Suffolk, England

Coordinates: 52.007°N 0.902°E

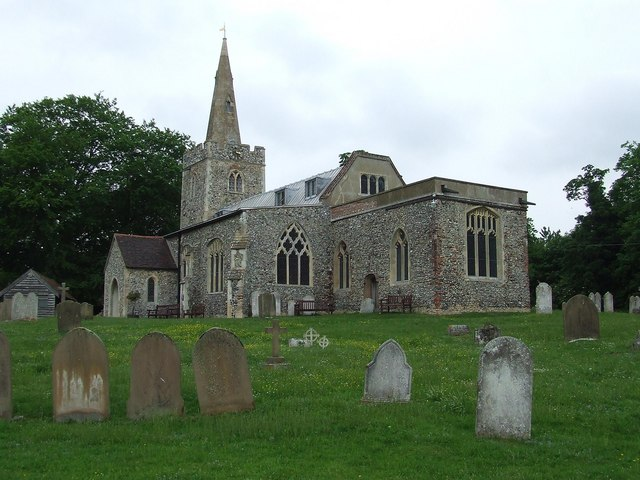
- Church of St Mary, Polstead

- Location within Suffolk
- Population: 851 (2011)
- OS grid reference: TL991374
- Civil parish: Polstead
- District: Babergh
- Shire county: Suffolk
- Region: East
- Country: England
- Sovereign state: United Kingdom
- Post town: Colchester
- Postcode district: CO6
- Dialling code: 01206
- Police: Suffolk
- Fire: Suffolk
- Ambulance: East of England
- UK Parliament: South Suffolk

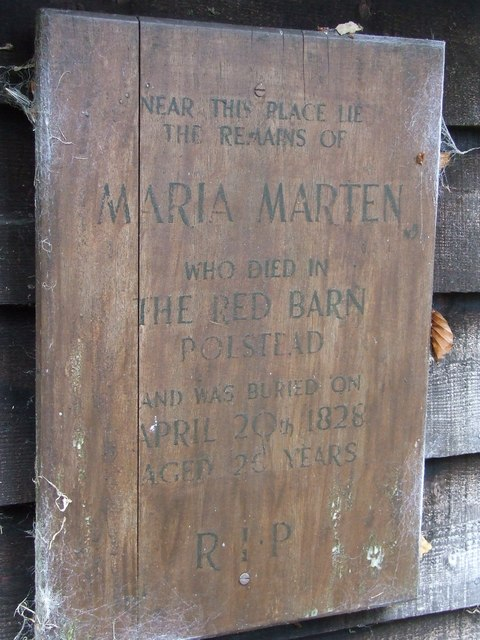
Memorial to Maria Marten

Polstead is a village and civil parish in the Babergh district of Suffolk, England. The village lies 3 miles (4.8 km) northeast of Nayland, 5 miles (8 km) southwest of Hadleigh and 9 miles (14 km) north of Colchester. It is situated on a small tributary stream of the River Stour. In 2011 the parish had a population of 851.

== History ==
The name Polstead is derived from "Place by a pool" There are still two large ponds in the village.

The village was the site of the Red Barn Murder in 1827. The victim Maria Marten was re-buried in the churchyard of St Mary's Church, but her gravestone was subsequently entirely removed by souvenir hunters. Marten is now commemorated by a sign located near to the grave site, and by Marten's Lane which adjoins Water Lane and Mill Street.

The church dates from the 12th century and features some very early English-made bricks. The tower, which is 14th-century, is the only one in Suffolk which still has its original spire, although Pevsner says the spire is later than the tower. The tower at one time contained six bells. The interior of the church contains two brasses, one of which is of a priest and bears a date of 1460.

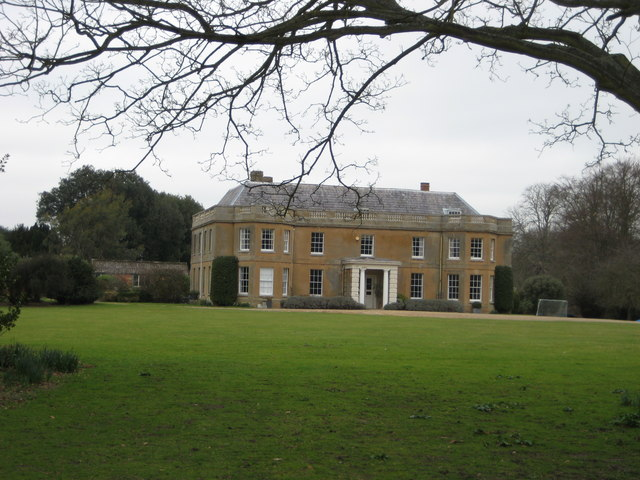
Polstead Hall

Next to the churchyard is Polstead Hall, rebuilt in the Georgian style in about 1819. In the grounds of the hall are the remains of the "Gospel Oak", which finally collapsed in 1953, but which is believed to have been the tree under which Saint Cedd preached to the heathen Anglo-Saxons. A new oak tree has been planted as a replacement.

== Features ==
The main village is situated around Polstead Green and the Hill, although Polstead also comprises several hamlets including Polstead Heath, Hadleigh Heath, Bower House Tye, Bell's Corner, Mill Street and Whitestreet Green. The village has one pub, the 17th century Cock Inn, a community shop and post office and a playing field. The playing field hosts an annual music festival around the summer solstice called "Polstice". In the 19th century a two-day fair was held on Polstead Green. Polstead is famous for its cherries and lends its name to a variety, the Polstead Black. In recent years more Polstead Black cherry trees have been planted in and around the village, as these trees had declined in numbers.

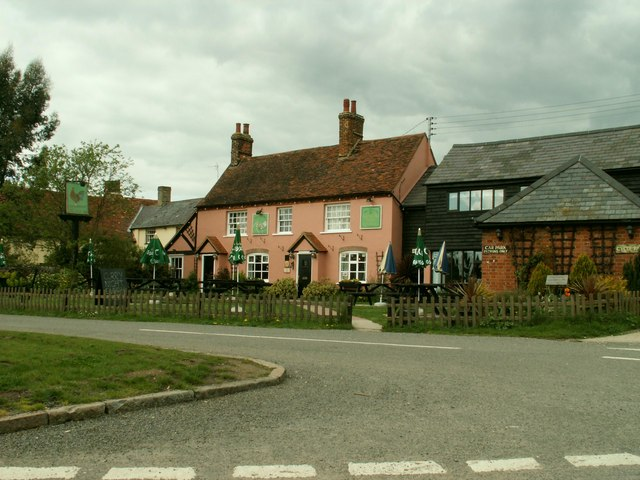
The Cock Inn, scene of the inquest after the 1827 Red Barn Murder

=== Bower House Tye ===
Bower House Tye is a hamlet near the A1071 road within the parish. There are five Listed buildings: Bower House, Brewery Farmhouse, Holly Cottage, Holmwood Cottages 1 and 2 en The Bower Close.

=== Hadleigh Heath ===
A Baptist chapel was erected in Hadleigh Heath in 1801 and was removed to Polstead in 1849.

=== Polstead Heath ===
A primitive Methodist chapel was erected in Polstead Heath in 1838.

== Notable residents ==
- Sir (Frank) Patrick Bishop (1900–1972), advertising copywriter, barrister, businessman and Conservative Party politician
- Eric Buckley (1868–1948), Archdeacon of Sudbury, the first Archdeacon of Ipswich and Rector of Polstead from 1921 to 1945
- Air Chief Marshal Sir Gareth Clayton (1914–1992) senior Royal Air Force officer who served as Air Secretary from 1970 to 1972
- Percy Edwards (1908–1996), animal impersonator, ornithologist and entertainer
- Simon Gales (born 1964), contemporary artist
- R. P. Keigwin (1883–1972), academic and cricketer
- Ruth Rendell, Baroness Rendell of Babergh, CBE (1930-2015), author of thrillers and psychological murder mysteries

== See also ==
- Polstead Road, Oxford, England
