= Eriswell =

Village in Suffolk, England

Coordinates: 52.367°N 0.533°E

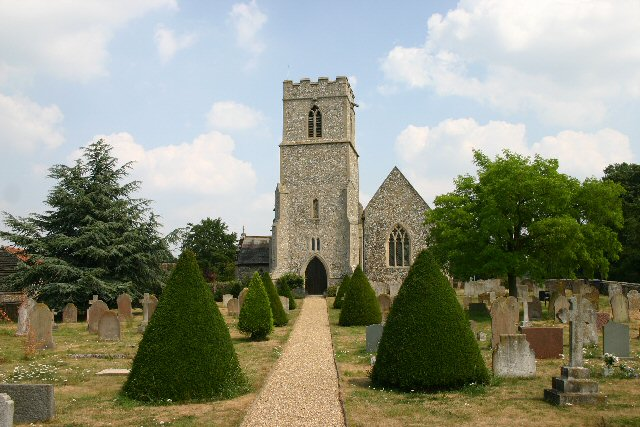
- St Laurence Church, Eriswell

- Location within Suffolk
- Population: 3,101 (2011)
- District: West Suffolk
- Shire county: Suffolk
- Region: East
- Country: England
- Sovereign state: United Kingdom
- Post town: Brandon
- Postcode district: IP27
- UK Parliament: West Suffolk

Eriswell is a village and civil parish of West Suffolk in the English county of Suffolk. In 2011 the parish had a population of 3101.

About forty scattered archaeological finds have been made here, including Bronze Age battle axes, palstaves and rapiers. The greater part of these objects have been entrusted to the Moyse's Hall Museum in Bury St Edmunds while other items are in the Museum of Archaeology and Anthropology in Cambridge. From 1974 to 2019 it was in Forest Heath district.
