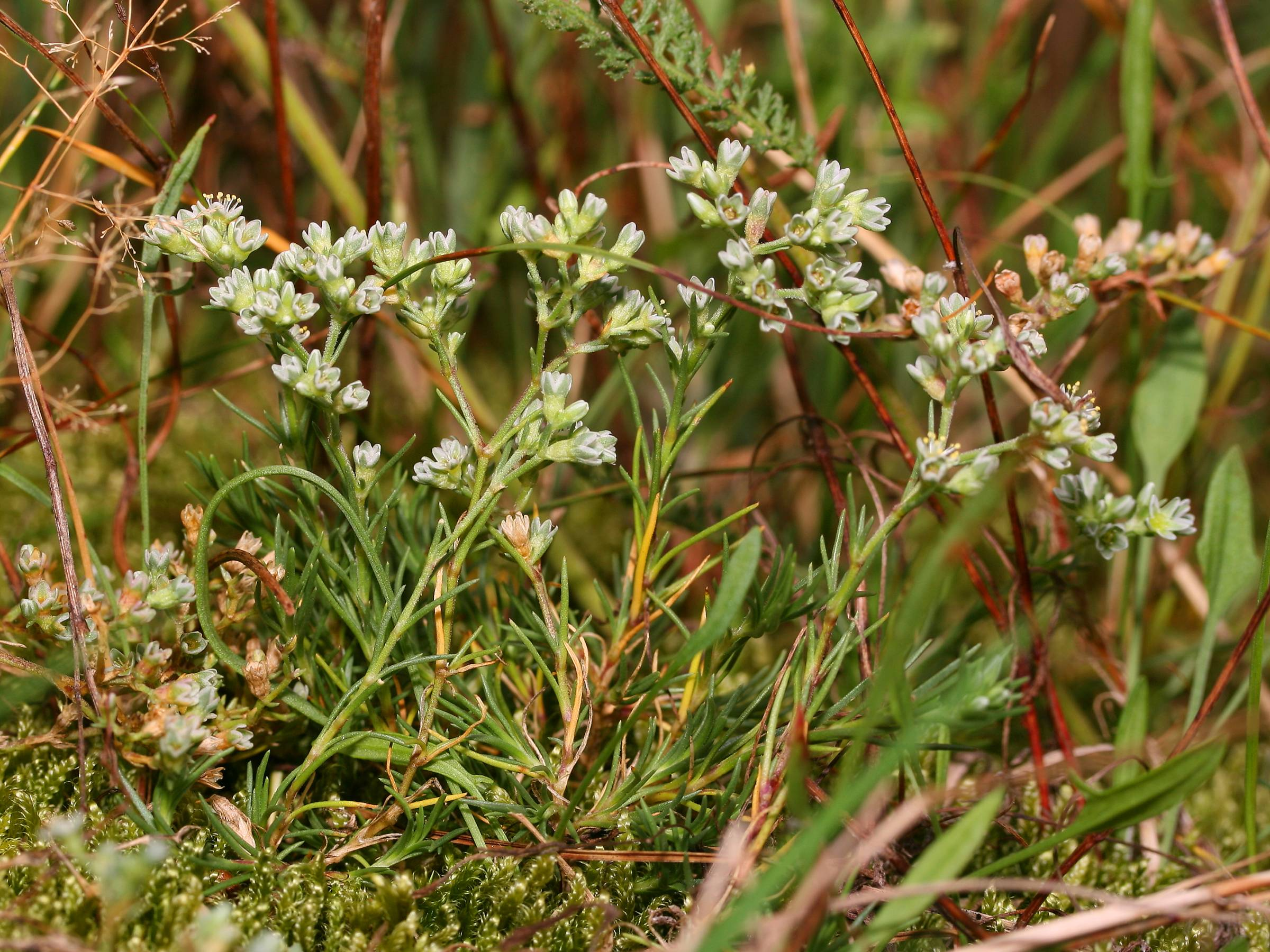

Scientific classification
- Kingdom: Plantae
- Clade: Tracheophytes
- Clade: Angiosperms
- Clade: Eudicots
- Order: Caryophyllales
- Family: Caryophyllaceae
- Genus: Scleranthus
- Species: S. perennis

Binomial name
- Scleranthus perennis L.

= Scleranthus perennis =

Perennial knawel

Species of flowering plant

Scleranthus perennis, the perennial knawel, is a perennial herbaceous plant in the family Caryophyllaceae. It grows on sandy, dry, acidic soils. It can grow up to 15 cm high and has white flowers of 2–5 mm. The plant used to be economically significant as the major host plant of the Polish cochineal.

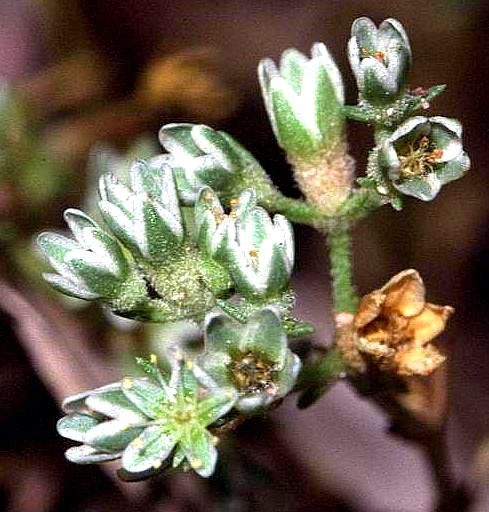
Closeup of flowers
