= Blyth Navigation =

Canal in Suffolk, England

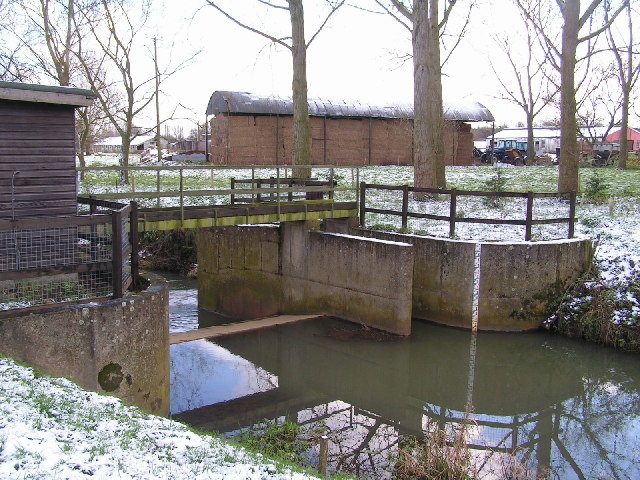
- The modern sluice and gauging station on the River Blyth at Mells, below Mells bridge
- Interactive map of Blyth Navigation

Specifications
- Length: 7 miles (11 km)
- Maximum boat length: 50 ft 0 in (15.24 m)
- Maximum boat beam: 14 ft 0 in (4.27 m)
- Locks: 6 (originally 5)
- Status: Abandoned

History
- Original owner: Southwold Harbour Trustees
- Principal engineer: Langley Edwards
- Date of act: 1757
- Date of first use: 1761
- Date closed: 1911

Geography
- Start point: Halesworth
- End point: Southwold Harbour

The Blyth Navigation was a canal in Suffolk, England, running 7 miles (11 km) from Halesworth to the North Sea at Southwold. It opened in 1761, and was insolvent by 1884. Its demise was accelerated by an attempt to reclaim saltings at Blythburgh, which resulted in the estuary silting up. It was used sporadically until 1911, and was not formally abandoned until 1934.

== History ==
Between Southwold and Walberswick, the mouth of the River Blyth forms a tidal creek, which opens out into a large area of saltings below the first bridge over the river at Blythburgh. The river was navigable to the port of Blythburgh until the 16th century, but navigation was increasingly affected by silting up of the channel. The volume of water which drained from the saltings on every tide kept the mouth of the river scoured, and enabled Southwold to develop as an important, though minor, port.

The idea of making the river navigable beyond Blythburgh was proposed by Thomas Knights in the 1740s. Knights was a brewer from Halesworth, and suggested that Southwold harbour needed to be improved first. An act of Parliament, the Southwold Harbour Act 1746 (20 Geo. 2. c. 14), was obtained to authorise the improvements, which were sufficiently successful that harbour dues more than doubled over the next five years. Knights tried to gain more support for a navigation to Halesworth, and a plan for the navigation, including a branch from Halesworth to Ubbeston was prepared by Benjamin Reeve in 1753. The project which included three locks was costed at £4,614 by John Reynolds in May 1753, but there was a delay before the bill was submitted to Parliament.

River Blyth Navigation Act 1757
- Act of Parliament
- Parliament of Great Britain
- Long title: An Act for making the River Blyth navigable, from Halesworth Bridge, in the County of Suffolk, into the Haven of Southwold.
- Citation: 30 Geo. 2. c. 47
- Territorial extent: Great Britain

Dates
- Royal assent: 1 April 1757
- Commencement: 2 December 1756 (Note: Start of session.)
- Repealed: 11 January 1934
Other legislation
Repealed by	River Blyth Navigation Act Revocation Order 1934

Status: Repealed

Text of statute as originally enacted

Following the granting of the River Blyth Navigation Act 1757 (30 Geo. 2. c. 47) on 1 April 1757, which included additional powers for the Southwold Harbour trustees, a new survey was carried out by Langley Edwards, who estimated the cost at £3,000, which included the purchase of Wenhaston watermill. By 1759, subscriptions had been received from 38 people, mainly from the immediate locality, for a total of £3,600. Having made the estimate, Edwards was responsible for completing the work to that price, but failed to attend most of the meetings which the commissioners called. Despite his elusiveness, the work was completed at a cost of £3,822, and the official opening took place on 23 July 1761.

=== Operation ===
As built, the navigation had four locks while some sources also mention a tidal staunch located above Blythburgh bridge. Southwold Museum show two sections where the winding river channel was bypassed by a new straighter cut, one above Blythburgh bridge and one below, with several minor cuts to remove meanders. They place the tidal staunch just below Blyford bridge, and only show three further locks between there and Halesworth. Their map is based on surveys carried out in 1821 and 1840. Ordnance Survey maps show a lock around 600 yards (550 m) below Blyford bridge, which prevents tides from passing further upstream, a second just above Blyford bridge, a third just upstream of Wenhaston railway bridge, allowing the navigation to bypass Wenhaston corn mill, and a fourth at the start of the New Reach in Halesworth. Earlier 6-inch maps show an additional lock at Mells Bridge, then called Old Chapel Bridge.

From the sea, the navigation followed the River Blyth until it reached the Town River, which it followed to Halesworth Lock. From there, the New Reach took the canal to a wharf at Halesworth, which formed the terminus of the canal. The New Reach joined back up with the Town River a little further to the west, in order to provide the water supply for the locks. The locks were built to allow wherries to use the navigation, and so were 50 by 14 feet (15.2 by 4.3 m). However, they were unusual, in that the side walls curved outwards in the centre, to provide an extra 1.5 feet (0.46 m) of width. So that wherries could reach his maltings, a local maltster named Patrick Stead increased the water levels above the point where the New Reach and the Town River joined, by building an additional lock near the junction.

The day-to-day running of the navigation for the first four years was the responsibility of Samuel Jones, who appears to have overseen the construction of the navigation while Langley Edwards was elsewhere, and who was appointed as lock keeper, toll collector, warehouse keeper and surveyor of works by the commissioners. Each time his contract was to be renewed, they attempted to reduce his salary, and so he left and was replaced by his assistant William Bickers. Tolls over the next thirty years averaged £134 per year

=== Demise ===
In the early 19th century, the saltings below Blythburgh Bridge were reclaimed by the construction of embankments, to prevent them flooding. The plan was poorly thought out, and soon afterwards the condition of Southwold harbour was deteriorating, largely due to the deposition of silt, which made access difficult. The canal engineer John Rennie was asked to advise on a course of action, but although his report of 6 January 1820 pointed to the embanking of the saltings as the cause of the problem, he could offer no acceptable solution. The entrance to the harbour became blocked in 1839, and a further report was prepared by John Wright and James Walker in 1840. They calculated that the embankments surrounding the saltings excluded 5.5 million cubic yards (4.2 million m3) of tidal water on each tide, and thus the scouring effect of the river was considerably reduced.

1879 saw the opening of the Southwold Railway, a narrow gauge line between Southwold and Halesworth, which crossed the navigation near Southwold on a swing bridge. Although lack of capital prevented the construction of a branch from the main line to the navigation at Halesworth and another along the north bank of the river towards Southwold harbour, the railway still had an effect on the navigation, use of which declined until the commissioners advertised that they were no longer deriving any income from it in 1884, and would therefore cease to maintain it. In 1894 the commissioners voted to ask the Board of Trade for a warrant to allow the navigation to be abandoned. Despite this, a trader from Halesworth called Fred Lambert brought a wherry called Star to the river, and carried coal from the harbour at Southwold to Halesworth until 1911. He estimated that the cost of repairing the navigation was £1,000, but he could not raise the money to carry out the work.

River Blyth Navigation Act Revocation Order 1934
- Statutory Rules and Orders
- Parliament of the United Kingdom
- Citation: SR&O 1934/283
- Territorial extent: United Kingdom

Dates
- Made: 11 January 1934
Other legislation
Made under	Land Drainage Act 1930

The Southwold Railway finally built a branch to the harbour in 1914, as part of a plan to relieve congestion of the harbours at Great Yarmouth and Lowestoft during the herring fishing season. The outbreak of war prevented its use for this purpose, although it was useful when coastal defences were being built in the area. The harbour declined until it was sold back to the Southwold Corporation in 1932, while the navigation finally ceased on 19 February 1934, when an order of abandonment, the River Blyth Navigation Act Revocation Order 1934 (SR&O 1934/283), was obtained under section 41 of the Land Drainage Act 1930.

== Remains ==
The swing bridge which carried the railway over the river was widened in 1907, and was removed at the outbreak of World War II. It has since been replaced by a fixed Bailey bridge to provide access on foot to Walberswick. With the demise of the locks, the river levels have fallen, so that it is difficult to imagine that wherries once reached Halesworth. The embankments enclosing the saltings below Blythburgh have been breached, and once more a large inland lake forms when the tide is high. Southwold harbour is used for moorings, and can accommodate 110 boats, while navigation is still possible to Blythburgh, although the Bailey bridge restricts access to smaller boats.

The New Reach in Halesworth has an unusual status. In 1968, Wilfred George the owner of the maltings at the end of the navigation registered the waterway as a village green. The designated area ran from the point at which the New Reach leaves the Town River, just above Maltings Lock, to Halesworth Lock. It includes part of the towpath, and the spur which enabled wherries to reach the maltings from Langleys Quay, which subsequently became a tarmac footpath. In 1993 a community group was set up to turn the New Reach into a resource for the town, but frustration at the difficulties of negotiating water levels and flooding in that year let to the plans being dropped. The section is owned by Waveney District Council.

There have been sporadic efforts to restore the canal for navigation, but the resultant flooding of bordering land has made this unpopular. On 27 May 2016, Gerald Burns canoed from Halesworth to Southwold, carrying a sack of malt in his boat, which he delivered to Adnams Brewery in Southwold. The purpose of the journey was to raise funds for the restoration of New Reach at Halesworth, which played an important part in the industrial history of the town. The New Reach Working Group was formed, and in 2017 launched a working punt named after the maltster Partick Stead. In 2018 they were given a powered brush cutter to assist in maintaining the waterway by the Ipswich Branch of the Inland Waterways Association.

== Points of interest ==
Point	Coordinates (Links to map resources)	OS Grid Ref	Notes
Halesworth wharf	52.3431°N 1.5055°E	TM388774	
Halesworth lock	52.3394°N 1.5132°E	TM394770	
Mells Bridge	52.3373°N 1.5300°E	TM405768	
Blyford Lane bridge	52.3325°N 1.5575°E	TM424764	
Blythburgh A12 bridge	52.3235°N 1.5972°E	TM452755	
Southwold Railway bridge	52.3236°N 1.6590°E	TM494758	
Southwold Harbour	52.3172°N 1.6660°E	TM499748	

== See also ==
Media related to River Blyth, Suffolk at Wikimedia Commons

- Canals of Great Britain

== Bibliography ==
- Boyes, John; Russell, Ronald (1977). The Canals of Eastern England. David and Charles. ISBN 978-0-7153-7415-3.
- Cumberlidge, Jane (2009). Inland Waterways of Great Britain (8th ed.). Imray Laurie Norie and Wilson. ISBN 978-1-84623-010-3.
- Priestley, Joseph (1831). "Historical Account of the Navigable Rivers, Canals, and Railways of Great Britain". Archived from the original on 12 March 2016.
- Taylor, Alan; Tonks, Eric (1965). The Southwold Railway. Ian Allan Publishing. ASIN B0013G7MKG.
