= Wenhaston railway station =

Former railway station in England

Wenhaston
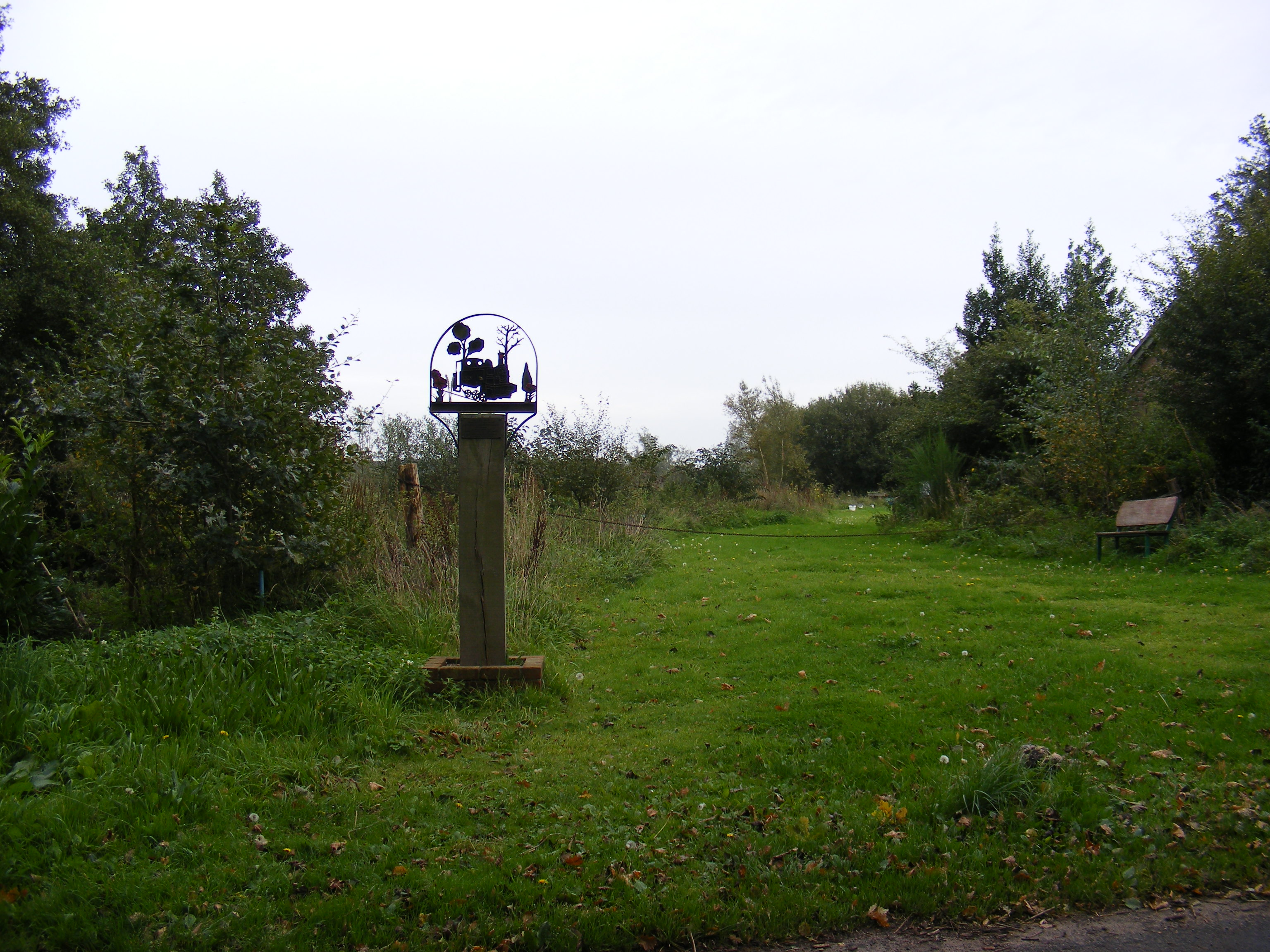
- Station site in 2008

General information
- Location: Wenhaston, East Suffolk; England
- Coordinates: 52.33083°N 1.55761°E
- Grid reference: TM425763
- Platforms: 1

Other information
- Status: Disused

History
- Original company: Southwold Railway

Key dates
- 24 September 1879: Station opened
- 12 April 1929: Station closed
Location

Wenhaston railway station was in Wenhaston, Suffolk. It closed in 1929, 50 years after it had opened for passenger traffic. The Southwold Railway Trust has submitted a planning application to reopen this station as a replica of the original, including 1/2 mile (0.80 km) of 3 ft (914 mm) gauge track heading towards Blythburgh. The plan includes enhancing the landscape and environment for the benefit of wildlife, as well as building a suitable visitor centre.

Preceding station	Disused railways	Following station
Halesworth	Southwold Railway	Blythburgh

== See also ==
- British narrow gauge railways
