= Blythburgh railway station =

Disused railway station in Suffolk, England

Blythburgh
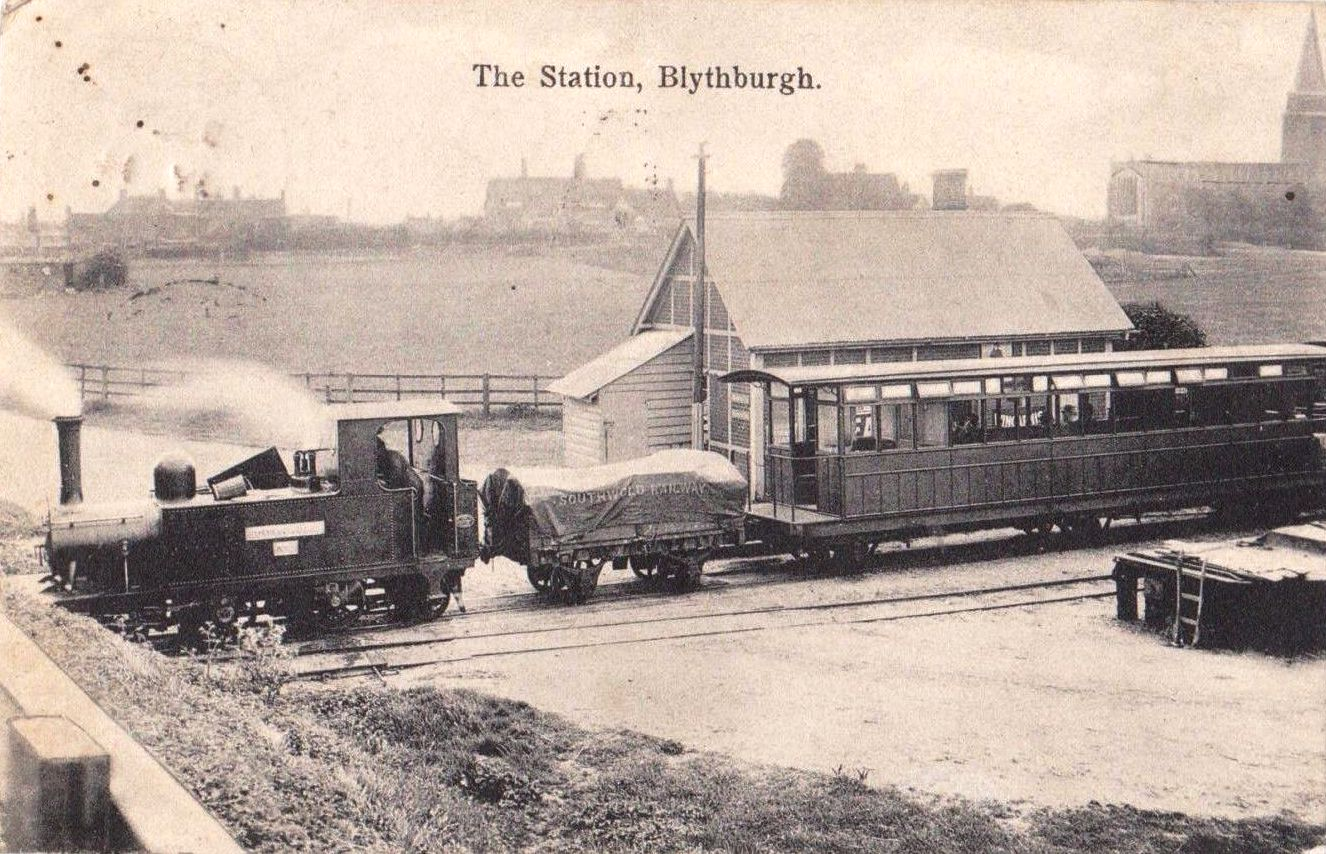

General information
- Location: Blythburgh, East Suffolk; England
- Coordinates: 52.32268°N 1.59679°E
- Grid reference: TM452755
- Platforms: 1

Other information
- Status: Disused

History
- Original company: Southwold Railway

Key dates
- 24 Sep 1879: Station opened
- 12 Apr 1929: Station closed
Location

Blythburgh railway station was located in Blythburgh, Suffolk. The station had two goods sheds. The one shown below is the only remaining building of the Southwold Railway. It closed in 1929, 50 years after it had opened for passenger traffic. The station and a short section of track is being restored by the Halesworth and Southwold Narrow Gauge Railway Society.

Preceding station	Disused railways	Following station
Wenhaston	Southwold Railway	Walberswick

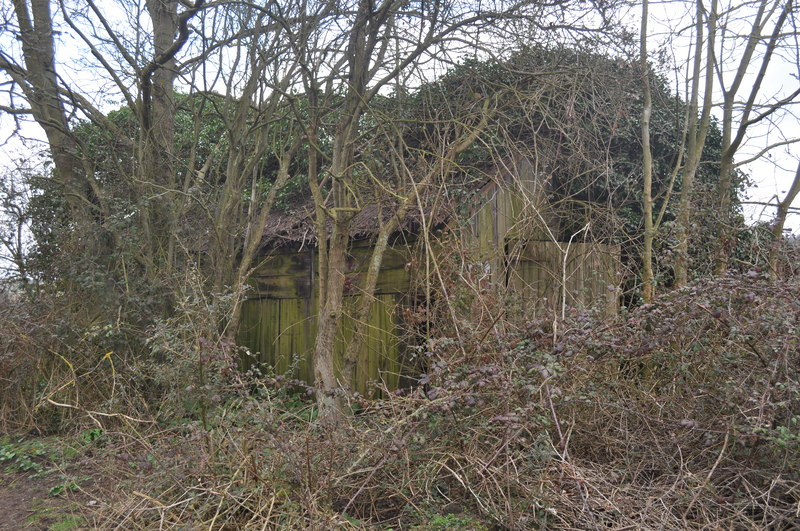
Old coal goods shed

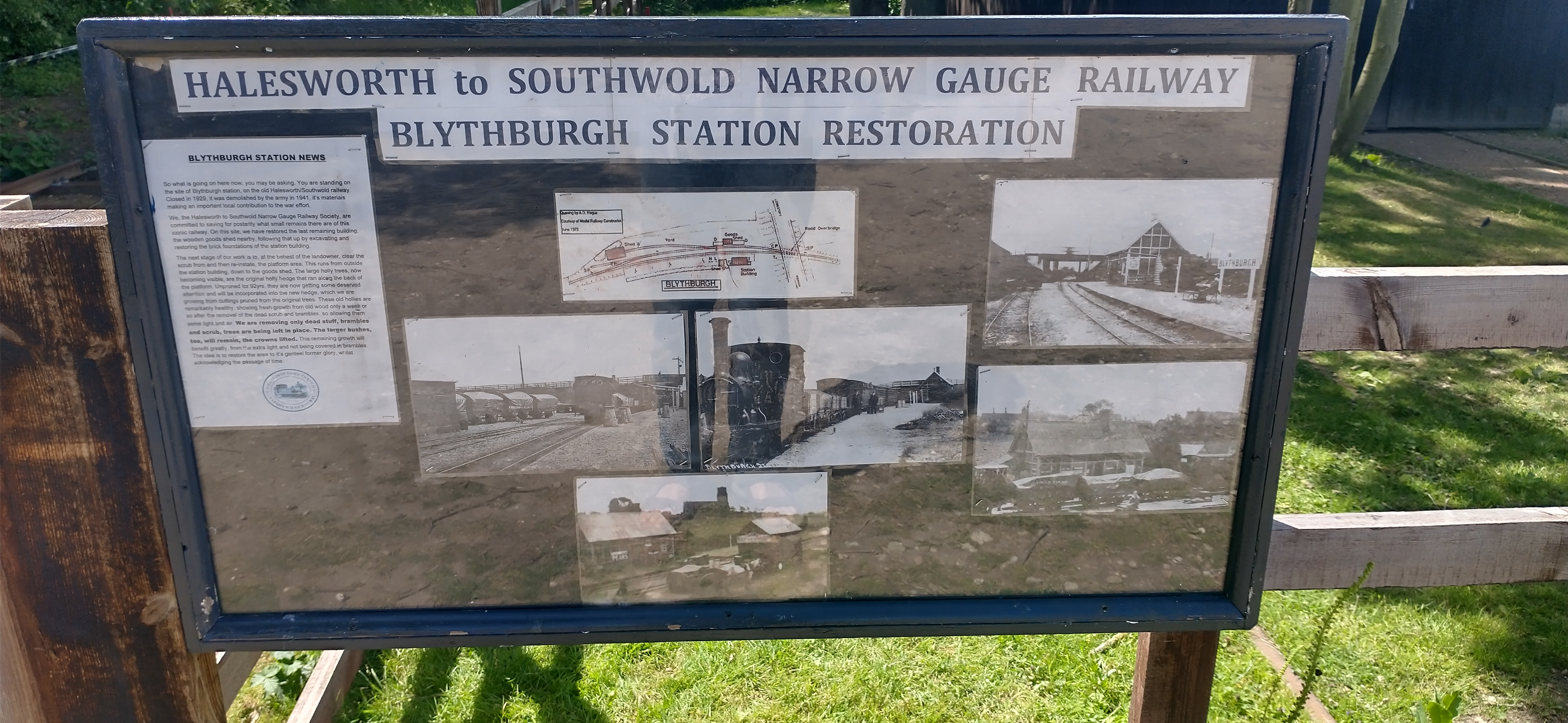
Information board at Blythburgh Station Restoration site June 2022.

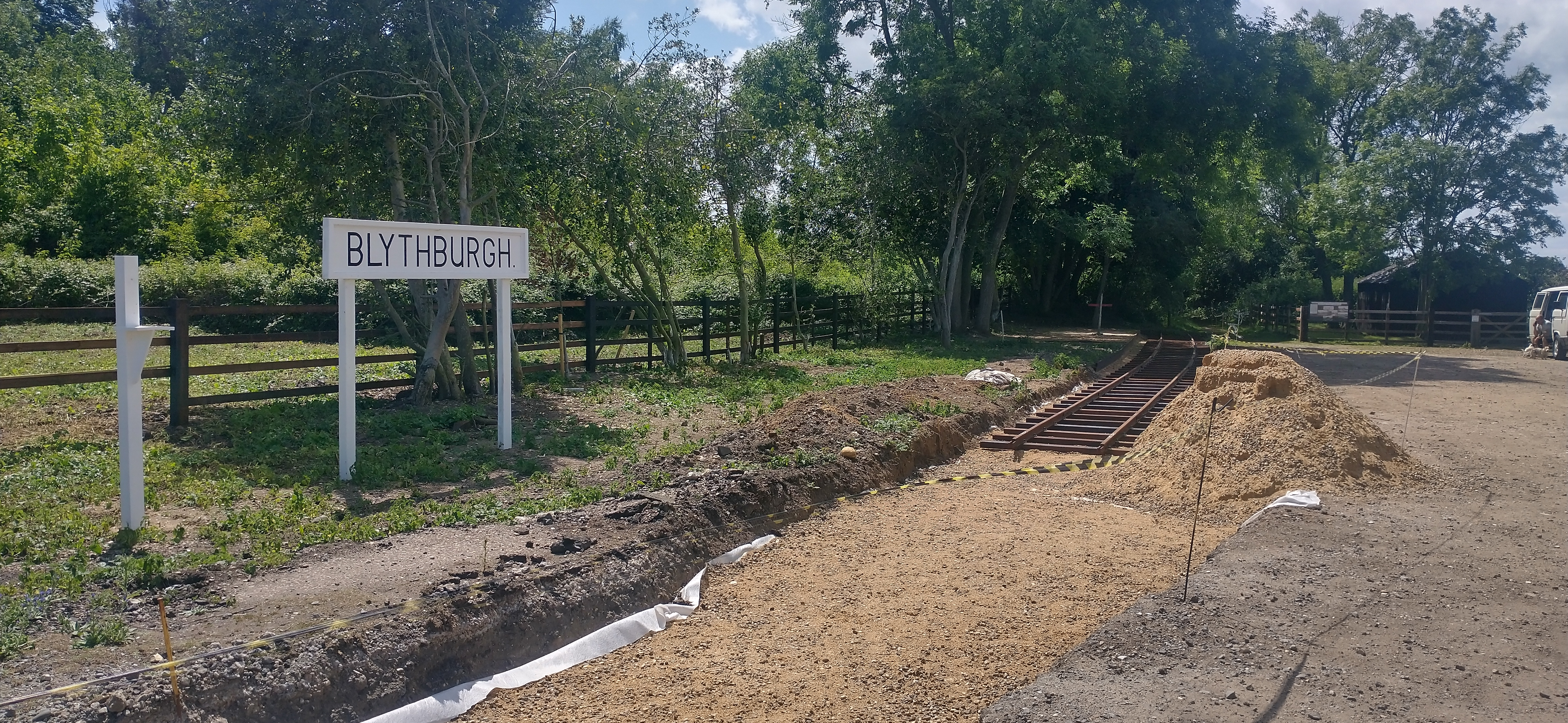
Blythburgh Station reconstruction work June 2022. Renovated coal goods shed right background.

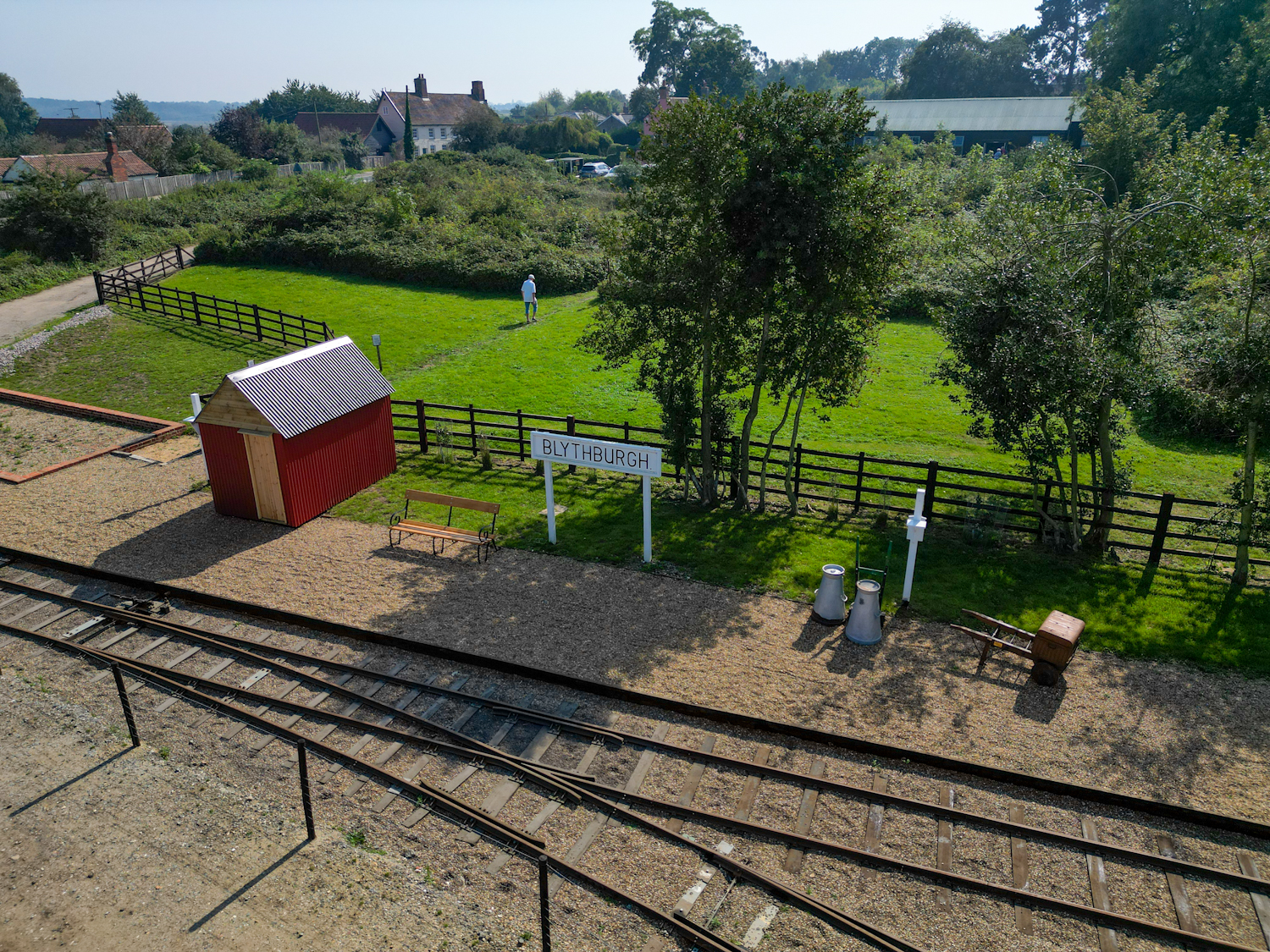
Recreated Blythburgh Station on the exact site of the original

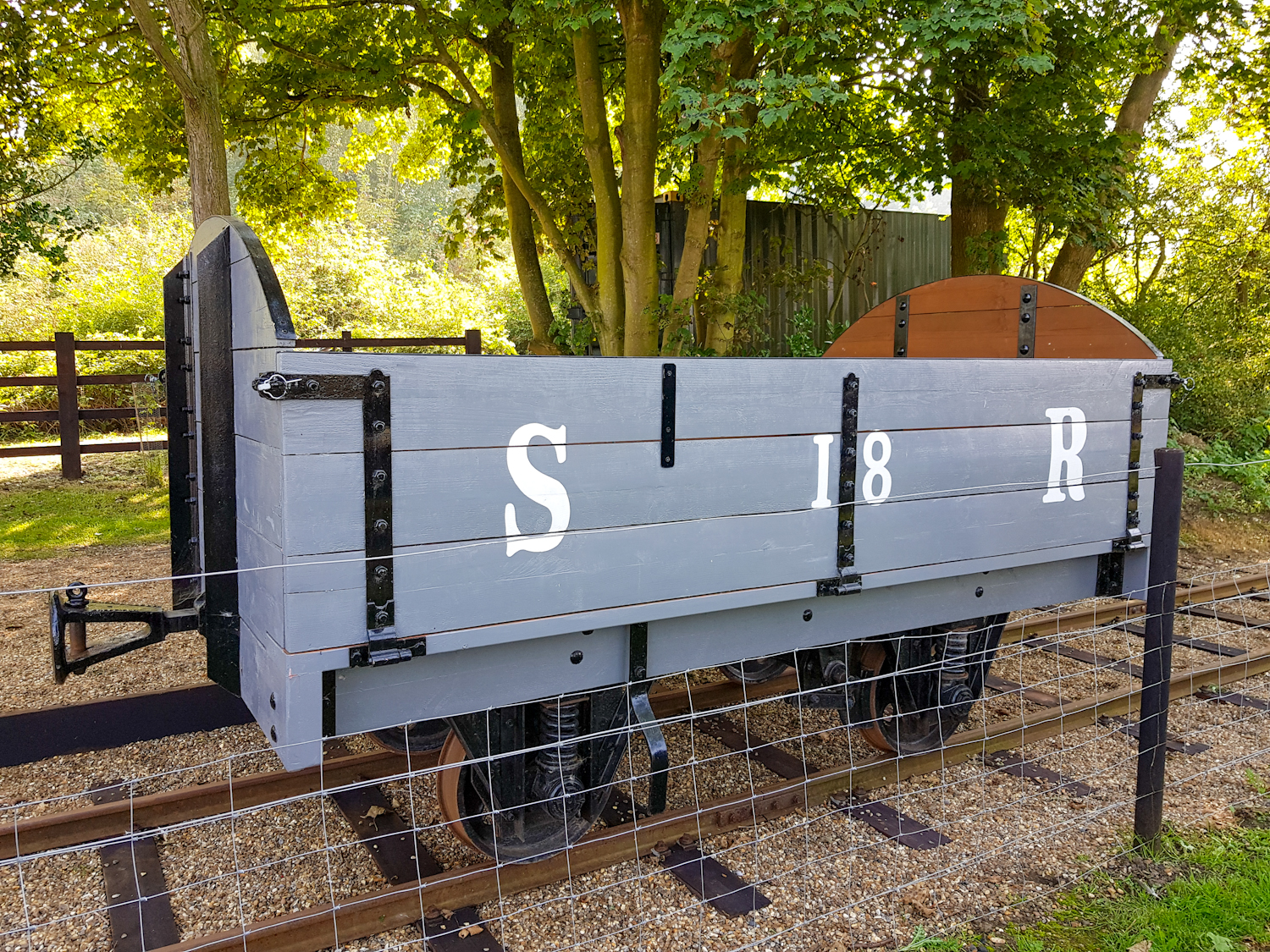
Recreated rolling stock by the H&SNGS

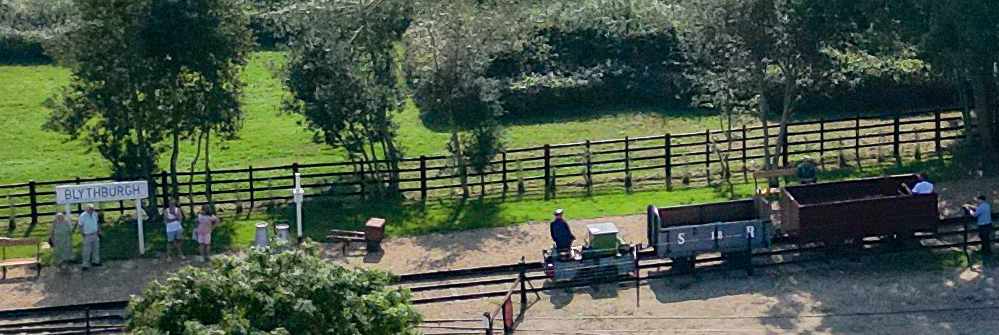
Demonstration train within confines of the recreated Blythburgh Station
