= Listed buildings in Halesworth =

Civil Parish in Suffolk, England

Halesworth is a town and civil parish in the East Suffolk District of Suffolk, England. It contains 119 listed buildings that are recorded in the National Heritage List for England. Of these four are grade II* and 115 are grade II.

This list is based on the information retrieved online from Historic England.

== Key ==
Grade	Criteria
I	Buildings that are of exceptional interest
II*	Particularly important buildings of more than special interest
II	Buildings that are of special interest

== Listing ==
Name	Grade	Location	Type	Completed (Note: The date given is the date used by Historic England as significant for the initial building or that of an important part in the structure's description.)	Date designated	Grid ref. (Note: The grid reference is based on the British national grid reference system, sometimes known as OSGB36, used by the Ordnance Survey.) Geo-coordinates	Notes	Entry number (Note: The "List Entry Number" is a unique number assigned to each listed building and scheduled monument by Historic England.)	Image	Wikidata
Cookley White House	II				18 July 1972	TM3770175959; 52°19′49″N 1°29′14″E		1267725	Upload Photo	Q26558102
Front Wall of Number 46 (the Elms)	II				18 July 1972	TM3854577134; 52°20′25″N 1°30′01″E		1267727	Upload Photo	Q26558103
Halesworth Station Moving Platforms	II	IP19 8JS	railway platform		4 February 2019	TM3886877908; 52°20′50″N 1°30′21″E		1454344	Halesworth Station Moving Platforms More images	Q61670278
1-3, Bridge Street	II	1-3, Bridge Street			18 July 1972	TM3865977672; 52°20′43″N 1°30′09″E		1031846	Upload Photo	Q26283236
5, Bridge Street	II	5, Bridge Street			19 July 1972	TM3864877660; 52°20′42″N 1°30′08″E		1352693	Upload Photo	Q26635676
16, Bridge Street	II	16, Bridge Street			18 July 1972	TM3861977629; 52°20′41″N 1°30′07″E		1031847	Upload Photo	Q26283237
19, Bridge Street	II	19, Bridge Street			18 July 1972	TM3863477669; 52°20′42″N 1°30′08″E		1352694	Upload Photo	Q26635677
Wisset Place	II	Bungay Road			18 July 1972	TM3904978350; 52°21′04″N 1°30′31″E		1352695	Upload Photo	Q26635678
1 and 2, Chediston Street	II	1 and 2, Chediston Street			18 July 1972	TM3853177439; 52°20′35″N 1°30′02″E		1031849	Upload Photo	Q26283239
15 and 15a, Chediston Street	II	15 and 15a, Chediston Street			18 July 1972	TM3844177446; 52°20′36″N 1°29′57″E		1031850	Upload Photo	Q26283240
36, Chediston Street	II	36, Chediston Street			18 July 1972	TM3839277430; 52°20′35″N 1°29′54″E		1352696	Upload Photo	Q26635679
40-42, Chediston Street	II	40-42, Chediston Street			18 July 1972	TM3837077441; 52°20′36″N 1°29′53″E		1031851	Upload Photo	Q26283241
50 and 51, Chediston Street	II	50 and 51, Chediston Street			18 July 1972	TM3833577430; 52°20′35″N 1°29′51″E		1376639	Upload Photo	Q26657173
Townend Villa	II	69, Chediston Street			18 July 1972	TM3829377426; 52°20′35″N 1°29′49″E		1031852	Upload Photo	Q26283242
80, Chediston Street	II	80, Chediston Street			18 July 1972	TM3833277445; 52°20′36″N 1°29′51″E		1376640	Upload Photo	Q26657174
83 and 84, Chediston Street	II	83 and 84, Chediston Street			18 July 1972	TM3836377457; 52°20′36″N 1°29′53″E		1031853	Upload Photo	Q26283244
95, Chediston Street	II	95, Chediston Street			18 July 1972	TM3841277462; 52°20′36″N 1°29′55″E		1031854	Upload Photo	Q26283245
124, Chediston Street	II	124, Chediston Street			21 October 1949	TM3847077460; 52°20′36″N 1°29′58″E		1376641	Upload Photo	Q26657175
125-127, Chediston Street	II	125-127, Chediston Street			17 July 1970	TM3848277459; 52°20′36″N 1°29′59″E		1031855	Upload Photo	Q26283246
130, Chediston Street	II	130, Chediston Street			18 July 1972	TM3849977458; 52°20′36″N 1°30′00″E		1267720	Upload Photo	Q26558097
134, Chediston Street	II	134, Chediston Street			18 July 1972	TM3851177458; 52°20′36″N 1°30′01″E		1239882	Upload Photo	Q26532828
145 and 146, Chediston Street	II	145 and 146, Chediston Street			18 July 1972	TM3853177453; 52°20′36″N 1°30′02″E		1267722	Upload Photo	Q26558099
147 and 148, Chediston Street	II	147 and 148, Chediston Street			18 July 1972	TM3854177450; 52°20′36″N 1°30′02″E		1239854	Upload Photo	Q26532801
151, Chediston Street	II	151, Chediston Street			18 July 1972	TM3855177445; 52°20′35″N 1°30′03″E		1239855	Upload Photo	Q26532802
154, Chediston Street	II	154, Chediston Street			18 July 1972	TM3857477431; 52°20′35″N 1°30′04″E		1222725	Upload Photo	Q26517034
20, Church Farm Lane	II	20, Church Farm Lane, IP19 8SY			18 July 1972	TM3845477351; 52°20′32″N 1°29′57″E		1224165	Upload Photo	Q26518368
Church Farmhouse	II	31, Church Farm Lane, IP19 8SY			18 July 1972	TM3843377338; 52°20′32″N 1°29′56″E		1223893	Upload Photo	Q26518129
1 Church Farm Lane	II	1, Church Lane Farm, IP19 8SY			18 July 1972	TM3855977346; 52°20′32″N 1°30′03″E		1223891	Upload Photo	Q26518127
Heveningham Hall Gate Lodges	II*	Halesworth Road	architectural structure		7 December 1966	TM3623371700; 52°17′33″N 1°27′46″E		1030800	Heveningham Hall Gate Lodges More images	Q17546091
White Horse	II	Halesworth Road	inn		21 December 1984	TM3577570198; 52°16′46″N 1°27′18″E		1377162	White Horse More images	Q26657645
Wood Farmhouse	II	Halesworth Road			21 December 1984	TM3645870377; 52°16′50″N 1°27′54″E		1198057	Upload Photo	Q26492504
Hill Farmhouse	II	Holton Road			18 July 1972	TM3934977574; 52°20′38″N 1°30′45″E		1222750	Upload Photo	Q26517054
1-6 Holton Terrace	II	1-6 Holton Terrace, Holton Road			18 July 1972	TM3908177595; 52°20′39″N 1°30′31″E		1267723	Upload Photo	Q26558100
Castle House Including Part Occupied As Separate Cottage and Harvey's Academy	II	53, Holton Road			21 October 1949	TM3924777441; 52°20′34″N 1°30′39″E		1267724	Upload Photo	Q26558101
Town Farmhouse	II	Loampit Lane			18 July 1972	TM3933077958; 52°20′51″N 1°30′45″E		1222892	Upload Photo	Q26517189
Rifle Hall	II	London Road	house		11 May 2011	TM3851877111; 52°20′25″N 1°30′00″E		1400605	Rifle Hall More images	Q26675433
South Lodge	II	London Road			18 July 1972	TM3874276774; 52°20′13″N 1°30′11″E		1239863	Upload Photo	Q26532809
Gothic House	II*	2, London Road	house		21 October 1949	TM3866577335; 52°20′32″N 1°30′08″E		1239856	Gothic House More images	Q17546911
White Swan	II	4, London Road	pub		18 July 1972	TM3863177293; 52°20′30″N 1°30′06″E		1223029	White Swan More images	Q26517316
5, London Road	II	5, London Road			18 July 1972	TM3862277281; 52°20′30″N 1°30′06″E		1239857	Upload Photo	Q26532803
6, London Road	II	6, London Road			18 July 1972	TM3861877274; 52°20′30″N 1°30′06″E		1267497	Upload Photo	Q26557889
7 and 8, London Road	II	7 and 8, London Road			18 July 1972	TM3861577267; 52°20′30″N 1°30′06″E		1239858	Upload Photo	Q26532804
9, London Road	II	9, London Road			18 July 1972	TM3860977260; 52°20′29″N 1°30′05″E		1267470	Upload Photo	Q26557863
10, London Road	II	10, London Road			18 July 1972	TM3860477251; 52°20′29″N 1°30′05″E		1239860	Upload Photo	Q26532806
25-28, London Road	II	25-28, London Road			18 July 1972	TM3858377199; 52°20′27″N 1°30′04″E		1239861	Upload Photo	Q26532807
30, London Road	II	30, London Road			21 October 1949	TM3843576842; 52°20′16″N 1°29′55″E		1239864	Upload Photo	Q26532810
The Elms	II	46, London Road			18 July 1972	TM3852777135; 52°20′25″N 1°30′01″E		1239865	Upload Photo	Q26532811
51, London Road	II	51, London Road			18 July 1972	TM3855277173; 52°20′27″N 1°30′02″E		1239866	Upload Photo	Q26532813
52, London Road	II	52, London Road			18 July 1972	TM3855577178; 52°20′27″N 1°30′02″E		1267728	Upload Photo	Q26558104
53, London Road	II	53, London Road			18 July 1972	TM3855877184; 52°20′27″N 1°30′02″E		1239867	Upload Photo	Q26532814
54-58, London Road	II	54-58, London Road			18 July 1972	TM3857077214; 52°20′28″N 1°30′03″E		1267729	Upload Photo	Q26558105
59, London Road	II	59, London Road			18 July 1972	TM3853977235; 52°20′29″N 1°30′01″E		1239868	Upload Photo	Q26532815
60 and 61, London Road	II	60 and 61, London Road			18 July 1972	TM3854677237; 52°20′29″N 1°30′02″E		1223237	Upload Photo	Q26517511
63 and 63a, London Road	II	63 and 63a, London Road			18 July 1972	TM3856477237; 52°20′29″N 1°30′03″E		1239869	Upload Photo	Q26532816
90 and 91, London Road	II	90 and 91, London Road			18 July 1972	TM3857777286; 52°20′30″N 1°30′04″E		1267309	Upload Photo	Q26557717
92-94, London Road	II	92-94, London Road			18 July 1972	TM3860077281; 52°20′30″N 1°30′05″E		1267730	Upload Photo	Q26558106
95-97, London Road	II	95-97, London Road			18 July 1972	TM3860677298; 52°20′31″N 1°30′05″E		1223420	Upload Photo	Q26517689
Market Place Wine Shop with Masonic Hall Above	II	Market Place			18 July 1972	TM3857877416; 52°20′34″N 1°30′04″E		1267238	Upload Photo	Q26557651
Pump in Front of Numbers 4 and 5	II	Market Place	pump		18 July 1972	TM3859577406; 52°20′34″N 1°30′05″E		1223423	Pump in Front of Numbers 4 and 5 More images	Q26517692
The Social Club	II*	Market Place	clubhouse		21 October 1949	TM3853777404; 52°20′34″N 1°30′02″E		1223564	The Social Club More images	Q17546900
1, Market Place	II	1, Market Place			18 July 1972	TM3862377407; 52°20′34″N 1°30′06″E		1223428	Upload Photo	Q26517697
2, Market Place	II	2, Market Place			18 July 1972	TM3861377407; 52°20′34″N 1°30′06″E		1223546	Upload Photo	Q26517809
3, Market Place	II	3, Market Place			18 July 1972	TM3860677404; 52°20′34″N 1°30′05″E		1223429	Upload Photo	Q26517698
4 and 5, Market Place	II	4 and 5, Market Place			18 July 1972	TM3859277394; 52°20′34″N 1°30′05″E		1267262	Upload Photo	Q26557670
6, Market Place	II	6, Market Place			18 July 1972	TM3858577389; 52°20′34″N 1°30′04″E		1223430	Upload Photo	Q26517699
8 and 9, Market Place	II	8 and 9, Market Place			18 July 1972	TM3857177378; 52°20′33″N 1°30′03″E		1267224	Upload Photo	Q26557638
St Keyne	II	10, Market Place			21 October 1949	TM3856277392; 52°20′34″N 1°30′03″E		1223431	Upload Photo	Q26517700
19, Market Place	II	19, Market Place			18 July 1972	TM3855277425; 52°20′35″N 1°30′03″E		1267322	Upload Photo	Q26557728
25 and 26, Market Place	II	25 and 26, Market Place			21 November 1969	TM3859077428; 52°20′35″N 1°30′05″E		1223433	Upload Photo	Q26517701
27, Market Place	II	27, Market Place			21 October 1949	TM3860977424; 52°20′35″N 1°30′06″E		1267206	Upload Photo	Q26557622
28 and 29, Market Place	II	28 and 29, Market Place			18 July 1972	TM3862077426; 52°20′35″N 1°30′06″E		1267284	Upload Photo	Q26557692
Archers Cottage	II	Norwich Road			18 July 1972	TM3921678824; 52°21′19″N 1°30′41″E		1031848	Upload Photo	Q26283238
Congreagational Church	II	Quay Street	church building		18 July 1972	TM3871077729; 52°20′44″N 1°30′12″E		1267197	Congreagational Church More images	Q26557614
Front Wing Walls and Railings of Number 1	II	Quay Street			18 July 1972	TM3896077661; 52°20′42″N 1°30′25″E		1223436	Upload Photo	Q26517704
1, Quay Street	II	1, Quay Street			18 July 1972	TM3895077658; 52°20′42″N 1°30′24″E		1267252	Upload Photo	Q26557662
Outbuilding to Number 1	II	1, Quay Street			18 July 1972	TM3896777649; 52°20′41″N 1°30′25″E		1267220	Upload Photo	Q26557634
Quay House	II	6, Quay Street			21 October 1949	TM3882577710; 52°20′43″N 1°30′18″E		1223637	Upload Photo	Q26517891
7 and 8, Quay Street	II	7 and 8, Quay Street			18 July 1972	TM3878777714; 52°20′44″N 1°30′16″E		1223437	Upload Photo	Q26517705
15, Quay Street	II	15, Quay Street	house		21 October 1949	TM3870177686; 52°20′43″N 1°30′11″E		1223438	15, Quay Street More images	Q26517707
22-25, Quay Street	II	22-25, Quay Street			18 July 1972	TM3873377721; 52°20′44″N 1°30′13″E		1223439	Upload Photo	Q26517708
47 and 48, Quay Street	II	47 and 48, Quay Street			21 October 1949	TM3886477717; 52°20′44″N 1°30′20″E		1223792	Upload Photo	Q26518039
49 and 50, Quay Street	II	49 and 50, Quay Street			18 July 1972	TM3888677707; 52°20′43″N 1°30′21″E		1223440	Upload Photo	Q26517709
51-54, Quay Street	II	51-54, Quay Street			18 July 1972	TM3890877697; 52°20′43″N 1°30′22″E		1223441	Upload Photo	Q26517710
Boundary Wall on East Side of Rectory Lane	II	Rectory Lane			18 July 1972	TM3851877522; 52°20′38″N 1°30′01″E		1267116	Upload Photo	Q26557541
The Old Rectory	II	Rectory Street			21 October 1949	TM3852477615; 52°20′41″N 1°30′02″E		1267067	Upload Photo	Q26557502
Wall of Garden of the Old Rectory	II	Rectory Street			18 July 1972	TM3854777624; 52°20′41″N 1°30′03″E		1223889	Upload Photo	Q26518125
4-6, Rectory Street	II	4-6, Rectory Street			18 July 1972	TM3859777647; 52°20′42″N 1°30′06″E		1267290	Upload Photo	Q26557698
9, Rectory Street	II	9, Rectory Street			18 July 1972	TM3856377656; 52°20′42″N 1°30′04″E		1223859	Upload Photo	Q26518100
15 and 16, Rectory Street	II	15 and 16, Rectory Street			18 July 1972	TM3856777751; 52°20′45″N 1°30′04″E		1223545	Upload Photo	Q26517808
17 and 18, Rectory Street	II	17 and 18, Rectory Street			18 July 1972	TM3856577738; 52°20′45″N 1°30′04″E		1223885	Upload Photo	Q26518121
Belrail House	II	23, Rectory Street			18 July 1972	TM3855977675; 52°20′43″N 1°30′04″E		1267066	Upload Photo	Q26557501
24-27, Rectory Street	II	24-27, Rectory Street			18 July 1972	TM3857477668; 52°20′43″N 1°30′04″E		1223887	Upload Photo	Q26518123
30, Rectory Street	II	30, Rectory Street			18 July 1972	TM3860777656; 52°20′42″N 1°30′06″E		1223888	Upload Photo	Q26518124
Wall of Garden of Number 24	II	Station Road			18 July 1972	TM3881077814; 52°20′47″N 1°30′17″E		1223890	Upload Photo	Q26518126
24, Station Road	II	24, Station Road			18 July 1972	TM3880077833; 52°20′48″N 1°30′17″E		1267068	Upload Photo	Q26557503
Church of St Mary the Virgin	II*	Steeple End	church building		21 October 1949	TM3860277364; 52°20′33″N 1°30′05″E		1267069	Church of St Mary the Virgin More images	Q17546917
The Old Almshouses	II*	Steeple End, IP19 8LL			21 October 1949	TM3859677315; 52°20′31″N 1°30′05″E		1224060	Upload Photo	Q17546905
14, 15 and 16 Steeple End	II	14, 15 and 16, Steeple End, IP19 8LL			18 July 1972	TM3856977356; 52°20′32″N 1°30′03″E		1224112	Upload Photo	Q26518322
17 Steeple End	II	17, Steeple End, IP19 8LL			18 July 1972	TM3857577371; 52°20′33″N 1°30′04″E		1267070	Upload Photo	Q26557504
Halesworth War Memorial Obelisk	II	The Arboretum, Thoroughfare, IP19 8LQ	war memorial		12 September 2018	TM3863477393; 52°20′34″N 1°30′07″E		1458816	Halesworth War Memorial Obelisk More images	Q66479882
The Angel Hotel	II	Thoroughfare, IP19 8AH	hotel		21 October 1949	TM3868777449; 52°20′35″N 1°30′10″E		1267074	The Angel Hotel More images	Q26557508
White Lion	II	Thoroughfare	pub		18 July 1972	TM3867677361; 52°20′32″N 1°30′09″E		1224536	White Lion More images	Q26518711
1, Thoroughfare	II	1, Thoroughfare			21 October 1949	TM3863477591; 52°20′40″N 1°30′07″E		1267071	Upload Photo	Q26557505
2, Thoroughfare	II	2, Thoroughfare			18 July 1972	TM3863477583; 52°20′40″N 1°30′07″E		1266926	Upload Photo	Q26557377
3, Thoroughfare	II	3, Thoroughfare			18 July 1972	TM3863377579; 52°20′40″N 1°30′07″E		1223894	Upload Photo	Q26518130
4, Thoroughfare	II	4, Thoroughfare			18 July 1972	TM3863577575; 52°20′39″N 1°30′07″E		1224256	Upload Photo	Q26518453
5 and 6, Thoroughfare	II	5 and 6, Thoroughfare			21 October 1949	TM3863377563; 52°20′39″N 1°30′07″E		1223895	Upload Photo	Q26518131
8, Thoroughfare	II	8, Thoroughfare			21 October 1949	TM3863877551; 52°20′39″N 1°30′07″E		1223896	Upload Photo	Q26518132
9, Thoroughfare	II	9, Thoroughfare			18 July 1972	TM3864177545; 52°20′38″N 1°30′08″E		1224312	Upload Photo	Q26518505
White Hart Hotel	II	10, Thoroughfare	hotel		18 July 1972	TM3864677536; 52°20′38″N 1°30′08″E		1267073	White Hart Hotel More images	Q26557507
12 and 13, Thoroughfare	II	12 and 13, Thoroughfare			18 July 1972	TM3865777522; 52°20′38″N 1°30′08″E		1266851	Upload Photo	Q26557309
14 and 14a, Thoroughfare	II	14 and 14a, Thoroughfare			18 July 1972	TM3866377510; 52°20′37″N 1°30′09″E		1223897	Upload Photo	Q26518133
15 and 16, Thoroughfare	II	15 and 16, Thoroughfare			21 October 1949	TM3867477498; 52°20′37″N 1°30′09″E		1224419	Upload Photo	Q26518602
34 and 35, Thoroughfare	II	34, Thoroughfare, IP19 8AP			21 October 1949	TM3866677419; 52°20′34″N 1°30′09″E		1224497	Upload Photo	Q26518676
36, Thoroughfare	II	36, Thoroughfare, IP19 8LF	building		18 July 1972	TM3865777408; 52°20′34″N 1°30′08″E		1223899	36, Thoroughfare More images	Q26518135
Walls of Garden of 36, Thoroughfare	II	36, Thoroughfare, IP19 8LF			18 July 1972	TM3869177403; 52°20′34″N 1°30′10″E		1223898	Upload Photo	Q26518134
38, Thoroughfare	II	38, Thoroughfare			18 July 1972	TM3866877369; 52°20′33″N 1°30′09″E		1224535	Upload Photo	Q26518710
King's Arms	II	42, Thoroughfare			21 October 1949	TM3863877431; 52°20′35″N 1°30′07″E		1224537	Upload Photo	Q26518712
46, Thoroughfare	II	46, Thoroughfare			18 July 1972	TM3867577462; 52°20′36″N 1°30′09″E		1224538	Upload Photo	Q26518713
49 and 49a, Thoroughfare (see Details for Further Address Information)	II	49 and 49a, Thoroughfare			18 July 1972	TM3866077492; 52°20′37″N 1°30′08″E		1224539	Upload Photo	Q26518714
56-58, Thoroughfare	II	56-58, Thoroughfare			18 July 1972	TM3862577532; 52°20′38″N 1°30′07″E		1224540	Upload Photo	Q26518715
59, Thoroughfare	II	59, Thoroughfare			18 July 1972	TM3862077547; 52°20′39″N 1°30′07″E		1224541	Upload Photo	Q26518716

== See also ==
- Grade I listed buildings in Suffolk
- Grade II* listed buildings in Suffolk

== Sources ==
- Bettely, James; Pevsner, Nikolaus (2015) [1961], Suffolk: East, The Buildings of England, New Haven and London: Yale University Press, ISBN 978-0-300-19654-2
