= Wenhaston with Mells Hamlet =

Civil parish in Suffolk, England

Coordinates: 52°19′45″N 01°32′32″E

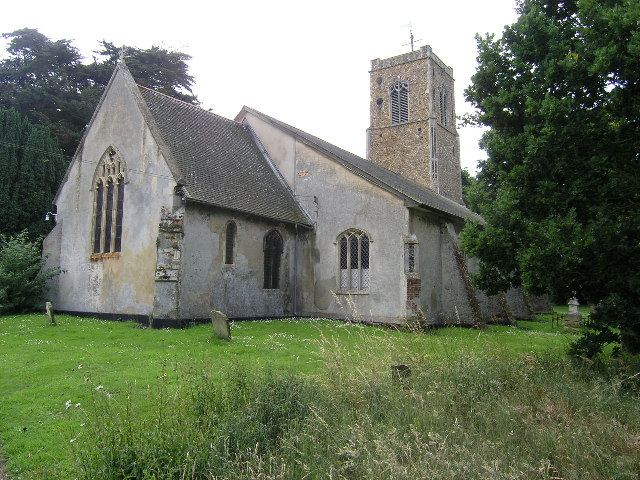
- Church of St Peter, Wenhaston

- Location within Suffolk
- Population: 801 (2011 census)
- Civil parish: Wenhaston with Mells Hamlet
- District: East Suffolk
- Shire county: Suffolk
- Region: East
- Country: England
- Sovereign state: United Kingdom

Wenhaston with Mells Hamlet is a civil parish in the East Suffolk district, in the county of Suffolk, England. The population at the 2011 Census was 801. It is situated just south of the River Blyth.
