= Mells, Suffolk =

Hamlet in Suffolk, England

Coordinates: 52.337°N 1.529°E

Mells
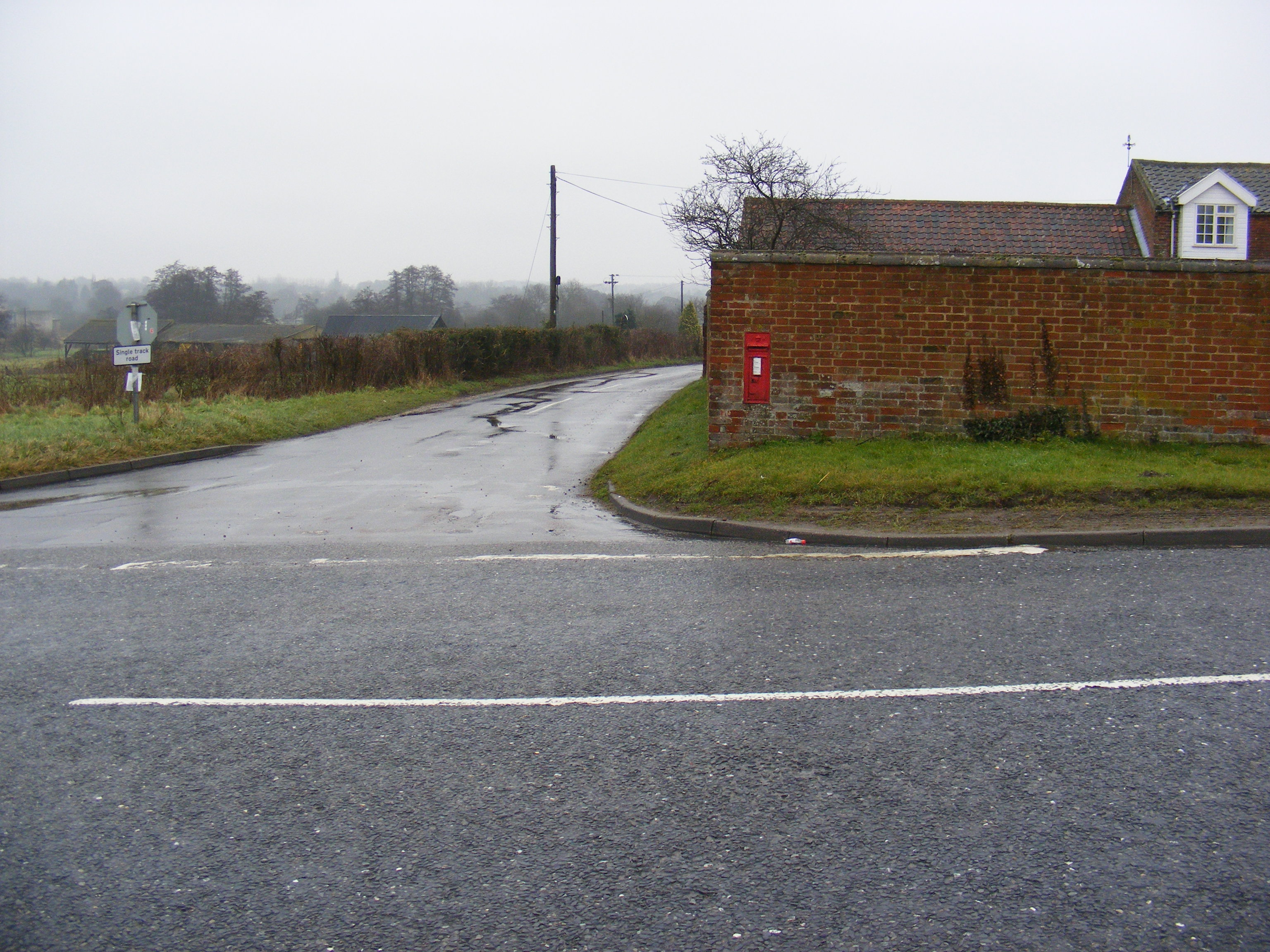

- Location within Suffolk
- OS grid reference: TM405768
- Shire county: Suffolk
- Region: East
- Country: England
- Sovereign state: United Kingdom

Mells is a hamlet in the English county of Suffolk.

It is on the southern bank of the River Blyth across the river by bridge from Holton; it forms part of Wenhaston with Mells Hamlet civil parish that, in turn, forms part of East Suffolk district.

The place-name 'Mells' is first attested in the Domesday Book of 1086, where it appears as Mealla. The name simply means 'mills', from the Old English 'mylen'.
