= The Cut (theatre) =

Theatre in Halesworth, England

Coordinates: 52.3461°N 1.5039°E

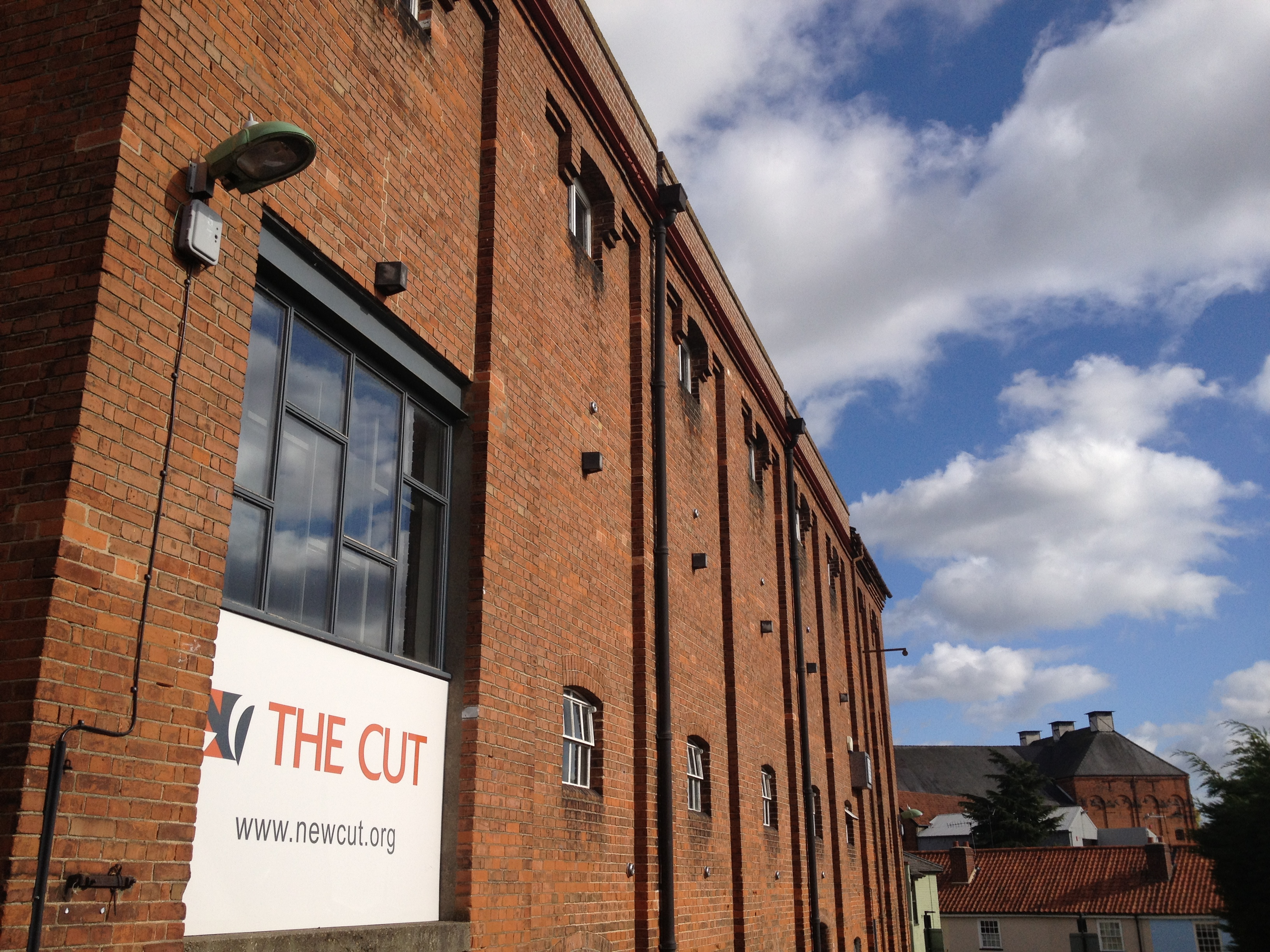
- Interactive map of The Cut
- Address: The Cut; Halesworth; England, UK
- Operator: New Cut Arts
- Capacity: 220
- Current use: Active

Construction
- Opened: 2003
- Years active: 2003-Present

Website
- www.newcut.org

The Cut Arts Centre is a theatre in the Suffolk town of Halesworth. It is a centre for arts in the community and offers music, theatre, dance, comedy, cinema, workshops and art exhibitions to the local area. It has a cafe and licensed bar and is a registered charity, relying on the support of the local community and its Lottery Club benefactors. The Cut also houses businesses with rented office space.

In its 20 year history The Cut has welcomed over 40,000 visitors.

It was home to the Halesworth Arts Festival every October which featured national and international artists of the highest calibre. 2011 was its tenth year and it attracts visitors from all over the South East. The venue used to host the annual HighTide Festival in May, until it eventually moved in 2014. It now houses the annual INK Festival, created by The Cut founder, James Holloway.
