= Wenhaston =

Village in Suffolk, England

Coordinates: 52.325°N 1.554°E

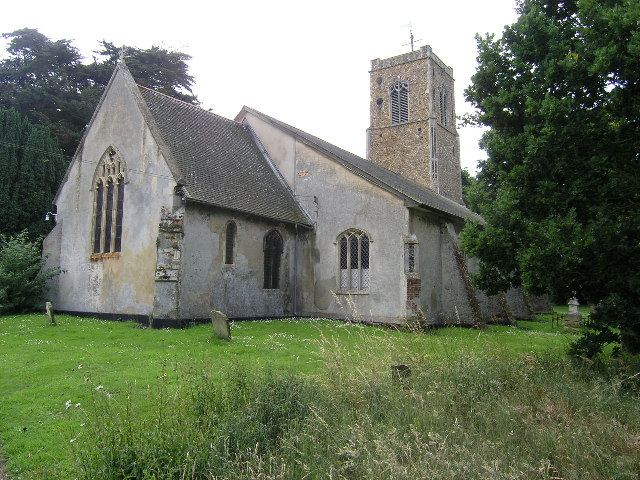
- Wenhaston, Church of St Peter

- Location within Suffolk
- Area: 0.427 km^{2} (0.165 sq mi)
- Population: 563 (2018 estimate)
  - Density: 1,319/km^{2} (3,420/sq mi)
- OS grid reference: TM423756
- Civil parish: Wenhaston with Mells Hamlet
- District: East Suffolk
- Shire county: Suffolk
- Region: East
- Country: England
- Sovereign state: United Kingdom
- Post town: Halesworth
- Postcode district: IP19

Wenhaston is a village in the civil parish of Wenhaston with Mells Hamlet, in the East Suffolk district, in northeastern Suffolk, England. It is situated to the south of the River Blyth. In 2018 it had an estimated population of 563.

== History ==
Roman coins, pottery and building materials unearthed in local fields indicate the existence of a settlement at Wenhaston from the first century AD, and indeed this was probably a market of some importance between 80 and 350 AD. The first written record of its existence is to be found in the Domesday Book of 1086, when it was noted that the village of Wenadestuna possessed a mill, a church and woodland sufficient to feed 16 hogs. The place-name Wenhaston means 'Wynhaeth's town'.

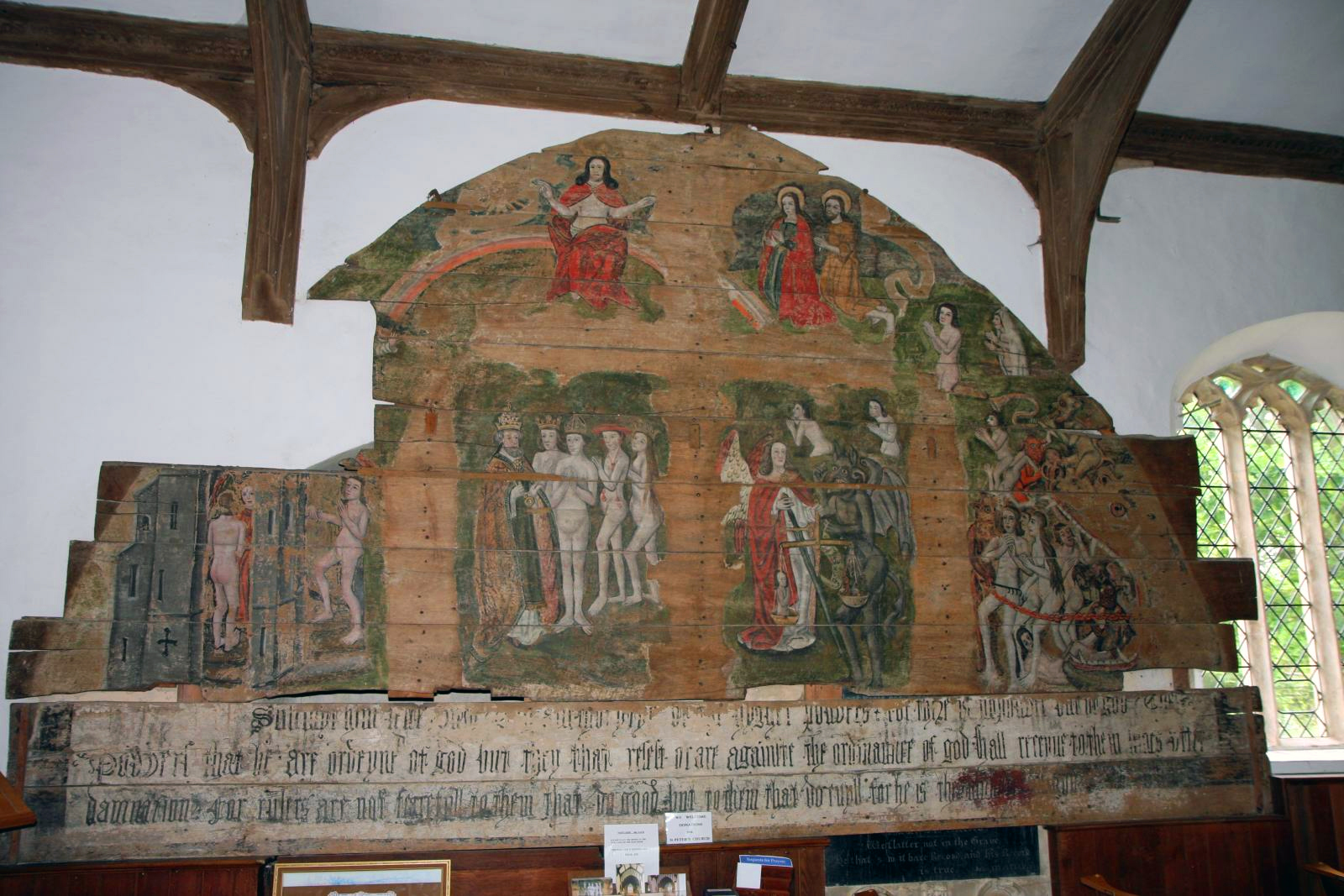
The Wenhaston Doom

Historical sites in the village include the Wenhaston Doom in St Peter's Church, a sixteenth-century (pre-Reformation) panel painting depicting the Last Judgement. This rare work of art was discovered during restoration work in 1892, hidden under whitewash on the wooden tympanum taken down from above the chancel arch.

Today, the local community and economy of Wenhaston continues to benefit from its proximity to the Suffolk Heritage Coast and the flourishing resort town of Southwold. Wenhaston won the Suffolk Coastal Village of the Year 2004 competition, and came second in the Suffolk County competition.

== Economy ==
There is a thriving pig farm industry in the fields between Wenhaston and Blythburgh.

== Geography ==
Wenhaston is closely adjoined by the village of Blackheath, which has for years been considered a part of Wenhaston, bringing the population up to 1000 or more.

Blythburgh village is around 2 miles from Wenhaston and around a 10- to 15-minute bicycle ride from Wenhaston.

== Transport ==
Wenhaston had a railway station on the Southwold Railway but this closed, with the rest of the line, on 11 April 1929.

Wenhaston has been connected to Halesworth and Southwold by bus services in the past years with routes being traced to eastern counties omnibus. Presently in 2022 the First Bus 99A serves Wenhaston all year around.
