= Southwold Railway =

Disused narrow gauge railway in Suffolk

Coordinates: 52.3215°N 1.6009°E

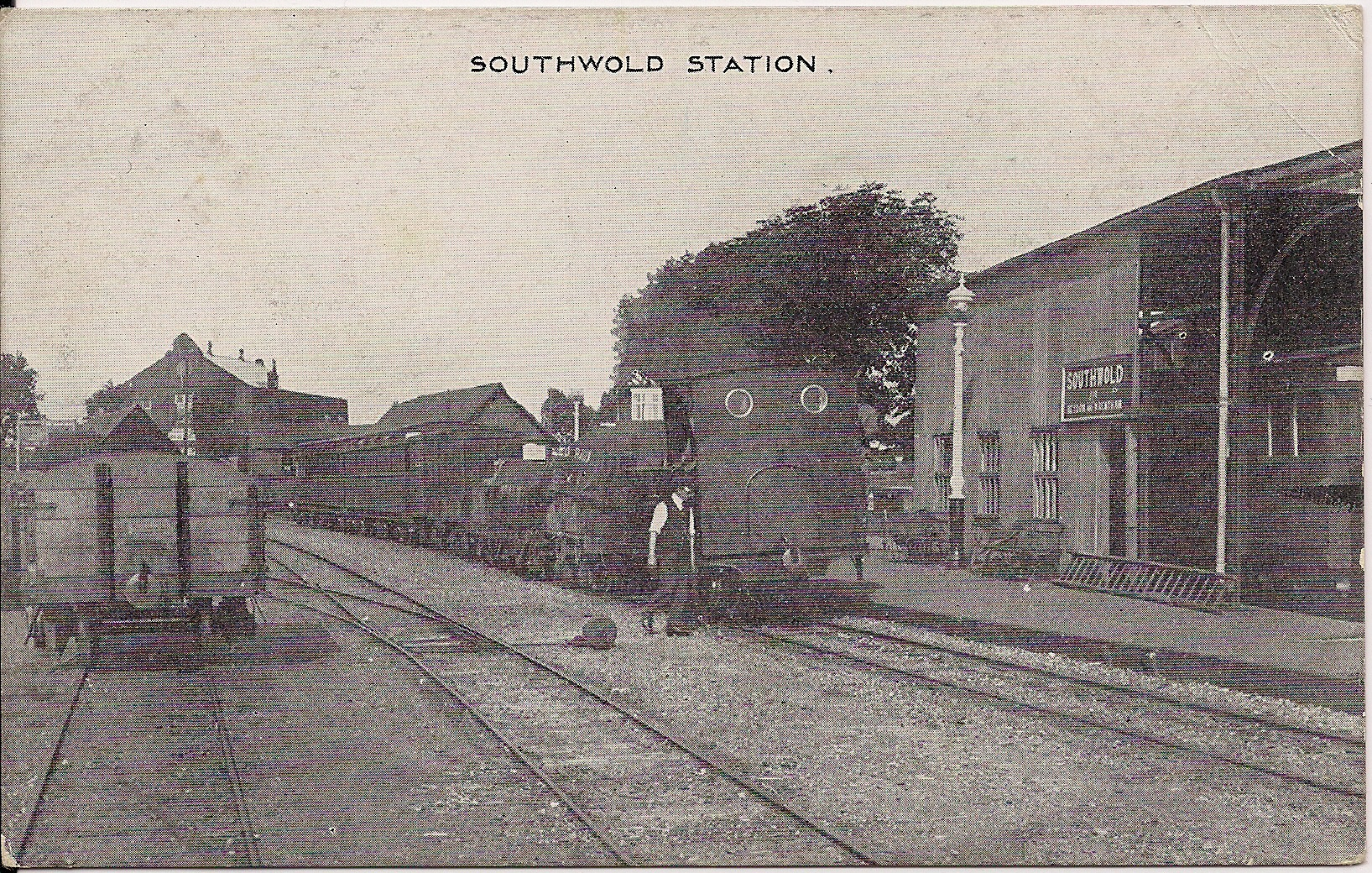
- A postcard sent in 1924 featuring Southwold railway station

Overview
- Headquarters: Southwold
- Locale: Suffolk
- Dates of operation: 1879–1929
- Successor: Closed down

Technical
- Track gauge: 3 ft (914 mm)
- Length: 8 miles 63 1/2 chains (14.15 km)

The Southwold Railway was a narrow gauge railway line between Halesworth and Southwold in the English county of Suffolk. 8 miles 63 1/2 chains (14.15 km) long, it was 3 ft (914 mm) narrow gauge. It opened in 1879 and closed in 1929.

Intermediate stations were at Wenhaston, Blythburgh and Walberswick.

== Route ==
The route closely followed the River Blyth, with Halesworth and Southwold both on the north side, but the longest section, including the intermediate stations, was on the south side. Although the line closed in 1929, its track was still marked and identified on a 1933 Ordnance Survey map. The line was lifted and the equipment was scrapped in 1941 to help with war efforts. Some track can still be found on the harbour branch and a surviving van is at the East Anglia Transport Museum. At the former Blythburgh station, the Coal Shed has now been restored and a short section of track has been laid next to a recreated platform along with two sidings. Replica rolling stock and a battery electric 3ft gauge locomotive 'Greenbat' are occasionally operated on open days.

Parts of the route from Southwold to Blythburgh are walkable, particularly through woodland known as the Heronry on the south shore of the Blyth estuary. The original bridge at Southwold was blown up during the war but its pillars now support a footbridge.

== History ==
Southwold has had a harbour since at least Saxon times, but its importance as a port began to decline during the 19th century. In an attempt to reverse the declining fortunes of the town, the corporation promoted it as a holiday resort, where bathing in private was available on the wide beaches. They expected the East Suffolk Railway from Ipswich to Great Yarmouth to pass through the town, but it was built further inland, due in part to the underlying geology of the area. Although there was a horse-drawn omnibus service which ran to Darsham station once a day, this was not ideal, and a request was made to the railway company for a branch line to Southwold from Halesworth in 1855. The East Suffolk Railway were not prepared to build one, and several similar schemes were proposed over the next 20 years. The Southwold and Halesworth Tramway obtained the Southwold and Halesworth Tramways Order 1872 within the Tramways Orders Confirmation (No. 3) Act 1872 (35 & 36 Vict. c. clvii), with the intention of building a steam tramway between the two towns, using the provisions of the Tramways Act 1870 (33 & 34 Vict. c. 78), but they failed to raise sufficient funds, and the project foundered. Still there were calls for a railway, and in October 1875 two public meetings were held. Mr Charles Easton of Easton Hall chaired one in Halesworth, and the Earl of Stradbroke, who lived at Henham Hall, chaired the other in Southwold. Both were local landowners, and they invited a civil engineer called Arthur C. Pain to speak, together with Richard C. Rapier, who was part of the engineering firm of Ransomes & Rapier. Both speakers suggested that a 2 ft 6 in (762 mm) gauge railway would be considerably cheaper to build than a standard gauge one, and the meetings resulted in the formation of the Southwold Railway Company. Colonel Heneage Bagot-Chester was appointed as chairman, the two speakers became engineers, and the secretary was a local solicitor called H R Allen.

Southwold Railway Act 1876
- Act of Parliament
- Parliament of the United Kingdom
- Long title: An Act for making a Railway from Halesworth to Southwold, with Branches therefrom, all in the County of Suffolk.
- Citation: 39 & 40 Vict. c. clxxxix

Dates
- Royal assent: 24 July 1876

Text of statute as originally enacted

The company obtained an act of Parliament, the Southwold Railway Act 1876 (39 & 40 Vict. c. clxxxix) on 24 July 1876, to allow the line to be constructed. The main line was 8 miles 63 1/2 chains (14.15 km) long, running from Southwold to Halesworth, and two branches were also authorised. A 0.48-mile (0.77 km) branch at Halesworth linked up with the Blyth Navigation, and there was a link to Blackshore Quay, between Southwold and Walberswick, which was to be 0.25 miles (0.40 km) long. The company could raise £40,000 in working capital by issuing £10 shares, and also had powers to borrow a further £13,000 by issuing debentures. The gauge of the railway had to be at least 2 ft 6 in (762 mm), and because the line was covered by the Regulation of Railways Act 1868, it could use a simple signalling system and light earthworks, providing loads were limited and speeds did not exceed 25 miles per hour (40 km/h). In practice, this meant that journey times between the two termini would be about 30 minutes, and trains were limited to 100 passengers.

Following a report by C J Wall, a former manager of the Bristol and Exeter Railway, the gauge of 3 ft (914 mm) was chosen. This would make the line somewhat more expensive to build, but it was thought that the increased carrying capacity would offset this. A prospectus was published on 3 November 1877, which mentioned that the company had agreed provisional contracts with Charles Chambers of Westminster, who would build the line and stations for £30,000, and with the Bristol Wagon & Carriage Works Co, who would supply the locomotives and rolling stock for £4,000. The company suffered upheaval around this time, as Allen, the secretary, resigned due to a conflict of interest, when he found himself representing local landowners in their negotiations with the railway. He was replaced by T. H. Jellicoe, who was joined on the board by the Mayor of Southwold and R. C. Rapier. Raising finance proved difficult, and when Chambers declined to enter into a proper contract until they were sure that purchase of the land was certain, most of the board resigned on 5 November 1877. Only Rapier and Bagot-Chester remained, to be joined by a new board, who were not local men, whereas all of the previous board except one had been residents of Halesworth. Board meetings moved to Rapier's London office, and he became chairman on 20 December 1877. Bagot-Chester resigned from the company on 29 January 1879, leaving a board that had no real commitment to the service of the community.

Rapier worked energetically on the project, and £5,000 borrowed from the English & Foreign Credit Co enabled purchase of the land to begin. Contracts were re-negotiated, and construction work began on 3 May 1878. Sleepers were bought from Norway, and arrived by ship at Southwold harbour. The rails came from the Tredegar Iron Co, and also arrived at the harbour. Ransomes & Rapier supplied the signalling and switchgear, and a local blacksmith called Charlie List was responsible for much of the ironwork. The completed works were inspected by the Board of Trade on 19 September 1879, and a celebration lunch was held at the Swan Hotel on 23 September. Torrential rain that night caused significant flooding in Suffolk, and the line near Wenhaston Mill was submerged, but the official opening took place on 24 September, and the first train completed a return journey despite the water. Subsequent trains ran between Southwold and Wenhaston, as the flooding worsened. The intermediate stations at Walberswick and Blythburgh were not completed until later.

=== Operation ===
The railway was supplied with three locomotives for the opening, built by Sharp, Stewart and Company. They had a 2-4-0 wheel arrangement, and the design was similar to others that the company had supplied for light passenger work. Sharp Stewart also supplied rolling stock, and accepted debentures in part payment, only receiving one-third of the total cost in cash. Construction of the railway had cost £90,000, (equivalent to £9,670,000 in 2025), and the company applied to the Board of Trade for authority to raise more capital in 1880. Income from the operation of the trains did not produce enough surplus to keep paying the debenture interest, and in 1883 Sharp Stewart cancelled their arrangement, repossessing locomotive No. 1. The other two locomotives and the rest of the stock were then hired at £150 per year. In 1888, the company was authorised to raise another £10,000 in debentures, which was used to pay the arrears in interest on the existing debentures, and in 1890 enabled them to purchase the stock outright.

In the first month of operation, the company applied to the Board of Trade for permission to run the line as a light railway and this was granted on 11 March 1880. A maximum speed of 16 miles per hour (26 km/h) was specified, and it was to be worked by one engine in steam. Operation of the swing bridge was achieved using an Annett's key, which was attached to the staff, which the working engine was required to carry. Passenger traffic for the first ten years was fairly static, at around 76,000 journeys per year, but goods traffic doubled to reach 9,000 long tons (10,080 short tons; 9,144 t). The next ten years saw a steady increase, with passenger journeys rising to 100,000 by 1900, while 9,000 long tons (10,080 short tons; 9,144 t) of minerals and 6,000 long tons (6,720 short tons; 6,096 t) of parcels were carried. In order to cope with the increase, another locomotive was ordered from Sharp Stewart in 1893. It was of a similar design to the originals, but slightly longer, and with a 2-4-2 wheel arrangement. It carried the name "Southwold" and the number 1, as its predecessor had done.

Neither of the two branches specified by the original act of Parliament were built, due to a lack of funds, and the powers were allowed to lapse. At Halesworth, the single platform had a shelter for the passengers, and was connected to the Great Eastern station by a footbridge. There was a raised timber platform between one of the sidings and a 4 ft 8 1/2 in (1,435 mm) standard gauge siding, where goods were transhipped. In 1908, a passing loop was added at Blythburgh, and train control was managed by having a staff for each section. Many of the trains were mixed goods and passenger workings, with the shunting at intermediate stations adding to the journey time for the passengers. The stock did not have a continuous brake, and although the Board of Trade raised the issue at regular intervals, the railway was always able to point to its clean record for transporting passengers, and somehow managed to avoid having to fit one.

In 1906 it was announced that the line would be widened from its present narrow gauge to allow carriages and wagons to come direct through from Halesworth. This was not carried out, and the proposal was resurrected again in 1920.

== Closure ==
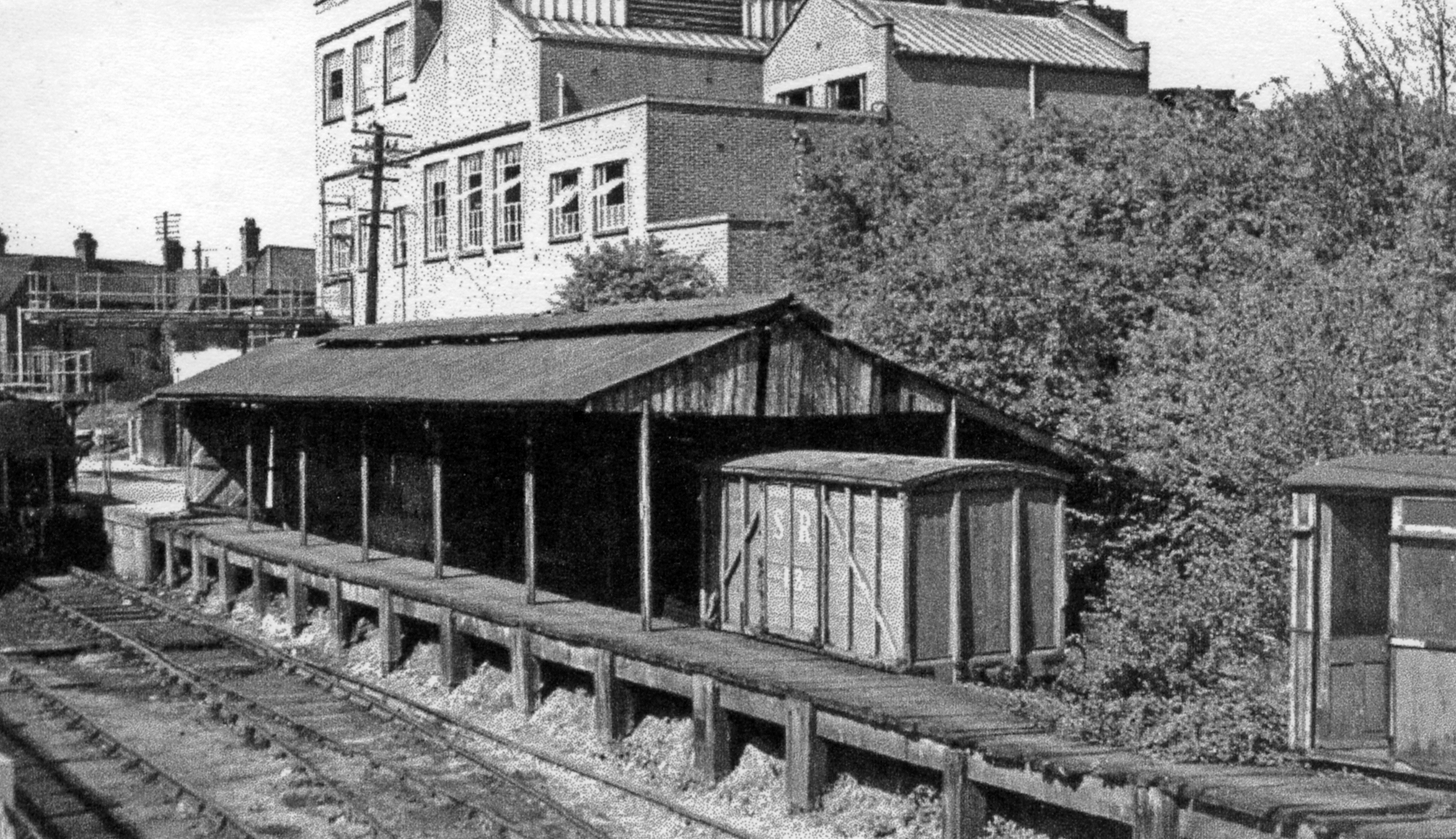
Disused terminal platforms of the former Southwold Railway at Halesworth, 1940

The railway closed on 11 April 1929 and the LNER instituted a bus service between Halesworth and Southwold as a replacement. In 1940 Southwold Council recommended to the Minister of Supply that the railway's assets should be confiscated for conversion into munitions. The town clerk was receiver for the Southwold Railway Company, but was unable to sell the property without consent of the High Court and an Act of Parliament.

== Proposed re-establishment of the line ==
The Southwold Railway Society was formed in 1994 to:

1. further the memory of the Southwold Railway and to foster wider interest therein
2. research, collate and add to the information about the Southwold Railway and to augment the existing collection of artifacts and memorabilia relating to the railway
3. Publish and otherwise disseminate information, display at exhibitions and promote public events
4. Investigate the possibility of re-establishing part of the line and to promote this if re-establishment was shown to be possible
5. Initiate and promote other such activities as are determined

The Southwold Railway Trust was established in 2006 with the objective of promoting awareness of the heritage of the Southwold Railway, preserving any remaining artefacts and instigating re-instatement of the railway as a local community and public amenity connecting Southwold to the main line railway at Halesworth.

To haul trains on the reopened line a replica Sharp Stewart steam locomotive, based on the designs of the locomotives that served the railway, has been built by North Bay Railway Engineering Services. The locomotive will be named Blyth and had been transported to the railway, undergone steam tests and first public runs by June 2026.

== Locomotives ==
| Number | Name | Builder | Type | Works Number | Built | Notes |
|---|---|---|---|---|---|---|
| (1) | Southwold | Sharp Stewart | 2-4-0T | 2848 | 1879 | Returned to makers 1883 |
| 1 | Southwold | Sharp Stewart | 2-4-2T | 3913 | 1893 | Scrapped 1929 |
| 2 | Halesworth | Sharp Stewart | 2-4-0T | 2849 | 1879 | Scrapped 1941 |
| 3 | Blyth | Sharp Stewart | 2-4-0T | 2850 | 1879 | Scrapped 1941. A replica has been built for the Southwold Railway Trust. |
| 4 | Wenhaston | Manning Wardle | 0-6-2T | 1845 | 1914 | Scrapped 1941 |

== Gallery ==
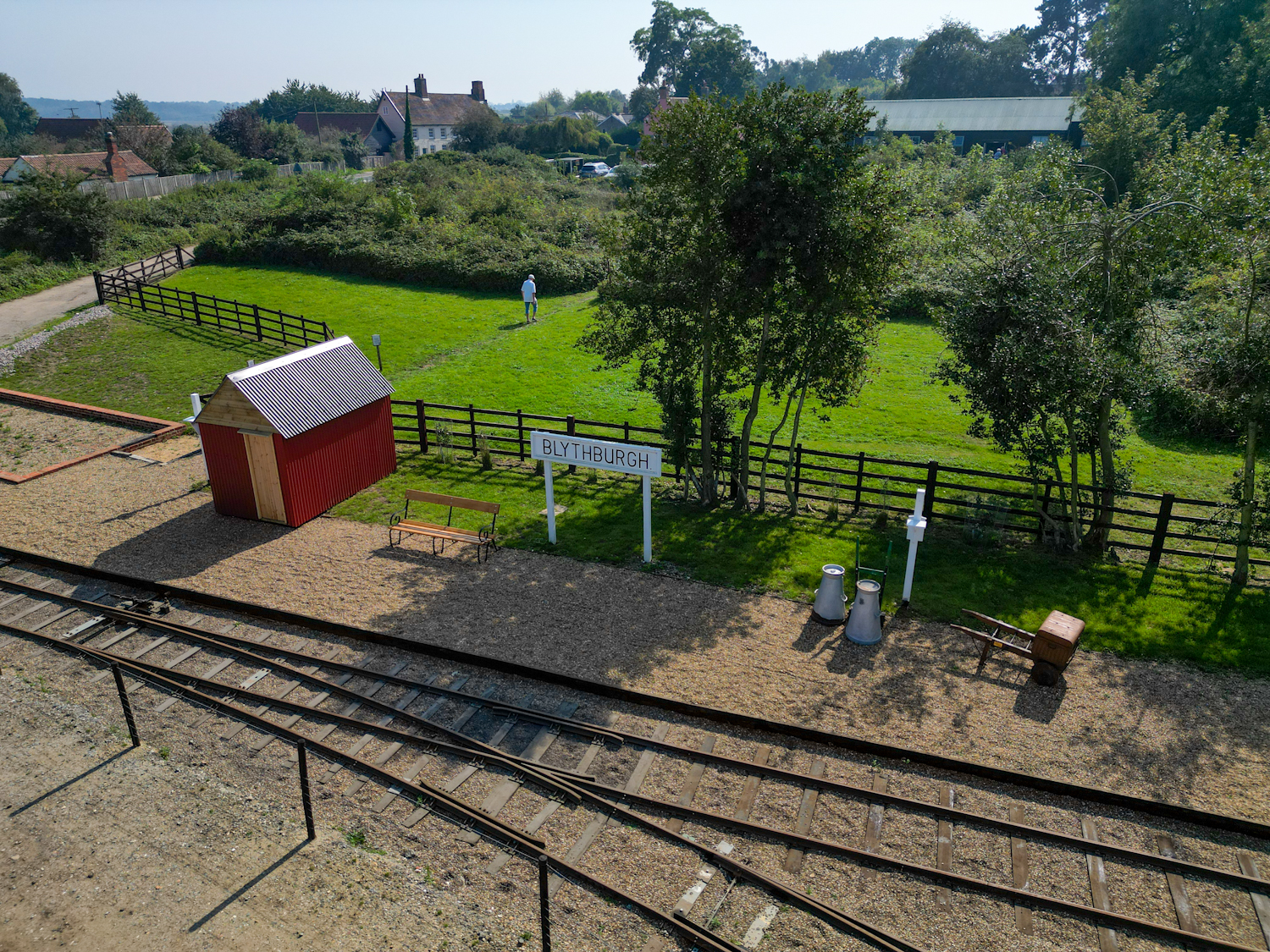
Recreated Blythburgh Station on the exact site of the original

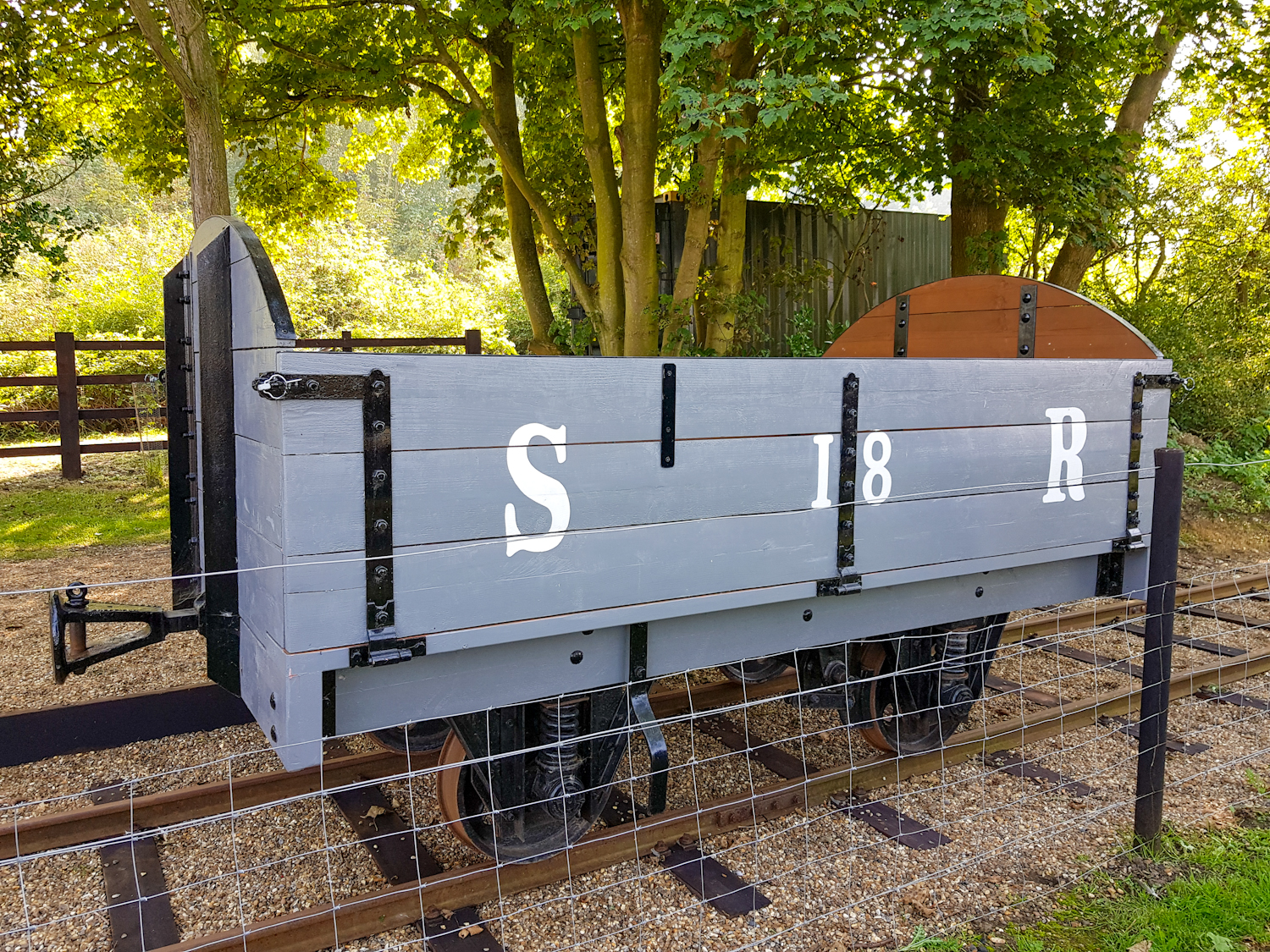
Recreated rolling stock by the H&SNGS

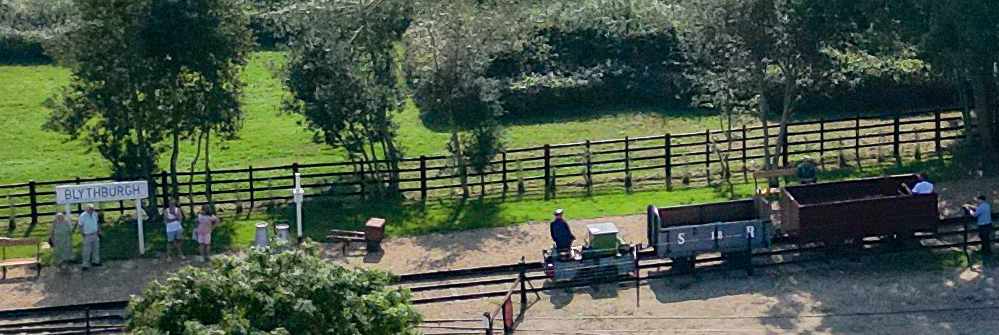
Demonstration train within confines of the recreated Blythburgh Station

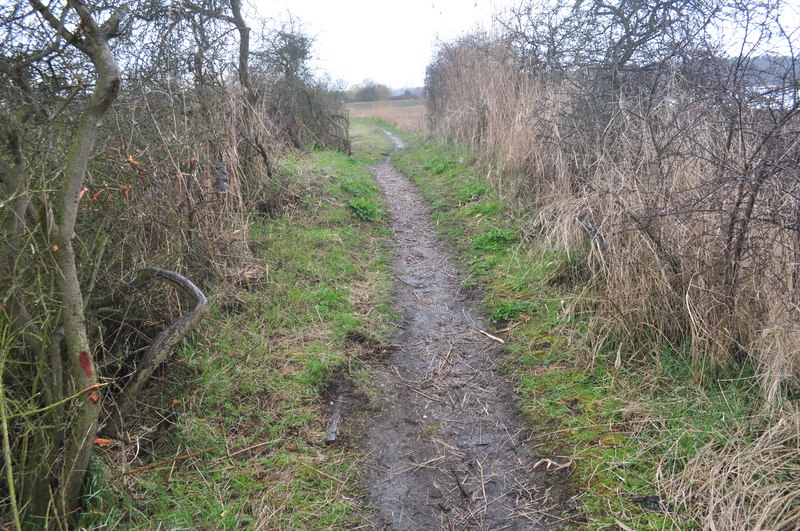
Track bed and another rail at Blythburgh

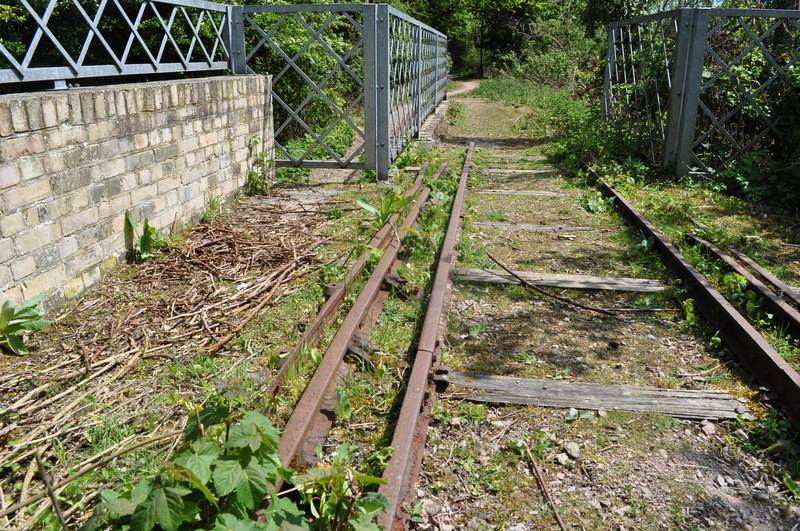
Track at Birds Folly, near Halesworth

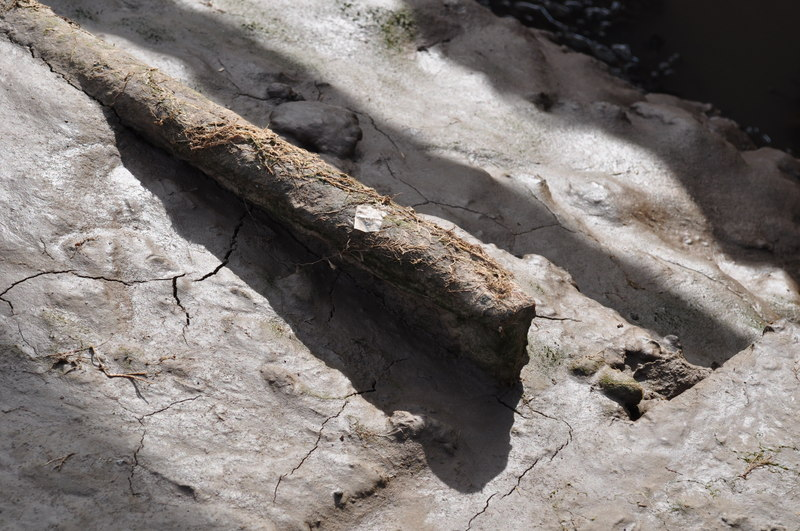
More rails can be seen sinking in the mud

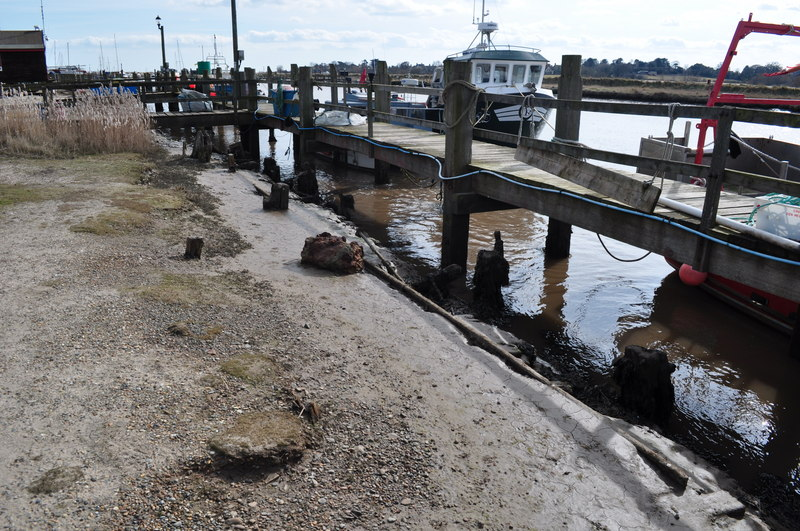
Site of old bridge. Rails can be seen sinking in the mud

== See also ==
- British narrow gauge railways

== Bibliography ==
- Tonks, Eric (1950). The Southwold Railway. Birmingham Locomotive Club.
- Kidner, R.W. (1947). English Narrow Gauge Railways (3rd ed.). Oakwood Press.
- Mitchell, V.; Smith, K. (1984). Branch Line to Southwold. Middleton Press. ISBN 0-906520-15-0.
- Taylor, Alan; Tonks, Eric (1965). The Southwold Railway. Ian Allan Publishing.
- Crush, Peter A. (January–February 2022). "Will Jackson's Chinese Dragons and the Southwold Railway". Journal of the Stephenson Locomotive Society. 98 (933) – via Internet Archive.
