= Eric Tonks =

English historian (1914–1994)

- Born: 17 July 1914; Birmingham, England
- Died: 26 December 1994 (aged 80); Birmingham, England
- Occupation: Writer
- Children: 2
- Writing career
- Period: 1943–1992
- Genres: Industrial history, Jazz
- Subjects: Railways, quarrying, industrial history, jazz
- Notable work: The Ironstone Quarries of the Midlands
- Notable awards: MSc, FRIC, Dip Maths

Eric Tonks (17 July 1914 – 26 December 1994) was an English writer and historian of British industrial railways. He is regarded as one of the pioneers of the industrial archaeology of railways and quarrying. He was also a noted jazz discographer.

== Industrial railways ==
In 1949, Tonks was one of the founders of the Birmingham Locomotive Club and he was the club's president for 25 years. He also set up the club's Industrial Locomotive Section, which later became the Industrial Railway Society. He compiled a well-regarded study of the development of British preserved railways.

== Author ==
Tonks was a prolific author on the related subjects of industrial history and industrial railways. He began his writing career with a book on the Edge Hill Light Railway, and he was an acknowledged expert in the history of that railway.

He is particularly known for his "magnum opus" nine-volume series of books on the ironstone industry of the Midlands, which is considered the standard work on the subject. Tonks began work on this series with the publication of a single volume in 1959. This was expanded into nine volumes in the 1980s and 1990s. These books are acknowledged, as a "great work...on industrial infrastructure" and the 1959 edition was one of the first books to integrate the study of industrial railway history with the wider historical and social aspects of the industries they served.

== Other interests ==
Tonks was a founding member of the Motor Registration Circuit, a club based in the Midlands for car license plate-spotting enthusiasts. He was considered an expert in this field. He was also a well-known jazz aficionado, who wrote a regular column for Discography magazine and was considered an expert in the field of jazz discographies.

== Works ==
=== Ironstone Quarries ===
Originally published as:

- Tonks, Eric (1959). The Ironstone Railways and Tramways of the Midlands.

Full series:

- Tonks, Eric (April 1988). The Ironstone Quarries of the Midlands Part 1: Introduction. Cheltenham: Runpast Publishing. ISBN 1-870-754-018.
- Tonks, Eric (April 1988). The Ironstone Quarries of the Midlands Part 2: The Oxfordshire Field. Cheltenham: Runpast Publishing. ISBN 1-870-754-026.
- Tonks, Eric (April 1989). The Ironstone Quarries of the Midlands Part 3: The Northampton Area. Cheltenham: Runpast Publishing. ISBN 1-870-754-034.
- Tonks, Eric (May 1990). The Ironstone Quarries of the Midlands Part 4: The Wellingborough Area. Cheltenham: Runpast Publishing. ISBN 1-870-754-042.
- Tonks, Eric (1991). The Ironstone Quarries of the Midlands Part 5: The Kettering Area. Cheltenham: Runpast Publishing. ISBN 1-870-754-050.
- Tonks, Eric (1992). The Ironstone Quarries of the Midlands Part 6: The Corby Area. Cheltenham: Runpast Publishing. ISBN 1-870-754-069.
- Tonks, Eric (October 1989). The Ironstone Quarries of the Midlands Part 7: Rutland. Cheltenham: Runpast Publishing. ISBN 1-870-754-077.
- Tonks, Eric (1991). The Ironstone Quarries of the Midlands Part 8: South Lincolnshire. Cheltenham: Runpast Publishing. ISBN 1-870-754-093.
- Tonks, Eric (1992). The Ironstone Quarries of the Midlands Part 9: Leicestershire. Cheltenham: Runpast Publishing. ISBN 1-870-754-085.

=== Other books ===
- Tonks, Eric (1948). The Edge Hill Light Railway.
- Tonks, Eric (1950). The Southwold Railway. Birmingham Locomotive Club.
- Tonks, Eric (1972). The Shropshire & Montgomeryshire Railway. Industrial Railway Society.
- Tonks, Eric (1962). The Industrial Locomotive of the North Riding of Yorkshire. Birmingham Locomotive Club.
- Tonks, Eric (1962). Light & Miniature Locomotives of Great Britain. Birmingham Locomotive Club.
- Taylor, Alan; Tonks, Eric (1965). The Southwold Railway. Ian Allan Publishing.
- Tonks, Eric (1974). The Snailbeach District Railways. Industrial Railway Society.
- Tonks, Eric (1985). Railway Preservation in Britain: 1950–1984.
