= River Blyth, Suffolk =

River in east Suffolk, England

Blyth
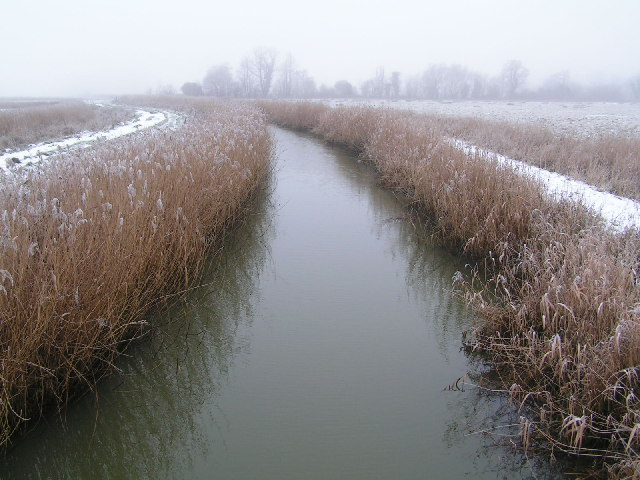
- The River Blyth near Wenhaston.

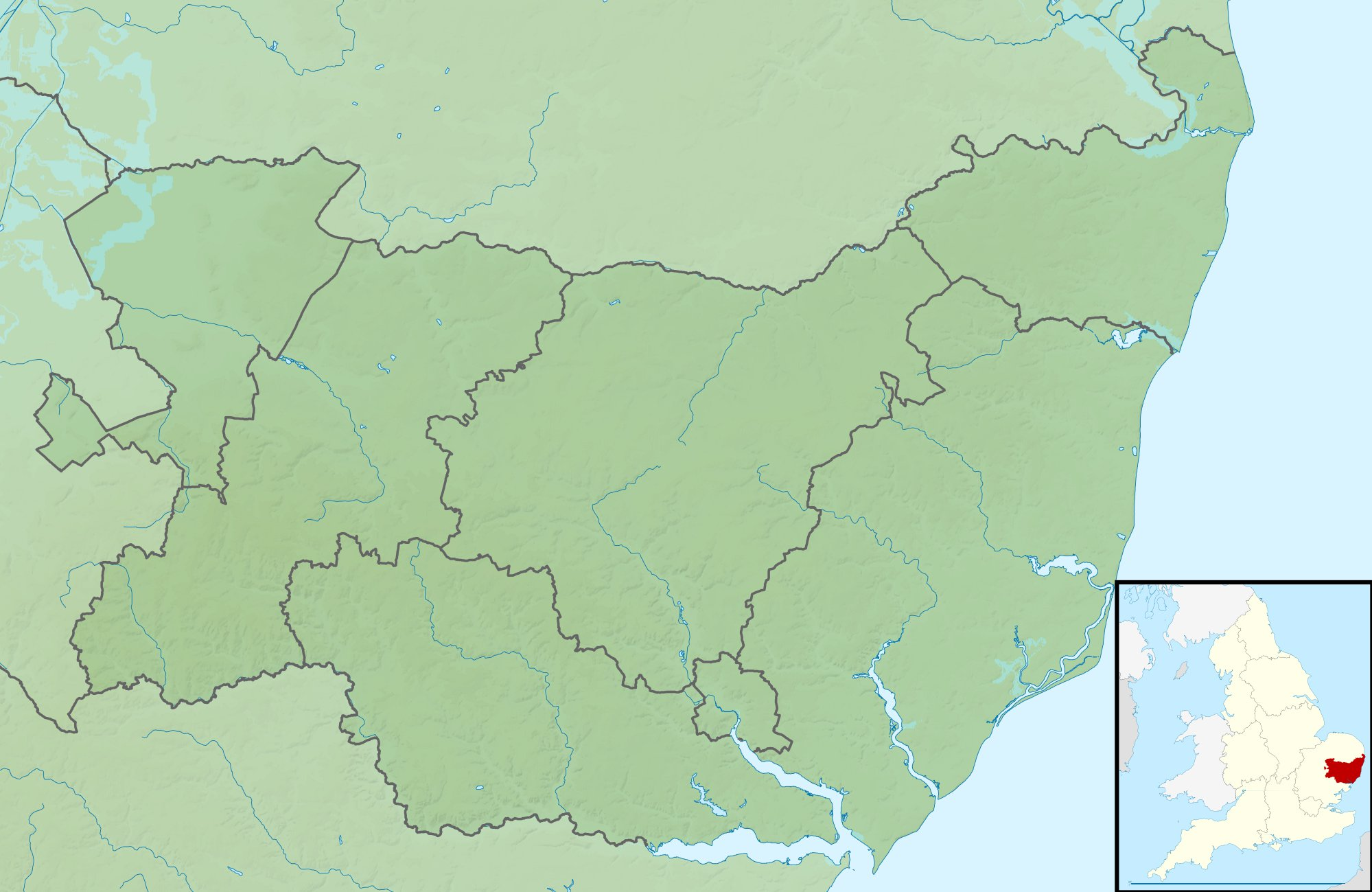
- Location of the river mouth within Suffolk

Location
- Country: England
- Region: Suffolk

Physical characteristics
- Source: Laxfield
  - coordinates: 52.2995°N 1.3398°E
  - elevation: 58 m (190 ft)
- Mouth: North Sea near Walberswick
  - coordinates: 52.3133°N 1.675°E
  - elevation: 0 m (0 ft)
- Length: 30.5 km (19.0 mi)

The River Blyth (/ˈblaɪð/ BLYDHE) is a river in east Suffolk, England. Its source is near Laxfield and it reaches a tidal estuary on the North Sea coast between Southwold and Walberswick.

== Course ==
The course of the river passes through agricultural land between Laxfield and Halesworth, flowing through the estate of Heveningham Hall and the village of Walpole before being crossed by the A144 road and the East Suffolk Line to the south of Halesworth. East of Halesworth the river is canalised in places and has a clear flood plain with land being used as grazing marsh. At Blythburgh it is crossed by the A12 trunk road before entering the estuarine section of the river.

The estuary mouth forms the main harbour area of Southwold and is still an active fishing harbour. The estuary is central to the plot of Peter Greenaway's film Drowning by Numbers, being the scene of the final drowning. The river can be crossed by pedestrians by a public footbridge called the Bailey Bridge about a mile upstream from the sea or by the Walberswick rowing boat ferry.

== Navigation ==
The Blyth Navigation canal was opened in 1761 running 7 miles (11 km) from Halesworth to the Blyth estuary, leading to the canalisation of the river east of Halesworth. It was insolvent by 1884, partly due to attempts to reclaim saltings at Blythburgh, which resulted in the estuary silting up and partly due to the opening of the Southwold Railway in 1879. The navigation was used sporadically until 1911, and was not formally abandoned until 1934, when the River Blyth Navigation Act Revocation Order 1934 (SR&O 1934/283) was passed.

== History ==
The river gives its name to the settlements of Blyford, indicating a formerly important ford over the river, and Blythburgh. The river's name itself comes from an Old English word blithe meaning "gentle or pleasant".
