= Blythburgh =

Village in Suffolk, England

Coordinates: 52.321°N 1.598°E

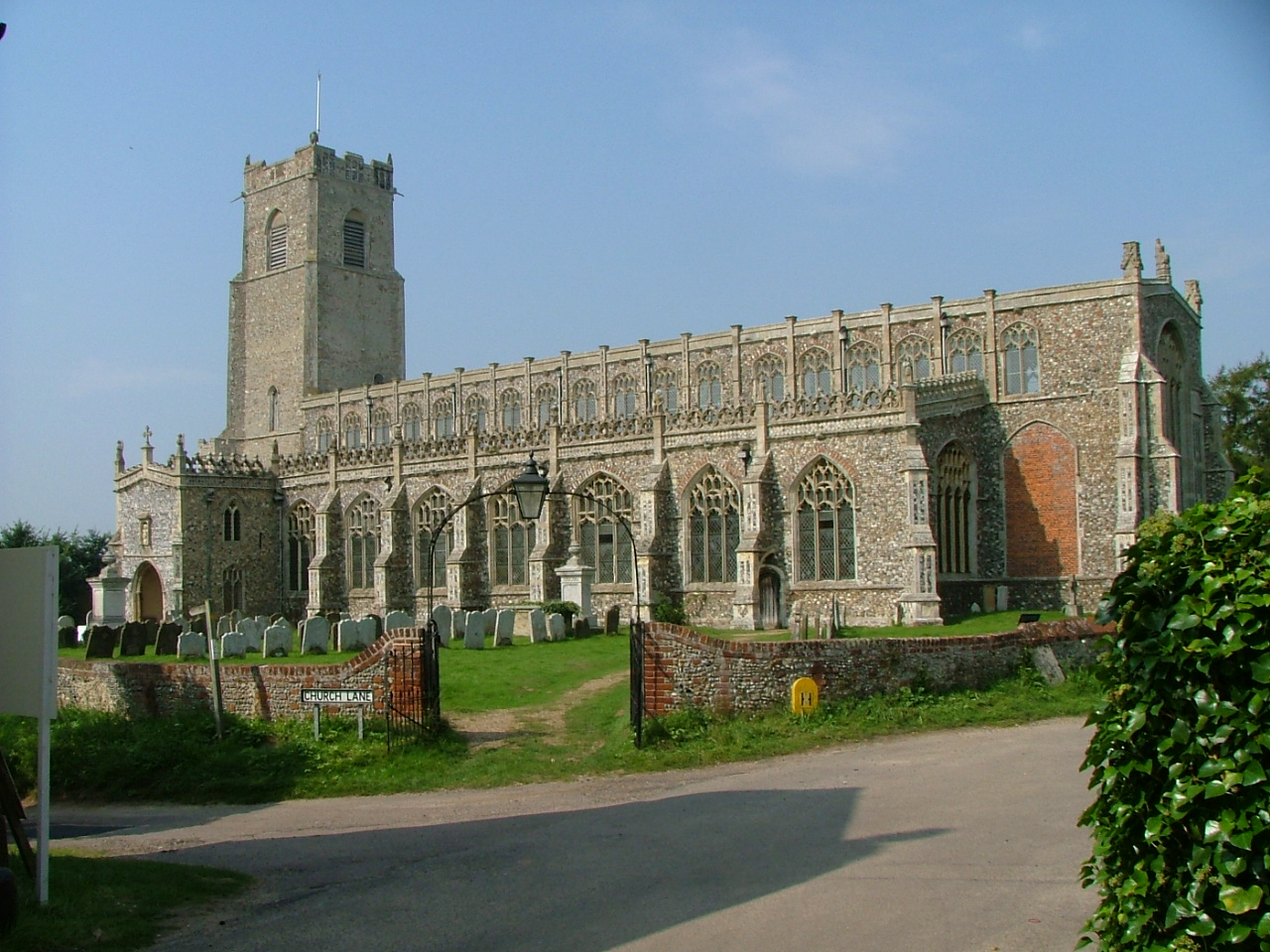
- Holy Trinity Church, Blythburgh

- Location within Suffolk
- Interactive map of Blythburgh
- Population: 297
- OS grid reference: TM4575
- District: East Suffolk
- Shire county: Suffolk
- Region: East
- Country: England
- Sovereign state: United Kingdom
- Post town: Halesworth
- Postcode district: IP19
- Dialling code: 01502
- UK Parliament: Suffolk Coastal

Blythburgh (/ˈblaɪðbərə/ BLYDHE-bər-ə) is a village and civil parish in the East Suffolk district of the English county of Suffolk. It is 4 miles (6.4 km) west of Southwold and 5 miles (8.0 km) south-east of Halesworth and lies on the River Blyth. The A12 road runs through the village which is split either side of the road. At the 2011 census the population of the parish was 297. The parish includes the hamlets of Bulcamp and Hinton.

Blythburgh is best known for its church, Holy Trinity, known as the Cathedral of the Marshes. The church has been floodlit since the 1960s and is a landmark for travellers on the A12. The village is the site of Blythburgh Priory, which was founded by Augustinian canons regular from St Osyth's Priory in Essex in the 12th century. The priory was suppressed in 1537 and ruins remain at the site.

The village is in the area of the Suffolk Coast and Heaths Area of Outstanding Natural Beauty in the area known as the Suffolk Sandlings. It is close to the Suffolk heritage coast located close to an area of marshland and mudflats along the River Blyth which were flooded in 1940 as part of British anti-invasion preparations at the start of the Second World War.

== History ==
North of the village is the site of the Battle of Bulcamp which occurred in 653 or 654 between the forces of Anna of East Anglia and Penda of Mercia. Anna, the King of East Anglia, was defeated and killed along with his son Jurmin. Both are believed to have been buried at the site of Blythburgh Priory.

At the Domesday Survey in 1086 Blythburgh was a very large village with 42 households. It was called Bledeburo, Blieburc or Blideburc and formed part of King William's holdings. It was an important port at this time and was taxed 3000 herring each year. Bulcamp and Hinton were both listed separately with eight households each. Both were held by Roger Bigot.

Blythburgh Priory was founded by canons regular from St Osyth's Priory in Essex in the 12th century. The priory was suppressed in 1537 and ruins remain at the site. The site is a scheduled monument. It was partially excavated in 2008 by Channel Four's Time Team programme.

The River Blyth had largely silted by the 18th century. By the 1750s merchants from the nearby town of Halesworth were keen to open the river for trade. An Act of Parliament was passed in 1757 and, after four locks were built, the river was open for vessels by 1761. By the end of the 19th century silting of the river downstream from Blythburgh made trade difficult and the locks were finally closed in 1934. Bulcamp, on the northern edge of the parish, was the site of the Blything Union workhouse. It was built in 1765–66 and later became a geriatric hospital. It has now been converted to residential use.

Joseph P. Kennedy Jr., eldest brother of US President John F. Kennedy, was killed when his aircraft exploded around 1 mile (1.6 km) south of the village during World War II. Kennedy and Lieutenant Wilford John Willy were piloting a BQ-8 "robot" aircraft (a converted B-24 Liberator) for the U.S. Navy's first mission in Operation Aphrodite.

== Geography ==
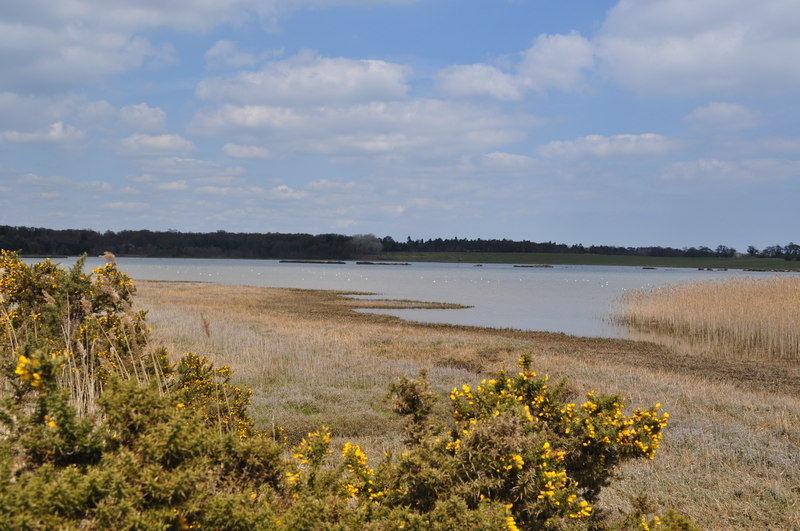
Marshes on the River Blyth at Blythburgh

The milestone alongside the A12 shows that the village is 30 miles (48 km) north of Ipswich and 24 miles (39 km) south of Great Yarmouth. Standing beside the road, the White Hart Inn owned by Southwold-based Adnams Brewery, dates from the 16th century and is known for its Dutch gable ends to the building and beamed interior. Henham Park, the home of the Rous family, is partially within the parish. It is the site of the annual Latitude Festival. The majority of the land to the south of the village is owned by the Blois family, formerly from Cockfield Hall. The parish includes Bulcamp to the north and Hinton to the south-east.

The village is noteworthy for the large area of flooded marshes around the estuary of the River Blyth. The river flows from west of Halesworth to the North Sea between Southwold and Walberswick, although it originally reached the sea at Dunwich. Southwold is reached by the A1095 road with views over the river and the adjacent Hen Reedbeds bird reserve.

Blythburgh railway station linked the village to Halesworth and Southwold on the Southwold Railway. The railway was a 3 ft (914 mm) narrow gauge line which operated between 1879 and 1929.

Blythburgh Station is in the process of being restored, currently there is a period platform, with a length of operating track, sidings and other infrastructure. The once derelict coal shed has been completely restored and is used for railway operations.

A 3ft gauge battery electric locomotive 'Greenbat' hauls replica rolling stock on open days.

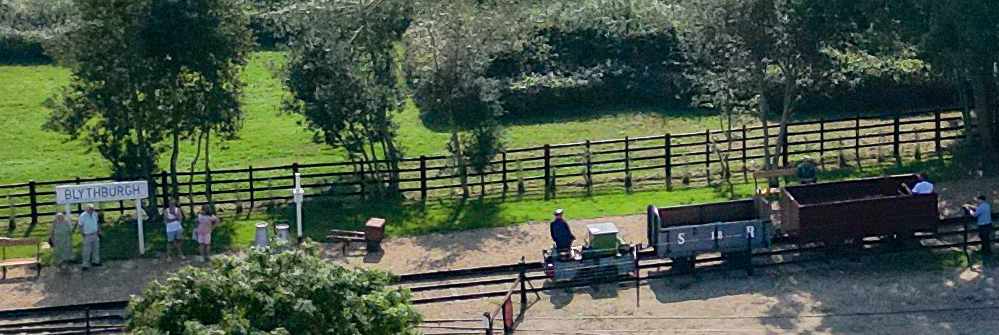
Demonstration train within the confines of the recreated Blythburgh Station

== Holy Trinity Church ==
The parish church is dedicated to the Holy Trinity. Known as the Cathedral of the Marshes, Blythburgh was one of the earliest Christian sites in East Anglia and a church is believed to have been located here in the 7th century. The current church is a Grade I Listed building dating from the 14th and 15th centuries. On 4 August 1577 a ghostly black dog known as Black Shuck is said to have appeared at the church.

== Notable people ==
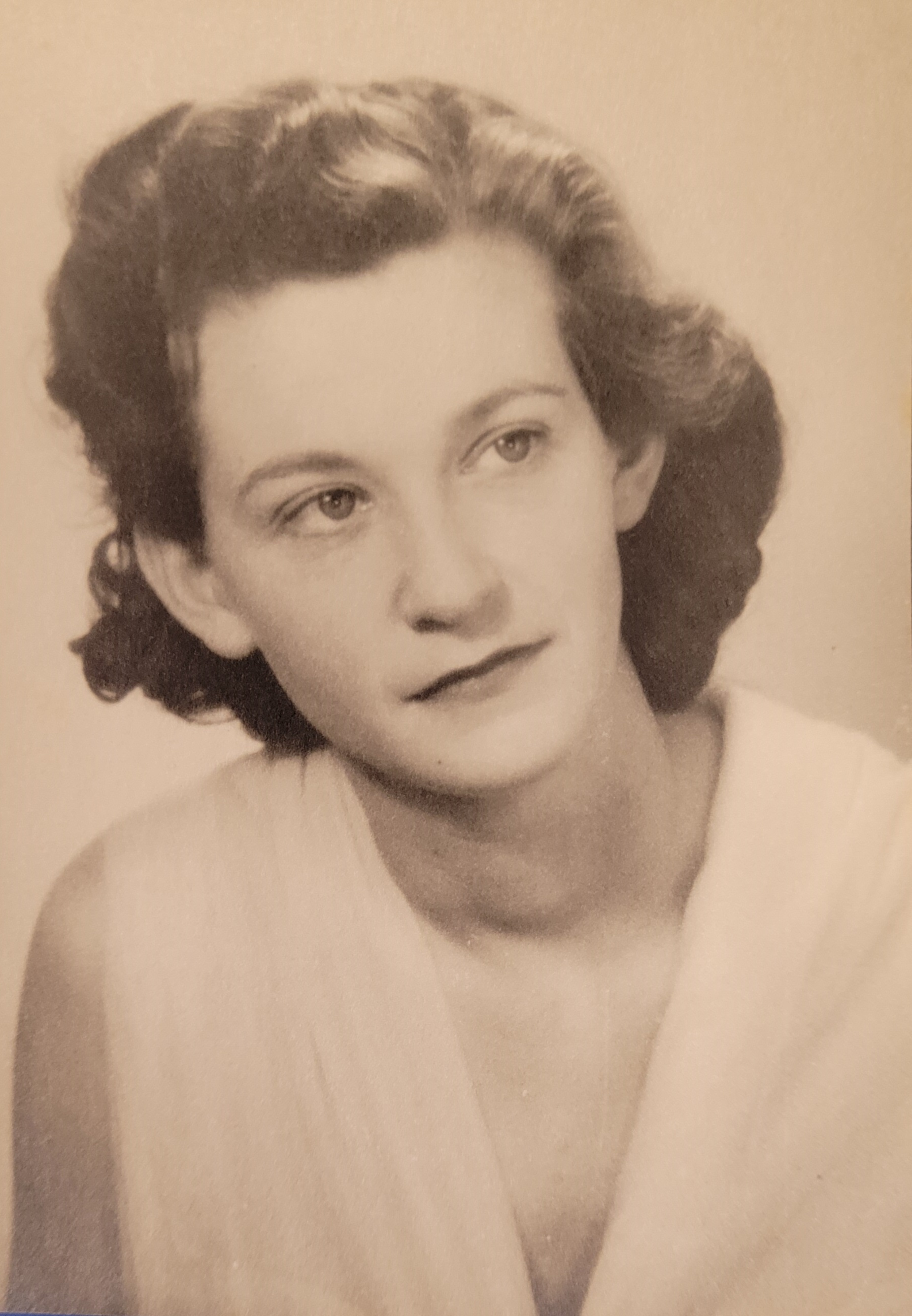
Portrait of Doreen Carwithen

Blythburgh is mentioned in the song "Black Shuck", from rock band The Darkness, from their album Permission To Land. The song centres around a local folk tale.

The following people have been associated with Blythburgh.

- William Alwyn CBE - composer
- Doreen Carwithen - his wife, composer
- Ernest Crofts RA - military artist
- Kenneth Hubbard OBE DFC AFC – RAF pilot, dropped Britain's first live H-Bomb in May 1957
- Simon Loftus OBE – brewer and vintner
- Sir John Seymour Lucas RA – portrait painter
- Jack Pritchard – Isokon designs
- Martin Shaw – hymn music
- Peter Harold Wright VC – World War II Victoria Cross recipient
