= Halesworth =

Town and civil parish in Suffolk, England

Coordinates: 52.342°N 1.506°E

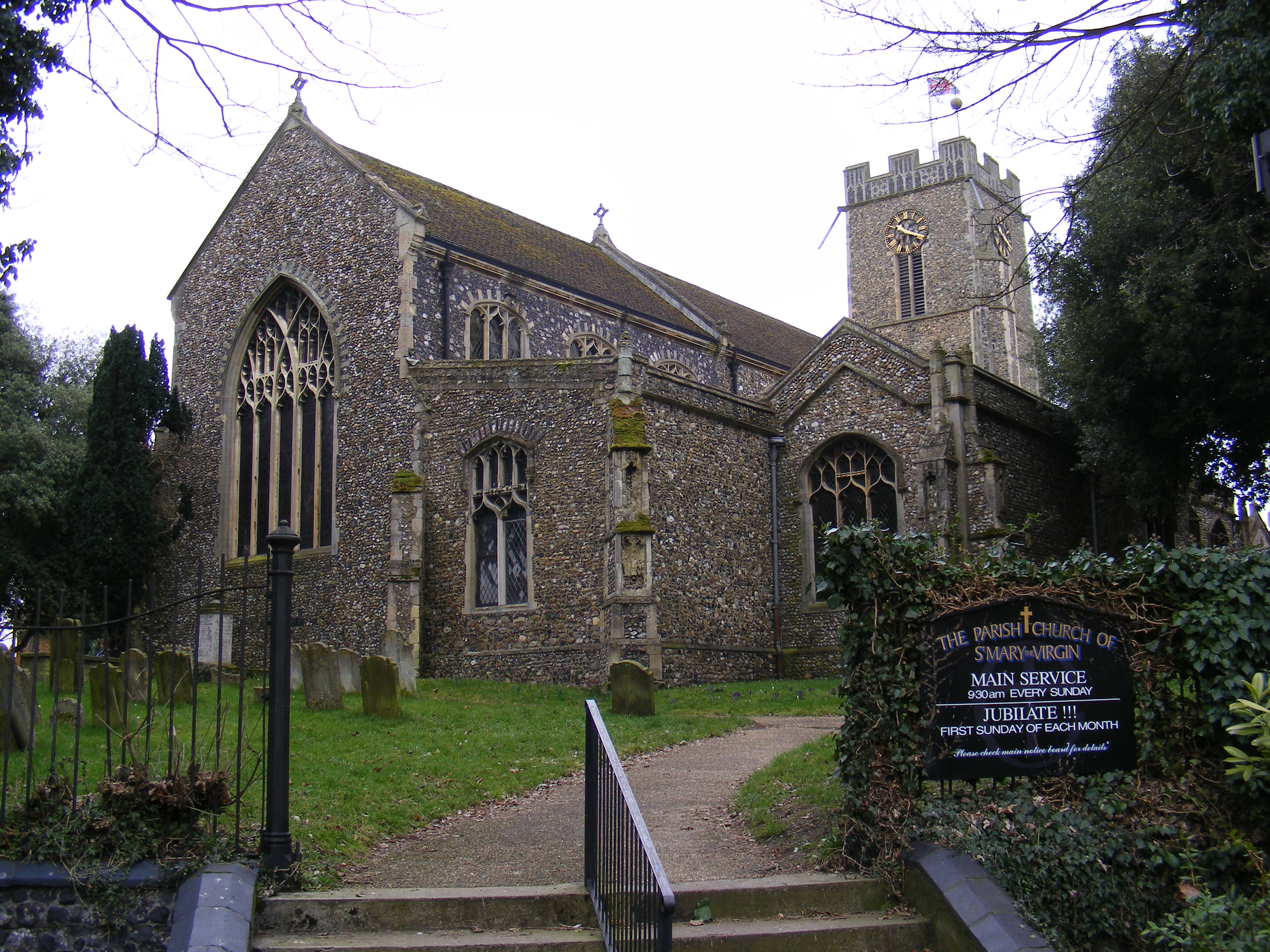
- Church of St Mary, Halesworth

- Location within Suffolk
- Area: 4.47 km^{2} (1.73 sq mi)
- Population: 4,726 (2011 Census)
  - Density: 1,057/km^{2} (2,740/sq mi)
- OS grid reference: TM388773
- District: East Suffolk
- Shire county: Suffolk
- Region: East
- Country: England
- Sovereign state: United Kingdom
- Post town: HALESWORTH
- Postcode district: IP19
- Dialling code: 01986
- Police: Suffolk
- Fire: Suffolk
- Ambulance: East of England
- UK Parliament: Waveney Valley

Halesworth is a market town, civil parish and electoral ward in north-eastern Suffolk, England. The population stood at 4,726 in the 2011 Census. It lies 15 miles (24 km) south-west of Lowestoft, on a tributary of the River Blyth, nine miles (fourteen kilometres) upstream from Southwold. The town is served by Halesworth railway station on the Ipswich–Lowestoft East Suffolk Line. It is twinned with Bouchain in France and Eitorf in Germany. Nearby villages include Cratfield, Wissett, Chediston, Walpole, Blyford, Linstead Parva, Wenhaston, Thorington, Spexhall, Bramfield, Huntingfield, Cookley and Holton.

== History ==
A Roman settlement, Halesworth has a medieval church; St Mary's with Victorian additions and a variety of houses, from early timber-framed buildings to the remnants of Victorian prosperity.

The place name 'Halesworth' is first attested in the Domesday Book of 1086, where it appears as Healesuurda and Halesuuorda. The name means 'Hæle's homestead'.

The town's Angel Hotel dates from the 16th century. There are historical records of some 30 pubs in Halesworth.

Joseph Dalton Hooker, the botanist and traveller, lived in Halesworth with his family.

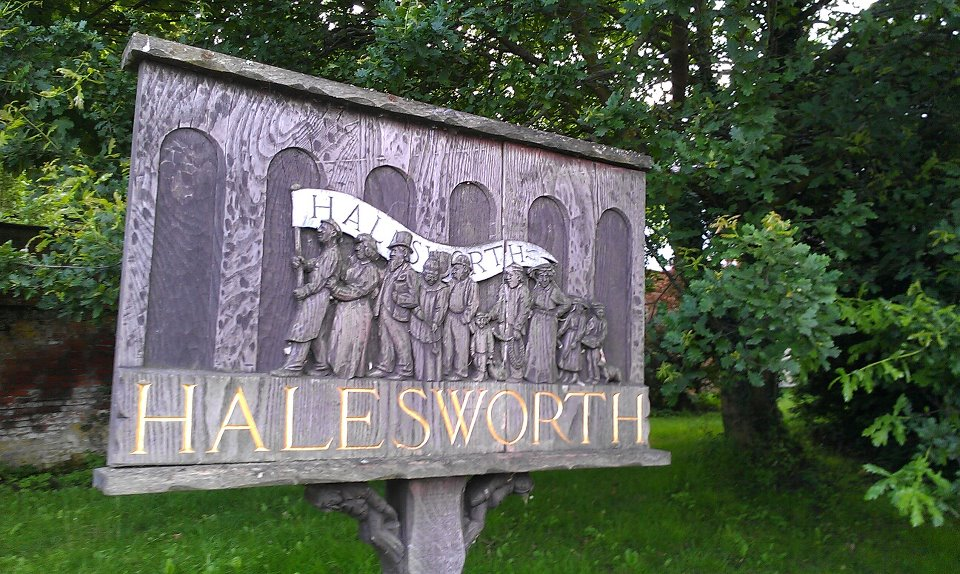
Town sign, as of July 2012

In 1862 the only murder of modern times was recorded. Ebenezer Tye (died 25 November 1862, aged 24) was a policeman who was trying to stop a burglary in Chediston Street. However he was beaten to death and is now buried in Halesworth Cemetery. The murderer, John Ducker, was caught and was the last person to be publicly hanged in Suffolk.

The archives of the Diocese of Norwich record the murder of a chantry priest in Halesworth in medieval times.

== Military history ==
A short distance to the north-east of the town itself, in Holton, lies the Second World War airfield of RAF Halesworth.

The airfield was constructed in 1942–1943, and initially the 56th Fighter Group of the United States 8th Army Air Force were stationed there. In 1944, it became the base of the 489th Bomb Group flying B24 Liberators. They played a part in the build-up and conduct of the D-Day, from 6 June 1944. From July they switched to strategic offensive bombing until November, when they ceased operations to return to America.

Between January and June 1945, the 5th Emergency Rescue Squadron operated from the base, flying "war-weary" P47 and B17 aircraft. Their mission was to carry dinghies and smoke markers to aid downed crews found at sea. The airfield closed for flying in February 1946. Today it is an industrial site owned by Bernard Matthews Ltd, but there is a museum.

In 1862 the Rifle Hall was presented to the town by the family of a late captain of the rifle corps, Andrew Johnston. It is so called because it was used as a drill hall by the rifle corps.

The hall was originally built in 1792 as a theatre and was used from 1812 to 1844 by the theatre manager David Fisher. He owned an itinerant theatre group which travelled a circuit of theatres in East Anglia (including the Fisher Theatre in Bungay which has now been fully restored).

== Governance ==
Since 2019, Halesworth has been governed by East Suffolk district council and Suffolk County Council. Between 1974 and 2019 it was part of the Waveney district. Prior to 1974, local government functions had been carried out by Halesworth Urban District Council.

Halesworth Town Council was also formed in 1974. The 12 Town Councillors are elected every four years. The chairman and vice-chair are elected by fellow councillors and usually serve for two years in office.

== Economy and infrastructure ==
A Halesworth bank used to issue its own banknotes. A five guinea banknote (£5.25), issued by the Suffolk and Halesworth Bank in 1799, is to be found in the Coins and Medals Collection at the British Museum, and the Museum also holds later examples.

Former almshouses used to house the Halesworth & District Museum (open from May to September) but this has now been moved to Halesworth railway station.

== Transport ==
Halesworth railway station is connected to Ipswich and Lowestoft. Services are available to Lowestoft and Ipswich and are run by Greater Anglia. Other dates of importance to rail travel are 1854, when the railway arrived in Halesworth, 1859, when the station moved to its present position as the line was extended to Lowestoft, 1888, when a moveable platform was installed. It was renewed in 1922 and restored in 1999, so allowing the platforms to be extended across the adjacent level crossing. In 1958, Norwich Road railway bridge opened as an alternative to that level crossing.

From 24 September 1879 until 11 April 1929 the narrow-gauge Southwold Railway connected Halesworth to Southwold. There were plans by the Southwold Railway Society to revive the railway, partly on the original track and partly on new formation, but these have now been abandoned in favour of a railway park, to be situated at Southwold.

== Culture and community ==
There is a Town Trail walk.

Halesworth is the home to the New Cut Arts Centre.

The town has the largest Millennium Green in the UK with around 44 acres (18 hectares) of grazing marsh providing a haven for wildlife close to the town centre. The rivers in this area are home to grey herons, common kingfishers and Eurasian otters.

== Notable people ==
- Joseph Dalton Hooker (1817–1911), botanist and explorer

== Landmarks and architecture ==
=== The Thoroughfare ===
Excavations outside the White Hart pub in 1991 discovered part of a causeway – probably dating from the late Saxon period. A piece of oak pile from these excavations is in the Halesworth & District Museum.

There are examples of 16th, 17th, 18th and 19th century buildings in the Thoroughfare. Number 8 is a former ironmonger's. This shop belonged to the grandfather of Sir David Frost and the name of William Frost can still be seen underneath the archway next to the shop.

A block of four shops next to this was originally built in 1474 as the Guildhall. This was the home of the Guild of St John the Baptist and Guild of St Love and St Anthony.

=== St Mary's Church ===
Halesworth is mentioned in the Domesday Book of 1086, recording Ulf the priest to be in charge of the parish.

The present church is essentially early 15th century, with outer aisles built and restoration taking place in the late 19th century. At the time of the restoration, some evidence was uncovered of a round-tower church on the site. The carved Danestones in the church, depicting hands clutching foliage or tails, were found in the church during the 19th century and could be part of a cross shaft. Their original location is unknown, as is their date. However, Pevsner in The Buildings of England mentions them as being part of an Anglo-Saxon frieze, with a suggested date of the later 9th century.

St Mary's became the centre of the eight-parish Halesworth Team Ministry in the 1980s. With the 1996 addition of the parishes of Bramfield, Thorington and Wenhaston, it is now part of the Blyth Valley Team Ministry of eleven parishes.

The statue of the Madonna and Child in the Lady Chapel was fashioned from driftwood by Peter Eugene Ball.

== Media ==
Local news and television programmes are provided by BBC East and ITV Anglia. Television signals are received from the Tacolneston TV transmitter. Local radio stations are BBC Radio Suffolk on 95.5 FM, Heart East on 102.4 FM, Greatest Hits Radio East (The Beach) on 97.4 FM, and Kiss on 106.1 FM. The town is served by the local newspapers, Beccles and Bungay Journal and Eastern Daily Press.

== Sports ==
Halesworth has a 27-hole golf club. Halesworth Town F.C. and Wenhaston United F.C. are the local football clubs. Halesworth also has a tennis club with courts and a bowls club, both located at the Dairy Hill area.

== See also ==
- RAF Halesworth
