= A1095 road =

Road in Suffolk, England

Coordinates: 52.3381°N 1.6471°E

A1095

Route information
- Length: 4.0 mi (6.4 km)

Major junctions
- West end: A12
- A12; B1126 to Wangford; B1127 to Wrentham
- East end: Southwold

Location
- Country: United Kingdom
- Constituent country: England

Road network
- Roads in the United Kingdom; Motorways; A and B road zones

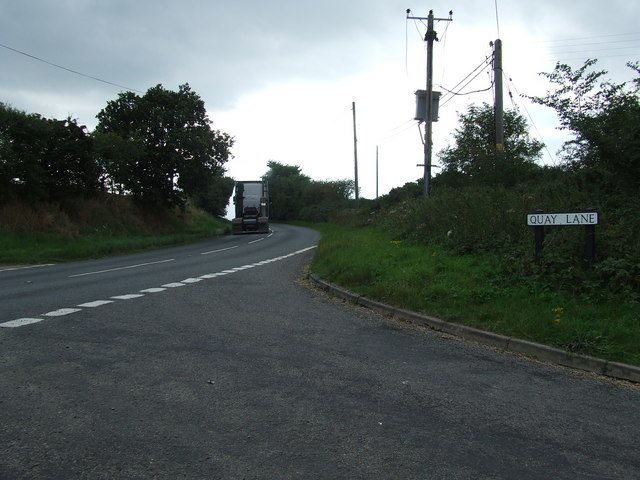
Quay Lane meeting the A1095 west of Reydon

The A1095 road is an A road in the English county of Suffolk. It runs from Southwold on the North Sea coast to the A12 London to Lowestoft road at Henham between Blythburgh and Wangford. It is around 4 miles (6.4 km) in length and is single carriageway throughout. The entire length of the road lies within the Suffolk Coast and Heaths Area of Outstanding Natural Beauty.

== Route description ==
Beginning at Southwold market place, the A1095 forms the town's High Street. It passes close to Southwold lighthouse and Adnams Brewery before becoming Station Road. It runs past the site of the former Southwold railway station before becoming Mights Road and crossing Buss Creek at Mights Bridge. The road now runs through Reydon, first as Bridge Foot Corner before becoming Halesworth Road, the name it retains along the rest of its route.

Junctions with the B1127 Lowestoft Road, leading to the A12 at Wrentham, and the B1126 Wangford Road are passed. At the western edge of Reydon the road passes Saint Felix School, an independent day and boarding school established in 1897. Running north of the River Blyth, it then passes the distribution depot for Adnams which opened in 2007, before crossing Wolsey's Creek. Hen Reedbeds, part of the Minsmere-Walberswick Heaths and Marshes Site of Special Scientific Interest and the Suffolk Coast National Nature Reserve, is adjacent to the road and is an important site for birds such as bitterns and marsh harriers. The reserve is owned by the Suffolk Wildlife Trust and is managed in conjunction with Natural England and the RSPB.

The A1095 then runs through a wooded area at Bulcamp, part of the parish of Blythburgh. The Battle of Bulcamp occurred here in 653 or 654 AD between the forces of Anna of East Anglia and Penda of Mercia. Anna, the King of East Anglia, was defeated and killed along with his son Jurmin. Both are believed to have been buried at Blythburgh Priory. The road reaches the A12 about 0.7 miles (1.1 km) north of Blythburgh close to the junction with the A145 road and opposite Henham Park, the site of the Latitude Festival, a major music and arts festival held annually in July, and the Grand Henham Steam Rally, held in September.
