= List of shipwrecks in November 1855 =

The following ships were sunk, foundered, grounded, or otherwise lost during November 1855.

== 1 November ==
List of shipwrecks: 1 November 1855
Ship	State	Description
Antillus	United Kingdom	The brig ran aground on the Herd Sand, in the North Sea off the coast of County Durham.
Frau Anna	Hamburg	The ship was driven ashore and wrecked near Cleethorpes, Lincolnshire, United Kingdom. She was on a voyage from Wick, Caithness to Hamburg.
Meurida	Norway	The ship was driven ashore and wrecked north of Whitby, Yorkshire, United Kingdom with the loss of three of her crew. She was on a voyage from Newcastle upon Tyne, Northumberland, United Kingdom to Grimstad.
Nautilus	United Kingdom	The ship ran aground on the Herd Sand. Her crew were rescued. She was refloated on 3 November and taken in to South Shields.
Pacific	United Kingdom	The steamship ran aground in the Dardanelles. She was on a voyage from Greenhithe, Kent to Constantinople, Ottoman Empire. She was refloated the next day with the assistance of a French Navy tug.
Perseverance	United Kingdom	The sloop was driven ashore at Tetney, Lincolnshire. She was refloated on 8 November and taken in to Grimsby for repairs.
Samson	United Kingdom	The ship was driven ashore and wrecked at Amlwch, Anglesey. She was on a voyage from Liverpool, Lancashire to Amlwch.
Sovereign	United Kingdom	The barque was driven ashore and wrecked at Sand Hale, Lincolnshire. She was on a voyage from Antwerp, Belgium to South Shields, County Durham. She was refloated on 10 November and taken in to Grimsby.
Tower	United Kingdom	The ship was wrecked at Amlwch. She was on a voyage from Liverpool to Amlwch.
HMS Waterwitch	Royal Navy	The Waterwitch-class brig-sloop sank at Sheerness, Kent.

== 2 November ==
List of shipwrecks: 2 November 1855
Ship	State	Description
Dasher	United Kingdom	The schooner ran aground at Cardiff, Glamorgan. She was on a voyage from Bideford to Plymouth, Devon.
Eclipse	United Kingdom	The ship departed from Saugor for Mauritius. No further trace, presumed foundered with the loss of all hands.
Hartlepool	United Kingdom	The brig was abandoned in the North Sea off Flamborough Head, Yorkshire. Her crew were rescued by a fishing smack. She was on a voyage from Hamburg to South Shields, County Durham.
Manchester	United Kingdom	The ship was driven ashore at Port-en-Bessin, Calvados, France. Her crew were rescued.
Margaret	United Kingdom	The ship was wrecked off Agalaga Island, Mauritius. Her crew were rescued. She was on a voyage from London to Kurrachee, India.
Persian	United Kingdom	The ship ran aground on the Burbo Bank, in Liverpool Bay. She was on a voyage from Liverpool, Lancashire to Salonica, Greece. She was refloated and taken in to the River Mersey.
Sunbeam	United Kingdom	The brig was driven ashore at Sandhale, Lincolnshire. Her crew were rescued. She was on a voyage from Hamburg to Middlesbrough, Yorkshire.

== 3 November ==
List of shipwrecks: 3 November 1855
Ship	State	Description
Abigail	United Kingdom	The schooner was wrecked on Middle Mouse, Anglesey. Her crew were rescued by the steamship Emerald (United Kingdom). Abigail was on a voyage from Liverpool, Lancashire to Dunkerque, Nord, France.
Albion	United Kingdom	The ketch was driven ashore and wrecked at Orfordness, Suffolk. Her crew were rescued by the keepers of the Orfordness Low Light. She was on a voyage from Rye, Sussex to Sunderland, County Durham.
Alexander	United Kingdom	The collier was driven ashore at Orford Haven, Suffolk.
Alexandrina	United Kingdom	The ship was driven ashore and wrecked at Hollesley, Suffolk. She was on a voyage from London to South Shields, County Durham.
Amia Berendina	Netherlands	The ship was driven ashore at Bawdsey, Suffolk. She was refloated on 25 November and taken in to Harwich, Essex, United Kingdom.
Anna	Kingdom of Hanover	The galiot ran aground on the Herd Sand, in the North Sea off the coast of County Durham. She was refloated the next day and taken in to South Shields.
Anna Catherine	United Kingdom	The brig ran aground on the Green Banks, in the Bristol Channel off the coast of Glamorgan, and sank. Her crew were rescued the next day by the tug Beaufort (United Kingdom).
Anne	Netherlands	The ship was driven ashore at Aldeburgh, Suffolk.
Argo	United Kingdom	The collier was driven ashore at Orford Haven.
Armina	United Kingdom	The ship was driven ashore and wrecked at Hollesley.
Atalanta	United Kingdom	The collier was driven ashore at Kessingland, Suffolk. Her crew were rescued.
Atlantic	United Kingdom	The collier was driven ashore at Kessingland. Her crew were rescued. She was on a voyage from Great Yarmouth, Norfolk to Swansea, Glamorgan.
Atlas	United Kingdom	The collier was driven ashore at Orford Haven.
Balmoral	United Kingdom	The ship was driven ashore at Kessingland. She was refloated on 13 November and taken in to Lowestoft, Suffolk.
Blue-eyed Maid	United Kingdom	The collier was driven ashore at Orford Haven.
Cape Horn	United Kingdom	The barque was driven ashore and wrecked at Southwold. Her crew were rescued.
Charlotte Mary	United Kingdom	The Yorkshire Billyboy was driven ashore and wrecked between Aldeburgh and Thorpeness with the loss of six of the seven people on board. She was on a voyage from Norwich, Norfolk to London.
Clio	United Kingdom	The ship was driven ashore at Great Yarmouth. She was on a voyage from Harburg, Hamburg to South Shields.
Concord	United Kingdom	The collier was driven ashore at Orford Haven. Her crew were rescued. She subsequently became a wreck.
Coromandel	United Kingdom	The schooner was driven ashore at Walmer Castle, Kent. Her crew were rescued. She was on a voyage from Plymouth, Devon to London.
Correggio	United Kingdom	The barque was driven ashore and wrecked between Aldeburgh and Orfordness. Her eleven crew were rescued by the Aldeburgh Lifeboat. She was on a voyage from Poole, Dorset to Hartlepool, County Durham.
Die Traube	Stettin	The brig was driven ashore at the mouth of the River Tees. She was on a voyage from Calais to Stockton-on-Tees, County Durham. She was refloated on 9 November and towed in to Middlesbrough, Yorkshire.
Elvira	United Kingdom	The collier was driven ashore at Kessingland. Her crew were rescued. She was on a voyage from London to South Shields. Elvira was refloated on 24 February 1856 and taken in to Great Yarmouth.
Emma	United Kingdom	The brig was driven ashore at Southwold. Her crew were rescued. She was sold on 14 November but subsequently became a wreck.
Eugenie	France	The brigantine ran aground off the Mumbles, Glamorgan. She was refloated and towed in to Swansea, Glamorgan in a sinking condition.
Fairy	United Kingdom	The ship was driven ashore at Aldeburgh.
Fancy	United Kingdom	The schooner was driven ashore between Aldeburgh and Orfordness. Her crew were rescued by rocket apparatus. She was on a voyage from Dordrecht, South Holland, Netherlands to South Shields, County Durham.
Frederica Heloise	France	The schooner was driven ashore and wrecked between Aldeburgh and Orfordness. Her crew were rescued by rocket apparatus. She was on a voyage from Nantes, Loire-Inférieure to South Shields.
Hannah	China	The ship was driven ashore at Orford Haven.
Hylton Castle	United Kingdom	The brig was driven ashore and wrecked at Southwold. Her crew were rescued.
Jane	United Kingdom	The ship was driven ashore and wrecked between Aldeburgh and Orfordness. Her crew were rescued. She was on a voyage from Dover, Kent to Seaham, County Durham.
Jane Howard	United Kingdom	The barque was driven ashore at Deal, Kent. She was on a voyage from Shoreham-by-Sea, Sussex to Seaham, County Durham. Jane Howars was later refloated and taken in to Sandwich, Kent for repairs.
John and Ann	United Kingdom	The collier was driven ashore and wrecked at Kessingland. Her crew were rescued. She was on a voyage from Newcastle upon Tyne to London.
John Parker	United Kingdom	The brig was driven ashore and wrecked at Sizewell, Suffolk. Her crew were rescued. She was on a voyage from London to Seaham.
Legatus	United Kingdom	The ship was driven ashore at Lowestoft.
Louisa	United Kingdom	The brig was wrecked on the Holme Sand, in the North Sea off the coast of Suffolk. Her crew were rescued by the Lowestoft Lifeboat. She was on a voyage from Newhaven, Sussex to Sunderland.
Maggie	United Kingdom	The collier was driven ashore and wrecked at Orford Haven. She was on a voyage from London to Whitby, Yorkshire.
Marmion	United Kingdom	The collier was driven ashore at Kessingland. Her crew were rescued. She was refloated on 9 November and taken in to Lowestoft.
Martenute	Netherlands	The collier was driven ashore at Orford Haven.
Navigationen	Flag unknown	The ship ran aground on the Whittaker Spit, in the North Sea off the coast of Essex. She was refloated on 9 November.
Nelson	United Kingdom	The brig was driven ashore and wrecked at Southwold. Her crew were rescued.
Ocean	United Kingdom	The brig was driven ashore and wrecked at Southwold. Her crew were rescued.
Orwell Lass	United Kingdom	The collier was driven ashore at Orford Haven. She had become a wreck by 9 November.
Perseverance	United Kingdom	The ship was driven ashore at Aldeburgh and was abandoned by her crew. She was on a voyage from London to King's Lynn, Norfolk. She was subsequently refloated and taken in to harbour in a severely leaky condition.
Pilgrim	United Kingdom	The brig was driven ashore and wrecked at Minsmere, Suffolk, England. Her crew were rescued.
Pilot	United Kingdom	The brig was in collision with Esther (United Kingdom and was abandoned in the English Channel with the loss of a crew member. Survivors were rescued by Esther. Pilot was on a voyage from Cardiff, Glamorgan to London.
Silvanus	United Kingdom	The ship was driven ashore between Aldeburgh and Orfordness. Her crew were rescued. She was declared a total loss.
Superb	United Kingdom	The ship was driven ashore at Aldeburgh. She was on a voyage from Barking, Essex to Sunderland. She was refloated on 14 November. Subsequently repaired and returned to service.
Swallow	United Kingdom	The ship was driven ashore and wrecked at Hollesley.
Swallow	United Kingdom	The collier was driven ashore at Orford Haven.
Sylvanus	United Kingdom	The brig was driven ashore and wrecked at Aldeburgh. Her crew were rescued. She was on a voyage from London to South Shields.
Talbot	United Kingdom	The ship was driven ashore at Kessingland.
Testerin	France	The ship was wrecked on the Kenfig Rocks, on the coast of Glamorgan. Her six crew were rescued.
Three Brothers	United Kingdom	The ship was driven ashore at Aldeburgh. She was on a voyage from Rochester, Kent to Sunderland. She was refloated the next day.
Union	United Kingdom	The brig was driven ashore and wrecked at Aldeburgh. Her crew were rescued. She was on a voyage from London to Sunderland.
Vesta	Sweden	The ship was driven ashore and wrecked near the Orfordness Lighthouse with the loss of two of her crew and a member of the Coast Guard who went to their rescue. She was on a voyage from Haparanda to London.
Waterhouse	United Kingdom	The ship was driven ashore and wrecked 2 nautical miles (3.7 km) north of the Orfordness Lighthouse. Her crew were rescued. She was on a voyage from London to Newcastle upon Tyne
Watermilloch	United Kingdom	The collier was driven ashore at Kessingland. Her crew were rescued.
Wells	United Kingdom	The collier, a schooner, was driven ashore at Orford Haven. She was on a voyage from London to Goole, Yorkshire. She was refloated on 6 November and taken in to Aldeburgh.
William and Mary	United Kingdom	The ship was driven ashore and wrecked at Hollesley.
Yare	United Kingdom	The collier was driven ashore at Kessingland. Her crew were rescued.

== 4 November ==
List of shipwrecks: 4 November 1855
Ship	State	Description
Bellona	Norway	The barque was driven ashore at Grainthorpe, Lincolnshire, United Kingdom. She was on a voyage from Memel, Prussia to Hull, Yorkshire, United Kingdom. She was refloated on 22 January 1856 and towed in to Grimsby, Lincolnshire.
Elizabeth and Sarah	United Kingdom	The brig was driven ashore at Tetney, Lincolnshire. She was on a voyage from Hamburg to Hartlepool, County Durham.
Freja	Norway	The brig was driven ashore near Marshchapel, Lincolnshire. She was on a voyage from Porsgrund to Hartlepool.
Hebron	United Kingdom	The barque struck a sunken rock off Havana, Cuba and was damaged. She was on a voyage from the Clyde to Havana.
Hope	United Kingdom	The ship was driven ashore and caught fire at Broadstairs, Kent.
Hortensia	Sweden	The ship was driven ashore at Harwich, Essex, United Kingdom. She was on a voyage from Skellefteå to London, United Kingdom.
Maria	United Kingdom	The Yorkshire Billyboy was discovered derelict at sea. She was taken in to Deal, Kent.
Martin Luther	United Kingdom	The ship was driven ashore at Orford, Suffolk. She was on a voyage from London to Hartlepool, County Durham.
Omar Pascha	United States	The steamship foundered in Lake Michigan off Sheboygan, Wisconsin.
Thomas Edward	United Kingdom	The schooner was driven ashore at Orford Haven, Suffolk. She was refloated on 6 November and taken in to Aldeburgh, Suffolk.
Washington	United States	The steamship foundered in Lake Michigan off Sheboyagn.

== 5 November ==
List of shipwrecks: 5 November 1855
Ship	State	Description
Cristina and Maria	Denmark	The schooner was run down by the barque Dumfries (United Kingdom) and sank in the North Sea off Whitby, Yorkshire, United Kingdom. She was on a voyage from Hamburg to Newcastle upon Tyne, Northumberland, United Kingdom.
Credo	United Kingdom	The ship ran aground on the White Island Reef, in the Saint Lawrence River. She was on a voyage from Aberystwyth, Cardiganshire to Quebec City, Province of Canada, British North America. She was refloated and beached at Saint-André-d'Argenteuil, Province of Canada.
Evans	United Kingdom	The ship was driven ashore and wrecked at the Heugh Lighthouse, County Durham. Her crew were rescued.
Petrel	French Navy	The aviso was wrecked at Christiansand, Norway. Her crew survived.
Pink	United Kingdom	The sloop sank in the River Dee at Flint. Her crew were ashore. She was refloated and beached at Aston, Flintshire.
Ripon	United Kingdom	The paddle steamer ran aground at Southampton, Hampshire. She was on a voyage from the Crimea to Southampton. She was later refloated and taken in to Southampton.
Union	United Kingdom	The sloop ran aground on the Holm Sand, in the North Sea off the coast of Suffolk. Her crew were rescued by a yawl. She had broken up by 8 November.

== 6 November ==
List of shipwrecks: 6 November 1855
Ship	State	Description
Centaur	France	The ship struck the Whitby Rock and was damaged. She was taken n to Whitby, Yorkshire, United Kingdom.
Christiana Marien	Denmark	The schooner collided with Dumfries (United Kingdom) and sank in the North Sea off Flamborough Head, Yorkshire, United Kingdom. Her crew were rescued by Dumfries.
Margaret and Ann	United Kingdom	The ship was driven ashore on the coast of Cumberland. She was refloated on 12 November.
Rokeby	United Kingdom	The brig ran aground near Whitburn, County Durham. She was on a voyage from the Nieuw Diep to the River Tyne. She was refloated on 14 November and taken in to Sunderland, County Durham.
Thomas Carter	United Kingdom	The Yorkshire Billyboy collided with the brig Pollack (Norway) and sank in the North Sea. Her crew were rescued by Pollack. Thomas Carter was on a voyage from London to Sunderland, County Durham.

== 7 November ==
List of shipwrecks: 7 November 1855
Ship	State	Description
Alnwick Packet	United Kingdom	The ship was driven ashore and severely damaged at Blyth, Northumberland. She was on a voyage from London to Blyth. She was refloated on 11 November and taken in to Blyth.
Arnold	Stralsund	The schooner collided with the brig Caroline ( Greifswald). She was abandoned the next day off Skagen, Denmark. Her crew were rescued.
Eliza	United Kingdom	The brig was driven ashore and wrecked at Siciliana Point, Sicily. Her crew were rescued. She was on a voyage from Naples, Kingdom of the Two Sicilies to Agrigento, Sicily and London.
Friendship	United Kingdom	The sloop was run down and sunk in the North Sea off the coast of County Durham by a schooner. Her crew took to a boat; they were rescued on 9 November by Zealous (United Kingdom). Friendship was on a voyage from Stockton-on-Tees to South Shields.
Lima	United Kingdom	The ship was wrecked at Main-à-Dieu, Nova Scotia, British North America. She was on a voyage from Liverpool, Lancashire to Quebec City, Province of Canada, British North America.
Reliance	United Kingdom	The ship was driven ashore at Harwich, Essex. She was on a voyage from Harwich to Newcastle upon Tyne, Northumberland. She was refloated the next day and resumed her voyage.
William and Sarah	United Kingdom	The brigantine was wrecked at Netherbane Head, Dumfriesshire with the loss of two of the six people on board. She was on a voyage from Maryport, Cumberland to Belfast, County Antrim.

== 8 November ==
List of shipwrecks: 8 November 1855
Ship	State	Description
Earl Grey	United Kingdom	The ship ran aground on the Cromer Knoll, in the North Sea off the coast of Norfolk. She was on a voyage from Great Yarmouth, Norfolk to Newcastle upon Tyne, Northumberland.
Finlay	(United Kingdom of Great Britain and Ireland) British North America	The steamship suffered a boiler explosion of Port Stanley, Province of Canada and sank with the loss of eight of the 23 people on board.
Maria Luiza	Spain	The barque ran aground on the Brake Sand, in the Thames Estuary. She was on a voyage from London to Cardiff, Glamorgan, United Kingdom. She was refloated and towed into The Downs in a leaky condition and was subsequently taken in to Ramsgate, Kent, United Kingdom.
Rosina	United Kingdom	The ship was driven ashore and capsized in the Solway Firth. She was on a voyage from Liverpool, Lancashire to Carlisle, Cumberland. She was refloated on 10 November.
Tally Ho!	United Kingdom	The schooner ran aground on the Lady Bouch Sand, in the Bristol Channel. She was on a voyage from Chepston, Monmouthshire to Greenock, Renfrewshire. She was refloated and beached.

== 9 November ==
List of shipwrecks: 9 November 1855
Ship	State	Description
Caledonia	United Kingdom	The barque ran aground and was wrecked off Point Ferrolle, Newfoundland. She was on a voyage from Dalhousie, New Brunswick, British North America to Queenstown, County Cork.
David Brown	(United Kingdom of Great Britain and Ireland) British North America	The full-rigged ship was abandoned in the Atlantic Ocean. She was on a voyage from Quebec City, Province of Canada to Bristol, Gloucestershire.
Druid	United Kingdom	The ship collided with Robert Parker (United Kingdom in the Atlantic Ocean and was abandoned with the loss of two of her crew. Survivors were rescued by Robert Parker. Druid was on a voyage from Quebec City] to Bristol, Gloucestershire.
Germania	Belgium	The ship was driven ashore on the coast of County Durham, United Kingdom. She floated off and ran aground on the Herd Sand. She was refloated.
Norman	United Kingdom	The ship ran aground at Poole, Dorset. She was on a voyage from Poole to Fleetwood, Lancashire. She was refloated and put back to Poole in a leaky condition.
Prince Albert Edward	United Kingdom	The ship was wrecked near "Cape Carabourneu". She was on a voyage from the Crimea to Constantinople, Ottoman Empire.

== 10 November ==
List of shipwrecks: 10 November 1855
Ship	State	Description
Adelheid	Kingdom of Hanover	The schooner was wrecked on "Neko Island", Denmark. Her crew were rescued. She was on a voyage from Königsberg, Prussia to an English port.
Dart	United Kingdom	The schooner was driven ashore near Cresswell, Northumberland. She was on a voyage from Hamburg to Sunderland, County Durham. She was refloated and completed her voyage.
Ellen	United Kingdom	The sloop was driven ashore at Cairnbulg, Aberdeenshire. She was on a voyage from Inverness to Hull, Yorkshire. She was refloated on 13 November and taken in to Fraserburgh, Aberdeenshire.
Flying Arrow	United States	The medium clipper ran aground off New Year Island, Tasmania and was abandoned by all but four of her crew. She was on a voyage from Melbourne, Victoria to Batavia, Netherlands East Indies. The remaining crew were subsequently rescued. She was refloated with assistance from the steamship Marion ( (United Kingdom of Great Britain and Ireland) Victoria and HMS Fantome (Royal Navy) and towed in to Melbourne. Subsequently sold, repaired and returned to service.
Neptune, and Unity	United Kingdom	The steamship Neptune was in collision with the sloop Unity and ran aground on the Herd Sand, in the North Sea off the coast of County Durham. She was later refloated and resumed her voyage. Unity was on a voyage from London to South Shields, County Durham. She was beached.
Ralph Waller	United Kingdom	The ship was sighted in the South Atlantic whilst on a voyage from the Chincha Islands, Peru to Aberystwyth, Cardiganshire. No further trace, presumed foundered with the loss of all hands.
Two Brothers	United Kingdom	The sloop was driven ashore at Burnham Overy Staithe, Norfolk. She was on a voyage from Goole, Yorkshire to Lowestoft, Suffolk. She was refloated and take in to Burnham Overy Staithe.

== 11 November ==
List of shipwrecks: 11 November 1855
Ship	State	Description
August and Julius	United Kingdom	The ship departed from Lagos for London. No further trace, presumed foundered with the loss of all hands.
Effort	United Kingdom	The ship ran aground on the Newcombe Sand, in the North Sea off the coast of Suffolk. She was refloated on 13 November and taken in to Lowestoft, Suffolk.
Ellen	United Kingdom	The schooner ran aground on the Barber Sand, in the North Sea off the coast of Suffolk. She was on a voyage from Middlesbrough, Yorkshire to Dunkerque, Nord, France. She was refloated.
Isabella	United States	The barque was driven ashore and wrecked near Cape Spartel, Morocco. Her thirteen crew were rescued. She was on a voyage from Smyrna, Ottoman Empire to Boston, Massachusetts.
Kron Prinds Oscar	Norway	The ship ran aground on Sandhammaren, in the Baltic Sea. She was on a voyage from Härnösand to London, United Kingdom.
Lord John Russell	United Kingdom	The ship was driven ashore and wrecked at Lavernack Point, Cornwall. She was on a voyage from Cardiff, Glamorgan to Cádiz, Spain.
Peterel	United Kingdom	The schooner was in collision with the brig Brothers (United Kingdom) and capsized in the Irish Sea off Point Lynas, Anglesey. Her crew were rescued by Brothers. Peterel was on a voyage from Drogheda, County Louth to Preston, Lancashire. She was towed in to Douglas, Isle of Man on 14 November.
Robert	Hamburg	The ship was driven ashore and wrecked at Cape Spartel. Her crew were rescued. She was on a voyage from Trieste to Hamburg.
Royal William	United Kingdom	The schooner struck the breakwater at Holyhead, Anglesey and sank. Her crew were rescued. Her crew were rescued. She was on a voyage from Dublin to Liverpool, Lancashire. Royal William was refloated on 16 November and beached.

== 12 November ==
List of shipwrecks: 12 November 1855
Ship	State	Description
Content	United Kingdom	The ship was driven ashore near Flamborough Head, Yorkshire. She was on a voyage from London to South Shields, County Durham. She was refloated the next day and resumed her voyage.
Duke of Wellington	United Kingdom	On a voyage from London to Calcutta, the full-rigged ship began leaking one month out, in mid-August 1855; the flow gradually increased until the crew and passengers were forced to take to the three boats, abandoning her, sinking, on 12 December in the Bay of Bengal. All the crew and the three passengers were eventually picked up.
Gem	United Kingdom	The ship was driven ashore and reported to have been severely damaged between Bridlington and Flamborough Head. She was on a voyage from London to Seaham, County Durham. She was refloated and resumed her voyage.
Margaret and Ann	United Kingdom	The ship ran aground on the Scroby Sands, Norfolk. She was refloated the next day and resumed her voyage.
North Pole	United Kingdom	The brig was driven onto the Boulmer Rocks, on the coast of Northumberland. She was on a voyage from Bremen to Newcastle upon Tyne, Northumberland.
Pet	United Kingdom	The brig was in collision with the barque Zollverein (Norway) and foundered in the North Sea off Flamborough Head, Yorkshire with the loss of a crew member. Pet was on a voyage from Seaham to London.
True Blue	United Kingdom	The schooner was in collision with the barque Caliban (United States) and foundered off the Newarp Lightship ( Trinity House). Her crew were rescued by Caliban.
Waterwitch	United Kingdom	The ship was driven ashore and severely damaged at Bridlington. She was on a voyage from Ghent, East Flanders, Belgium to Sunderland, County Durham. She was refloated and resumed her voyage.

== 13 November ==
List of shipwrecks: 13 November 1855
Ship	State	Description
Captain	United Kingdom	The ship struck a sunken rock and foundered in the Indian Ocean. Her crew survived.
Dora	United Kingdom	The ship ran aground on the Holm Sand, in the North Sea off the coast of Suffolk. She was refloated and resumed her voyage.

== 14 November ==
List of shipwrecks: 14 November 1855
Ship	State	Description
Alma	(United Kingdom of Great Britain and Ireland) Burma	The schooner was struck by lightning and exploaded at Malacca City with the loss of eleven lives.
Glide	United Kingdom	The schooner was run down and sunk in Liverpool Bay off the North West Lightship ( Trinity House) by the steamship Despatch (United Kingdom). Her crew were rescued. Glide was on a voyage from Amlwch, Anglesey to Liverpool, Lancashire. Glide was refloated on 23 November and beached at New Brighton, Cheshire. She was refloated the next day and take in to Liverpool.
James Martin	United Kingdom	The ship ran aground on the Skullmartin Rocks. She was refloated and taken in to Ballywater, County Down in a severely damaged condition.
Lydford	United Kingdom	The ship was damaged by fire in the West India Docks, London. Arson was suspected.
Naiad	United Kingdom	The schooner struck the Pearl Rock, in the Strait of Gibraltar. She was on a voyage from Cephalonia, United States of the Ionian Islands to London. She put in to Gibraltar in a leaky condition.

== 15 November ==
List of shipwrecks: 15 November 1855
Ship	State	Description
Cintra	United Kingdom	The steamship ran aground in the River Mersey whilst avoiding a collision with another steamship.
Dundonald	United Kingdom	The ship was damaged by fire at the East India Docks, London.
Eliza Hall	United Kingdom	The ship was driven ashore on the Abertay Sands, Forfarshire. She was on a voyage from Memel, Prussia to Arbroath, Forfarshire. She was refloated on 19 November and towed in to Broughty Ferry in a leaky condition.
Georgina	United Kingdom	The schooner was wrecked on the Gaa Sand, in the North Sea off the mouth of the River Tay with the loss of all hands. She was on a voyage from Quebec City, Province of Canada, British North America to Dundee, Forfarshire.
Harmony	United Kingdom	The brig was driven ashore at Höganäs, Sweden. She was refloated the next day.
Iodine	United Kingdom	The ship foundered in the North Sea off Dimlington, Yorkshire. Her crew were rescued by Earl Grey (United Kingdom). Iodine was on a voyage from South Shields, County Durham to London.
Jason	United Kingdom	The steamship ran aground off "Principos Island", Ottoman Empire. She was on a voyage from Izmit to Constantinople. She was refloated and completed her voyage.
Sarah Maria	United Kingdom	The ship ran aground off Hankin Point, Pembrokeshire. She was on a voyage from Agrigento, Sicily to Newcastle upon Tyne, Northumberland. She was refloated and put into the Belfast Lough in a leaky condition. Subsequently taken in to Belfast, County Antrim for repairs.
Therese	United Kingdom	The barque was run into by the steamship Borussia (Flag unknown) and sank in the Humber.

== 16 November ==
List of shipwrecks: 16 November 1855
Ship	State	Description
Duchess of Kent	United Kingdom	The paddle steamer ran aground on the Burbo Bank, in Liverpool Bay. She was on a voyage from Dublin to Liverpool, Lancashire. She was refloated the next day.
Maid of Lorn	United Kingdom	The paddle steamer ran aground in the Clyde at Greenock, Renfrewshire and partially sank. She was refloated the next day.
Presto	United Kingdom	The ship was driven ashore on Langlade Island. Her crew were rescued. She was on a voyage from Quebec City, Province of Canada, British North America to Liverpool.
Sir Charles Napier	United Kingdom	The ship was beached on Watling's Island, Bahamas. She was on a voyage from St. Jago de Cuba, Cuba to Swansea, Glamorgan.
Sir Robert Preston	United Kingdom	The ship was driven ashore near Staithes, Yorkshire. She was on a voyage from Perth to London. She was refloated on 18 November and taken in to Whitby, Yorkshire in a leaky condition.

== 17 November ==
List of shipwrecks: 17 November 1855
Ship	State	Description
Dolphin	United Kingdom	The paddle steamer sprang a leak and foundered in the Irish Sea 5 nautical miles (9.3 km) north north west of the Fanad Head Lighthouse, County Londonderry. Her crew were rescued. She was on a voyage from Sligo to Irvine, Ayrshire.
Jean Jacques	France	The lugger foundered in the English Channel. Her crew were rescued.
Virginie	United Kingdom	The ship departed from Rio de Janeiro, Brazil for Syra, Greece and Constantinople, Ottoman Empire. No further trace, presumed foundered with the loss of all hands.

== 18 November ==
List of shipwrecks: 18 November 1855
Ship	State	Description
André and Camille	France	The schooner was sunk by a waterspout at Tunis, Beylik of Tunis.
Angiolina	United Kingdom	The schooner was sunk by a waterspout at Tunis.
Cavello Marino	United Kingdom	The brig was sunk by a waterspout at Tunis with the loss of three of her crew.
Evangile	France	The brig was severely damaged by a waterspout at Tunis.
Leucadie	France	The schooner was sunk by a waterspout at Tunis.
Margarethe	Prussia	The schooner was driven ashore at Nexø, Denmark. Her crew were rescued. She was on a voyage from Königsberg to London, United Kingdom.
Martino	Kingdom of Sardinia	The schooner was sunk by a waterspout at Tunis.
Peter Foulkes	United Kingdom	The schooner was in collision with the schooner Petrel (United Kingdom) and sank in the Irish Sea with the loss of all hands. She was on a voyage from Liverpool, Lancashire to Tampico, Mexico.
Underwriter	United Kingdom	The ship ran aground in New York Bay. She was on a voyage from New York, United States to Liverpool. She was refloated and resumed her voyage.

== 19 November ==
List of shipwrecks: 19 November 1855
Ship	State	Description
Energy	United Kingdom	The schooner was driven ashore near Larne, County Antrim. She was on a voyage from Ballina, County Mayo to Liverpool, Lancashire.
Pallion Hall	United Kingdom	The brig sprang a leak and was beached west of Grimsby, Lincolnshire. She was on a voyage from Sunderland, County Durham to London.

== 20 November ==
List of shipwrecks: 20 November 1855
Ship	State	Description
Henry	United Kingdom	The ship was driven ashore at Jurby Point, Isle of Man. She was on a voyage from Troon, Ayrshire to Liverpool, Lancashire.
Lavinia Adams	United Kingdom	The ship ran aground on Love Key. She was on a voyage from Liverpool to New Orleans, Louisiana, United States. She was refloated and taken in to Key West, Florida, United States for repairs.
Mary C. Fitzroy	United Kingdom	The ship sank in the North Sea off Saltfleet, Lincolnshire. Her crew were rescued. She was on a voyage from South Shields, County Durham to London.
Melody	United Kingdom	The barque was damaged by fire in the River Thames.

== 21 November ==
List of shipwrecks: 21 November 1855
Ship	State	Description
Isabella	United Kingdom	The ship ran aground on the Sizewell Bank, in the North Sea off the coast of Suffolk. She was on a voyage from Hartlepool, County Durham to London. She was refloated and put in to the River Colne for repairs.
Maagen	Denmark	The ship was wrecked on the Lemon Sand. She was on a voyage from Copenhagen to Harwich, Essex, United Kingdom.
William	United Kingdom	The schooner was driven ashore at North Sunderland, County Durham. She was refloated and towed in to Berwick upon Tweed, Northumberland for repairs.

== 22 November ==
List of shipwrecks: 22 November 1855
Ship	State	Description
Columbus	United Kingdom	The ship was departed from Rio de Janeiro, Brazil for Falmouth, Cornwall. No further trace, presumed foundered with the loss of all hands.
Paea	Denmark	The brigantine ran aground on the Holme Sand, in the North Sea off the coast of Suffolk, United Kingdom. She was on a voyage from London to Newcastle upon Tyne, United Kingdom. She was refloated.
Watson	United Kingdom	The ship was wrecked in St. Peter's Bay, Nova Scotia, British North America. She was on a voyage from Quebec City, Province of Canada, British North America to the River Tyne.

== 23 November ==
List of shipwrecks: 23 November 1855
Ship	State	Description
Express	United Kingdom	The ship struck the quayside at Ramsgate, Kent and was damaged. She was on a voyage from South Shields, County Durham to Ramsgate.

== 24 November ==
List of shipwrecks: 24 November 1855
Ship	State	Description
Gazelle	United Kingdom	The schooner struck a submerged object and sank in Jack Sound. Her crew were rescued. She was on a voyage from Cardiff, Glamorgan to Liverpool, Lancashire.
John Romilly	United Kingdom	The ship was driven ashore in the Dardanelles. She was later refloated.
Leven	United Kingdom	The sloop was run into and sunk at Fleetwood, Lancashire by the steamship Dunaskin (United Kingdom). She was refloated and beached for repairs.
Margaret Roberts	United Kingdom	The ship was wrecked at Great Yarmouth, Norfolk with the loss of three lives. She was on a voyage from Cardiff to South Shields, County Durham.

== 25 November ==
List of shipwrecks: 25 November 1855
Ship	State	Description
Alexander, and Glory	United Kingdom	The brig Alexander collided with the schooner Glory at Hartlepool, County Durham. Both vessels were severely damaged.
Brilliant	(United Kingdom of Great Britain and Ireland) Guernsey	The ship ran aground at South Shields, County Durham and was consequently beached at East Hartlepool.
Concordia	United Kingdom	The ship ran aground on Key Vaccos and caught fire. She was on a voyage from Mobile, Alabama to Liverpool, Lancashire.
Dove	United Kingdom	The derelict brig foundered in the North Sea off Scarborough, Yorkshire.
Edgar	United Kingdom	The ship was in collision with Langothland (United Kingdom). She was on a voyage from Rochester, Kent to South Shields. She put in to Bridlington, Yorkshire, where she ran aground.
Frederick Franz	Grand Duchy of Mecklenburg-Schwerin	The barque ran aground on the Ridge Sand, in the North Sea off the coast of Essex, United Kingdom. She was on a voyage from Newcastle upon Tyne, Northumberland, United Kingdom to Constantinople, Ottoman Empire. She was refloated and towed in to Harwich, Essex.
Pleiades	United Kingdom	The brig ran aground at South Shields. She was on a voyage from South Shields to London. She was refloated and put in to Hartlepool in a severely damaged condition.
Robert	United Kingdom	The brig was wrecked on the Tongue Sand, off the coast of Kent with the loss of four of the twelve people on board. Survivors were rescued by the luggers Ocean and Secret (both United Kingdom). Robert was on a voyage from Cardiff, Glamorgan to London.

== 26 November ==
List of shipwrecks: 26 November 1855
Ship	State	Description
Commerce	United Kingdom	The ship was abandoned in the Mediterranean Sea and subsequently foundered. Her crew were rescued by Petrel (United Kingdom). Commerce was on a voyage from Syra, Greece to an English port.
Marie-Roche-Bernard	France	The brig ran aground on the Goodwin Sands, Kent, United Kingdom and was wrecked with the loss of a crew member. Survivors were rescued by the lifeboat Northumberland (United Kingdom). Marie-Roche-Bernard was on a voyage from Hartlepool, County Durham, United Kingdom to Bordeaux, Gironde.
Messenger	(United Kingdom of Great Britain and Ireland) British North America	The ship was abandoned in the Atlantic Ocean. Her crew were rescued by Alliance (United Kingdom). Messenger was on a voyage from the Clyde to Boston, Massachusetts, United States.
Psyche	United Kingdom	The ship ran aground on the Tongue Sand, in the Thames Estuary. She was on a voyage from London to Moulmein, British Burma. She was refloated the next day and put in to Southampton, Hampshire.

== 27 November ==
List of shipwrecks: 27 November 1855
Ship	State	Description
Resolution	Norway	The brig ran aground at Eyemouth, Berwickshire, United Kingdom.
Templar	United Kingdom	The barque was lost at Maranhão, Brazil. Her crew were rescued. she was on a voyage from Cardiff, Glamorgan to Maranhão.
William Gurney	United Kingdom	The ship ran aground on the Barber Sand, in the North Sea off the coast of Suffolk. She was on a voyage from Sunderland, County Durham to Lowestoft, Suffolk. She was refloated with assistance from a tug and beached at Lowestoft.

== 28 November ==
List of shipwrecks: 28 November 1855
Ship	State	Description
Albion	United Kingdom	The steamship ran aground in The Cumbraes, Ayrshire. All on board were rescued. She was on a voyage from Glasgow, Renfrewshire to Stranraer, Wigtownshire. She was refloated the next day.
Floriatia	United Kingdom	The ship sprang a leak in the Atlantic Ocean (48°21′N 35°56′W) and became waterlogged. Her eighteen crew were rescued on 4 December by the barque Gentoo (United Kingdom). Floriatia was on a voyage from Dalhousie, New Brunswick, British North America to Falmouth, Cornwall.
Harmony	United Kingdom	The brig foundered in the Bay of Biscay. Her crew were rescued by a Spanish lugger. She was on a voyage from San Sebastián, Spain to Rouen, Seine-Inférieure, France.

== 29 November ==
List of shipwrecks: 29 November 1855
Ship	State	Description
Arrow	United Kingdom	The steamship was abandoned in the Atlantic Ocean. Her crew were rescued by Frolic (United Kingdom). Arrow was on a voyage from Queenstown, County Cork to Buenos Aires, Argentina.
Egedes Minde	Denmark	The brig was driven ashore on the coast of Lincolnshire, United Kingdom. She was on a voyage from London to Hartlepool, County Durham, United Kingdom. She was refloated on 14 December and towed in to Grimsby, Lincolnshire.

== 30 November ==
List of shipwrecks: 30 November 1855
Ship	State	Description
Echo	Netherlands	The barque collided with the barque Camelion (Netherlands) and sank in the Irish Sea off Bardsey Island, Caernarfonshire, United Kingdom with the loss of five of her thirteen crew. Survivors were rescued by Camelion. Echo was on a voyage from Amsterdam, North Holland to Liverpool, Lancashire, United Kingdom.
Flying Fish	(United Kingdom of Great Britain and Ireland) Jersey	The schooner was run down and sunk in the English Channel 24 nautical miles (44 km) off Start Point, Devon by the barque Aerolite (United Kingdom). All on board were rescued by Aerolite. Flying Fish was on a voyage from São Miguel Island, Azores to Hull, Yorkshire.
Isabella	United Kingdom	The ship ran aground and sank in the Goeree Gat, off the coast of Zeeland, Netherlands. Her crew survived. She was on a voyage from Newcastle upon Tyne, Northumberland to Schiedam, South Holland, Netherlands.
James	United Kingdom	The ship was abandoned in the Atlantic Ocean. her crew were rescued. She was on a voyage from Quebec City, Province of Canada, British North America to St. Ives, Cornwall.
Melance	France	The brig was wrecked on the coast of Nova Scotia, British North America. She was on a voyage from Martinique to Newfoundland, British North America.
Rover	United Kingdom	The smack was driven ashore and wrecked south of Scarborough, Yorkshire with the loss of her captain.

== Unknown date ==
List of shipwrecks: Unknown date in November 1855
Ship	State	Description
Baron Holsberg	Duchy of Holstein	The barque was abandoned in the North Sea before 5 November.
Burtemente	United Kingdom	The ship sank off the coast of China before 15 November.
Dale Park	United Kingdom	The barque was abandoned in the Atlantic Ocean south west of the Isles of Scilly before 26 November.
Energy	United Kingdom	The schooner was driven ashore in the Dardanelles before 29 November.
Fredericke	United Kingdom	The ship ran aground on the Droogden Bank, in the Baltic Sea. She was on a voyage from Newcastle upon Tyne, Northumberland to Ystad, Sweden. She was refloated on 5 November.
George Foster	Prussia	The ship was wrecked on the Goodwin Sands, Kent, United Kingdom. Her crew were rescued by the lifeboat Northumberland (United Kingdom).
James Redden	United Kingdom	The ship ran aground on the Beaumont Shoal, in the Saint Lawrence River between 5 and 8 November. She was on a voyage from Quebec City, Province of Canada, British North America to Carlisle, Cumberland. She was refloated and put back to Quebec City.
Julia Setubalense	(United Kingdom of Great Britain and Ireland) British North America	The ship was abandoned in the Atlantic Ocean between 23 and 25 November. She was on a voyage from Madeira to New York, United States.
Junior	United Kingdom	The ship was driven ashore and wrecked east of Louisberg, Nova Scotia, British North America before 5 November. Her crew were rescued. She was on a voyage from Trapani, Sicily to Quebec City.
Leopoldine	Flag unknown	The ship ran aground on the Goodwin Sands. Her crew were rescued by the lifeboat Northumberland (United Kingdom).
Peruvian	United Kingdom	The ship was driven ashore on Egg Island before 12 November. She was on a voyage from Liverpool, Lancashire to Quebec City.
Sarantes	United Kingdom	The ship was wrecked in the Bahamas. She was on a voyage from Liverpool to Havana, Cuba.
Sardinia	Royal Sardinian Navy	The steamship foundered in the Black Sea with the loss of all on board. She was on a voyage from Balaklava, Russia to Constantinople, Ottoman Empire.
Speculation	United Kingdom	The brig was abandoned in the North Sea before 19 November.
Swift	United Kingdom	The schooner ran aground on the Foreness Rock, Margate, Kent. She was refloated.
Tally-ho	United Kingdom	The ship was driven ashore on "Lady-beach" before 9 November. She was refloated and taken in to the Swash in a sinking condition.
Tartar	United Kingdom	The ship ran aground on the Goodwin Sands. Her crew were rescued by the lifeboat Northumberland (United Kingdom).
Thomas	United Kingdom	The ship was abandoned in the North Sea. Her three crew were rescued by Pollux (United Kingdom). Thomas was towed in to South Shields, County Durham on 7 November in a derelict condition.
Vrouw Martha	Netherlands	The ship was abandoned at sea before 14 November. She was on a voyage from Gothenburg, Sweden to London, United Kingdom.
Zabina	United Kingdom	The schooner ran aground on the Stoney Binks, in the North Sea off the mouth of the Humber. She was on a voyage from Sunderland to Dunkerque, Nord, France. She was refloated on 19 November with assistance from the Spurn Lightship ( Trinity House) or the Sprun Lifeboat, which lost two of her crew whilst assisting.
