= Dingle Marshes =

English nature reserve

Coordinates: 52.2854°N 1.62929°E

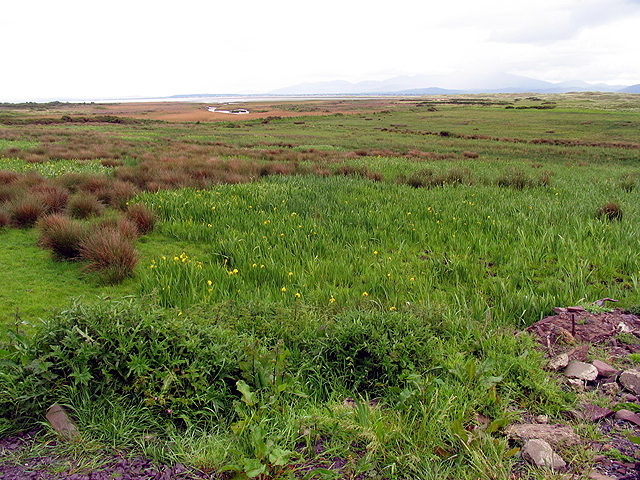
- Interactive map of Dingle Marshes
- Type: Nature reserve
- Location: Dunwich, Suffolk
- OS grid: TM479708
- Area: 93 hectares (230 acres)
- Manager: Suffolk Wildlife Trust

Dingle Marshes is a 93-hectare (230-acre) wildlife reserve on the North Sea coast of the English county of Suffolk. The reserve is located between Dunwich and Walberswick, approximately 4 miles (6.4 km) south-west of Southwold. The marshes make up part of the Suffolk Coast National Nature Reserve along with reserves at Walberswick and Hen Reedbeds. They are owned jointly by the RSPB and Suffolk Wildlife Trust and are managed by these two organisations and Natural England. The site is in the Dunwich Heaths and Marshes Nature Conservation Review site, Grade I, the Minsmere-Walberswick Ramsar internationally important wetland site, the Minsmere to Walberswick Heaths and Marshes Special Area of Conservation, and the Minsmere-Walberswick Special Protection Area under the European Union Directive on the Conservation of Wild Birds.

It is also within the Minsmere-Walberswick Heaths and Marshes Site of Special Scientific Interest and is a Natura 2000 site. It is an internationally important site for the starlet sea anemone as well as a key site for bitterns and marsh harriers within the UK. It was purchased in 1999 at a cost of £1 million, aided by a grant from the Heritage Lottery Fund of £559,000.

== Landscape ==
The marshes form part of the open coastal fen landscape type within Suffolk which is predominantly open with few trees. They were drained for use as cattle grazing at some point before 1587 but have reverted to fen land after mid-20th century reflooding.

== Habitat ==
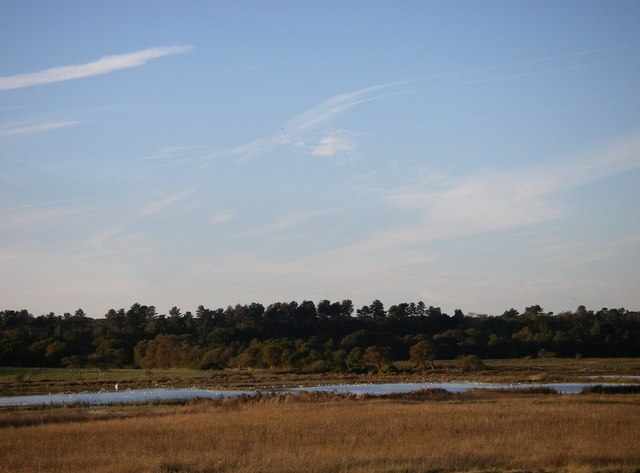
Dingle Marshes looking inland towards Dunwich forest

The marshes include a mixture of coastal and freshwater wetland habitats, including brackish pools. These provide breeding habitats for birds such as bitterns, marsh harriers and bearded tits as well as mammals such as European otters and water vole and over-wintering locations for species such as pied avocets, white-fronted geese, northern lapwings and redshanks. The site is an internationally important habitat of the starlet sea anemone, the rarest sea anemone in Britain. The reserve is bordered by heathland and forest on the landward side and includes a vegetated shingle bank on the seaward side. Little terns often nest along the bank.

== Flooding ==
Coastal flooding has affected the marshes in recent years, including in 2003, 2006 and 2007. The shingle bank was breached in 2006 and 2007 leading to concerns that vulnerable freshwater habitats could be lost, including the breeding grounds of species such as bitterns. Emergency flood defence works were carried out by the Environment Agency following the 2006 breach, and these were extended in 2012 to provide additional flood defences for the reserve.

== Facilities ==
The reserve is accessed from the south at Dunwich beach where a car park and other facilities are maintained by East Suffolk council. A circular walk is waymarked around the marshes. The RSPB maintains a hide overlooking the marsh.
