= Hen Reedbeds =

Nature reserve in Suffolk, England

Coordinates: 52.335°N 1.625°E

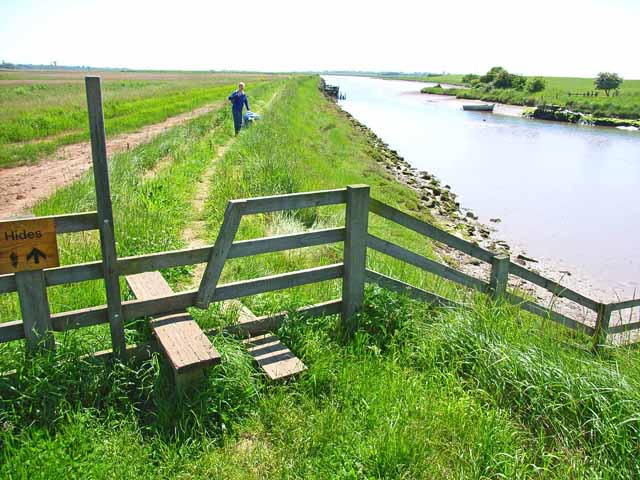
- Interactive map of Hen Reedbeds
- Type: Nature reserve
- Location: Southwold, Suffolk
- OS grid: TM471771
- Area: 55 hectares (140 acres)
- Manager: Suffolk Wildlife Trust

Hen Reedbeds is a 55 hectare nature reserve near the North Sea coast of the English county of Suffolk. The reserve is located in the Blyth valley between Reydon and Blythburgh, approximately 2.5 miles (4.0 km) west of Southwold. The marshes make up part of the Suffolk Coast National Nature Reserve along with reserves at Walberswick and Dingle Marshes.

The reserve is owned by the Suffolk Wildlife Trust and is managed in conjunction with Natural England and the RSPB. It is part of the Minsmere-Walberswick Heaths and Marshes Site of Special Scientific Interest, as well as being a Natura 2000 site, a Ramsar Site and within the Suffolk Coast and Heaths Area of Outstanding Natural Beauty.

The reserve was created in 1999 from an area of degraded grassland adjacent to the A1095 road. It was specifically created to provide a range of freshwater habitats and is an important site for bitterns and marsh harriers within the UK.

== Habitats ==
The reserve is a mix of wetland habitats, including reedbeds, fens, dykes and pools. It was designed to provide a breeding site for bitterns. Other key species seen at the site include marsh harriers, herons, bearded tits, four-spotted chaser dragonflies and hairy dragonflies as well as mammals including otters and water voles. Large roosts of starlings have been common at the reserve during autumn since 2003.

The reserve is seen as an example of the effective management of habitats in the face of coastal erosion and sea level rise along the Suffolk coast.

== Facilities ==
A car park is maintained at the reserve. Way marked trails, some of which are wheelchair accessible, guide visitors around the site with a range of viewing platforms and hides.
