= Happisburgh Lighthouse =

Lighthouse in Norfolk, England

Happisburgh Lighthouse Haisborough
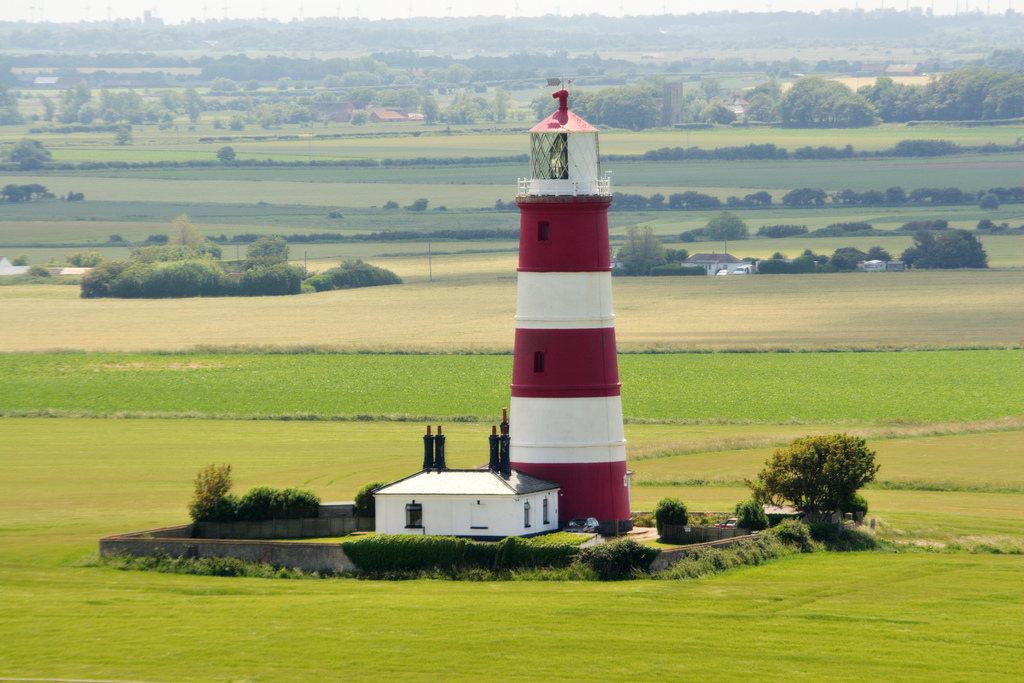
- Happisburgh Lighthouse
- Location: Happisburgh; Norfolk; England
- Coordinates: 52.820479°N 1.536950°E

Tower
- Constructed: 1791
- Construction: Masonry tower
- Automated: 1929
- Height: 26 metres (85 ft)
- Shape: Cylindrical tower with balcony and lantern
- Markings: Tower with red and white bands, white lantern, red lantern roof
- Operator: Friends of Happisburgh Lighthouse
- Heritage: Grade II listed building

Light
- Focal height: 41 metres (135 ft)
- Lens: 1st order catadioptric fixed lens
- Light source: Mains power
- Range: 14 nautical miles (26 km; 16 mi)
- Characteristic: Fl (3) W 30s

Pronounced
(listen)

Happisburgh Lighthouse in Happisburgh on the North Norfolk coast is the only independently operated lighthouse in Great Britain. It is also the oldest working lighthouse in East Anglia. Historically it was also often called Haisborough or Haisbro' Lighthouse (a more phonetic spelling of the name).

== History ==
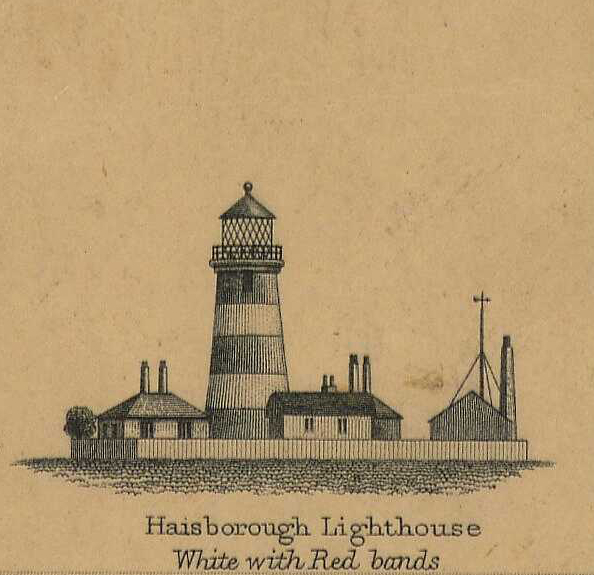
Haisborough Lighthouse in 1888

The building was constructed in 1790 by the Corporation of Trinity House as one of a pair of lights ("High Lighthouse" and "Low Lighthouse") and worked with the Newarp Lightvessel to guide mariners around the southern edge of the offshore Haisborough Sands. The light came from Argand lamps (there were 13 lamps in each lighthouse, each placed in front of a polished reflector).

In 1868 the lantern stage (the top-most part of the tower) was replaced with the then-innovative diagonally-framed glass structure seen today. Following this, the rows of lamps and reflectors were replaced in each lighthouse by a single multi-wick lamp and a large (first-order) catadioptric lens designed by Chance Brothers of Smethwick.

In 1871 Happisburgh's lighthouses were used for a series of trials comparing a Douglass 4-wick oil light (displayed from the low lighthouse) with a Wigham 108-jet gas light (displayed from the high lighthouse) both using the same optics; the experiments (which tested rival claims made by the principal advocates of these forms of illumination, James Nicholas Douglass and John Richardson Wigham respectively) were not conclusive and further trials later took place at South Foreland.

In order to provide a supply of coal gas for the lamp, a small gas works was established alongside the high lighthouse; the gas was manufactured using cannel coal and stored in a pair of gas holders situated behind the lighthouse. In 1872, the trial having concluded, it was decided to retain gas as the illuminant for the high lighthouse. Beyond Happisburgh, however, Trinity House did not adopt gas as an illuminant for its lighthouses.

The low light was decommissioned and demolished in 1884 before it could be lost due to coastal erosion; its lantern and lens were reused at Southwold lighthouse. The demolition of the low light led to the High Light being repainted with red bands, so as to differentiate it more clearly from the lighthouse at Winterton; at the same time it was also provided with an occulting mechanism to differentiate the light itself.

The light source was changed to paraffin in 1904, and then to an unwatched acetylene system in 1929; this meant that there was no further need for keepers to be permanently accommodated on site, and the keepers' cottages were then sold. In 1947 the light was electrified and given a new group flashing characteristic: three flashes every 30 seconds.

The tower is 85 ft (25.9 m) tall, putting the lantern at 134 ft (40.8 m) above sea level. The lighthouse is painted white with three red bands and has a light characteristic of Fl(3)30s (three white flashes, repeated every 30 seconds) at a height of 135 ft (41.1 m) with a range of 14 nautical miles (26 km). It continues to use the optic installed in 1868.

The other lighthouse - the "low light" - was 20 ft (6.1 m) lower. Together they formed a pair of range lights that marked a safe passage around the southern end of the offshore Haisborough Sands 8 miles (12.9 km) to a stretch of safe waters known as 'The Would'.

== Independence ==
Happisburgh Lighthouse Act 1990
- Act of Parliament
- Parliament of the United Kingdom
- Long title: An Act to establish and constitute the Happisburgh Lighthouse Trust; to appoint the Trust to be a local lighthouse authority; to confer on the Trust power to operate and maintain Happisburgh lighthouse in the county of Norfolk; and for connected purposes.
- Citation: 1990 c. xvi

Dates
- Royal assent: 26 April 1990

Text of statute as originally enacted

In 1987 Happisburgh was one of five lighthouses declared redundant by Trinity House and deactivation was planned for June 1988. Villagers organised a petition to oppose the closure, and as a result the date was postponed. Under the Merchant Shipping Act 1894, Trinity House may dispose of a working lighthouse only to an established lighthouse authority. On 25 April 1990 the Happisburgh Lighthouse Act 1990 (c. xvi) received royal assent, establishing the Happisburgh Lighthouse Trust as a local lighthouse authority, and Happisburgh became the only independently run operational lighthouse in Great Britain.

In June 2018, the lighthouse was repainted. At a cost of £20,000, the work took two weeks by a specialist team of four painters. The 300 litres of specially mixed masonry paints used was donated by a paint company. The Friends of Happisburgh Lighthouse said: "The re-paint demonstrates our continuing commitment to maintaining Happisburgh lighthouse for future generations."

Due to COVID-19, the lighthouse did not open to visitors in 2020.

== In popular culture ==
- In 1990, the lighthouse featured in an episode of the BBC TV programme Challenge Anneka. The lighthouse was repainted inside and out in 33 hours on 30–31 August 1990, with the programme airing on 15 December 1990.
- The lighthouse was used as the location for the video of Ellie Goulding's 2010 song "The Writer".

== Gallery ==
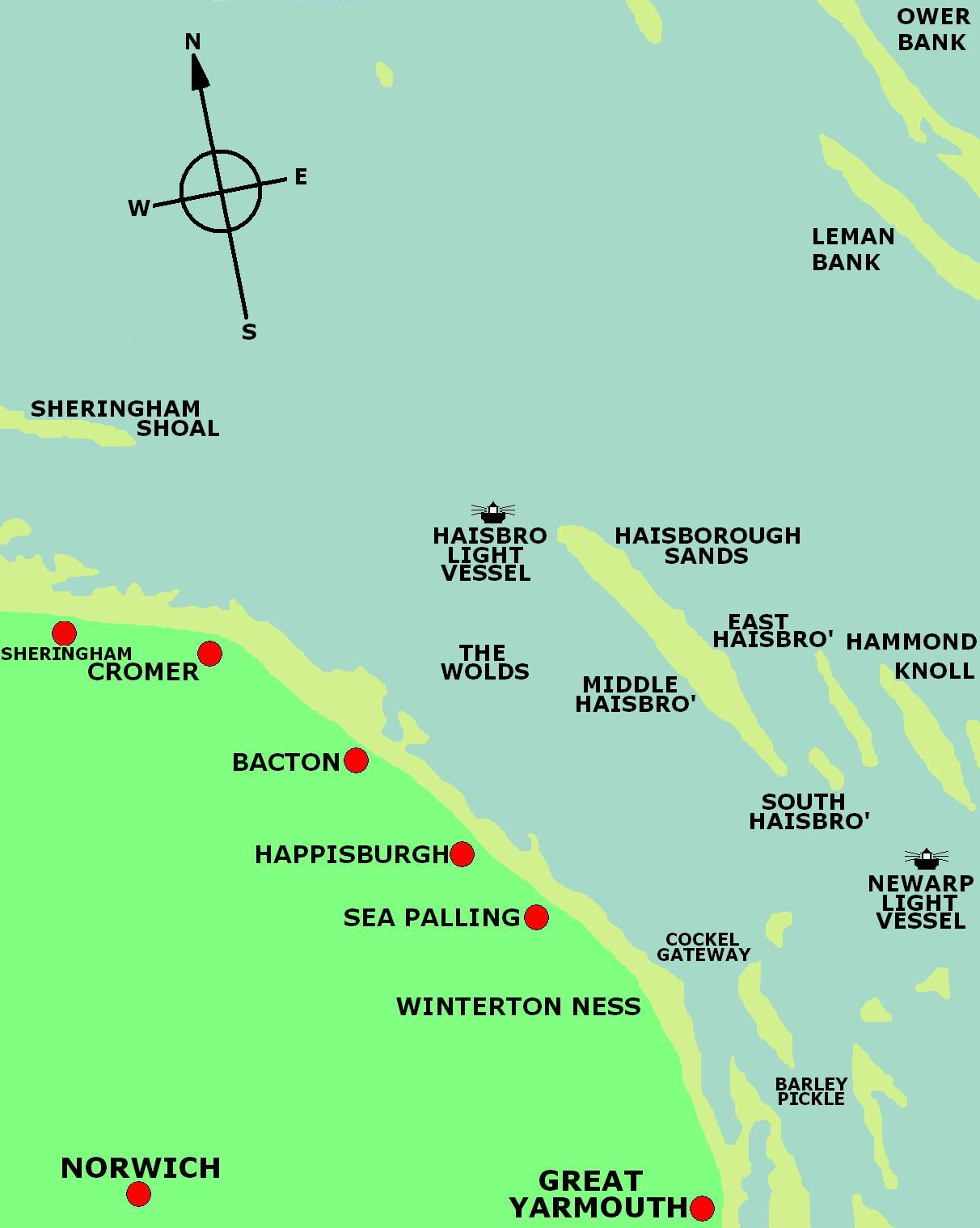
The location of Haisborough Sands off the Norfolk coast

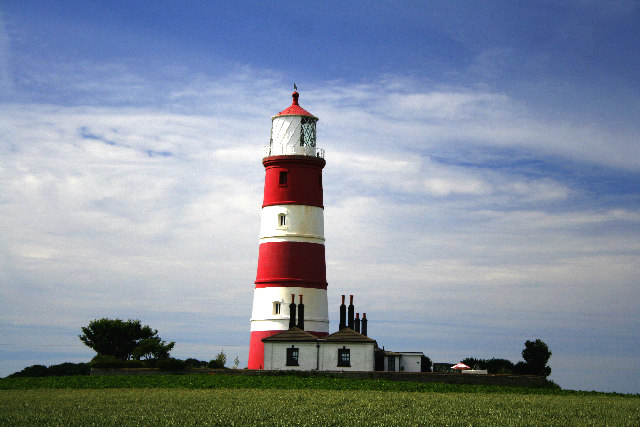
The lighthouse

The lantern inside the lighthouse

== See also ==
- List of lighthouses in England

== Bibliography ==
- Price Edwards, E. (2010). Lighthouse(1884). BiblioBazaar. ISBN 978-1-146-41637-5.
- Golding CBE, Capt. Thomas (1929). Trinity House from Within. private printing.
- Hague, Douglas B.; Christie, Rosemary (1975). Lighthouses - Their Architecture, History and Archaeology. Llandysul : Gomer Press. ISBN 0-85088-324-5.
- Long, Neville (1983). Lights of East Anglia. Terence Dalton Ltd. ISBN 0-86138-029-0.
- Stevenson, D. Alan (1959). The World's Lighthouses Before 1820. Oxford University Press.
