= Winterton Lighthouse =

Lighthouse in Winterton-on-Sea, Norfolk, England

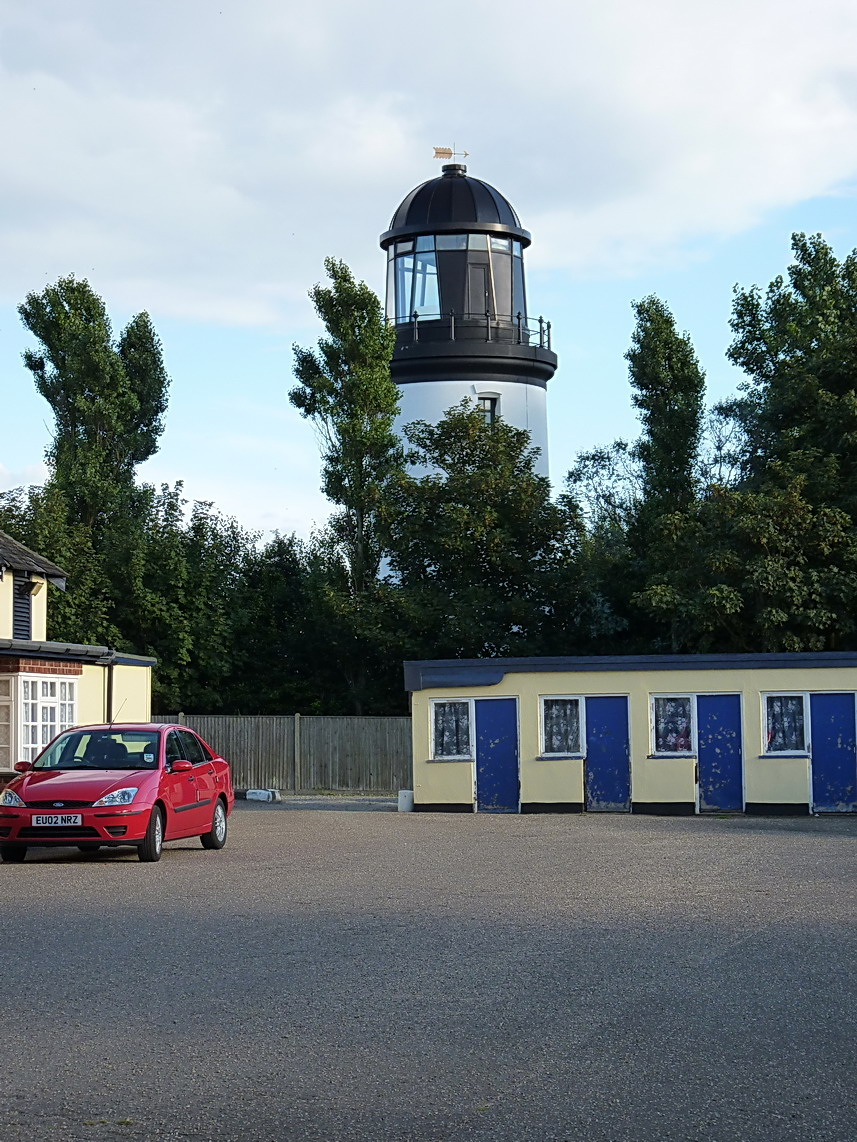
- The lighthouse today with new lantern room
- Location: Winterton-on-Sea; Norfolk; England
- Coordinates: 52.712963°N 1.695273°E

Tower
- Constructed: 1616 (first); 1687 (second)
- Construction: brick tower
- Height: 19 metres (62 ft)
- Shape: cylindrical tower with balcony and lantern
- Markings: white tower, black lantern
- Operator: now a private residence

Light
- First lit: 1868 (current)
- Deactivated: 1921
- Lens: first-order fixed Fresnel lens

Winterton Lighthouse is located in Winterton-on-Sea in the English county of Norfolk. In 1845 Winterton Ness was described as being 'well known to the mariner as the most fatal headland between Scotland and London'. As well as marking the headland, the lighthouse was intended to help guide vessels into the Cockle Gat, which provided the northern entry into the safe water of Yarmouth Roads. The lighthouse was known to Daniel Defoe and is mentioned in his novel Robinson Crusoe.

A lighthouse is known to have stood in this location since the early 17th century; it was initially lit by a coal-burning brazier. Since then it has been rebuilt on a number of occasions. For well over a century there were three smaller lighthouses in the immediate vicinity in addition to the main 'fire light', all of which were concurrently operational. The present lighthouse dates from the mid-1860s; it was decommissioned in 1921.

== History ==
Winterton Lighthouse served to mark the entry point, for vessels approaching from the north, into Yarmouth Roads (a safe roadstead and anchorage for colliers on the Newcastle-to-London trade route, and equally vital to the local Great Yarmouth herring trade). The early history of the lights at Winterton is a complex one involving a long-running dispute, and is the subject of 'contradictory' accounts.

=== Origins ===
Prior to the establishment of a lighthouse, it is thought that a light to guide shipping was displayed from the 15th-century tower of Holy Trinity and All Saints' Church in the village. In 1581 a bill was introduced in the House of Commons for the maintenance of a light on Winterton Steeple 'for the more safety of such ships as pass by that coast'.

In 1616 Sir William Erskine, Knight, and John Meldrum, Esq., petitioned the king for the right to erect a lighthouse at Winterton. At the same time, the Corporation of Trinity House was engaged in separate discussions with the Admiralty about establishing lights in the area, and on 5 March 1617 they instructed a Mr Norreys and a Mr Geere to go to Winterton 'and make lighthouses there'. The following year, however, the priority of Erskine and Meldrum's claim was recognised by the Privy Council and they were granted a lease, entitling them to the exclusive right to place a light or lights anywhere within a two-mile radius of Winterton village and to collect a penny for every ton burden from any ship sailing by or along that part of the coast. In 1618, therefore, Erskine and Meldrum lit their own light at Winterton and promptly ordered the corporation to extinguish theirs. Thenceforward, the corporation (who later claimed to have erected a light at Winterton as early as 1613) engaged in a long series of disputes with Erskine and Meldrum and their successors over rights and fees, in what has been described as 'a muddled, bitter and confusing story which lasted from 1616 to 1685'. In 1637, with Erskine's interest in the scheme having passed to a Gerard Gore of London, Sir John Meldrum (as he now was) successfully petitioned the Privy Council to permit the transfer of his part in the lease likewise to Gore (presumably in exchange for a substantial sum of money). At the same time Meldrum transferred a patent he held to build lights on Orford Ness; henceforward the rights to Winterton and Orford were held together.

=== Other lights at Winterton and Winterton Ness ===
In addition to the main lighthouse, which stood just to the east of the village, Erskine and Meldrum had set up a separate pair of leading lights a mile and three-quarters to the north, on Winterton Ness. These were sometimes known as the 'Thwart lights'.

Furthermore, in 1677, in response to petitions from local sea-traders, Trinity House set up an additional 'small light' east of the village to serve in conjunction with the lighthouse (or 'great light') as a further pair of leading lights. They were awarded a patent for this light the following year (though the other three lights remained in private hands).

The Ness Lights and the Small Light were all initially lit by candles (all three were converted to oil lights by 1746). A chart of c.1690 shows that the Ness Lights were aligned on a SW-NE bearing, to guide vessels safely toward the coast, whereupon the Small Light would align with the Great Light, on a more southerly bearing, to provide a line of approach within the Middlefoote Sands (a shoal which, at the time, lay parallel to the shoreline at Winterton).

=== Later developments ===
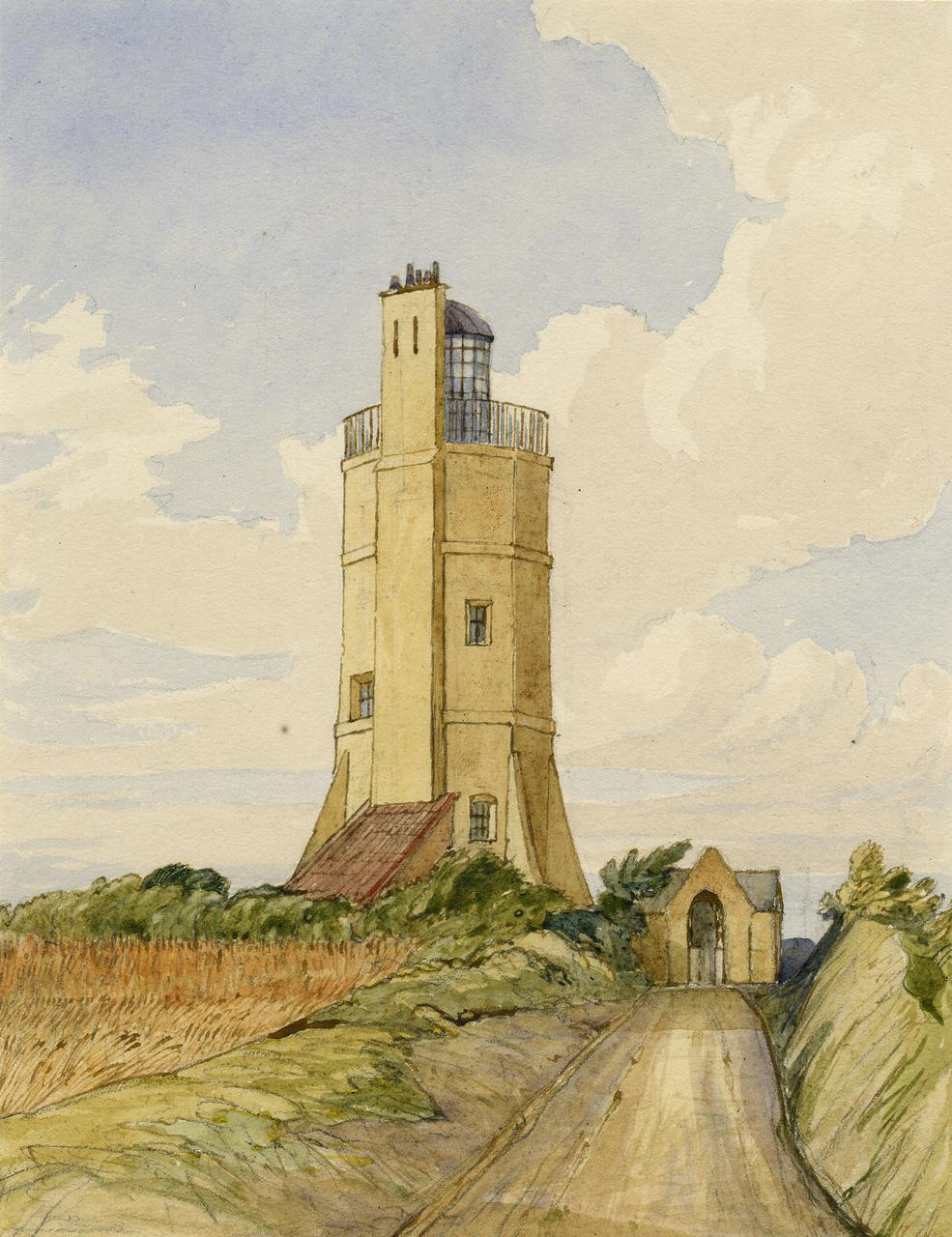
the lighthouse in the 19th century

On Lady Day 1687 the rights to the lease were acquired by Edward Turnour of Orford, son of Sir Edward Turnour, and the afore-named Gore's grandson. Later that year the 'old great-lighthouse' was demolished due to shore erosion and a new tower built further inland (the 'small light' being rebuilt at the same time). Samuel Thornton's chart of 1702-07 shows the 'Fire light' at Winterton and alongside it the 'New light', as well as the two leading lights at Winterton Ness. The patent rights passed to Henry Grey of Billingbear in 1720, and then by descent to the Aldworth-Neville family and the Lords Braybrooke.

According to several sources, the lighthouse was rebuilt in 1790. In November 1791 the brazier was replaced with a fixed array of Argand lamps and reflectors. The lighthouse was described by John Purdy in 1838 as 'a stone tower, on crown-lease, built in 1790. It stands on Winterton Point, is 52 feet in height, and exhibits a brilliant fixed light, which may be seen nearly twenty miles off'.

The Small Light was deemed unnecessary following the establishment of a pair of lighthouses at Happisburgh, some 10 miles (16 km) up the coast, and it was therefore decommissioned on 1 January 1791.

The Ness Lights remained operational in the early nineteenth century, but by this time the surrounding shoals and channels had altered significantly. In 1826 Lieut. William Hewett R.N., who had been engaged by the Lords of the Admiralty to survey the lights on this part of the coast, wrote:

'About one mile and a half to the northward of Winterton lighthouse, there is a slight projection of the land, called Winterton Ness, on which are two small lighthouses nearly east and west of each other, or in a direction nearly perpendicular to the coastline. When they were erected, or for what purpose, I have never been enabled to inform myself of on the coast, nor from my many years' experience in navigating it to discover their use. When brought in one with each other, they lead to no channel, nor to clear any banks, but are lighted up as useless beacons upon the coast, and answer so far, as I can discover no other purpose, than facilitating the loss of vessels […] I have learnt that they are the property of Lord Braybroke, and that his lordship receives £500 per annum for keeping them up'.

The Ness Lights were finally removed in around 1830. In 1836 the lease on the remaining lighthouse was bought out by Trinity House.

In 1840 a pair of 'neat houses' were erected on the cliff as residences for the keepers; according to several sources the tower was rebuilt at the same time. It was described in 1848 as 'on an eminence south-east of the village [...] a lighthouse of late erection, an hexagonal tower seventy feet high, lighted with patent argand lamps and reflectors'. In 1854 the tower was painted red so as to render it more distinctly visible during the day (the adjacent cottages remained painted white).

=== The current lighthouse ===
The lighthouse, circa 1925

James Douglass designed a new lighthouse for Winterton shortly after being appointed Engineer-in-Chief at Trinity House in 1863, and subsequently oversaw its construction. The new tower was cylindrical and (again) coloured red. It was topped by a new 14 ft-diameter cylindrical lantern structure, in which, in 1868, Trinity House installed a large (first-order) fixed optic (engineered by James Chance); it displayed, as previously, a fixed white light.

In 1910 the light characteristic was altered to occulting; thenceforward the light was eclipsed four times every 90 seconds. During World War I, Winterton Lighthouse served as a military lookout post.

==== Decommissioning ====
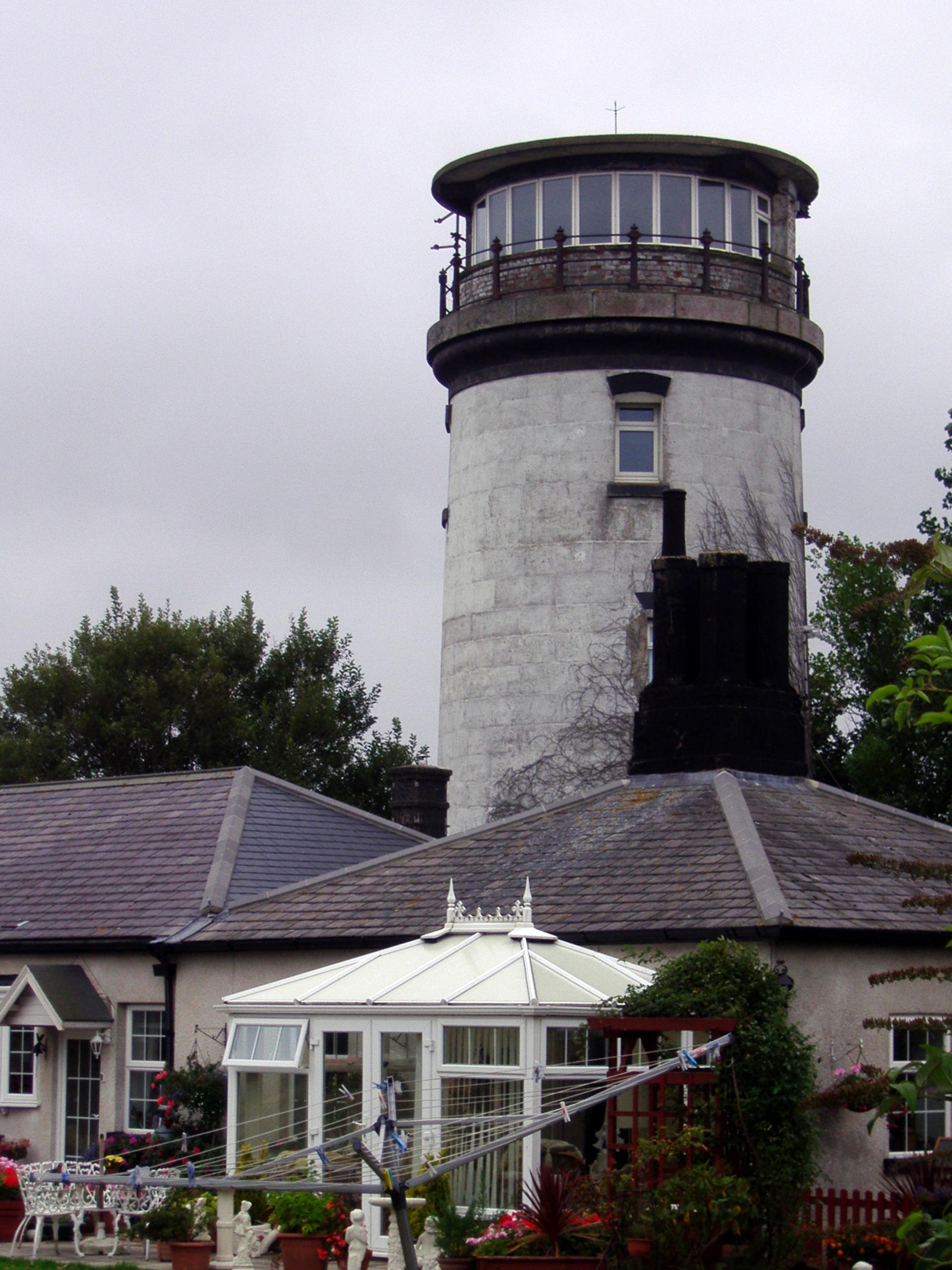
The lighthouse in 2009, with observation room

In 1921, the lighthouse ceased operations. (In lieu of the lighthouse, improvements were made to the light of the Cockle lightvessel). The following year, the lantern having been removed, the lighthouse was sold at auction by Trinity House (along with 5 acres (2.0 ha) of gardens and pasture, and 'some serviceable buildings') for £1,550 to a buyer from London, to serve as a summer residence.

In 1939 the lighthouse was commandeered for use by the military, at which time a circular observation room was built on top of the tower. After the end of the war, the buildings were again used as a private residence until 1965, when they were sold to the proprietors of the adjoining holiday park.

== Present day ==
In 2012 the observation deck was replaced by a more lighthouse-like steel and glass lantern room with a domed roof, As well as being a private home, the Lighthouse is available to rent for short-term stays.

== See also ==
- List of lighthouses in England
