= Minsmere–Walberswick Heaths and Marshes =

Protected area in Suffolk, England

- Site of Special Scientific Interest
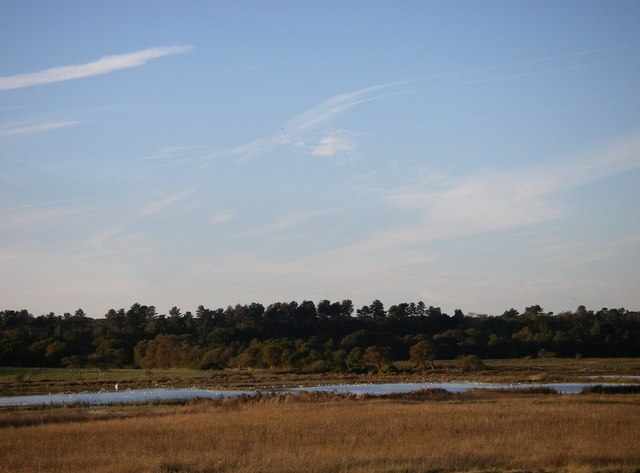
- Dingle Marshes, part of the Minsmere–Walberswick Heaths and Marshes SSSI

- Minsmere–Walberswick Heaths and Marshes within Suffolk
- Location of Minsmere–Walberswick Heaths and Marshes.
- Area of search: Suffolk
- Grid reference: TM469681
- Coordinates: 52.256°N 1.617°E
- Interest: Biological
- Area: 2,325.89 hectares (23 km^{2}; 9.0 sq mi)
- Notification date: 1993

Minsmere–Walberswick Heaths and Marshes are a Special Area of Conservation and Site of Special Scientific Interest in the English county of Suffolk. The site is located on the North Sea coast between Southwold and Sizewell, extending over an area of coastline around 7 miles (11 km) in length. The site is also designated as a Special Protection Area, part of the Minsmere–Walberswick European Marine Site and contains areas designated as Ramsar sites and Natura 2000 sites. It lies within the Suffolk Coast and Heaths Area of Outstanding Natural Beauty and is made up of a "complex mosaic" of marshes, reed beds, shingle banks and lowland heath habitats.

The SSSI covers an area of 2,325.89 hectares (8.98 sq mi; 23.26 km^{2}). It is a composite site and was formed by the amalgamation of the Minsmere Level, Walberswick and Brick Kiln Walks SSSI units. It extends from Hen Reedbeds and Southwold Common north of the River Blyth, through Walberswick and Dunwich to Westleton, Minsmere and Eastbridge to the north of Sizewell nuclear power stations. The area includes the Suffolk Coast National Nature Reserve sites at Hen Reedbeds, Walberswick and Dingle Marshes, the National Trust property at Dunwich Heath and the Minsmere RSPB reserve. It is a Nature Conservation Review site, Grade I, and covers two nature reserves managed by the Suffolk Wildlife Trust, Dingle Marshes and Hen Reedbeds.

== Special Area of Conservation ==
The Special Area of Conservation is 1,265.52 hectares (4.89 sq mi; 12.66 km^{2}) in area and extends from south of the River Blyth at Walberswick to Westleton and Minsmere to the south where it includes the Minsmere RSPB reserve and marshes alongside the Minsmere River. This area includes a range of habitats, including lowland heath and shingle beach vegetation.

== See also ==
- List of Sites of Special Scientific Interest in Suffolk
