= Walberswick railway station =

Former railway station in England

Walberswick
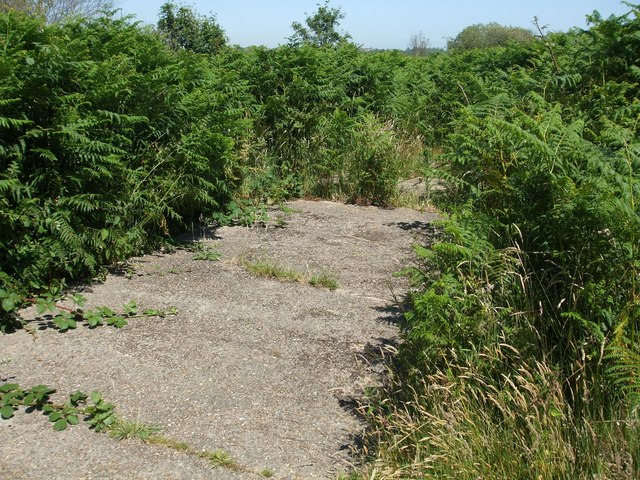
- Station site in 2008

General information
- Location: Walberswick, East Suffolk; England
- Coordinates: 52.32107°N 1.65306°E
- Grid reference: TM490755
- Platforms: 1

Other information
- Status: Disused

History
- Original company: Southwold Railway

Key dates
- 24 September 1879: Station opens
- 12 April 1929: Station closes
Location

Walberswick railway station was located in Walberswick, Suffolk, England. It closed in 1929, 50 years after it had opened for passenger traffic.

| Preceding station | Disused railways | Following station |
|---|---|---|
| Blythburgh | Southwold Railway | Southwold |
