= Southwold Lighthouse =

Lighthouse in Southwold, Waveney, Suffolk, England

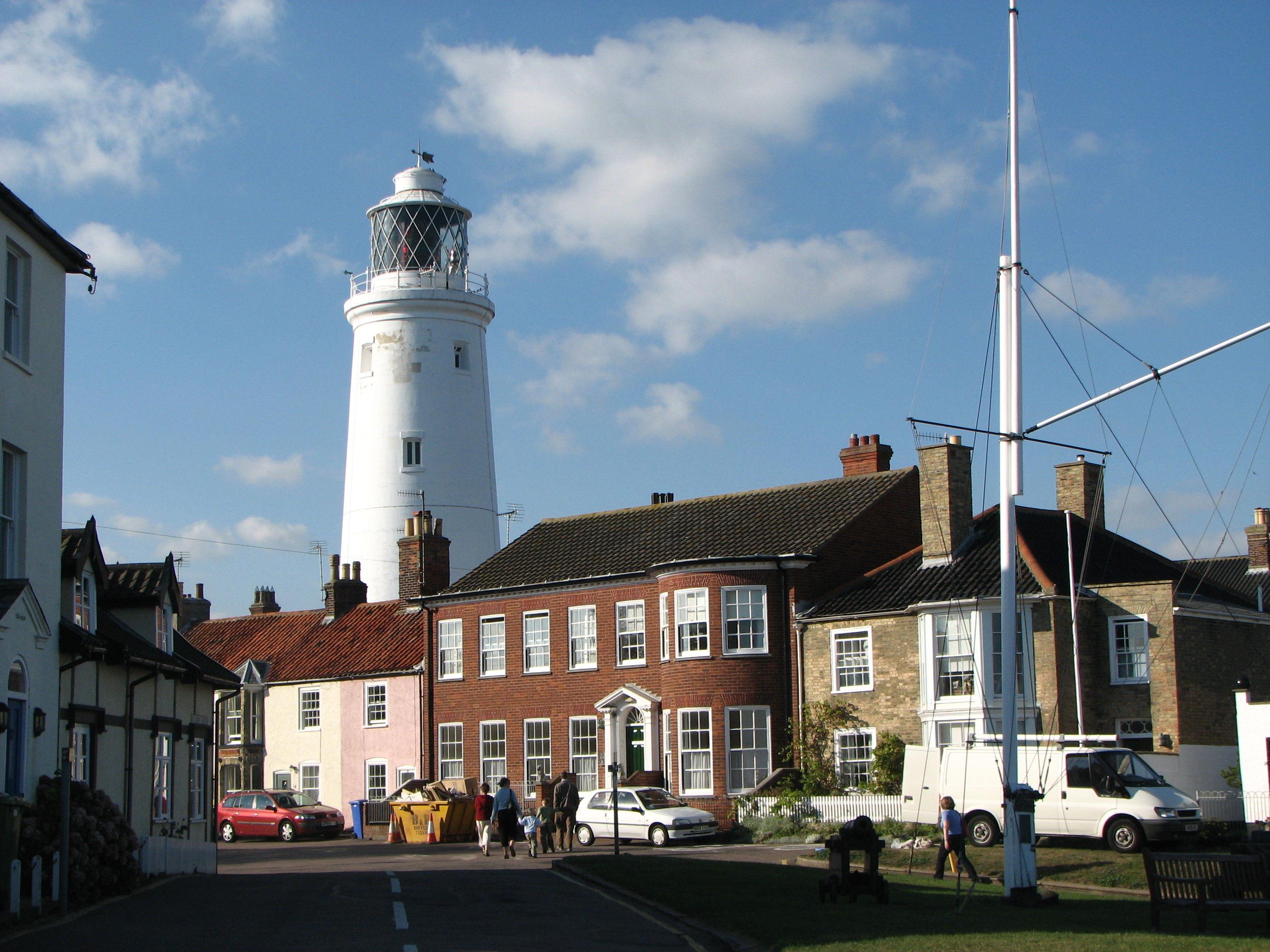
- The lighthouse in 2007
- Location: Southwold, Suffolk
- OS grid: TM5094276284
- Coordinates: 52°19′38″N 01°40′53″E

Tower
- Constructed: 1890
- Construction: brick tower
- Automated: 1938
- Height: 31 metres (102 ft)
- Shape: cylindrical tower with balcony and lantern
- Markings: white tower and lantern
- Operator: Trinity House
- Heritage: Grade II listed building

Light
- Focal height: 37 metres (121 ft)
- Lens: 1st order 920 mm focal length, catadioptric fixed lens (original), Pelangi PRL400TH (current)
- Intensity: 17,100 candela
- Range: 24 nautical miles (44 km)
- Characteristic: White rotating – flashing once every 10 seconds

Southwold Lighthouse is a lighthouse operated by Trinity House in the centre of Southwold in Suffolk, England. It stands on the North Sea coast, acting as a warning light for shipping passing along the east coast and as a guide for vessels navigating to Southwold harbour.

The lighthouse, which is a prominent local landmark, was commissioned in 1890, and was automated and electrified in 1938. It survived a fire in its original oil-fired lamp just six days after commissioning and today operates a 180-watt main navigation lamp. This lamp has a range of 24 nautical miles (44 km; 28 mi).

== History ==
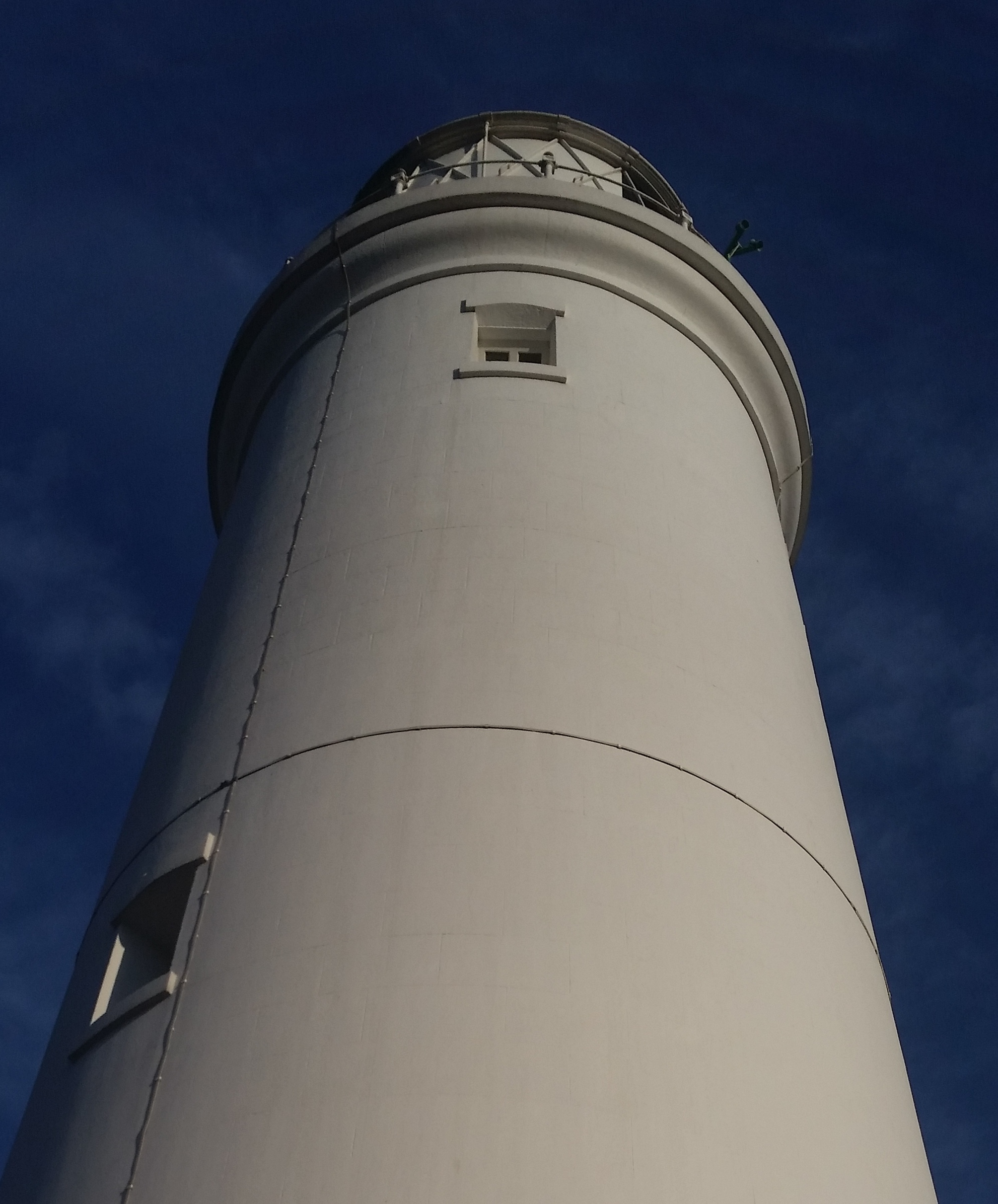
Southwold Lighthouse

Construction of the lighthouse began in 1887, led by Sir James Douglass, Engineer in Chief of Trinity House. A light was lit on a temporary structure in February 1889 and the lighthouse itself began operating on 3 September 1890. Previously, three fixed lights had been displayed from the cliff at Southwold; these were now discontinued. Both the lantern (the uppermost part of the structure) and the optic (a first-order fixed Fresnel lens), had originally been built by Chance Brothers in 1868 for Happisburgh Low Lighthouse; they became available for re-use when the latter light was demolished in 1883.

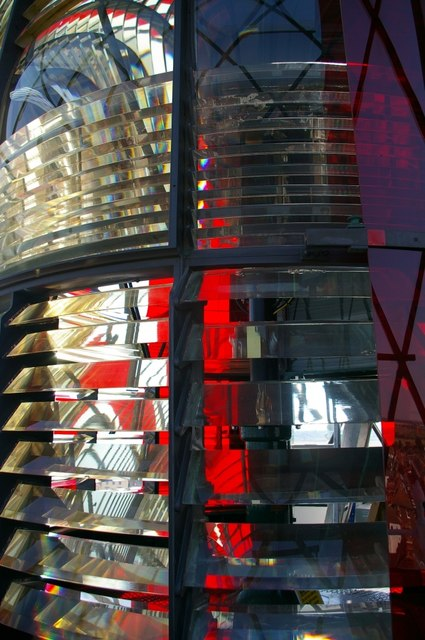
Lower half of the 1868 optic (pictured in 2007)

The light was initially powered by a six-wick Argand oil burner; it displayed a group occulting characteristic (the light being eclipsed twice every 20 seconds) and had a visible range of 17 nautical miles (31 km; 20 mi). The light was white, but shone red across defined sectors to the north and to the south (indicating the Barnard sands and Sizewell Bank respectively); in addition, 'spare' light, which would otherwise have shone needlessly westwards, was diverted by way of vertical condensing prisms so as to intensify these red sectors.

Just six days after the light was commissioned there was a fire in the lighthouse with the burner being destroyed. The inexperience of the new lighthouse keepers was blamed for the fire.

The burner was replaced with an oil-fired light in 1906 and a petroleum burner in 1923. The light was electrified and automated in 1938, at which time the light characteristic was changed to group flashing, 6 flashes every 20 seconds (modified to 4 flashes in 1965). It was converted to battery operation, with the batteries charged using mains electricity, in 2001. Until 2013 a cluster of three 90-watt Osram Halostar lamps provided the main light within the optic (which had a range of 17 nautical miles (31 km; 20 mi)).

The lighthouse, along with Lowestoft Lighthouse to the north, was threatened with closure by Trinity House in 2005, with shipping companies increasingly using satellite navigation systems rather than relying on lighthouses. Both lighthouses were reprieved in 2009 following a review by Trinity House that found that satellite navigation systems were not yet sufficiently reliable.

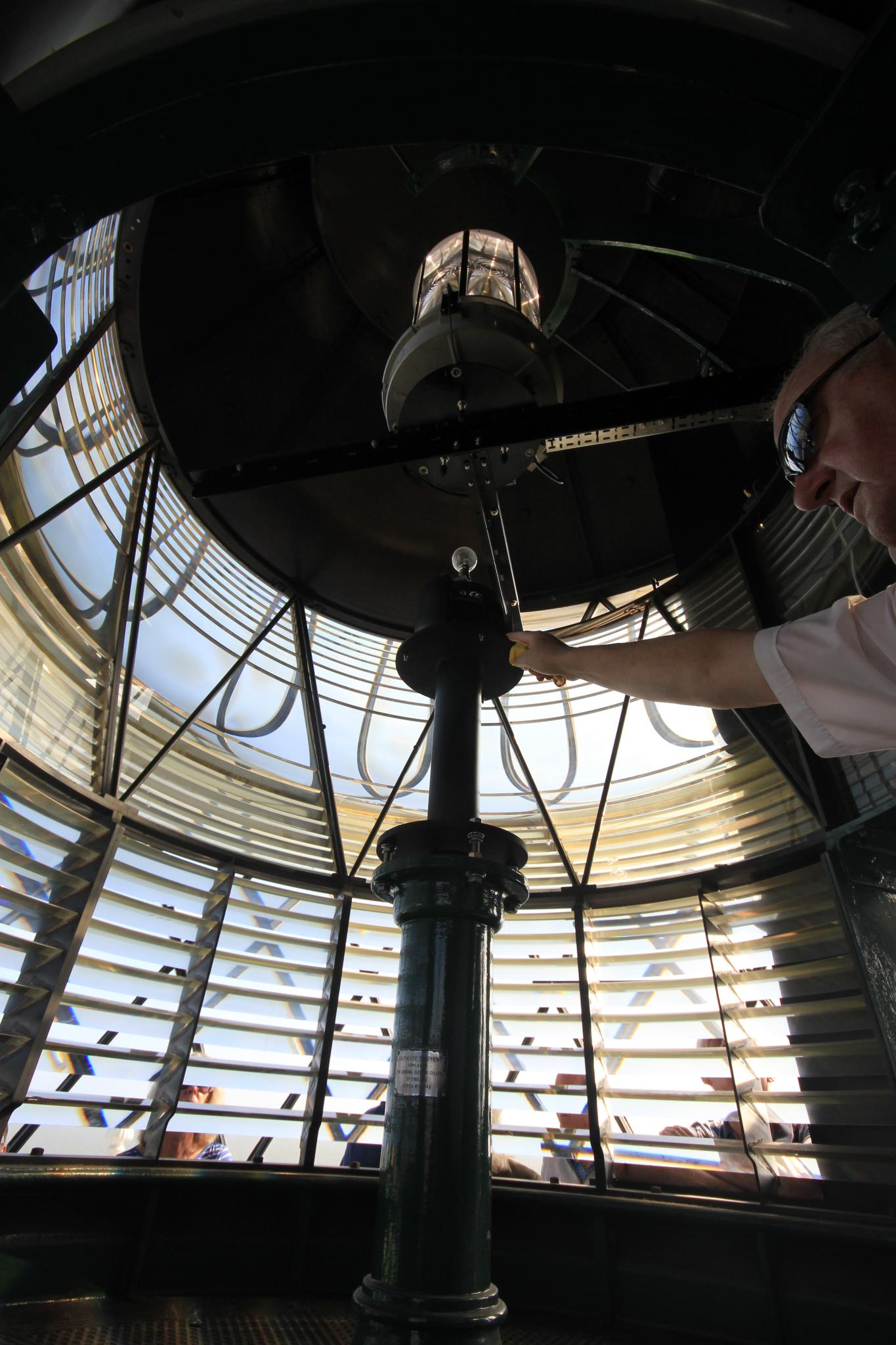
2014: Central and lower parts of the old optic retained for emergency use; above it, the new main lamp inside a small rotating optic.

Then in December 2012, the range of Southwold's light was increased to 24 nautical miles (44 km; 28 mi), to compensate for the imminent closure of Orfordness Lighthouse (which took place in June 2013). This was achieved by installing a new main light: a BLV Topspot 90 Volt Metal Halide 150-watt lamp placed within a small revolving optic. To make space for it within the lantern room the upper prismatic section of the old optic was removed (one section was put on display at the foot of the tower, another was loaned to Happisburgh Lighthouse where it has been put on display not far from its original location). The central and lower sections of the old lens, together with its lamp, have been retained for use as an emergency backup.

== Current display ==
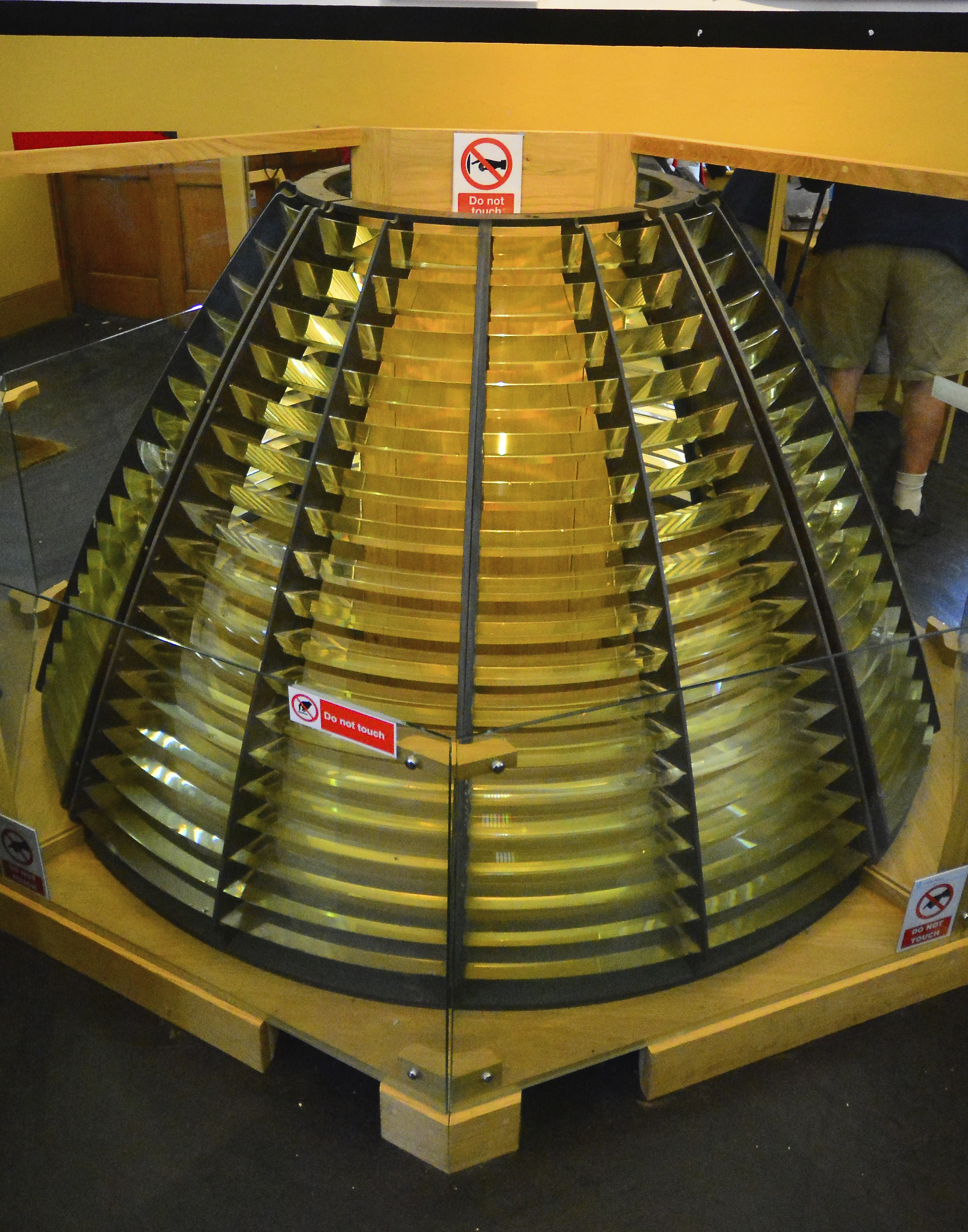
2014: Part of the upper section of the 1868 optic, removed and on display at the foot of the tower.

Since January 2016 a 180-watt revolving MFR (LED reflector) lamp manufactured by Mediterraneo Sanales Maritimas has been in use as the main lamp. The current light characteristic is one white flash every 10 seconds (Fl(1).W.10s) visible between 204°–032.5°. The white light is used for general navigation. Red sectors, previously used to mark shoals to the north and offshore sandbanks at Sizewell to the south, were removed as part of the 2012 refit.

== Buildings ==
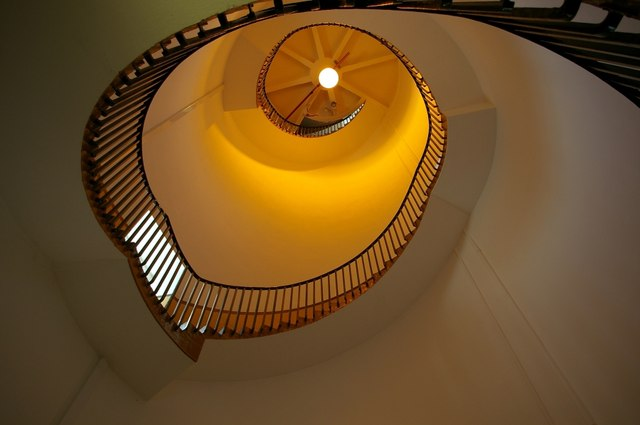
Inside the tower

The lighthouse is 31 metres (102 ft) tall, standing 37 metres (121 ft) above sea level. It is built of brick and painted white, and has 113 steps around a spiral staircase. Two keeper's cottages were built next to the lighthouse rather than living quarters being made in the lighthouse itself.

The lighthouse is a Grade II listed building. Guided visits are, from 2023, run by the Adnams brewery, which stands nearby, and may be booked via that company's website.

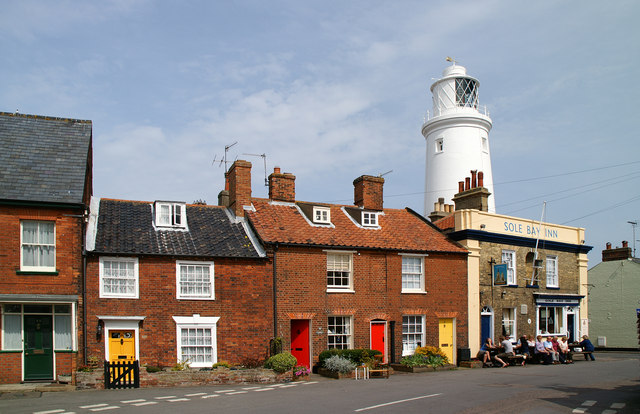
Southwold Lighthouse

The lighthouse was the site of charity abseil events in 2009, 2011 and 2013. The events raised money for the Southwold lifeboat operated by the RNLI from Southwold harbour.

== Cultural references ==
The lighthouse has featured in television programmes, including an episode of Kavanagh QC and the children's television series Grandpa in My Pocket. It also appears in the art house movie Drowning by Numbers, directed by Peter Greenaway. Adnams brewery, which operates from the town, has named a pale ale Lighthouse in recognition of the importance of the lighthouse as a landmark in Southwold and has featured the lighthouse on promotional material.

== See also ==
- List of lighthouses in England
