= Orfordness Lighthouse =

Grade II listed lighthouse in the United kingdom

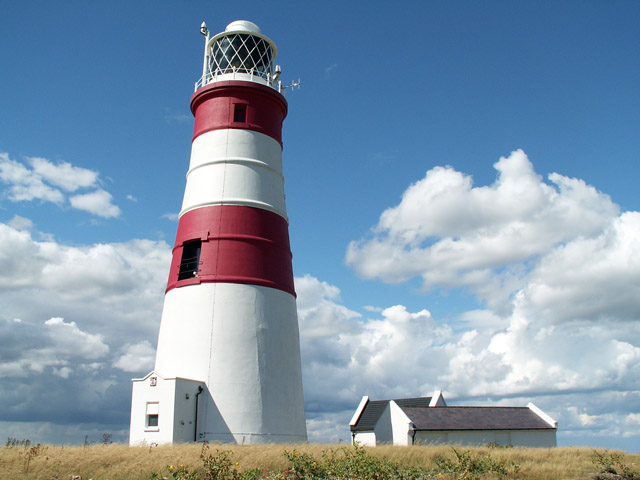
- Orfordness Lighthouse (in 2008)
- Location: Orfordness; Suffolk; England
- OS grid: TM4498348865
- Coordinates: 52.083940°N 1.574246°E

Tower
- Constructed: 1637 (first)
- Construction: brick tower
- Automated: 1965
- Height: 30 m (98 ft)
- Shape: tapered cylindrical tower with balcony and lantern
- Markings: white tower with two red bands, white lantern
- Operator: Orfordness Lighthouse Trust
- Heritage: Grade II listed building

Light
- First lit: 1792 (current)
- Deactivated: 2013
- Lens: 2nd order 700mm, three panel catadioptric
- Range: 25 nautical miles (46 km; 29 mi)
- Characteristic: Fl W 5s.

Orfordness Lighthouse was a lighthouse on Orford Ness, in Suffolk, England. The 30-metre (98 ft) tower was completed in 1792. Work began on demolition in July 2020, and was completed in August. The light had a range of 25 nautical miles (46 km; 29 mi). It was equipped with an Automatic Identification System transmitter with Maritime Mobile Service Identity number 992351016.

== History ==
The first lights in this area were constructed in 1637: a pair of wooden leading lights. In 1720 the patent rights were acquired by Henry Grey, Esq.; he replaced the decaying wooden lighthouses with a pair of brick towers at a cost of £1,850. The lower light, however, went on to be beset by a series of problems: the tower was washed away in 1724; it was replaced by a timber hut, it was likewise washed away, in 1730. Its replacement, a timber tower, was destroyed by fire that same year, as was a second replacement the following year. A new tower was built in 1733. In 1746 the high light was coal-fired, the low light was oil-lit.

These were replaced in 1780 by a pair of brick octagonal towers. Scarcely a dozen years later the lower light of the two was precariously close to the sea due to shore erosion; it collapsed not long afterward.

In 1792, anticipating this inevitability, the landowner Lord Braybrooke built a new 'high light' in a different position. This is the lighthouse which stood until 2020 when it was demolished due to continuing shore erosion. The old high light then functioned as the new 'low light'. Both were fitted with Argand lamps and reflectors (there were fourteen burners in the high light, later increased to sixteen).

In 1837 the lease of the Orfordness lighthouses (held together with Winterton Lighthouse to the north) was purchased by Trinity House. The following year, the low light was fitted with a fixed array of dioptric lenses and mirrors by Isaac Cookson & co. of Newcastle upon Tyne (the mirrors were replaced by prisms in 1850). In 1839 a novel Bude light was installed in the low lighthouse on an experimental basis, to test its appropriateness for use as a navigational light (ultimately the high cost of operation prevented further development in this regard).

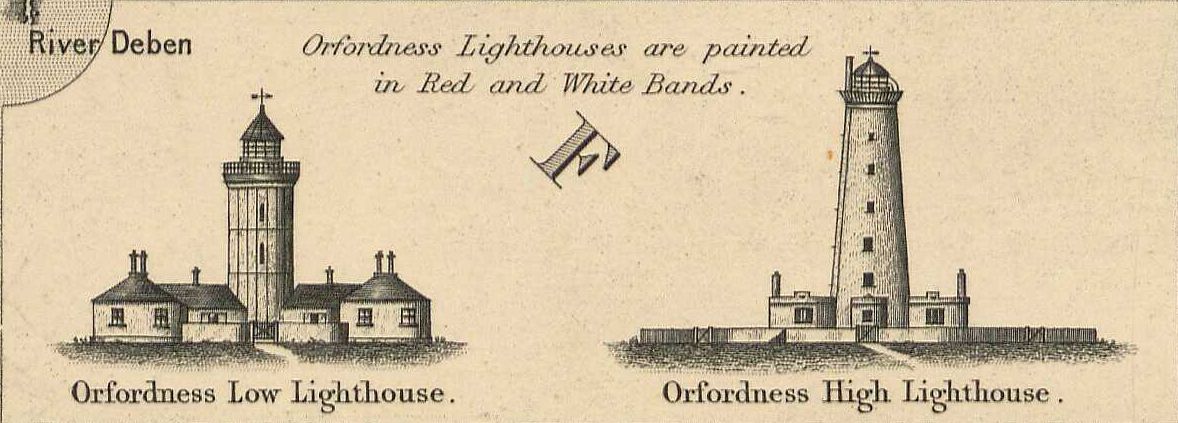
Detail of an 1875 nautical chart depicting the two lighthouses

In 1864 both lighthouses were painted with red and white horizontal bands (they had previously been all red). The high light retained its Argand lamps and reflectors until 1868, when they were replaced by a multi-wick lamp and a large (first-order) fixed optic, engineered by James Chance. At the same time a red sector was added to the low light (marking Sizewell Bank to the north-east) and to the high light (marking the edge of the deep water channel through Hollesley Bay to the south-west).

In 1887 the low light was again lost to erosion; this time it was not replaced (though Southwold Lighthouse, some 24 nautical miles (44 km; 28 mi) to the north, was established shortly afterwards "in lieu thereof"). Instead, in 1888, red and green sectors were added to the high light, which was made occulting (with the light being eclipsed for three seconds in every forty). A subsidiary white light was also introduced, shining "north-eastward from a window 60 feet below the high light, visible over an arc of about 25°, covering Aldborough ridge, and to assist vessels in rounding Orfordness".

The lighthouse was further modernized in 1914: a new revolving optic was installed (which remained in use for 99 years), and a new additional light was installed along with fixed lenses at a level below the lantern, so the sector lights now shone from windows on the tower. The lighthouse was electrified in 1959, and in 1964 it became the first lighthouse to be monitored by telemetry from Harwich, ushering in a process of lighthouse automation which continued around England over the next 35 years. The keepers were withdrawn from Orfordness the following year.

== Decommissioning ==
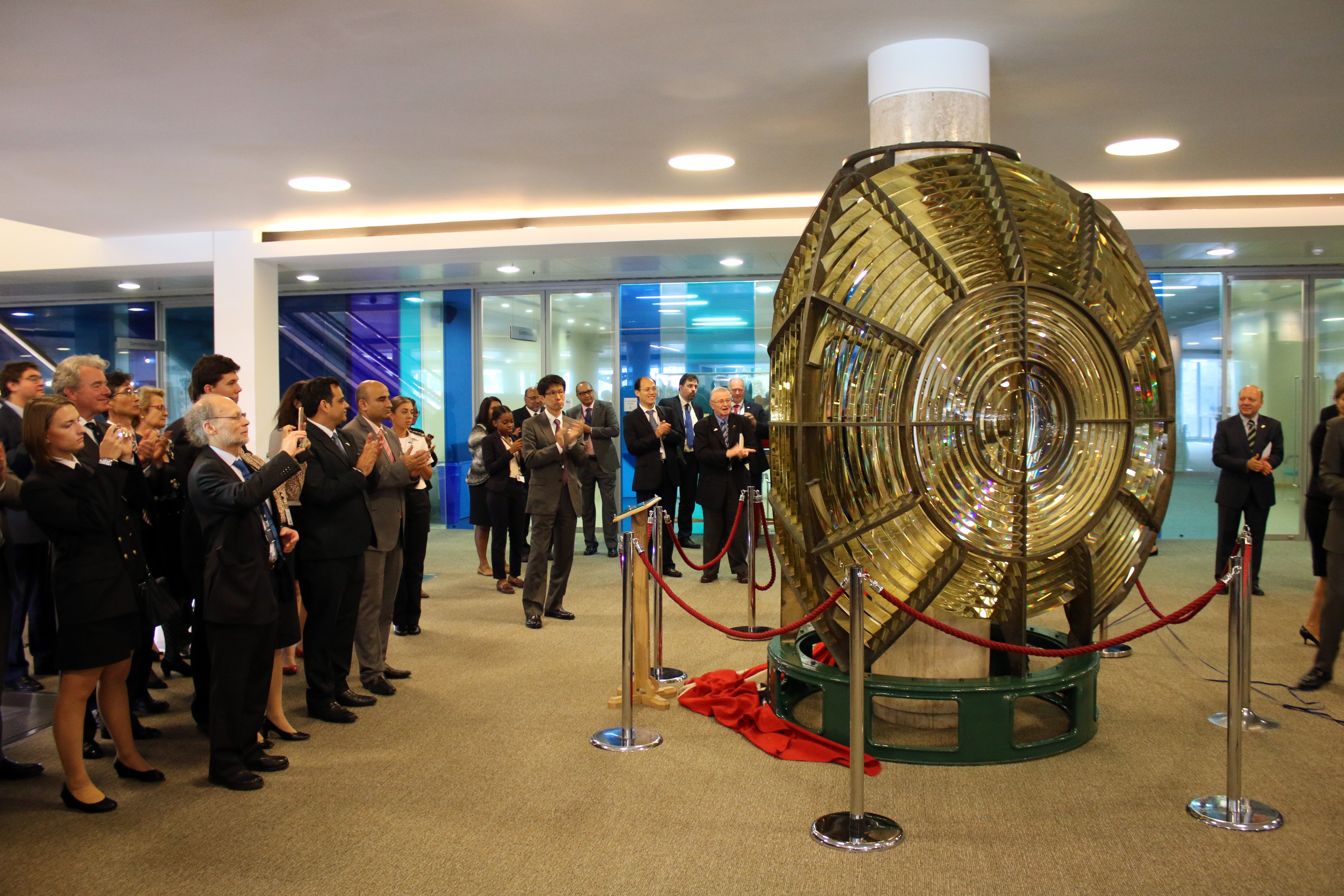
Unveiling of the decommissioned optic from Orfordness at the IMO HQ in 2015

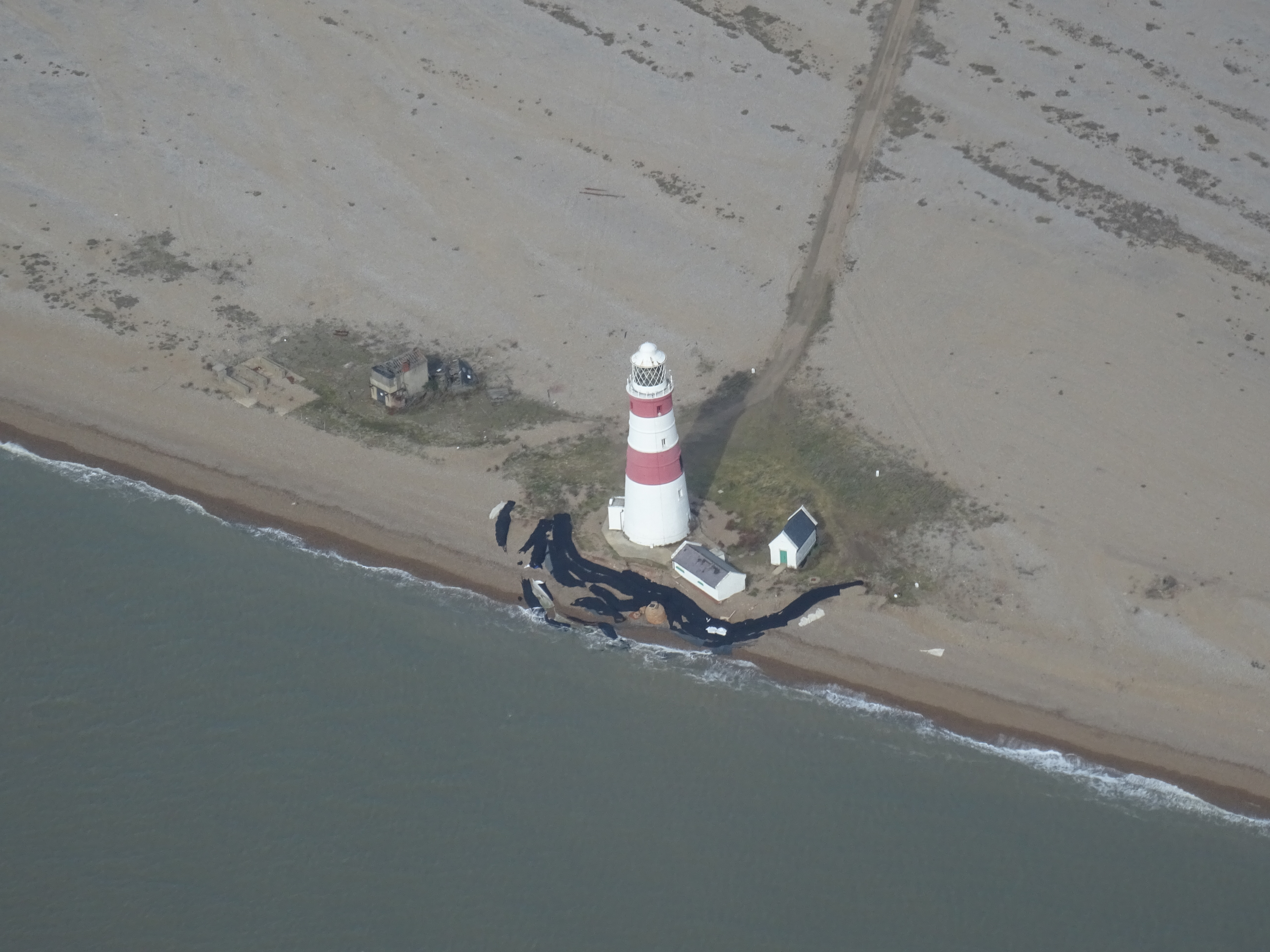
By 2019, coastal erosion was threatening the lighthouse.

The lighthouse was decommissioned on 27 June 2013, because of the encroaching sea. The modern electrical equipment and hazardous materials (mercury) have been removed. Trinity House has increased the power of the light at Southwold Lighthouse to compensate for the closure of Orfordness lighthouse. Unless demolished, the Orfordness tower was expected to survive for seven to eight years before falling into the North Sea. In September 2019 however, high tides and harsh weather damaged the lighthouse's ancillary bungalow, originally an outbuilding of the lighthouse keeper's cottages, causing it partly to collapse, requiring it to be demolished, and brought the shoreline only feet from the lighthouse itself. In July 2020 work began to dismantle the structure.

The 1913 optic has been removed and is now displayed at the London headquarters of the International Maritime Organization.

== Orfordness Lighthouse Trust ==
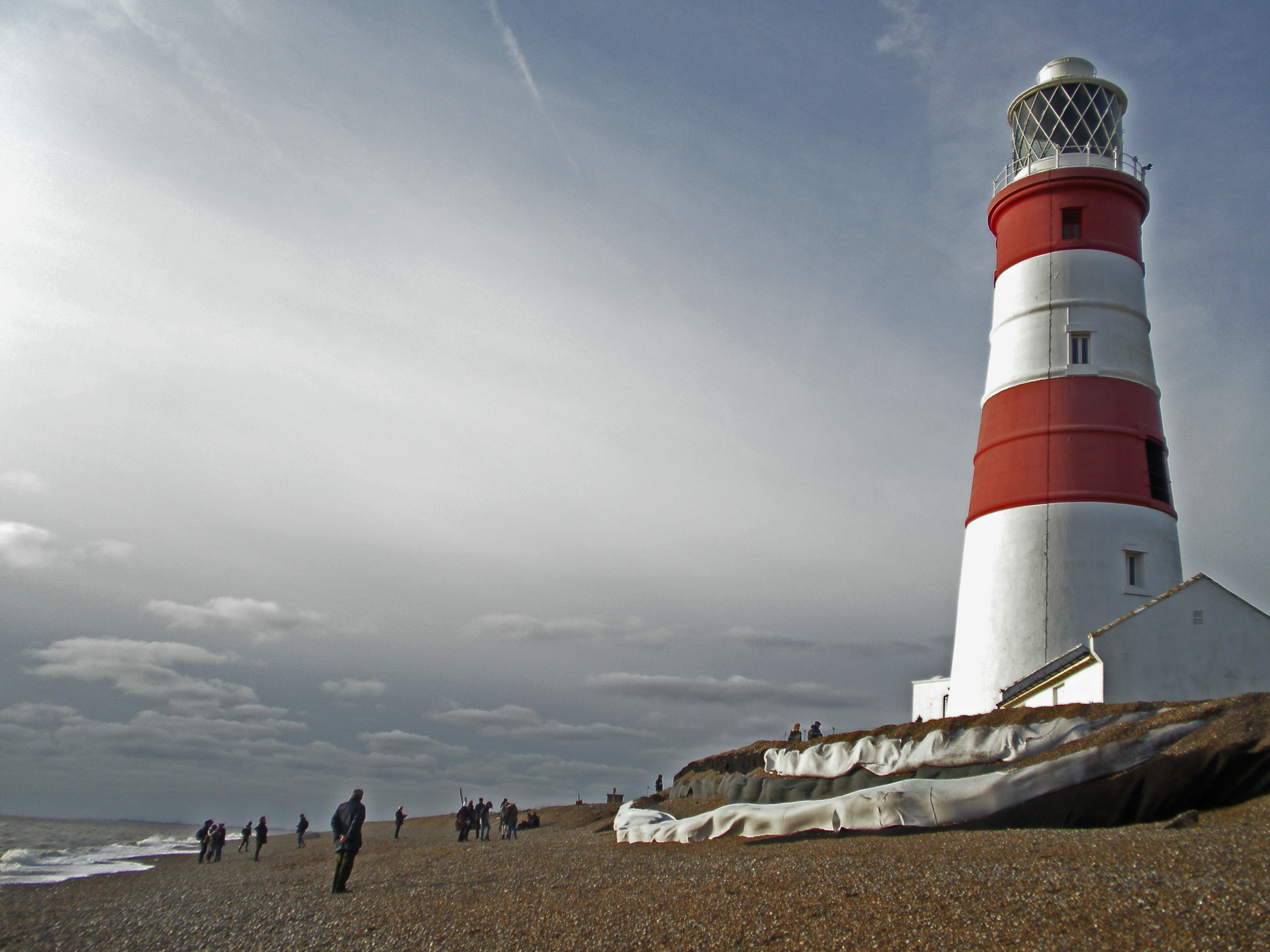
The lighthouse and sea defences in 2016

After decommissioning, the lighthouse was purchased by the Orfordness Lighthouse Trust, a registered charity established "to preserve the Lighthouse for as long as possible and its legacy after that". Under the Trust's stewardship, the lighthouse was opened to the public on specified days each summer between 2013 and 2019. In the winter of 2013–14, 10 metres of the surrounding beach was lost to erosion; Trust volunteers then installed a sea defence, in the form of gravel-filled bags, to help protect the low cliff in front of the lighthouse. Notwithstanding these measures, the lighthouse remained "at imminent risk of falling into the sea". In 2019 the Trust said that it was committed to keeping the lighthouse standing for as long as possible. For the longer term, it aspired "to dismantle the Lighthouse and rebuild a replica elsewhere on the Ness". With this in mind, the optic was removed in 2014. Storms in September 2019 undermined the bungalow beside the lighthouse, causing it to collapse, and erosion of the beach in front of the structures and to either side of them prevented any further work to repair their foundations and the deployment of any more sea defences. In winter storms in early 2020, the lighthouse's oil store was swept away and only the tower remained undamaged. The Times reported on 18 July 2020 that work on demolition had begun. It quoted Nicholas Gold of the Trust as saying: "In recent months the building has become a hazard." By mid-August, the lighthouse had been completely demolished, but the Trust aim to build a 'tribute', involving the top third of the former lighthouse and some other objects salvaged.

== See also ==
- List of lighthouses in England
