= Suffolk Coast National Nature Reserve =

Nature reserve in Suffolk, England

Coordinates: 52.316°N 1.625°E

Designations

Ramsar Wetland
- Official name: Minsmere – Walberswick
- Designated: 5 January 1976
- Reference no.: 75

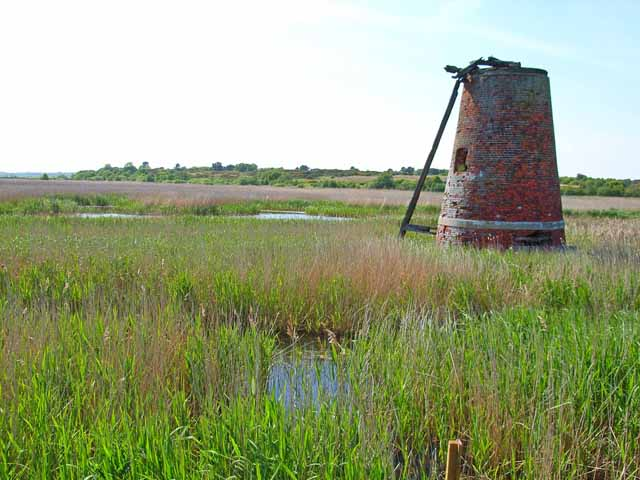
Windpump on marshes south of Walberswick

Suffolk Coast National Nature Reserve is a wildlife reserve on the North Sea coast of the English county of Suffolk. It is located around the village of Walberswick to the south of the town of Southwold. The reserve was designated in 2003, combining the existing Walberswick National Nature Reserve with reserves at Dingle Marshes and Hen Reedbeds to create a 1,340 hectares (3,300 acres) reserve.

The reserve is managed by Natural England in conjunction with the RSPB and Suffolk Wildlife Trust. The Dingle Marshes reserve is owned jointly by these two organisations, whilst the Hen Reedbeds area is owned by Suffolk Wildlife Trust. The Walberswick marshes section of the reserve is largely in private ownership and managed by Natural England. The reserve lies within the Minsmere-Walberswick Heaths and Marshes Site of Special Scientific Interest and includes areas designated as Natura 2000 sites and Ramsar sites.

== History ==
The marshland areas of the reserve were drained to use as farmland between the 16th and 18th centuries, providing grazing land. The marshes to the south of Walberswick were flooded during the Second World War to act as invasion defences. A number of pillboxes and other military defences can be found on the reserve. The marshes reverted to reedbeds during the 1940s and 50s, creating a range of habitats which are now preserved in the reserve. The reeds are cut by local commercial reedcutters for use in thatching, whilst grazing marshland is used for cattle grazing.

Heathland areas of the reserve were traditionally used for grazing sheep. Rabbits played a major role in maintaining this landscape until the mixamatosis outbreak of 1953 after which much the heathland area of the reserve began to revert to birth woodland. Management of the heathland areas of the reserve has involved the removal of woodland species and the reintroduction of sheep grazing to retain the heathland in its traditional form.

== Habitats ==
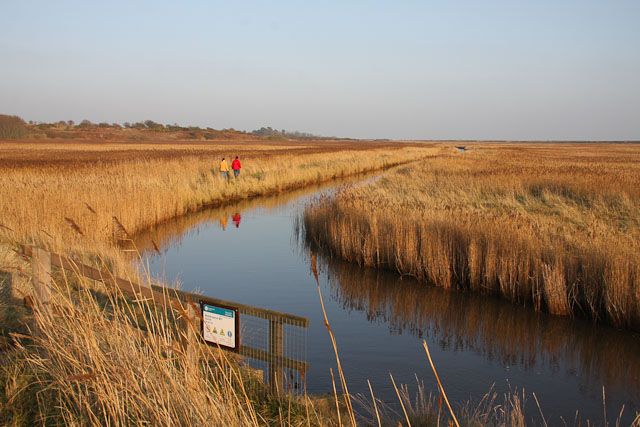
Marshes south of Walberswick

The Walberswick section of the reserve is the largest at 1,192 hectares (2,950 acres). It contains a range of habitats including reedbed, hay meadows, grazing marshes, heather and grass heathlands and a variety of mixed and broadleaved woodlands. Along the coast shingle banks and beaches, saline lagoons and intertidal estuary and saltings are also present, providing a range of fresh, brackish and salt water habitats, whilst the area along the Blyth estuary provides mudflats and grazing marsh.

The reserve has around 500 species of butterflies and moths, including the silver-studded blue and white admiral butterflies. Other invertebrate species include solitary bees and wasps, ant-lions and over 100 species of cranefly. Bird species number around 300, including bitterns and marsh harriers, whilst mammals found include otters and five species of deer. Natterjack toads have been re-introduced to the area. Flora found in the reserve include species such as marsh sowthistle, bog pimpernel, sneezewort, and greater bladderwort in the wetland areas. Heathland areas feature species such as fenugreek and mossy stonecrop.

Hen Reedbeds contains a mixture of reedbed, dykes, pools and fen habitats. Dingle Marshes contains a mixture of coastal and freshwater wetland habitats, including brackish pools. Both are nationally important breeding grounds for bitterns and marsh harriers, whilst Dingle Marshes is an internationally important site for the starlet sea anemone.

== Facilities ==
A number of car parks and waymarked walking routes are provided on the reserve. Three audio trails can be downloaded and used by visitors. Three permanent bird hides are sited on the reserve.
