= Walberswick =

Village in Suffolk, England

Coordinates: 52.313°N 1.667°E

Walberswick: The Wick
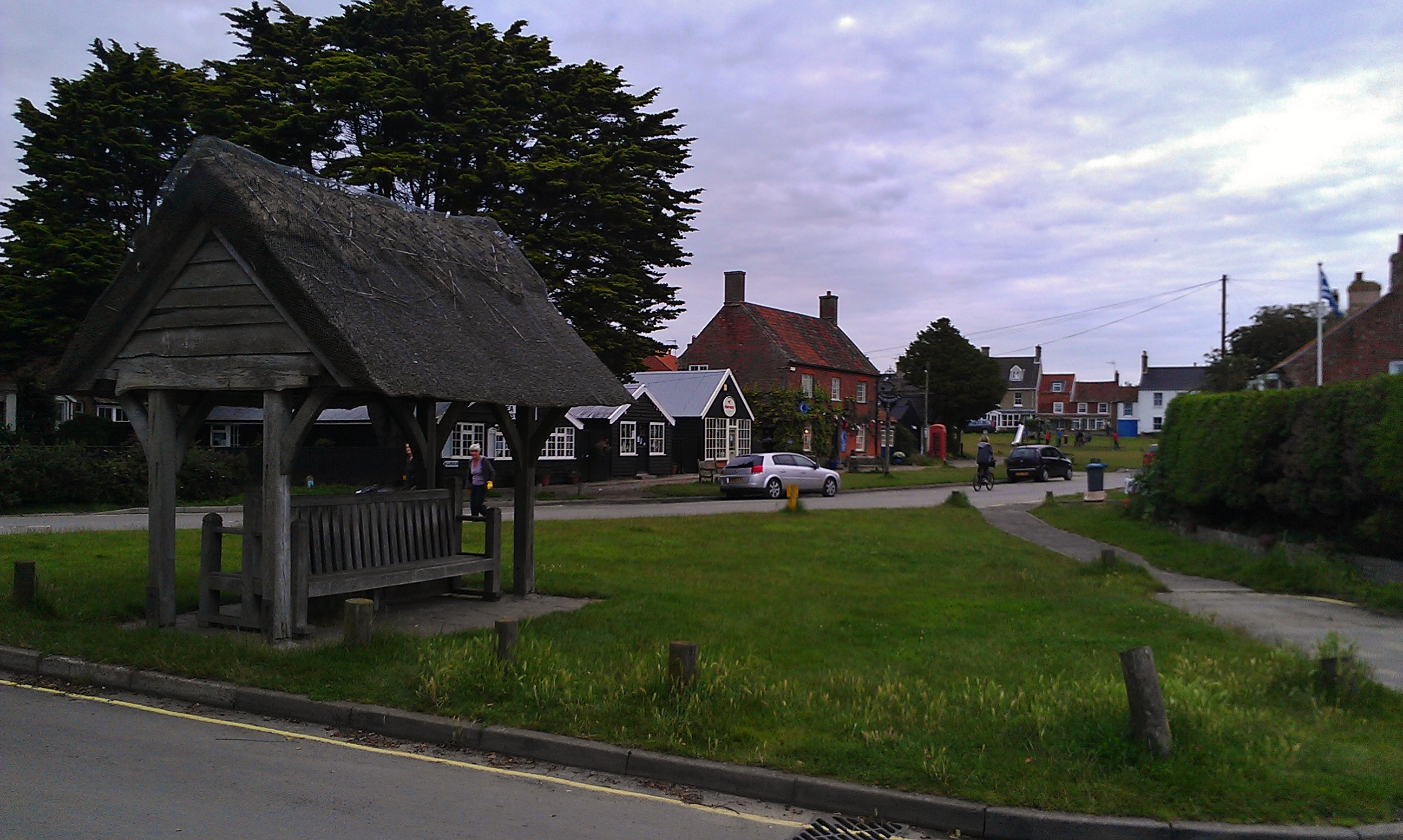
- Walberswick in July 2012

- Location within Suffolk
- Area: 7.89 km^{2} (3.05 sq mi)
- Population: 380 (2011)
  - Density: 48/km^{2} (120/sq mi)
- District: East Suffolk
- Shire county: Suffolk
- Region: East
- Country: England
- Sovereign state: United Kingdom
- Post town: Southwold
- Postcode district: IP18
- Dialling code: 01502

Walberswick is a village and civil parish on the Suffolk coast in England. It is at the mouth of the River Blyth on the south side of the river. The town of Southwold lies to the north of the river and is the nearest town to Walberswick, around 1 mile (1.6 km) away. Walberswick is around 11 miles (18 km) south of Lowestoft on the North Sea coast. It is 7 miles (11 km) east of Halesworth and 28 miles (45 km) northeast of the county town of Ipswich.

Coastal erosion and the shifting of the mouth of the River Blyth caused the neighbouring town of Dunwich, 3 miles (4.8 km) to the south, to be lost as a port in the last years of the 13th century. Following a brief period of rivalry and dispute with Dunwich, Walberswick became a major trading port from the 13th century until the First World War. Almost half of the village's properties are holiday homes.

== History ==
The name Walberswick is believed to derive from the Saxon Waldbert – probably a landowner – and "wyc", meaning shelter or harbour. At the top of the village is the 15th-century St Andrew's Church, which has been reduced in size since its medieval heyday. The size of the remaining St Andrew's ruins demonstrate how large the parish church once was.

The name 'Walleburyswyke', appearing in a Latin legal record, dated 1440, may refer to the village.

In 1914 Scottish architect and watercolourist Charles Rennie Mackintosh retired to the village with his wife Margaret Macdonald Mackintosh. She was also an artist, as well as being a designer well known in the Glasgow style movement.

The defences constructed around Walberswick during the Second World War have been documented. They included a number of pillboxes, landmines and flame fougasse installations. The beaches were protected with extensive barriers of scaffolding.

== Governance ==
Walberswick forms part of the parliamentary constituency of Suffolk Coastal. The local government district is East Suffolk District Council, and Walberswick is part of the Southwold electoral ward.

== Demography ==
The parish's population was 380 at the 2011 census. A large proportion of the homes in the village are second homes or rented holiday homes and are not permanently occupied.

== Natural environment ==
With over 1,000 acres (4 km^{2}) of heath and marshland protected within the Suffolk Coast and Heaths Area of Outstanding Natural Beauty, Walberswick has good varied local habitats for birds.

A derelict windmill stands on the marshes near Walberswick. The area around the village makes up the Suffolk Coast National Nature Reserve, a protected area on 1,340 hectares (3,300 acres) with a range of wetland and heathland habitats.

== Landmarks ==
The ornate metalwork village sign on the Green is a replica of one erected in 1953, at the village's main road entrance, to commemorate the coronation of Queen Elizabeth II. The original sign went missing in the 1980s, but after changing hands has since been returned and restored to mark the Queen's Diamond Jubilee in 2012. It was reinstalled opposite the church.

== Culture and community ==
The village and surrounding beach and marshland have long attracted residents drawn from the arts, film and media. In the 1890s and 1900s, the village became associated with Philip Wilson Steer and his circle of English Impressionists. It was home to the noted artist and architect Charles Rennie Mackintosh from 1914. It was also the birthplace of Oscar-nominated documentary film maker Humphrey Jennings, famous for his Second World War documentaries.

Considering its size, an inordinate number of British celebrities own or have owned holiday homes in the village including the late Clement Freud and his wife Jill, and their daughter Emma Freud and her partner Richard Curtis. Anna Freud (the daughter of Sigmund Freud) and Dorothy Burlingham (the daughter of Louis Comfort Tiffany) kept a weekend retreat there from the late 1940s until the early 1980s. Film director Paul Greengrass, Martin Bell and ITV's Director Peter Fincham have houses in the village, as did the late Geoffrey Palmer. Paul Heiney and Libby Purves live nearby.

The village is the setting for Esther Freud's novel The Sea House, thinly disguised as 'Steerborough'—presumably a coded reference, or in-joke, towards one-time resident Philip Wilson Steer (see above). Esther Freud, the cousin of Emma Freud and daughter of painter Lucian Freud, also has a house in the village with her husband, actor David Morrissey.

The village was famous for its annual crabbing competition, the British Open Crabbing Championship, last held in August 2010. The person who caught the heaviest crab within a period of 90 minutes was declared the winner. The proceeds supported many charitable causes.

Walberswick is reputedly haunted by the murderer Tobias Gill, who was hanged in the area in the 18th century. He is said to drive a phantom coach drawn by headless horses or a black hearse drawn by four black horses.

== Transport ==
Walberswick is on the B1387 road which runs from the A12 south of Blythburgh to the village where it terminates. It is at the mouth of the River Blyth which forms part of Southwold Harbour. Some mooring points for smaller craft in the harbour lie on the Walberswick side of the river. The river is crossed by the Bailey Bridge, a footbridge, to the west of the village. This provides pedestrian and bicycle access across the river to Southwold. A passenger ferry, operated by a rowing boat, operates across the river closer to the centre of the village during the tourist season.

Walberswick railway station was on the narrow-gauge Southwold Railway which ran from Halesworth (railway station) to Southwold (railway station). The station was located to the west of the village around 400 metres (440 yd) south of the crossing at the Bailey Bridge. The line and station closed on 11 April 1929. The nearest railway stations are in Halesworth and Darsham.

== Sources ==
- Foot, William (2006). Beaches, fields, streets, and hills ... the anti-invasion landscapes of England, 1940. Council for British Archaeology. ISBN 1-902771-53-2.
