= Southwold railway station =

Former railway station in England

Southwold

General information
- Location: Southwold, East Suffolk; England
- Coordinates: 52.33141°N 1.67447°E
- Grid reference: TM504767
- Platforms: 1

Other information
- Status: Disused

History
- Original company: Southwold Railway

Key dates
- 24 Sep 1879: Station opened
- 12 Apr 1929: Station closed
Location

Southwold railway station was located in Southwold, Suffolk. It closed in 1929, 50 years after it had opened for passenger traffic. The station was demolished after closure and the site in Station Road is now occupied by the Police Station.

Preceding station	Disused railways	Following station
Walberswick	Southwold Railway	Terminus
