= RSPB Minsmere =

Nature reserve in the United Kingdom

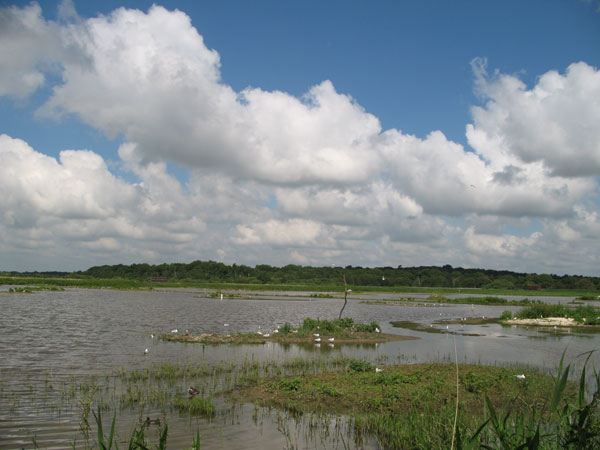
- Looking west over the scrape, an area of shallow water and bare mud

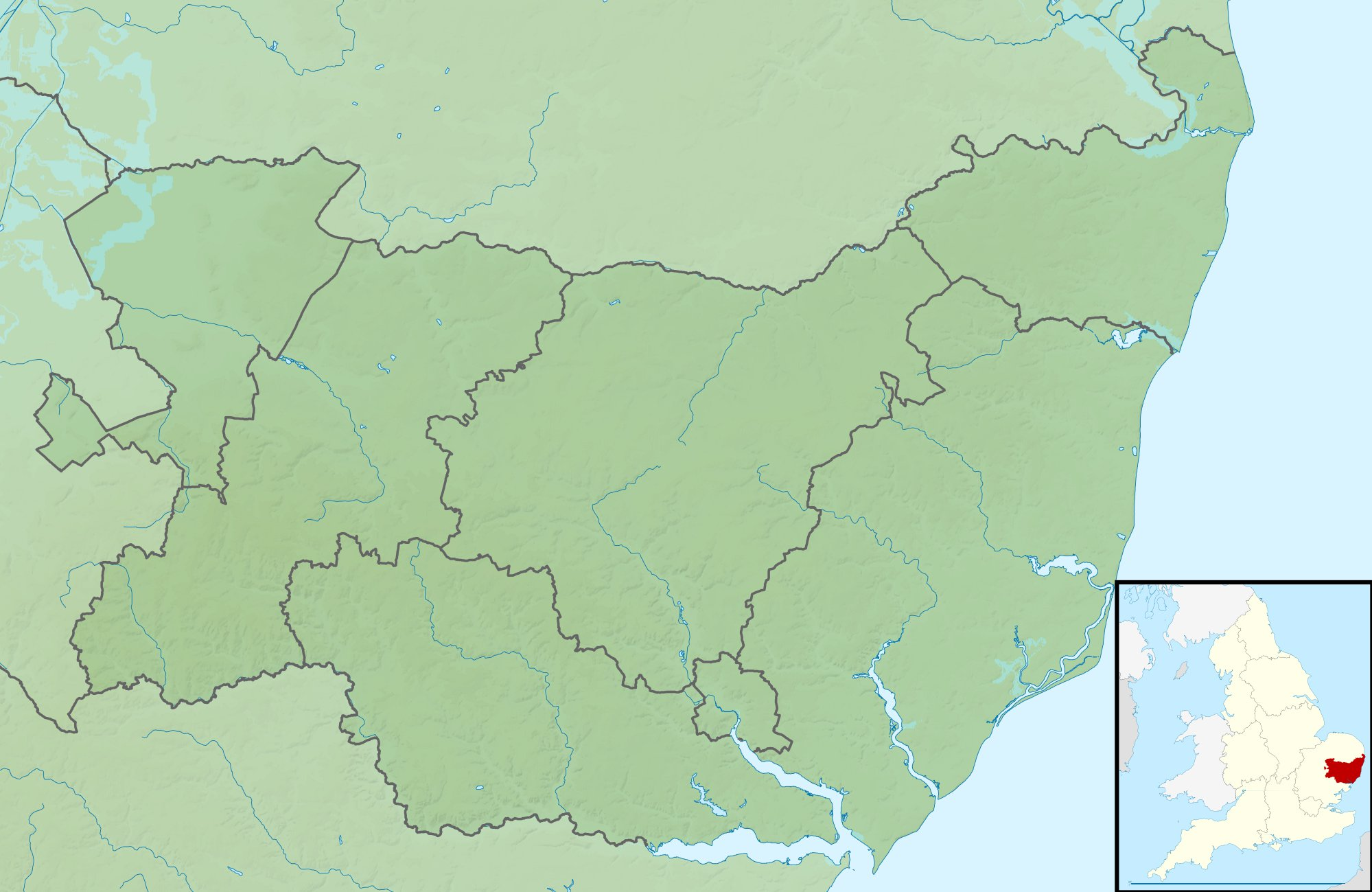
- Location within Suffolk
- Location: Suffolk, East of England, England
- Coordinates: 52°14′33″N 01°36′50″E
- Established: 1947
- Operator: Royal Society for the Protection of Birds
- Website: www.rspb.org.uk/days-out/reserves/minsmere

Ramsar Wetland
- Official name: Minsmere - Walberswick
- Designated: 5 January 1976
- Reference no.: 75

RSPB Minsmere is a nature reserve owned and managed by the Royal Society for the Protection of Birds (RSPB) at Minsmere, Suffolk. The 1,000-hectare (2,500-acre) site has been managed by the RSPB since 1947 and covers areas of reed bed, lowland heath, acid grassland, wet grassland, woodland and shingle vegetation. It lies within the Suffolk Coast and Heaths Area of Outstanding Natural Beauty and the Suffolk Heritage Coast area. It is conserved as a Site of Special Scientific Interest, Special Area of Conservation, Special Protection Area and Ramsar site.

The nature reserve is managed primarily for bird conservation, particularly through control and improvement of wetland, heath and grassland habitats, with particular emphasis on encouraging nationally uncommon breeding species such as the bittern, stone-curlew, bearded tit, marsh harrier, nightjar and nightingale. The diversity of habitats has also led to a wide variety of other animals and plants being recorded on the site.

Before becoming a nature reserve, the area was the site of an ancient abbey and a Tudor artillery battery. The marshes were reclaimed as farmland in the 19th century, but were re-flooded during World War II as a protection against possible invasion.

The reserve has a visitor centre, eight bird hides and an extensive network of footpaths and trails. Entry is free for RSPB members. Potential future threats to the site include flooding or salination as climate change causes rising sea levels, coastal erosion and possible effects on water levels due to the construction of a new reactor at the neighbouring Sizewell nuclear power stations.

== Landscape ==
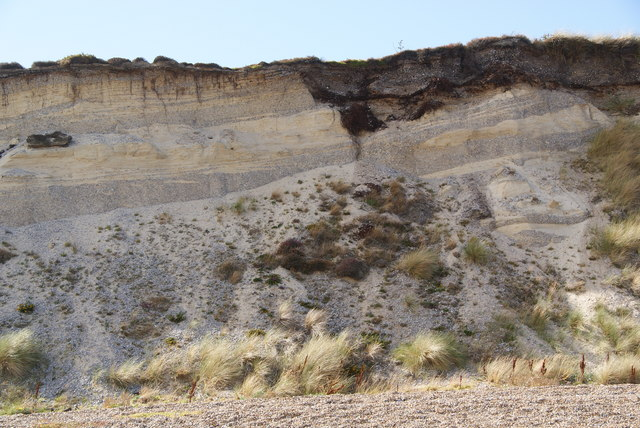
The cliffs at Minsmere

The area around Minsmere consists of the wide valley of the Minsmere River with Dunwich cliffs to the north and Sizewell cliffs to the south. Two extensive sandbanks lie off the coast, and the beach is sand overlain with shingle. The cliffs have a maximum height of about 17 m (56 ft) and are amongst the most rapidly eroding in the UK, at an annual rate of 1–2 m (3.3–6.6 ft).

From 500 BC to 700 AD, the sea level in Suffolk was about 6 m (20 ft) higher than it is today, and the low-lying areas of the present coast were then tidal estuaries. The river mouth was finally closed in the 18th century as sand and shingle deposits formed off the coast. The higher land consists of a deep layer of gravel and sand, the legacy of the beach formed by the sea before it retreated. The geology of the wetland areas below the topsoil is marine clay with darker freshwater deposits from the Minsmere River.

== History ==
=== Before 1947 ===
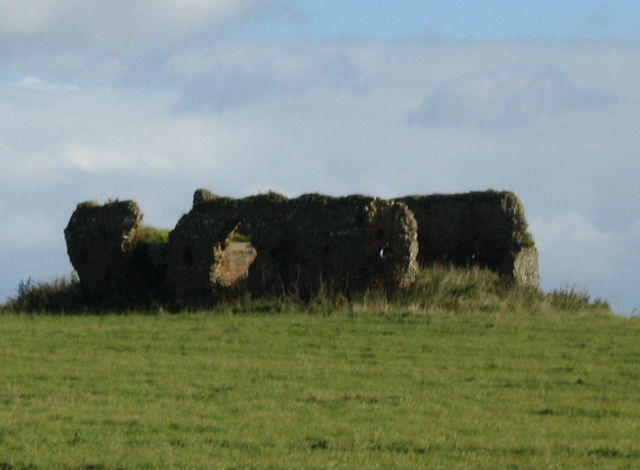
The ruins of Leiston Abbey chapel

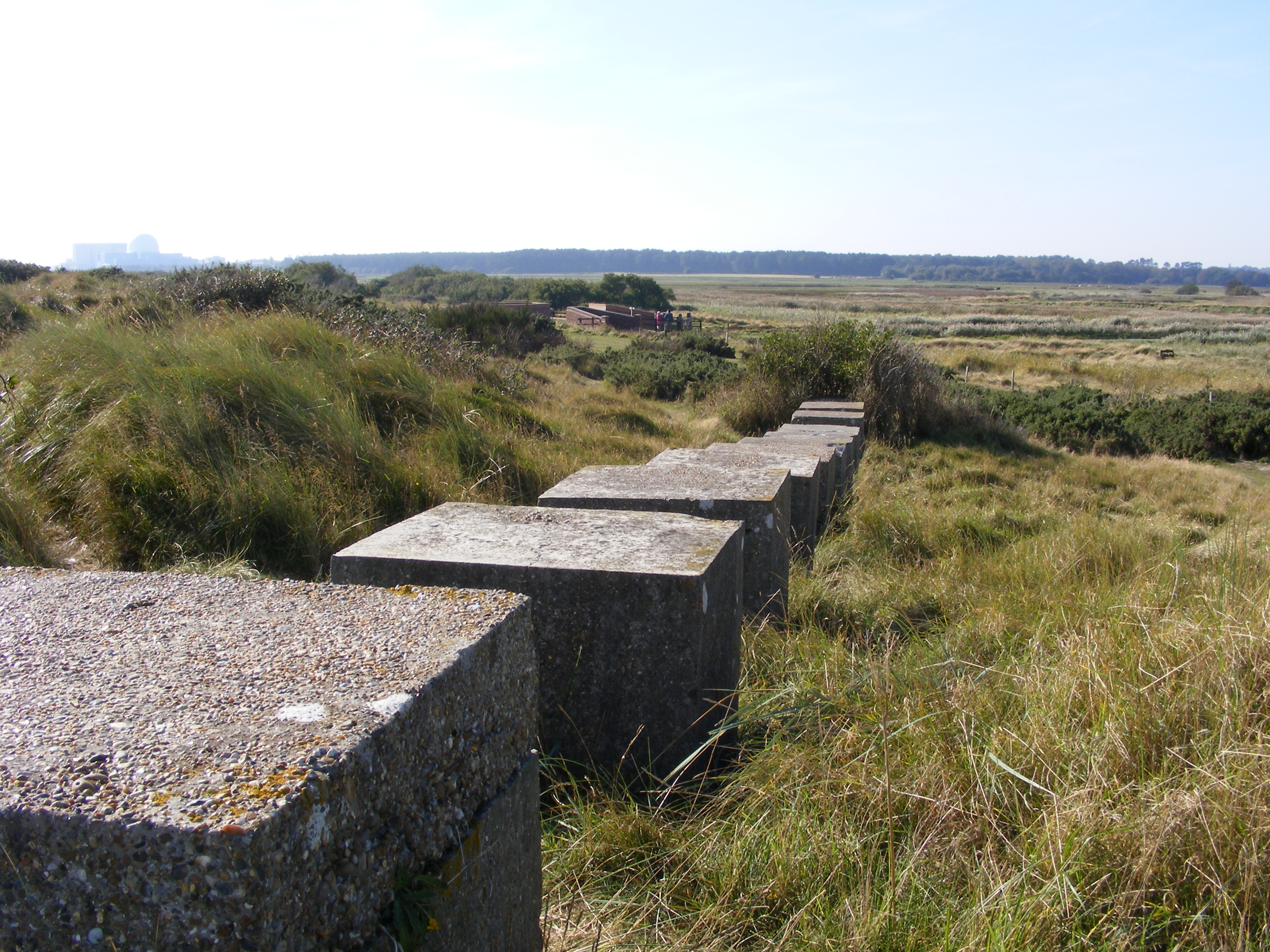
The beach with WW2 tank traps

In the Domesday Survey in 1086 Minsmere was known as Menesmara or Milsemere. It is recorded as having six households headed by freemen with one plough team. The manor, which was in the Hundred of Blythling, was held by Roger Bigot.

Ranulf de Glanvill, King Henry II's Lord Chief Justice, founded a Premonstratensian abbey on the marshes at Minsmere in 1182. The area was embanked to protect the abbey from the sea and to reclaim farmland, but still suffered several years of severe flooding in the 14th century. The site was abandoned in 1363, and the stone from the buildings was used to rebuild Leiston Abbey at a new location 3.3 kilometres (2.1 mi) further inland. The remains of the abbey church, fish pond and other buildings can still be detected below ground, but the only visible structure is the ruined chapel of St Mary, built within the nave of the former church. The lower section of the chapel was built soon after the demolition of the abbey in 1363, and the brick upper parts are thought to have been added by former abbot John Green, who lived there as a hermit when he retired from his post in 1527. The site was abandoned in 1537 during the Dissolution of the Monasteries, the only further construction being a pillbox that was built inside the chapel during World War II. The ruins are a scheduled monument of national importance.

Peat cutting took place at Minsmere from at least the 12th century, and a 1237 description of the coastline describes Minsmere as a port. In a survey of 1587, an early Tudor period artillery battery, constructed sometime after 1539 at Minsmere, was in ruins; the survey recommended that it be rebuilt. A coastguard station operated at Minsmere in the 1840s in an attempt to control smuggling along this stretch of the coast.

In about 1780 a sandbank closed the mouth of the Minsmere River, creating a large freshwater wetland on its inland side. The reeds that grew there were cut for thatching, and access was improved by using sand from the higher alluvial areas to build tracks across the marshes. These marshes were enclosed and drained for agricultural use in 1812 and 1813, following the passing of the relevant Act in 1810, with the main sluice being built to control drainage to the sea. The New Cut, a canal south of the river, was built as part of the drainage works, joining the river again at the sea sluice. The canal was used to transport the thatch crop inland by barge, its bridges being built particularly high to enable the bulky cargo to pass beneath. The drainage was improved after 1846 using steam-powered pumps. These were made by Richard Garrett & Sons of the Leiston Iron Works.

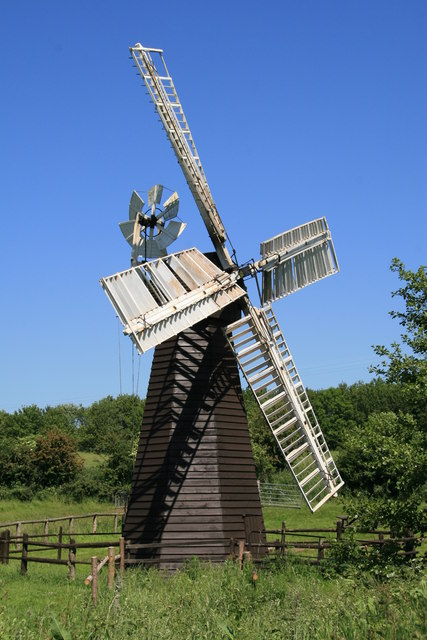
The Eastbridge Windpump at the Museum of East Anglian Life, Stowmarket.

There were four windmill sites on the levels. The Eastbridge Windpump was a smock mill built in the mid-19th century, probably by the millwright Robert Martin of Beccles. It stood north of the New Cut. The mill worked a three throw pump with square pistons. The windpump was working until 1939 and collapsed in February 1977. The remains were rescued by the Suffolk Mills Group in July 1977 and the mill was rebuilt at the Museum of East Anglian Life in Stowmarket in the early 1980s. The Sea Wall Mill stood north of the New Cut but closer to the coast than the Eastbridge Windpump. It was a smock mill built in the early 19th century. The mill worked by wind until it was tailwinded in January 1935, breaking the windshaft and rendering the mill sail-less. The scoopwheel was subsequently worked by a Hupmobile petrol engine, and later by a diesel engine. The mill collapsed in the summer of 1976. A third smock mill stood south of the New Cut and seaward of the ruins of the chapel. Built by the millwright Collins of Melton, it was blown down in the 1920s and a Titt windpump was erected on the site to drive the scoopwheel. This windpump had sails 4.9 metres (16 ft) diameter. Another Titt windpump, with sails 7.6 metres (25 ft) diameter stood 1.6 km (a mile) south of this. Both Titt windpumps were standing in 1938.

The levels were re-flooded during World War II to defend against invasion along the East Anglian coast. Military defences were built at Minsmere and neighbouring Dunwich, including pillboxes, anti-aircraft defences, anti-tank blocks and barbed wire defence lines. The Army also used much of the heathland for military manoeuvres, including preparations for the invasion of continental Europe.

Before the war, the Ogilvie family had owned and managed the area as farmland and as a shooting estate, planting many deciduous trees as part of their hunting management plan. After the war, they decided to leave the marshes undrained, realising their ornithological value.

=== RSPB era ===
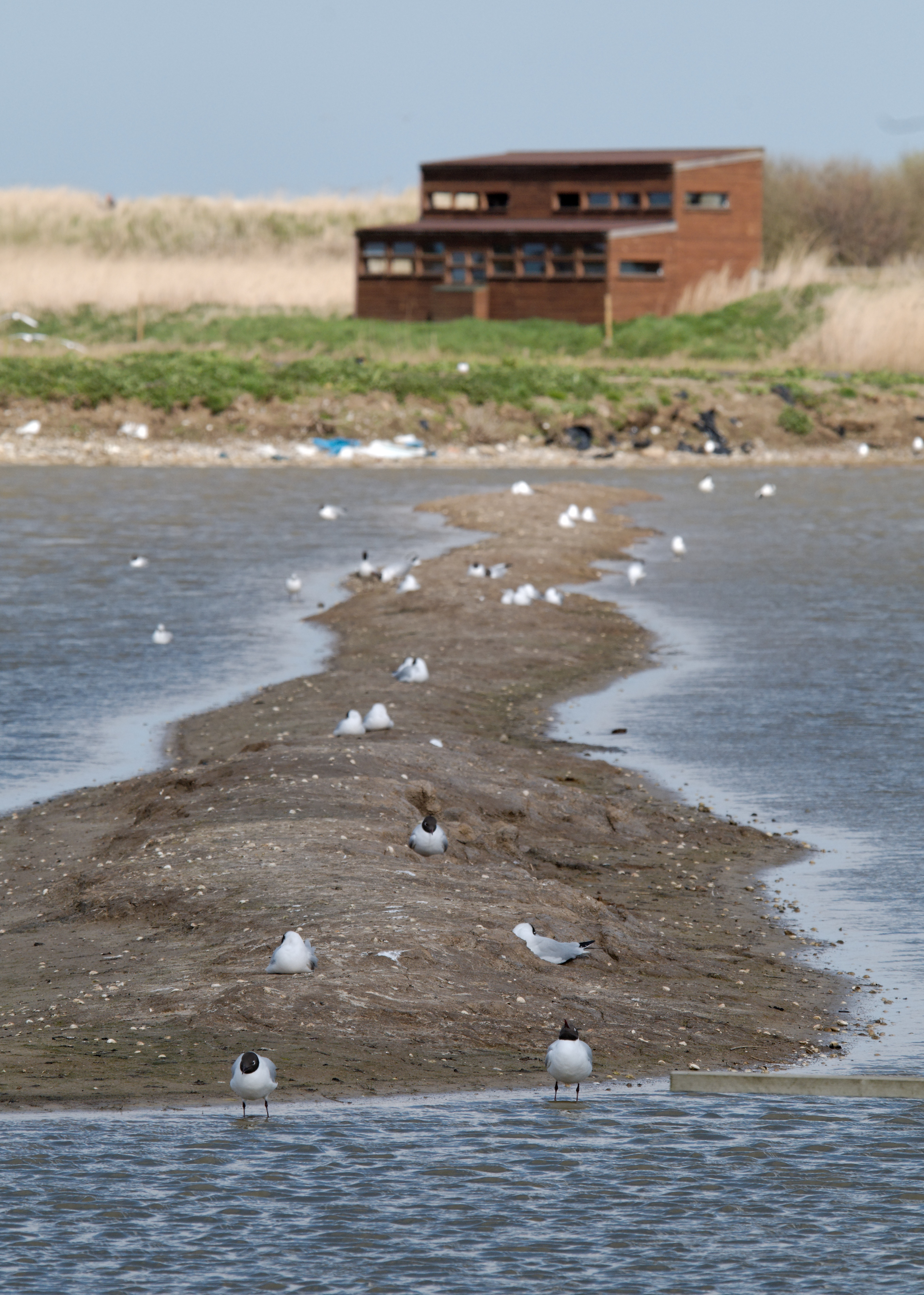
A bird hide overlooking the scrape, with black-headed gulls in the foreground

The RSPB had been considering the Minsmere site, at that time about 600 hectares (1,500 acres) in extent, as a potential reserve from the late 1930s, and a management agreement was signed in 1947. The appointment of Bert Axell as warden in 1959 led to major changes in reserve management, which were in due course also adopted elsewhere. He realised that ecological succession would eventually lead to the loss of important habitats, such as bare ground on the heaths or open water in the reed beds, unless natural plant colonisation was actively prevented. He created the "scrape", an area with shallow water, islands and bare mud, by lowering land levels and managing the water level with new sluices. A circular path led around the scrape, giving access to hides on each of the four sides. In 1977, two years after Axell's retirement, the RSPB purchased the reserve outright.

The Great Storm of 1987 destroyed 3,000 trees in one night. Many areas were reforested, but it was noticed that other badly affected woodlands nearby were colonised by woodlarks, so some recently acquired arable land was acidified and converted to heathland to encourage open-ground species.

Minsmere is one of a small number of UK sites at which bitterns breed. In 1979, nine booming (Note: In spring, a male bittern makes repeated loud booming calls to advertise his territory and attract females. The sound is amplified in the air-filled oesophagus, which acts as a soundboard.) males were counted but the population at Minsmere has varied over time, reaching a low of only one booming male in 1991. During the 1990s the existing reed beds were managed specifically for bitterns; when grazing marshes known as the North and South Levels were purchased, the North Levels were converted to reed bed and the South Levels to wet grassland.

The Minsmere reserve covers about 1,000 hectares (2,500 acres) of reed bed, open water, lowland heath, grassland, scrub, woodland, dune and shingle vegetation. The nature reserve, its habitats and wildlife, are protected under UK law as part of Minsmere–Walberswick Heaths and Marshes, which is a Special Protection Area, a Ramsar Site, a Special Area of Conservation and a Site of Special Scientific Interest. The site is also included in the areas covered by the Suffolk Coast and Heaths Area of Outstanding Natural Beauty (AONB) and the Suffolk Heritage Coast.

== Access and facilities ==
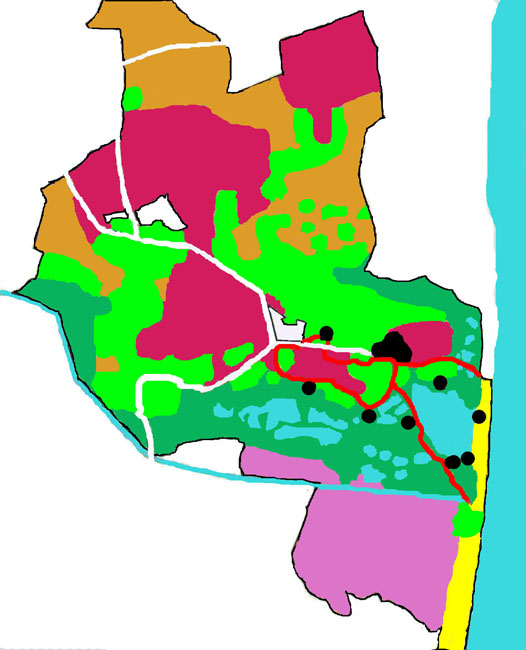
Simplified map of the reserve Woodland Acid grassland Sand Heath Wet grassland Reed bed Main visitor trail Car park-visitor centre-toilet complex and eight bird hides

The reserve is accessible by car from the A12 via the village of Westleton. It is also connected to Route 1 of the Sustrans National Cycle Network by the Suffolk Coast Cycle route. The nearest bus access is in the town of Leiston 6.5 kilometres (4.0 mi) away and rail access is in Darsham 8 kilometres (5.0 mi) distant. Coastlink, a demand responsive bus service, is available from these places to travel to the reserve but requires booking a day in advance. RSPB Minsmere is accessible on foot from Dunwich Heath, Sizewell Beach and Eastbridge, and there are 19 kilometres (12 mi) of public rights of way around the reserve. Two long-distance walks, the Suffolk Coast Path and the Sandlings Walk, also connect to Minsmere.

The reserve was originally conceived as a protected site for rare breeding birds, and before 1980 permits were needed to visit. Only since 2005 has Minsmere opened every day of the week. The visitor centre was built in 1996 and expanded in 2012 using National Lottery and European Union funding. Visitor access to the various habitats has also been improved. Entry to the reserve is free for RSPB members, although a fee is charged for non-members. The site is open daily from dawn to dusk, year-round. The visitor centre and facilities are open from 9 am to 5 pm with some seasonal variations. The visitor centre provides a café, picnic area, shop, toilets and baby-changing facilities; guided walks, binocular hire and children's 'explorer packs' are also available. Only assistance dogs are allowed within the reserve; all other dogs must be kept within the car park or visitor centre, or on the public rights of way that surround the site.

The reserve was featured in the BBC Birdwatch live TV broadcasts in 1980, 1981 and 1989, and on Springwatch from 2014 to 2016.

== Management ==
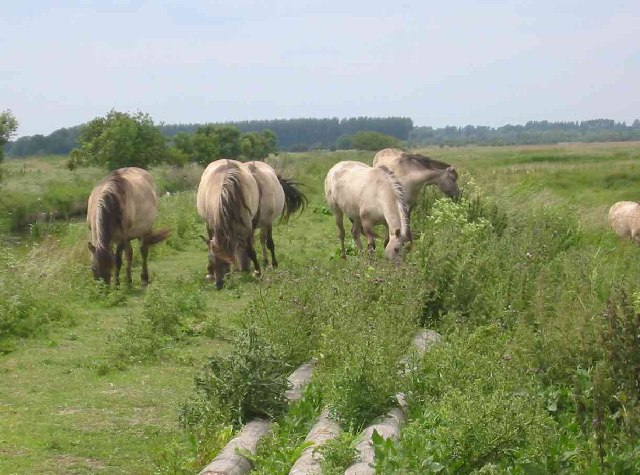
Konik horses grazing the reserve

The main management objectives at Minsmere are to maintain and improve the wetland, heath and grassland habitats. Water levels are managed using a system of sluices, surplus water eventually flowing into the sea at the main sluice on the New Cut. The sluices also keep seawater out of the reed beds, allowing control of salinity in the scrape. Vegetation is removed from the lagoons annually, and sections of the scrape are dried out and re-flooded on a five-year rotation. The scrape is protected from predators by an electric fence, improved in 2014 and 2015 when it was realised that badgers were attacking ground-nesting birds. The reed beds are grazed by Konik horses and Highland cattle while they are drained; this helps maintain the boundary between reed beds and open water areas. This control of reed density provides open water feeding pools for bitterns within the reed beds. The grazing regime was instituted following investigations into similar schemes in Sweden and Denmark.

The heathland and acidic grassland areas of Minsmere are managed by grazing, heather and scrub control and removal of trees and unwanted western gorse. The areas of gorse and scrub remaining are cut in rotation to keep the gorse short and dense, providing a scrub structure optimal for nightingales. In 1989, 158 hectares (390 acres) of arable land were purchased in a project to recreate lowland heath and acidic grassland habitat by acidification of the soil, the aim being to join fragmented patches of heathland together and to provide increased habitat for the stone-curlew, woodlark and nightjar, three threatened bird species. Methods used to acidify the land, which had been arable farmland for 150 years, included grazing by sheep or the addition of sulphur, either with bracken and heather waste, or on its own, followed by reseeding.

== Fauna and flora ==
Minsmere's large size and variety of different habitats, some of which are scarce elsewhere in the UK, make it attractive to many species of animals and plants; around 5800 species have been recorded on the reserve.

=== Birds ===
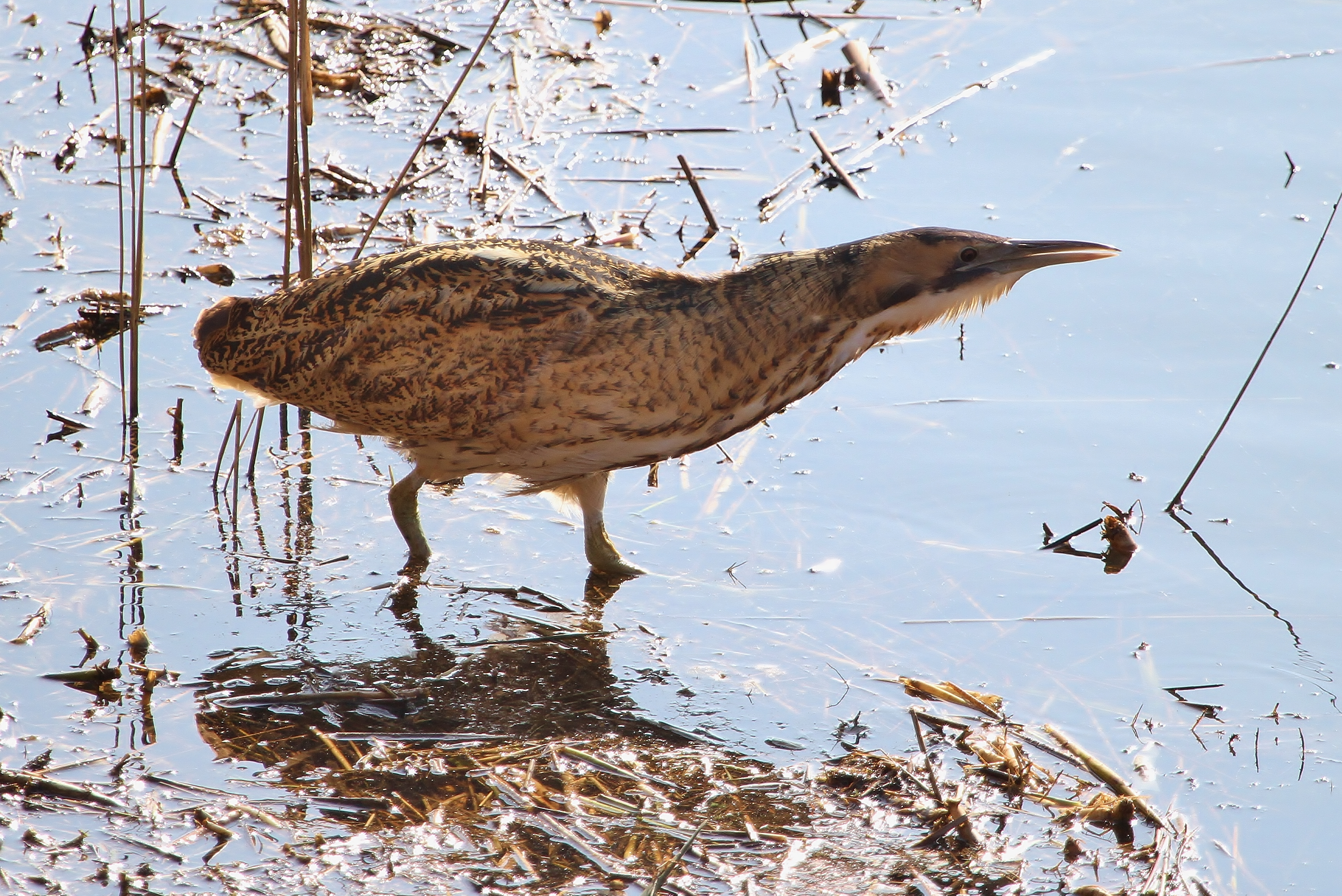
A bittern

As of 2017, 342 bird species have been sighted at Minsmere, of which 230 are annual and more than 100 have bred. In the 1990s the bittern was in serious decline with only one booming male on the reserve. Creation of ditches and pools and better water-level management led to 9–12 males being present annually, and application of these techniques elsewhere has revived the fortunes of this species in the UK as a whole. The stone curlew has also benefited from the creation of suitable bare-ground nesting habitat, and the reserve's population is now nearly 10 pairs each year, against a single pair in Suffolk in the mid-1990s. The avocet first started its recolonisation of Britain in 1947, four pairs breeding a month after the reserve was acquired by the RSPB. Numbers at Minsmere now vary between 40 and about 140 pairs per year.

In 1971, the only nesting pair of marsh harriers in the UK were at Minsmere. The population of this polygynous species reached 17 nesting females in 2007, up from the more typical 8 to 10. Other important species are bearded tits, woodlarks, nightjars in open habitats, nightingales in the woodlands, and Dartford warblers, which returned to Minsmere's heaths in the mid-1990s, having been lost to the area six decades earlier.

Many wildfowl winter on the reserve, including wigeon, gadwall and teal, and easterly winds can bring in passage migrants, sometimes in large numbers. These may include uncommon species such as bluethroats, wrynecks and dotterels.

Minsmere's east-coast location and range of habitats make it a major site for rare species. Notable recent occurrences include Great Britain's first western swamphen in 2016, a black-browed albatross in 2015, pallid harrier and collared pratincole in 2014, and Audouin's gull and red-flanked bluetail in 2011.

=== Other animals and plants ===
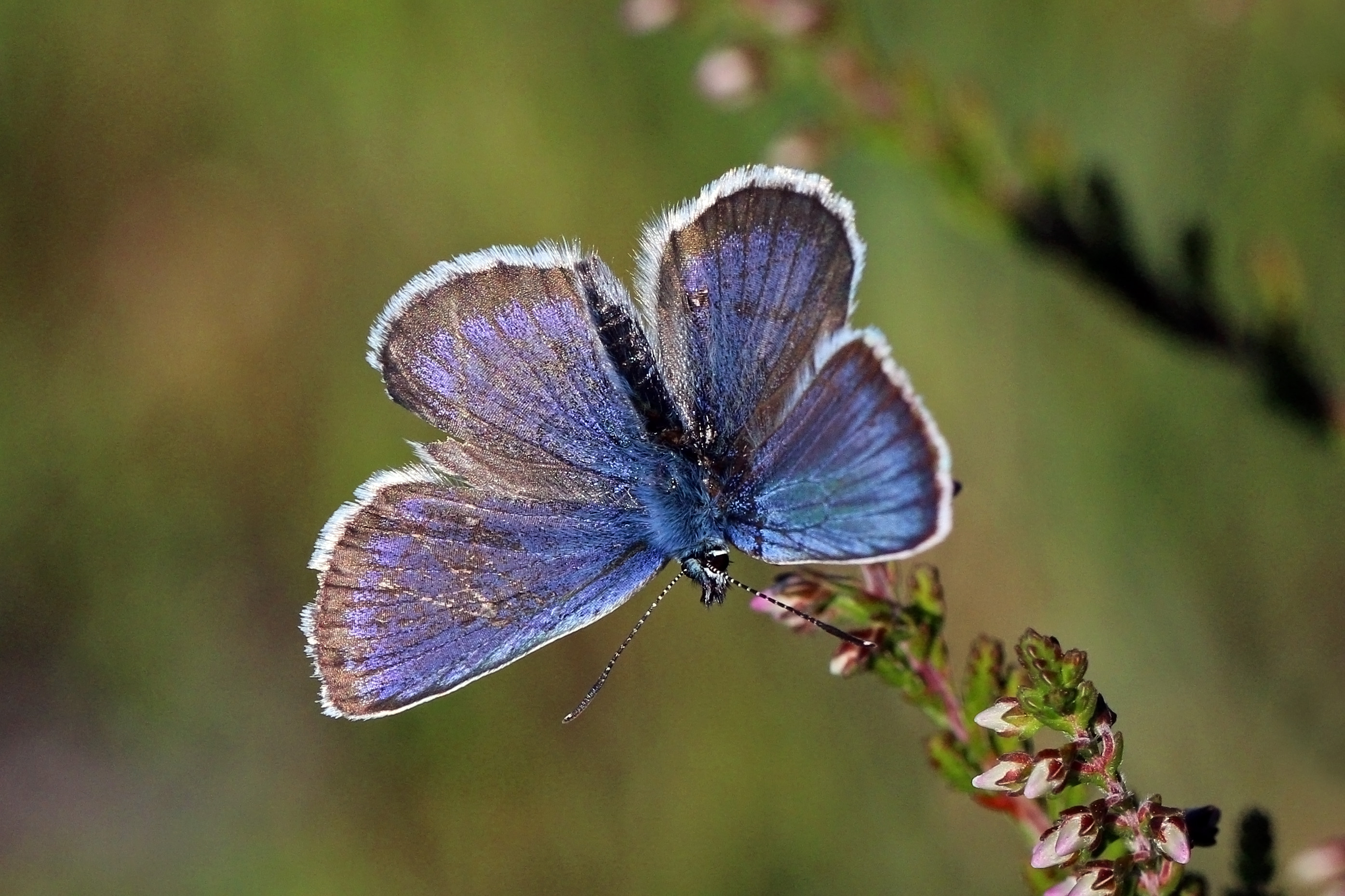
Male silver-studded blue butterfly

Mammals found at Minsmere include a herd of about 300 red deer, otters, badgers and water voles, the last being protected by active control of introduced American mink which have led to major declines elsewhere. Other vertebrates include adders, small numbers of natterjack toads and 13 species of fish, of which common rudd is an important food source for bitterns.

Over 1000 species of moths and butterflies have been found at Minsmere, including a large breeding population of the silver-studded blue. Rare species include the scarce tortoiseshell butterfly and Britain's only record of the moth species Catocala coniuncta, now given the English name of "Minsmere crimson underwing". Threatened moths include the flame wainscot, Fenn's wainscot and white-mantled wainscot. The reserve has been colonised by two insect species that are currently expanding their ranges, the European beewolf and the antlion, and it also hosts the hairy-legged mining bee and the minotaur beetle; the latter large insect is a food item for stone-curlews.

Dead and decaying trees in the woodlands support a wide range of invertebrates and over 1500 species of fungus, including rare species such as moor club, deceiving bolete and lion's mane mushroom. The shingle ridges on the beaches hold a variety of uncommon plants including yellow horned-poppy, red-tipped cudweed and round-leaved wintergreen.

== Threats ==
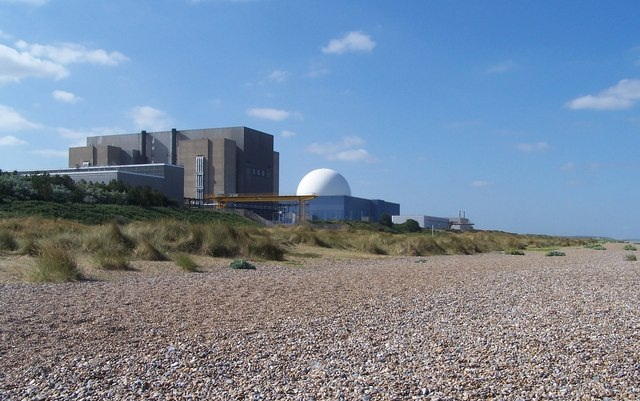
Expansion of Sizewell nuclear power stations may affect water levels at neighbouring Minsmere

The Suffolk coast has been subject to incursions from the sea for centuries, particularly notable events being the loss to the sea of most of the once-important town of Dunwich, next to Minsmere, in a series of storms in 1286, 1328 and 1347, and the 1953 storm which caused flooding and destruction in much of eastern England.

Minsmere faces threats from rising sea levels, caused by climate change, which adversely affect the drainage of the reserve and can lead to river flooding. Coastal erosion also threatens the integrity of the reserve. An Environment Agency assessment in 2011 estimated that Dunwich Heath, the beach at Minsmere and the artificial clay bank behind the beach could suffer severe damage within 20 years, although work by the Environment Agency at the north end of the reserve should hold the sea at bay there for 50 years.

The construction of two new reactors at the neighbouring Sizewell nuclear power site may also have a potential impact on the reserve. The RSPB and others have argued that the water table in the marshes could be adversely affected by the adjacent construction, both through contamination and by a change in water levels. There could also be changes to the coastline caused directly or indirectly by the actual construction.

An article written on behalf of the RSPB suggested that any damage to the wetlands at Minsmere is likely to have a major effect on UK bittern numbers since the reserve holds a significant proportion of the national breeding population. In 2018, expansion plans for Sizewell were called into question by National Infrastructure Commission proposals to scale back the nuclear power programme on safety and environmental grounds.
