= Regional Cycle Route 42 =

Cycle route in the United Kingdom

Regional Cycle Route 42 is a regional bicycling route in Suffolk, England, from Snape to Bramfield through the Suffolk Coast and Heaths, an Area of Outstanding Natural Beauty.

== Route ==
Snape | Friston | Knodishall | Eastbridge | Minsmere | Dunwich | Bramfield

Links to:

- RCR 41 just south of Snape
- NCR 1 just north of Bramfield

This route takes one through Suffolk Coast and Heaths, an Area of Outstanding Natural Beauty and close to Leiston Abbey, Dunwich Heath, Minsmere RSPB reserve, the historic village of Dunwich and the Suffolk Coast National Nature Reserve.

== See also ==
- Tourist Information from Visit Suffolk' about cyclings along the coast
- Discover Suffolk Coast and heaths
- Get Cycling in Suffolk
- Map from Sustrans
