= Guy Ferre =

Guy Ferre may refer to:

- Guy Ferre the Elder (died 1303)
- Guy Ferre the Younger (died 1323)
