= Minsmere River =

River in Suffolk, England

Minsmere
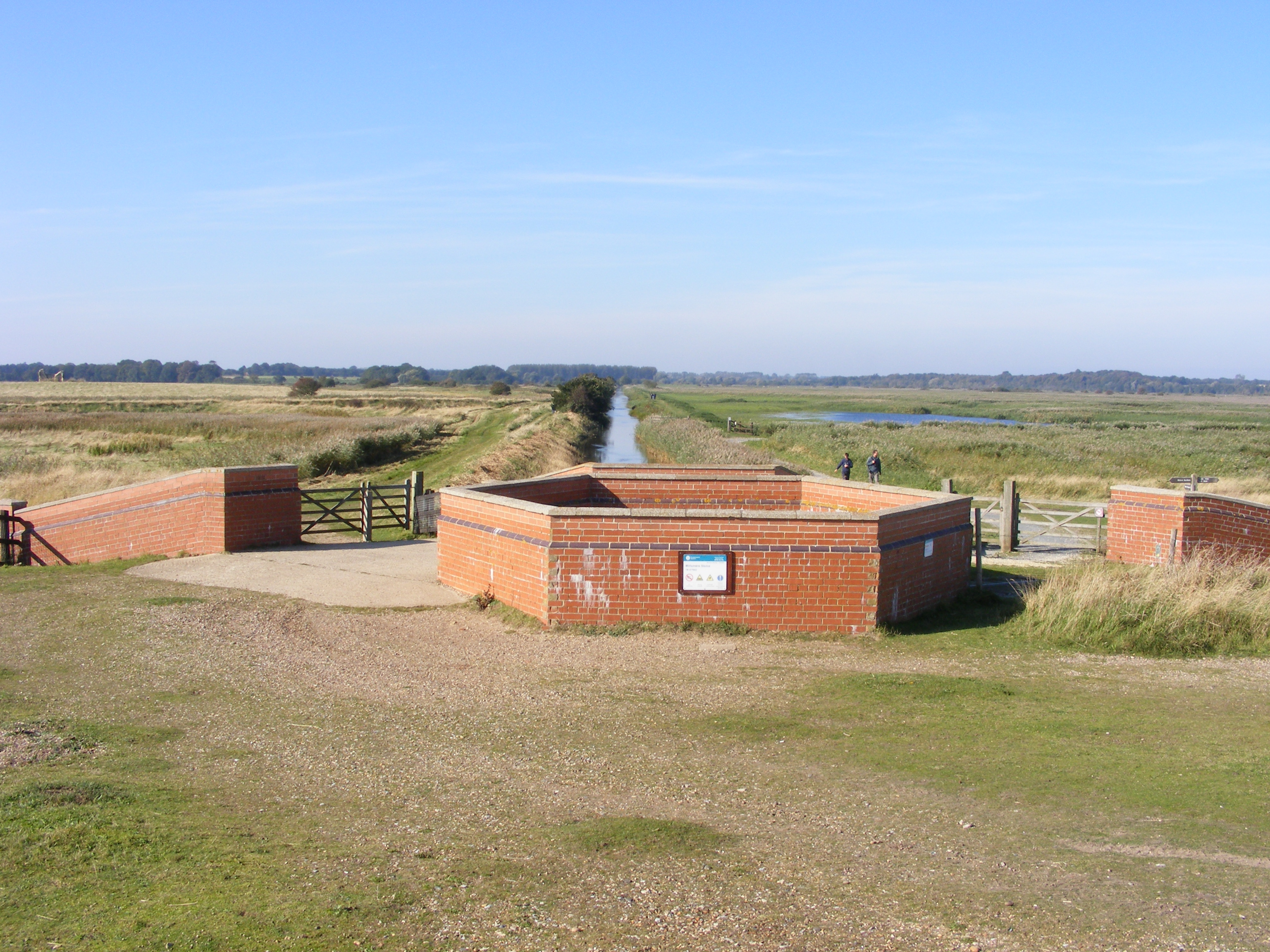
- Minsmere sluice at the seaward end of Minsmere New Cut

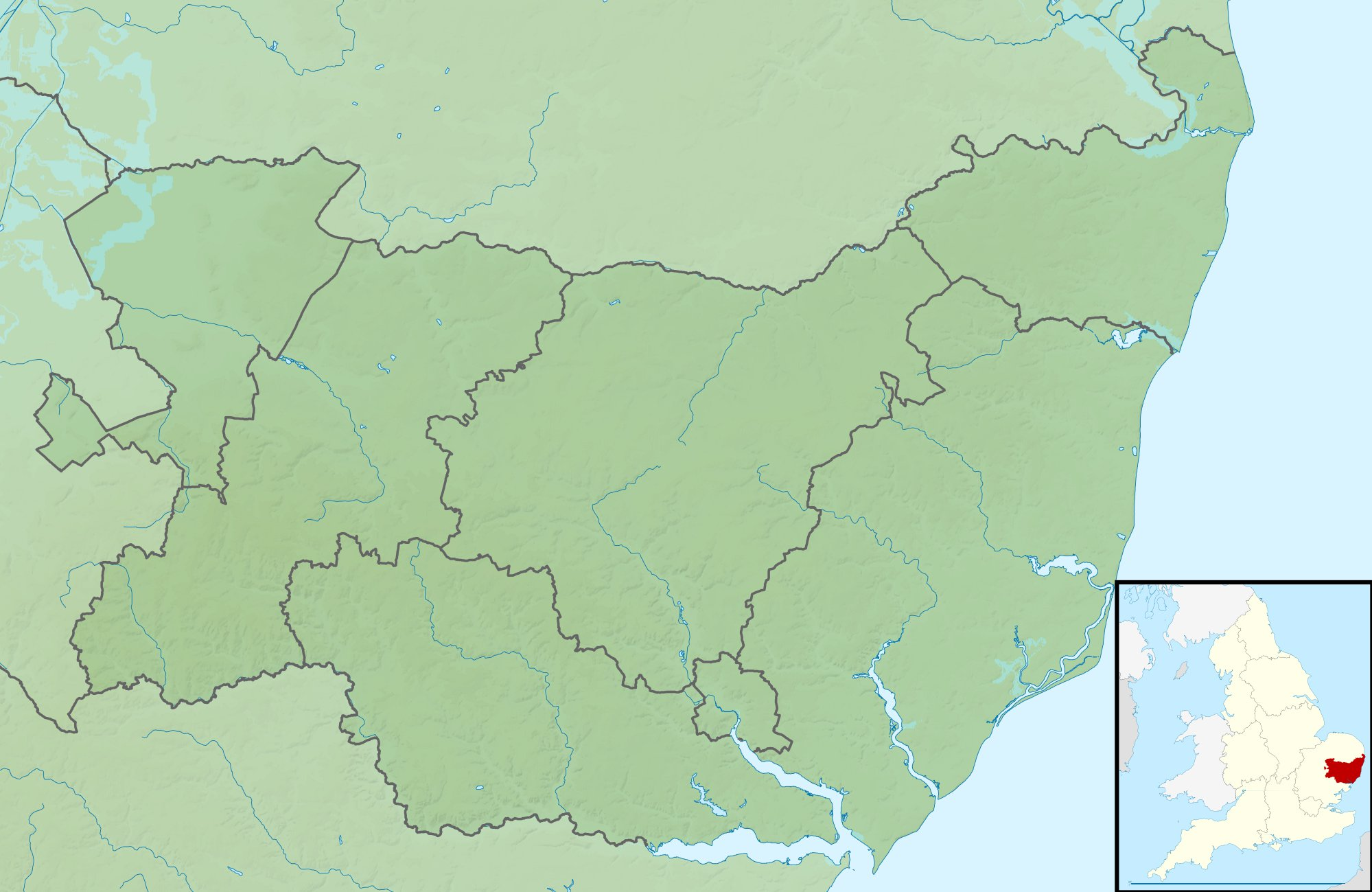
- Location of the river mouth within Suffolk

Location
- Country: England
- Region: Suffolk

Physical characteristics
- Source
  - location: Ubbeston parish
  - coordinates: 52.1551°N 0.7361°E
  - elevation: 52 m (171 ft)
- Mouth: North Sea
  - coordinates: 52.2373°N 1.6286°E
  - elevation: 0 m (0 ft)

Minsmere River is a river in the English county of Suffolk which flows into the North Sea at Minsmere. The river is formed from the River Yox at Yoxford before flowing through Middleton, Eastbridge and Minsmere. It flows to the south of Minsmere RSPB reserve helping to form many of the wetland habitats at the reserve.

The river valley was largely drained and used as agricultural land in the past. The original course of the river, the Minsmere Old River, runs to the north of the Minsmere New Cut, an artificial drainage channel built in 1812. This reaches the sea at Minsmere Sluice, a tidal sluice which discharges water from the channels into the sea.

== Flood defence work ==
A number of the drainage channels and river banks have been subject to flooding. Flood defence work has been carried out on the New Cut and associated sluices as well as at Reckford Bridge in Middleton.

== Landscape ==
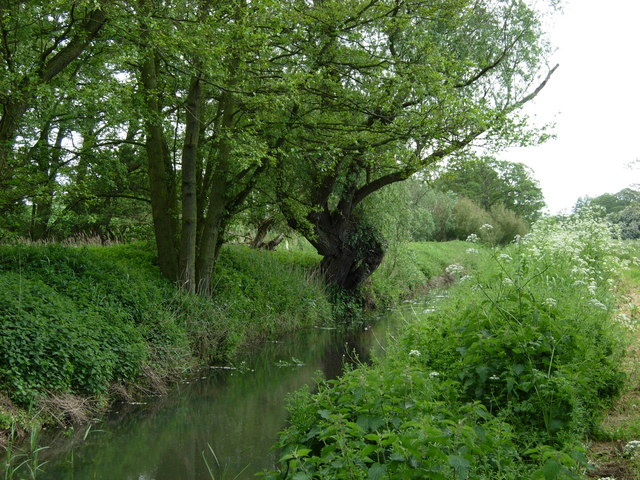
The river at Middleton

Between Yoxford and Eastbridge the landscape is classified as valley meadows and fens. The narrow valley, which has some peat deposits, is largely drained through a system of dykes and used as grassland with some areas of mixed woodland. Suffolk Wildlife Trust maintains a 20 hectares (49 acres) nature reserve at Darsham Marshes along this stretch of the river.

Past Eastbridge the landscape is largely flat along the line of the river. This is known as the Minsmere Level, an area of drained and re-flooded marshland with underlying alluvial geology. The area to the south of the Minsmere New Cut is used a grazing marsh. To the north the wetland areas are flooded and managed as part of the RSPB's habitat management strategy for its Minsmere reserve.

The area provides a number of important habitats for bitterns, marsh harriers, hen harriers, avocets and Dartford warblers. The wetland areas include flooded lagoons and much of the area is designated as a Ramsar site. The grazing marshes to the south of the Minsmere Levels provide overwintering grounds for a variety of different waterfowl species.

== Archaeology ==
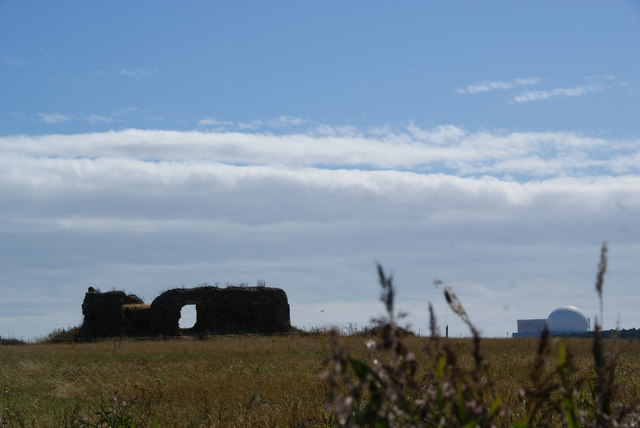
The ruined chapel of St Mary

The original site of Leiston Abbey stood to the south of the river on the Minsmere Levels. The remains of a chapel are the only visible remains at the site of the original Premonstratensian abbey which was moved to the current site near Leiston in 1363 due to increased flooding of the coastal site. The chapel was built after the abbey was moved and was used until the dissolution of the monasteries in 1536. It is a scheduled monument.

Eastbridge Windpump was one of four drainage mills which stood on the Minsmere Levels alongside the river. It is preserved at the Museum of East Anglian Life in Stowmarket.
