= Minsmere Levels =

Marshes in Suffolk, England

Minsmere Levels is made up marshes in the drainage basin on both sides of the Minsmere River from Sibton Lake past Yoxford, Reckford Bridge and Eastbridge via the New Cut and down through a sluice and out to the Sea.
