= Leiston Abbey =

Former abbey in Leiston, Suffolk

Coordinates: 52.2214°N 1.5776°E

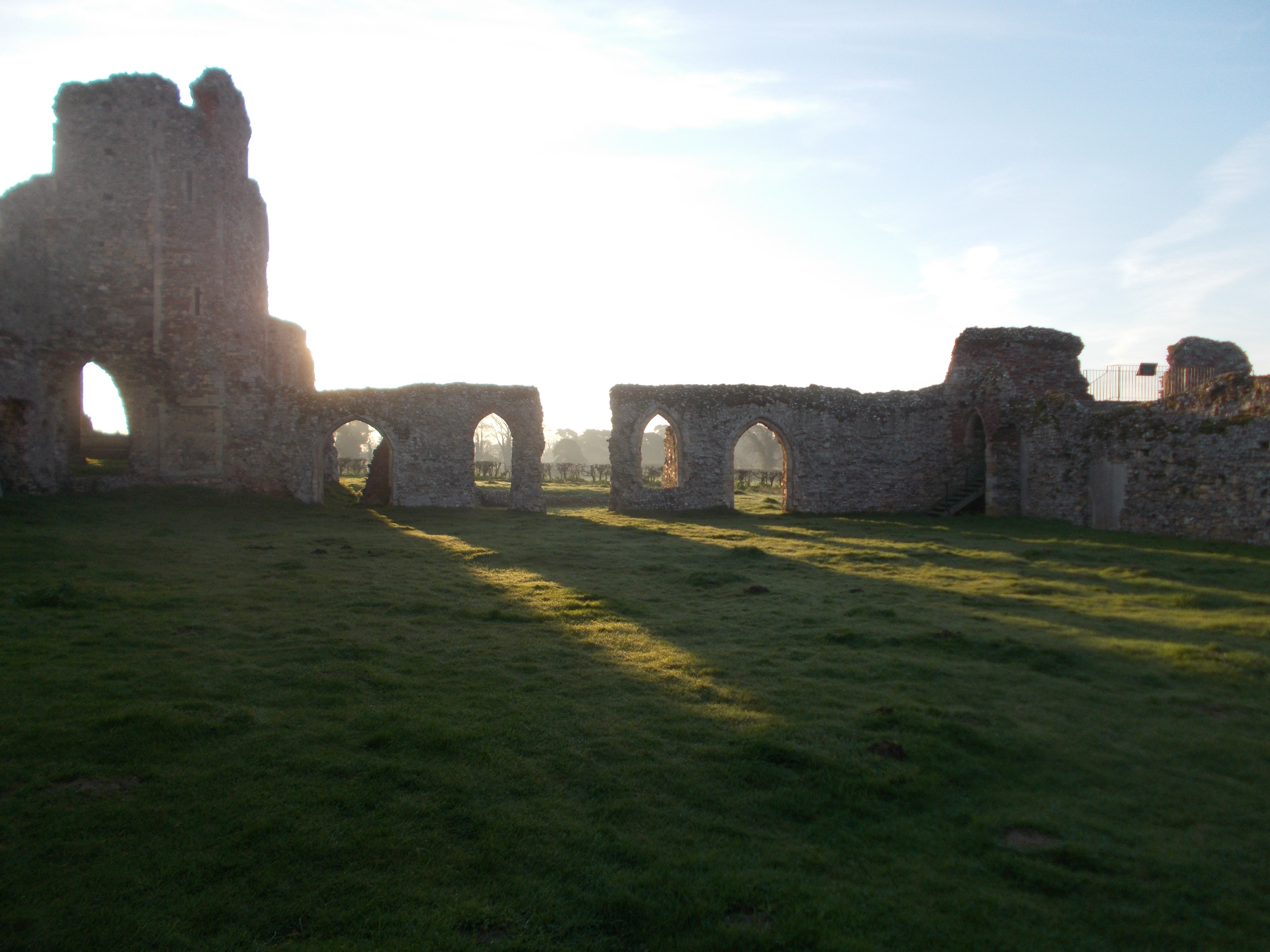
Leiston Abbey cloister garth at dawn

Leiston Abbey outside the town of Leiston, Suffolk, England, was a religious house of Canons Regular following the Premonstratensian rule (White canons), dedicated to St Mary. Founded in c. 1183 by Ranulf de Glanville (c. 1112-1190), Chief Justiciar to King Henry II (1180-1189), it was originally built on a marshland isle near the sea, and was called "St Mary de Insula". Around 1363 the abbey suffered so much from flooding that a new site was chosen and it was rebuilt further inland for its patron, Robert de Ufford, 1st Earl of Suffolk (1298-1369). However, there was a great fire in c. 1379 and further rebuilding was necessary.

The house was suppressed in 1537. A Cartulary or monastic register survives. The Abbey's annual rolls of their court of wreck from 1378 to 1481 are a most important historical resource. A series of late visitations, and a list of abbots, are in Premonstratensian records.

The impressive remains of the second abbey stand in the fields to the west of the road going north out of Leiston towards Theberton. After the Abbey was closed the estate was granted to Charles Brandon, 1st Duke of Suffolk. The Abbey became a farm, the farmhouse being built into the abbey walls. A Georgian frontage was added to the house, which was extended in the 1920s. In 1928 the ruins and farm were bought by Ellen Wrightson for use as a religious retreat. At her death in 1946 she bequeathed the house, ruins, land and buildings to the Diocese of St Edmundsbury and Ipswich. It was purchased in 1977 to become the home of the Pro Corda Trust, a centre for the specialized education and training of chamber musicians. The site is managed by them, and is in the guardianship of English Heritage.

== History ==
=== The old abbey ===
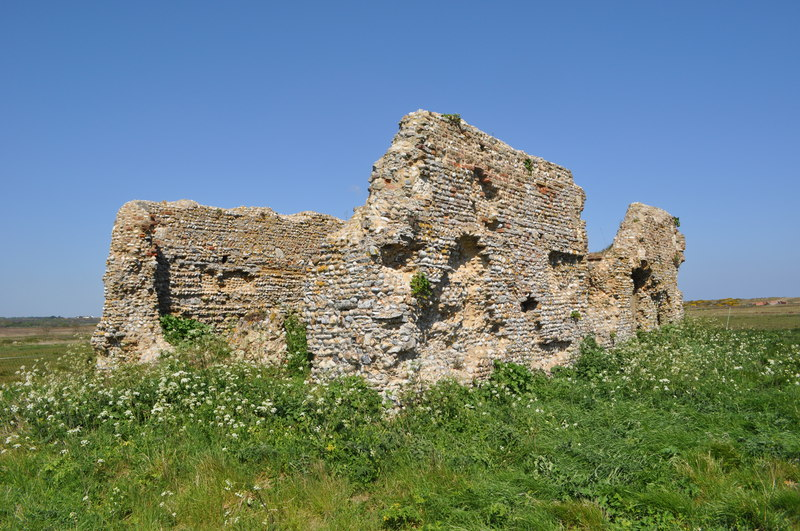
The chapel ruins at Minsmere on the Suffolk coast

Ranulf de Glanville, who was born at Stratford St Andrew, married Bertha, daughter of Theobald de Valoines, Lord of Parham. In 1171 he founded the Priory of Augustinian canons at Butley, a few miles south of Leiston, on lands settled upon his wife by her father as a marriage endowment. The Premonstratensian house of Leiston ("Leystone") Abbey was planned less than a decade later, and a received date for its foundation was 1183. Close ties existed between the two houses, and with the Augustinian nuns at Campsey Priory, a de Valoines foundation established shortly before 1195.

The site of the Leiston old abbey is identified with that of a ruined chapel at Minsmere, which stands near the sea on a marsh-girt island approached by a causeway from Eastbridge. This belief, long uncertain, gained support from aerial photography which appeared to show cropmarks suggesting an extensive complex there. It has since been shown that the chapel was not part of the original abbey, but was constructed on the site of the original monastery church soon after its removal in 1363. The suggestion was made by Alfred Suckling in 1848 that Ranulf may have chosen a site which had been used for religious purposes in Anglo-Saxon times.

==== Foundation ====
Before 1179 (in the presence of Richard de Luci) Henry II granted to Ranulf the manor of Leiston. He sought advice from the abbot of Welbeck Abbey, Nottinghamshire (a Premonstratensian house founded in 1140), who with the king's support visited Prémontré Abbey to obtain permission for Robert, abbot of Durford Abbey near Rogate, Sussex (founded from Welbeck after 1161), to transfer to Ranulf's abbey at Leiston. Robert borrowed canons from both Durford and Welbeck, apparently because Ranulf did not wish Leiston to owe any exaction to a senior house. One of these laid out the site over the course of two months. The manor of Leiston was confirmed to the canons by Pope Lucius III, and royal confirmation of the foundation was granted early in 1185, at which time the abbey church was already built. In this process Leiston Abbey exchanged its church of Knodishall for those of Aldringham and Leiston, formerly held by Butley Priory. An extensive series of foundation charters exists, including the confirmation by Archbishop Hubert Walter, Ranulf's nephew, of a Privilege of Pope Celestine III, granting, among many other rights, that of the free election of their abbot.

==== Descent of patronage, 1190-1351 ====
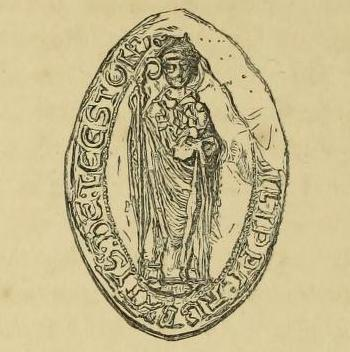
Seal of Abbot Philip of Leiston (fl. 1215)

In these and subsequent grants and confirmations Ranulf's family took part as witnesses and grantors, the de Valoines and Walters, the Glanvilles, and the families of his sons-in-law, the de Aubervilles, the de Ardenes and the fitz Ralphs. Roger de Glanvill granted the church at Middleton and William de Valoines that of St Botolph at Culpho. Ranulf died at the Siege of Acre in 1190, and the patronage of Leiston Abbey and of Butley Priory, with the manor of Benhall, passed to his daughter Matilda (Maud), wife of William de Auberville the elder, of Westenhanger, Kent, justiciar and knight in the fee of Simon de Averenches. In 1192 William and Matilda founded the Premonstratensian house of Langdon Abbey, at West Langdon in Kent, as from Leiston Abbey: the act was given under the hand of Abbot Robert of Leiston and witnessed by Gilbert, Prior of Butley. Patronage descended with Benhall to Matilda's son Hugh de Auberville, whose brother Robert de Auberville was a benefactor of Robertsbridge Abbey, and to Hugh's son William de Auberville the younger (died 1248). This William's attempt to assert rights of advowson at Butley Priory was stoutly and successfully resisted.

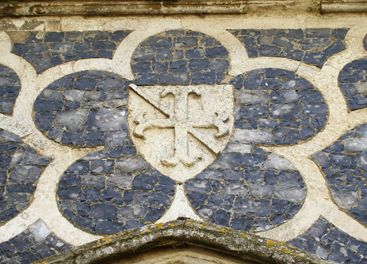
Arms of Guy Ferre the younger at Butley Priory Gatehouse

Titular patronage passed with Benhall manor to William's daughter Joan de Auberville and her second husband Nicholas de Crioll of Croxton Kerrial (died 1272). Nicholas gave Benhall to his son Nicholas, who married Margery, daughter of Gilbert Pecche (patron of Barnwell Priory, died 1291), and settled Benhall upon her as a lifetime dower by agreement between their fathers. In 1290 the younger Nicholas conveyed Benhall to Guy Ferre the younger, a transaction inspected and confirmed by Edward I in June 1294. However, Nicholas de Crioll dying in 1303, Margery was granted licence to remarry, and in 1303-04 Benhall was again conveyed to Guy Ferre. The identities of Guy Ferre the elder and younger, perhaps uncle and nephew, in stewardship to Eleanor of Provence, as "magister" to Edward of Carnarvon, and in King Edward I's service in Gascony, are in places hard to discriminate. The elder probably died in 1303.

The younger Guy Ferre and Gilbert Pecche (half-brother of Margery) both served as Edward II's Seneschals in Gascony. In 1312 Gilbert Pecche, knight, granted lands at Hacheston, Glevering, Easton, Wickham Market, Pettaugh and Framsden to Leiston Abbey. De Ferre died in 1323 holding many manors: but only Benhall, which he held jointly with his wife Eleanor (as of the Honour of Eye), remained to her for her lifetime. In 1334 she objected (unsuccessfully) to an election at Butley Priory. In 1337 the king granted the reversion of the manor to Robert de Ufford and his heirs, upon his creation as Earl of Suffolk, and it came to him when Eleanor died in 1349. In 1351, by a special patent, the king confirmed that the Earl of Suffolk held the advowson of "the priory of Leystone, now called the abbey of Leystone" with the manor of Benhall (as formerly held by de Criol and de Ferre), even though it had not been mentioned specifically in the grant of reversion.

=== The later abbey ===
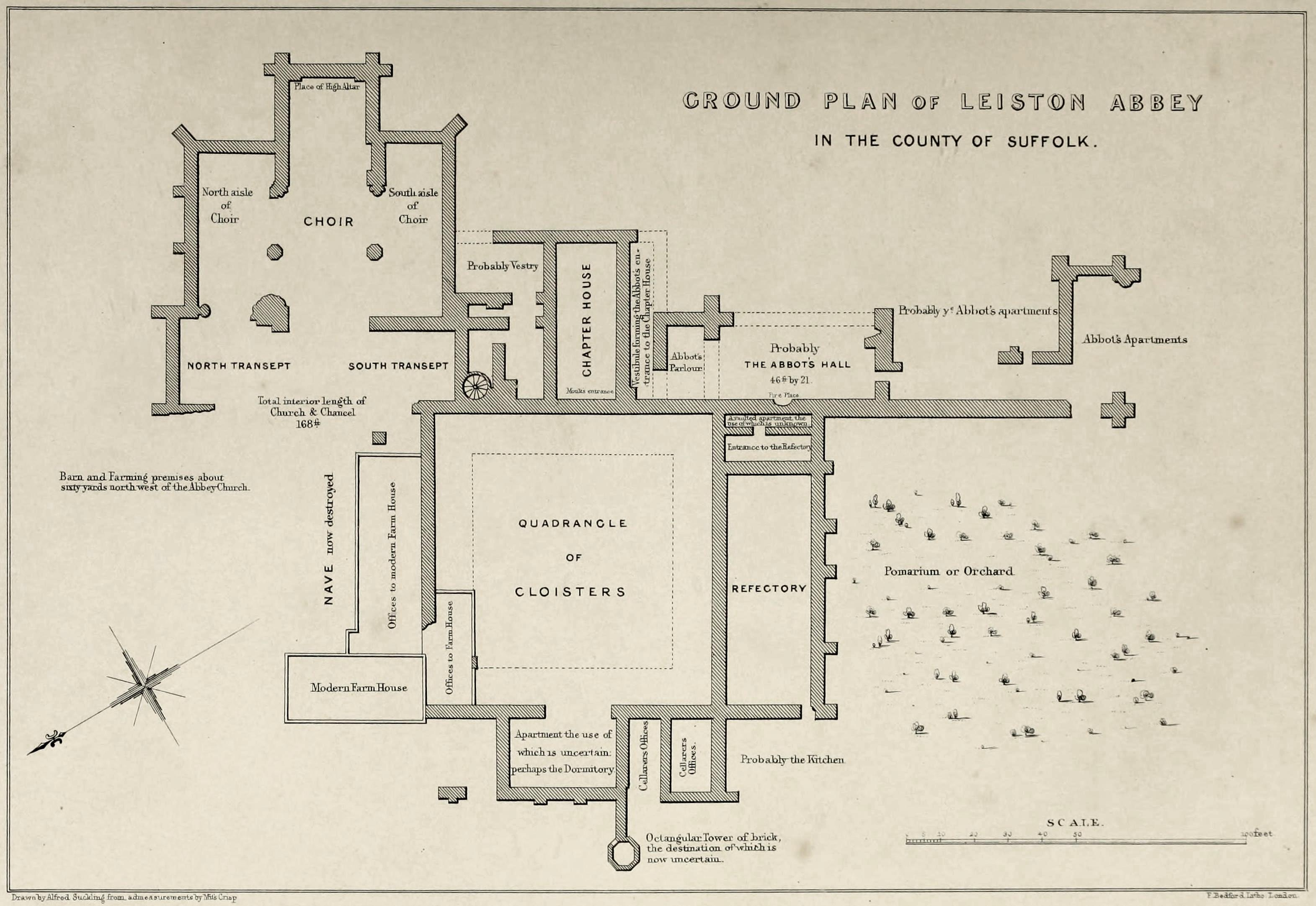
Ground-plan of Leiston Abbey ruins made by Alfred Suckling (1848)

In November 1362 the abbot and convent obtained royal licence to rebuild their abbey in a safer place. The existing buildings near the sea faced ruin, having been "destroyed and drowned by flooding of the sea", and could not be repaired because the foundations were compromised. Robert de Ufford was mindful of his family interest as a de Valoines (and de Pecche) descendant: his brother Ralph, of the third Ufford generation to serve as Justiciar of Ireland, was buried at Campsey Priory in 1346. The site now occupied by the abbey ruins at Leiston was chosen (some two-and-a-half miles west of the other), the plan of a new and splendid abbey was laid out, and construction began. Earl Robert died in 1369, and was buried beside his countess at Campsey Priory.

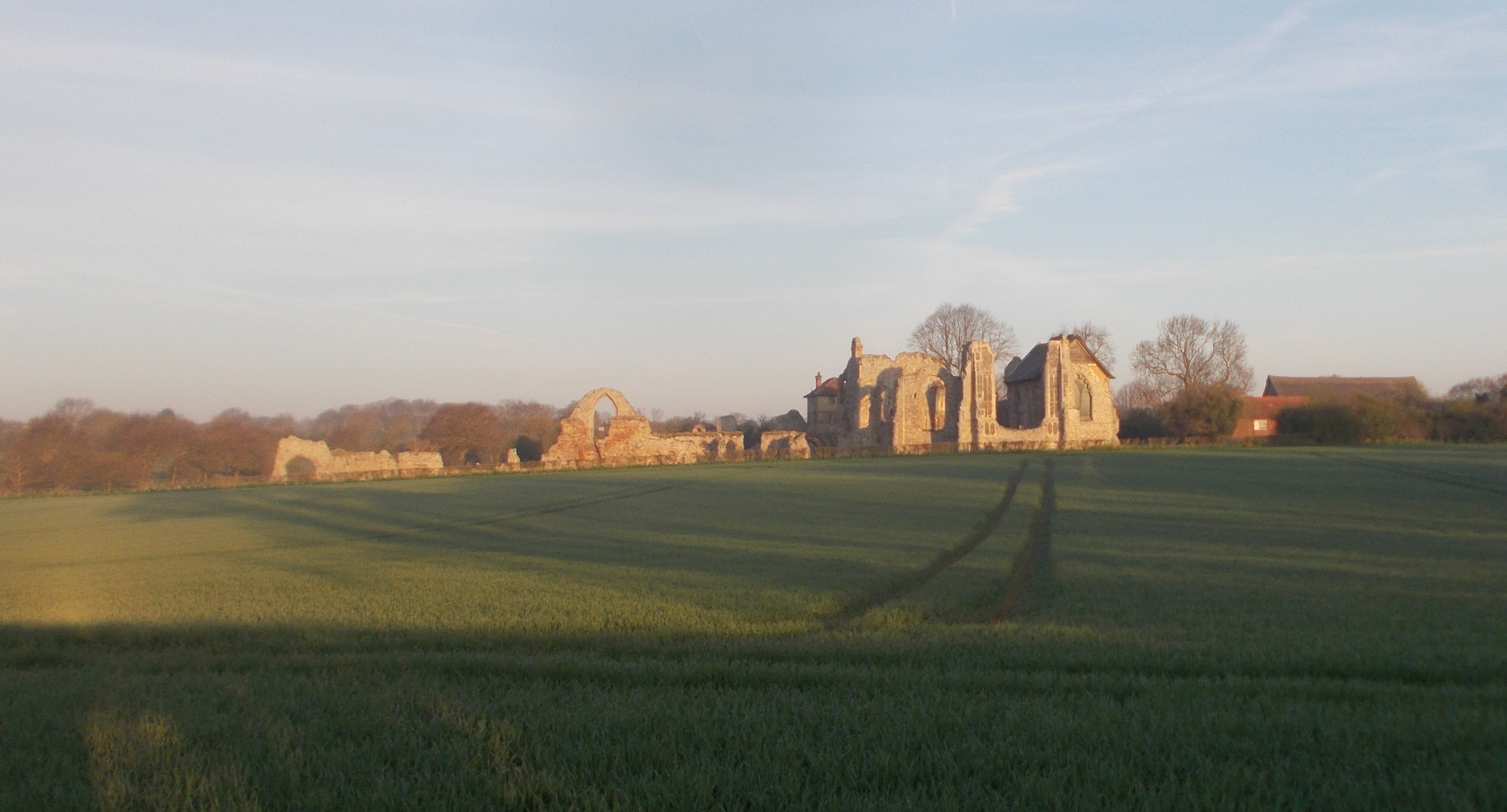
The south-east frontage of the abbey ruins at Leiston

The title and associated estates passed to his son William de Ufford. It was in or shortly before 1380 that, having been withdrawn from the ravages of the sea, the entire newly built monastery apart from its church was destroyed by fire, together with their corn and other goods. (Traces of this may be represented by areas of reddening in the surviving fabric.) The Abbot and convent were obliged to petition for a writ of supersedeas for distraint of the tenth, being thrown completely into debt and deprived of subsistence, and were granted this relief. Whether this fire was a harbinger of the Peasants' Revolt in East Anglia in 1381, or the result of accidental causes, is not reported. William de Ufford was certainly vigorous in suppressing that destructive uprising, but died suddenly without heir in 1382 and was buried at Campsey Priory. In the wake of the fire the last major rebuilding took place: the Earl's will, written 12 June 1381, left 500 marks to Leiston Abbey.

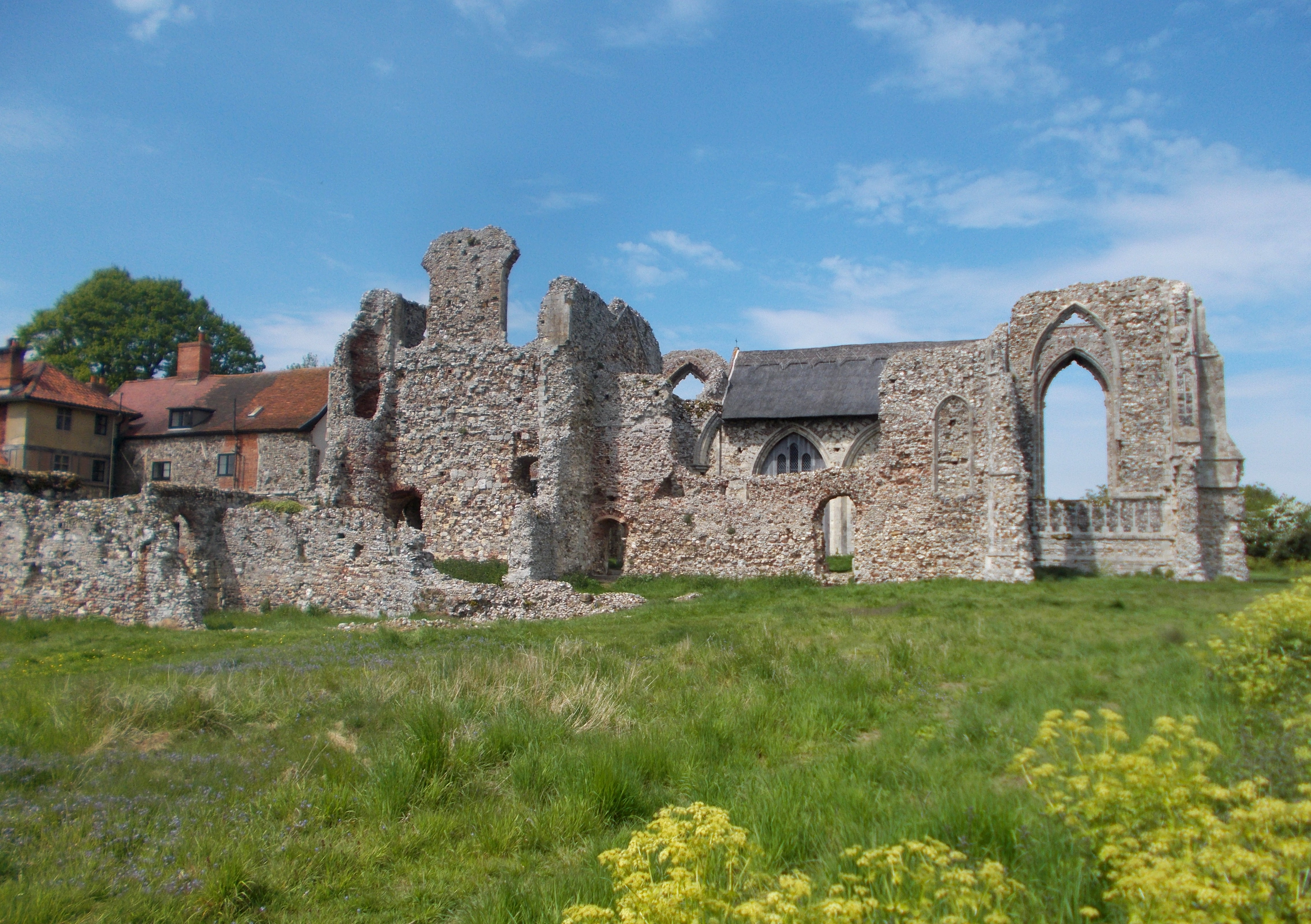
Ruins of the chapter house, south transept and presbytery, from the south

After escheat to the Crown, in 1385 the dignity and estates (including the advowson of Leiston Abbey) were bestowed upon Michael de la Pole, an intimate friend of King Richard II, who was accused of treason by the Lords Appellant in 1387 and fled into exile before February 1388. Having repossessed de la Pole's estates, in August 1388 King Richard confirmed to the abbot and convent all their existing rights and possessions, reinstating their right to elect their own superiors without reference to the king or any other patron, and granting immunity from the seizure of their possessions during any vacancy and from any obligation to pay a pension or corrody to anyone. The advowson was regranted to Michael de la Pole the younger in 1398.

The plan of the ruins taken by Alfred Suckling in 1848 provides an outline of walls still surviving, which can be recognized in views made by Samuel and Nathaniel Buck (1738), Thomas Hearne (engraved 1781), Henry Davy and others. The "ritual east" of the monastery was orientated somewhat to the south-east geographically. Suckling's plan is described as "entirely inadequate" by Sir Alfred Clapham, whose studies of Premonstratensian architecture laid the basis of modern interpretation.

==== The ruins ====
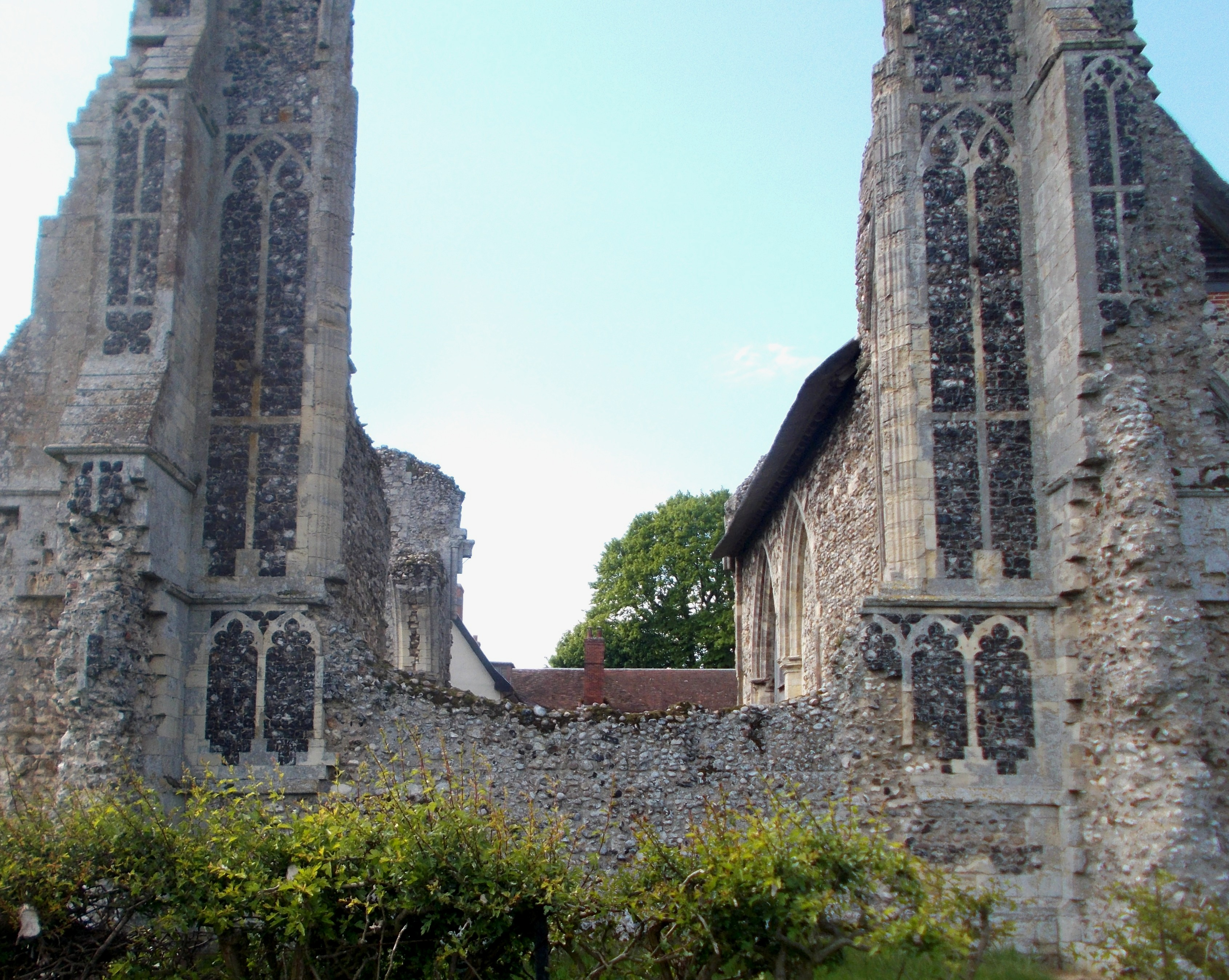
Blind flushwork tracery on the east front of Leiston Abbey church

The remains of the abbey church confirm that it survived the fire of 1380, and show that it was built on an impressive scale. It was laid out with an aisled nave, a central transept crossing supporting a tower, and a presbytery to the east with choir aisles serving as chapels both north (Our Lady) and south (St Michael). The proportions are indicated by the high north wall of the north transept containing the arch of a window 45 feet high, while the length of the church is estimated at 165 feet. The choir aisles, not occupying the full breadth of the transepts, opened into them by a single arch to the west and into the presbytery by two arches supported by columns or half-columns of octagonal section. Their separately pitched roofs are shown by gabled offsets on the east walls of the transepts. Their altar-spaces and eastern walls were closed from the presbytery, which extended beyond by a single bay where the altar was lit by tall arched windows on either side and by a great east window.

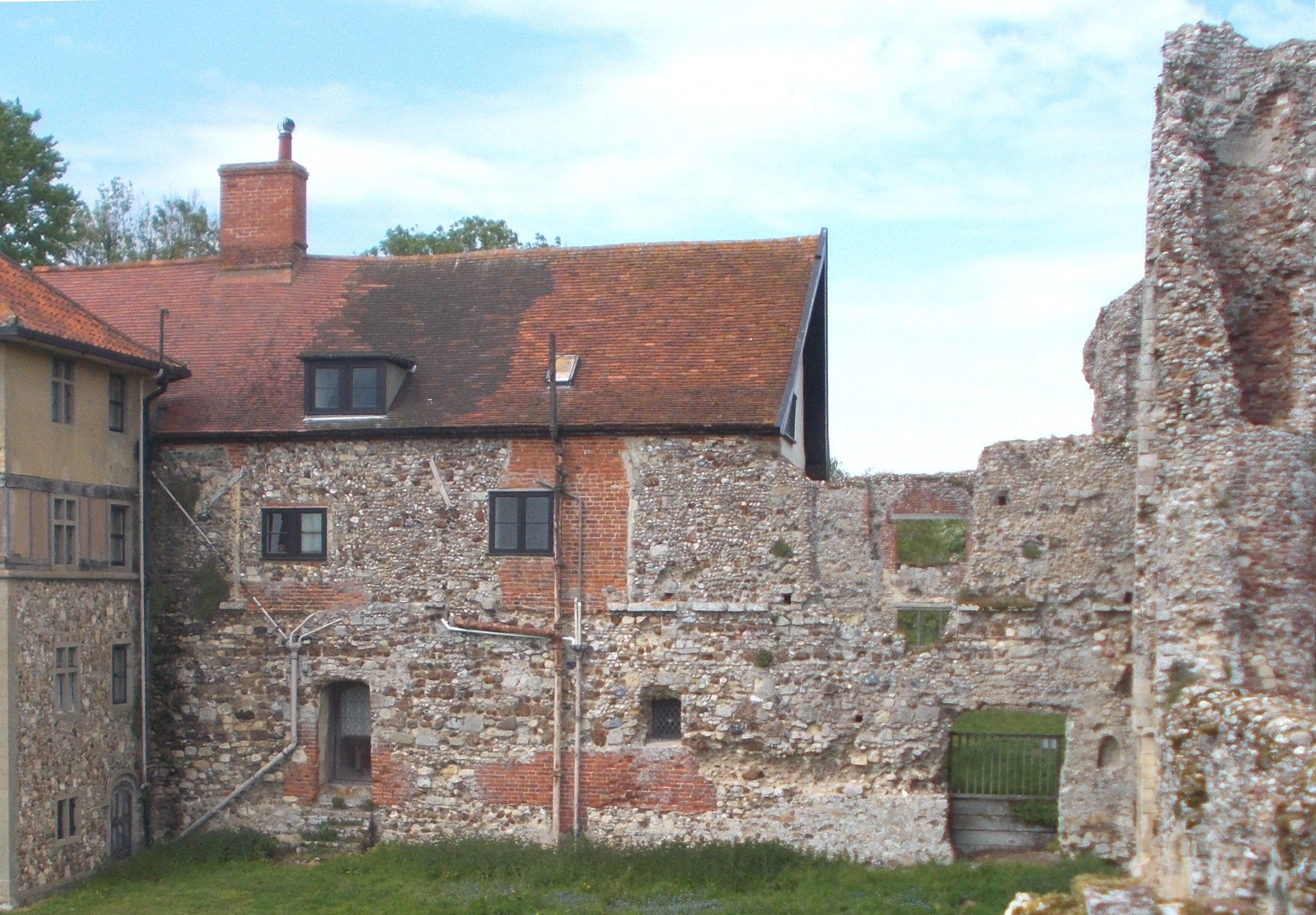
The south aisle wall (exterior), from the cloister

Externally the east wall and buttresses were embellished with flint flushwork in emergent Perpendicular style, while the offsets of stone tracery in the window-arches of the north transept and Lady chapel indicate curvilinear designs now lost. The piers of the eastern arch of the crossing survive to some height, but without their facing-stones. However fragments of the capital on the north side are of late Norman style, suggesting to Sir William St John Hope that the abbey had never been moved, and to Sir Alfred Clapham (more probably) that piers from the original church had been reconstructed in the new location. The internal structure of the nave, with its arcades and clerestory, is gone, but the outer walls, much patched, show on the south (cloister) side how the large arched windows of the south aisle, broadly spaced, rose up from the string course marking the roofline of the cloister walk.

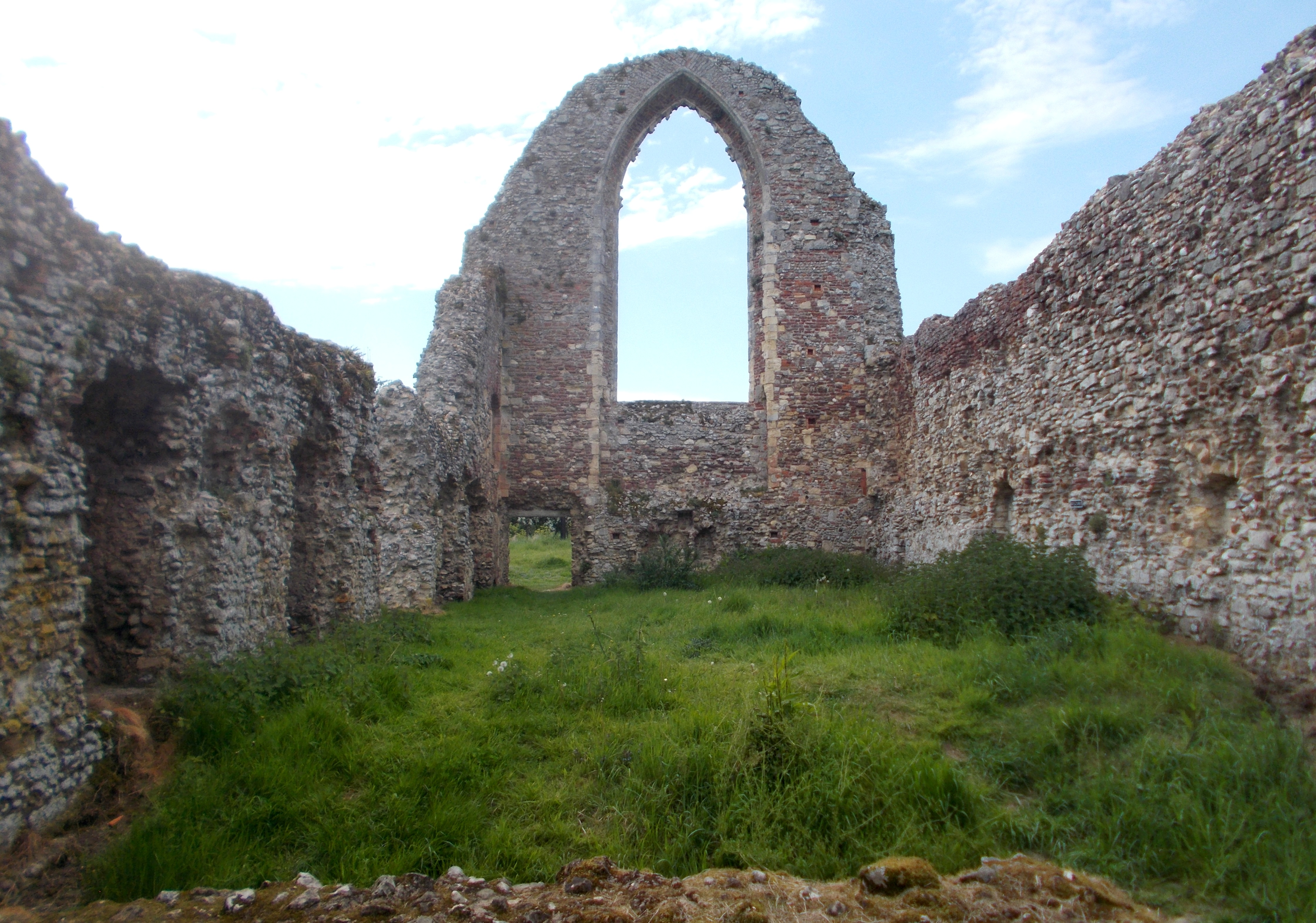
The Refectory, looking west

The cloister wall on the east side shows the openings of the sacristy, the chapter house and (possibly) the infirmary, but the dormitory which ran above it and the body of the main structure is gone. This range extended further away to the south, towards the reredorter, two walls of which are standing. The full extent of the cloister south range is occupied by the walls of the Refectory, a high hall lit principally by a very tall west window, its arch still dominating that corner of the site. Standing walls from the ground storey of the western range, which probably included the cellarer's quarters, complete the enclosure of the cloister, rising towards the western end of the church nave. The main external entrance to the cloister ran through this building, and in around 1500 a tall brick gatehouse with two octagonal turrets was added, one side of which still remains. At the north-western corner of the complex, a former farmhouse with a brick regency front represents the western limit of the church nave, an early timber house stands longways behind it occupying the former south aisle of the church, and a tall more recent building stands within the cloister yard itself.

The Guest hall is not shown by Suckling, but partially survives in buildings standing apart at the north-west corner of the site.

== Archaeological investigations ==
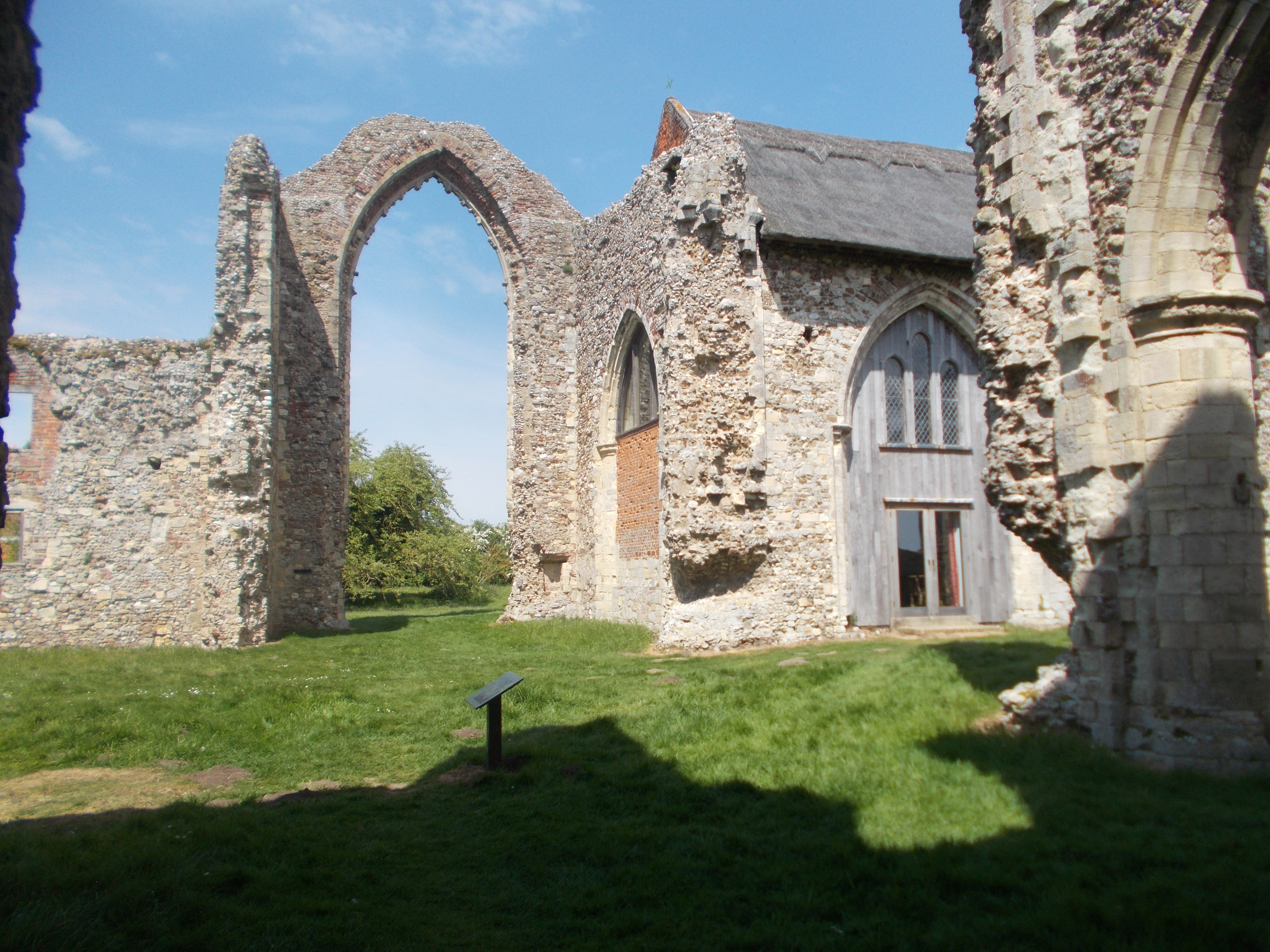
The north transept, from the south transept

The Lady chapel was preserved by use as a roofed farm building during the 18th century, and was re-thatched as a place of worship during the 20th century. Excavations during the 1980s established the position of the lost south wall and turret of the brick entrance-gate structure, and explored the interior of the reredorter building. In a separate investigation, the interior of the presumed abbey Guest Hall was excavated. Two long upstanding medieval walls had survived: they are incorporated into a new structure for the use of Pro Corda.

In 2013 Leiston Abbey was the first crowdfunding campaign to run on the DigVentures DigStarter platform. In 2015 the project entered the third year of five proposed digging seasons under a licence granted by English Heritage. Its aim was to breathe new life into the Abbey, to provide opportunities for visitors to participate in the excavation work, and to integrate the historic site with the artistic and musical life of the Pro Corda music school.

Fieldwork sought to characterize undefined earthworks and occupation evidence in three different areas of the site. Remote sensing was used to target thirteen small-scale excavation trenches: these were to locate and explore features indicated by geophysical anomalies or existing earthworks. A photogrammetry survey was conducted to produce a metrically accurate, three-dimensional digital elevation model of the Abbey Church. Low-level aerial photographic surveying, employing kite-mounted cameras and UAVs (drones), was carried out to assess structural evidence for buildings which may have formed an outer eastern range.

== Other sources ==
- T. Johnson, 'The economics of shipwreck in late medieval Suffolk', in J. Bowen and A. Brown (eds), Custom and Commercialisation in English Rural Society: Revisiting Tawney and Postan (University of Hertfordshire Press, 2016), read here (Google).
