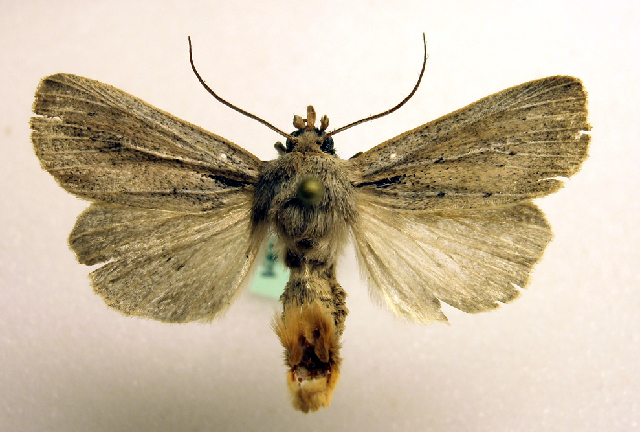
- Protarchanara brevilinea

Scientific classification
- Kingdom: Animalia
- Phylum: Arthropoda
- Class: Insecta
- Order: Lepidoptera
- Superfamily: Noctuoidea
- Family: Noctuidae
- Subfamily: Noctuinae
- Genus: Protarchanara; Beck, 1999

= Protarchanara =

Genus of moths

Protarchanara is a genus of moths of the family Noctuidae.

== Species ==
- Protarchanara abrupta Eversmann, 1854
- Protarchanara brevilinea Fenn, 1864
