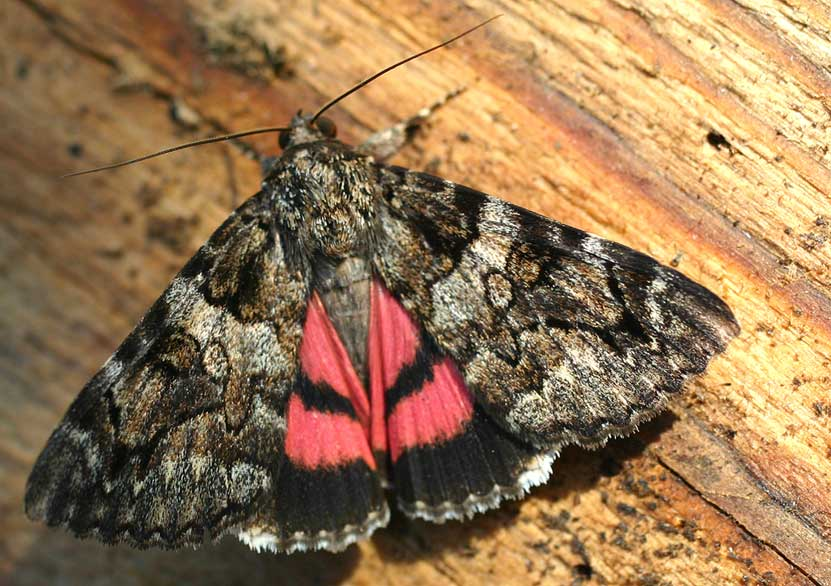

Scientific classification
- Kingdom: Animalia
- Phylum: Arthropoda
- Clade: Pancrustacea
- Class: Insecta
- Order: Lepidoptera
- Superfamily: Noctuoidea
- Family: Erebidae
- Genus: Catocala
- Species: C. coniuncta

Binomial name
- Catocala coniuncta (Esper, 1787)

Synonyms
- Catocala conjuncta (lapsus); Phalaena coniuncta Esper, 1787; Noctua conjuga Hübner, [1803]; Catocala conjuncta vivida Warren, 1913; Catocala conjuncta perrettei Seyer, 1976

= Catocala coniuncta =

Minsmere crimson underwing

Species of moth

Catocala coniuncta is a circum-Mediterranean species of moth whose range extends across southern Europe, North Africa and extending to the Middle East. Its species name has for a long time been misspelled "conjuncta"; this was only corrected in 2010.

Like other related species C. coniuncta has mottled brown fore-wings and crimson-red hind-wings with a black central line. The species differs from its European congeners in the shape of the post-median line on the fore-wing and the straighter black line on the hind-wings. The larvae feed on holm oak (Quercus ilex).

Extra-limitally, C. coniuncta has occurred just once in Britain, being found at light by Robin Harvey at the RSPB Minsmere reserve on the Suffolk coast on 14 September 2004. Following this record the English name Minsmere crimson underwing has been adopted.
