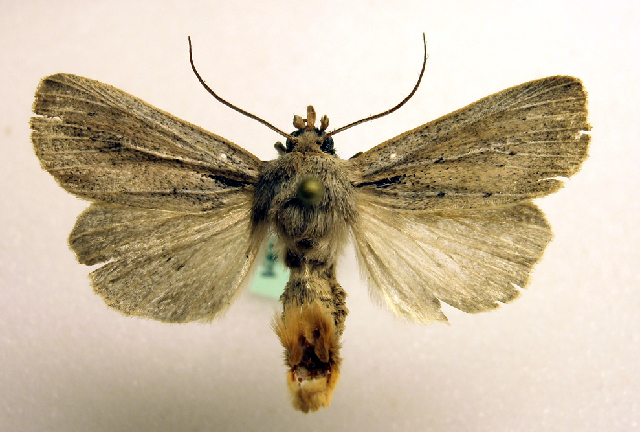

Scientific classification
- Domain: Eukaryota
- Kingdom: Animalia
- Phylum: Arthropoda
- Class: Insecta
- Order: Lepidoptera
- Superfamily: Noctuoidea
- Family: Noctuidae
- Genus: Protarchanara
- Species: P. brevilinea

Binomial name
- Protarchanara brevilinea (Fenn, 1864)

Synonyms
- Chortodes brevilinea; Nonagria brevilinea; Nonagria impudica; Photedes brevilinea

= Protarchanara brevilinea =

Species of moth

Protarchanara brevilinea, or Fenn's wainscot, is a moth of the family Noctuidae. The species was first described by Charles Fenn of Lewisham who collected specimens during an entomological excursion to Ranworth in 1864. It is found in western and northern Europe.

== Technical description and variation ==
A. brevilinea Fenn (49 d). Forewing dull grey brown densely black-dusted; the veins terminally paler; inner and outer lines represented by a series of dark vein dots; a black streak from base below cell: hindwing fuscous, darker towards termen; an outer row of dark dots; the ab. sinelinea Farn (49 d) is more uniform in coloration, without the black streak from base. Larva pale ochreous, with brown freckling; dorsal, subdorsal, and spiracular lines orange edged with yellow; head pale brown. The length of the forewings is 14–17 mm.

== Biology ==
The moth flies in one generation from mid-July to August..

The larvae feed on Phragmites living within the stems and when young feeding there; afterwards emerging from the stems by night and feeding on the leaves.

== Notes ==
1. The flight season refers to the Netherlands. This may vary in other parts of the range.
