= Minsmere =

Hamlet in Suffolk, England

Coordinates: 52.248°N 1.608°E

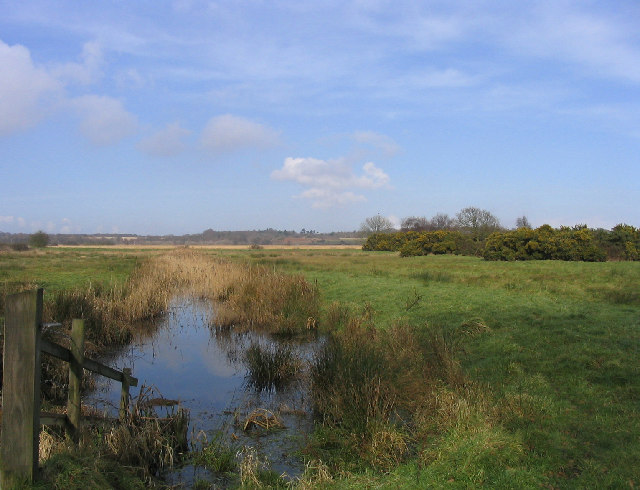
Minsmere levels

Minsmere is a place in the English county of Suffolk. It is located on the North Sea coast around 3.5 miles (5.6 km) north of Leiston and 1.5 miles (2.4 km) south-east of Westleton within the Suffolk Coast and Heaths AONB. It is the site of the Minsmere RSPB reserve and the original site of Leiston Abbey.

== History ==
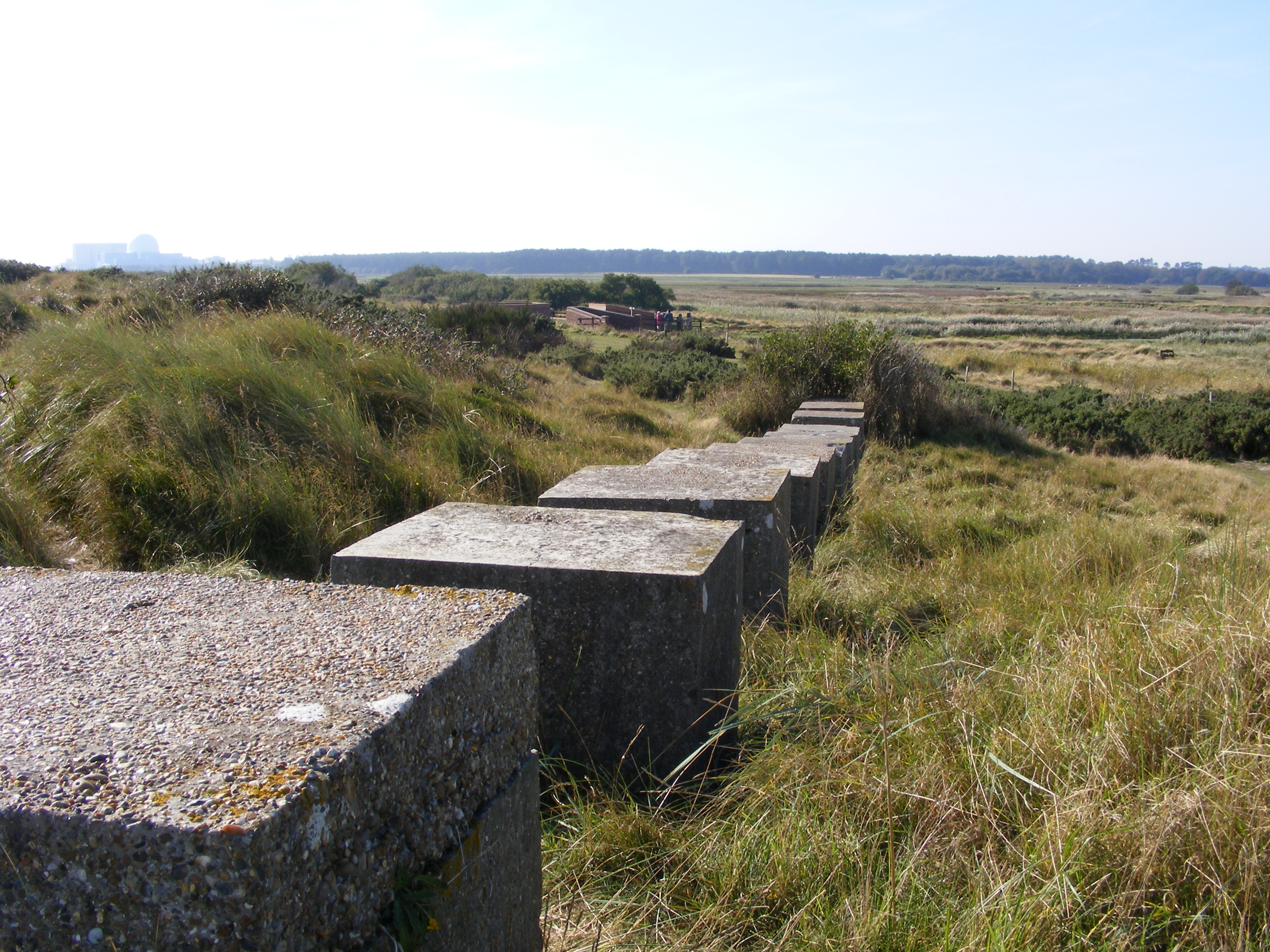
Minsmere beach with WW2 tank traps

At the Domesday Book survey in 1086 Minsmere was known as Menesmara or Milsemere. It is recorded as having six households headed by freemen with one plough team. The manor, which was in the Hundred of Blythling, was held by Roger Bigot.

Ranulf de Glanvill, King Henry II's Lord Chief Justice, founded an abbey on the marshes at Minsmere in 1182, but, probably due to an increased risk of flooding, this was abandoned in favour of Leiston Abbey in 1363.

Peat cutting took place at Minsmere from at least the 12th century and a 1237 description of the coastline describes Minsmere as a port. Minsmere is recorded in the 14th century as being a small village with around 10 homesteads, but these had all been lost to the sea by the 16th century. A survey of 1587 records that the early Tudor period 'entrenchments' at Minsmere were in ruins and recommended that they be rebuilt. During the 18th century Minsmere, Eastbridge and the Sizewell gap were renowned as a hotbed for smugglers. A coastguard station operated at Minsmere in the 1840s in an attempt to control smuggling along this stretch of the coast.

The marshes along the Minsmere River were drained for agricultural use in the 1840s but reflooded during the Second World War to defend against invasion along the East Anglian coast. A number of military defences were built in the area, including pill boxes, anti-tank blocks and barbed wire defence lines. Cottages and a beach cafe on the coast at Minsmere sluice were evacuated, used as target practice and later demolished. The Minsmere RSPB reserve was established in 1947, making use of the wetland habitats reintroduced by wartime flooding.

== Geography ==
Minsmere is in a low-lying area of the Suffolk coast approximately 24 miles (39 km) north-east of Ipswich. It is in the civil parishes of Westleton and Leiston with the parish border running along the Minsmere Old River. It borders the parish of Theberton at Eastbridge to the south-west and the parish of Dunwich to the north along the coast.

The landscape is largely flat along the line of the river. This is known as the Minsmere Level, an area of drained and re-flooded marshland with underlying alluvial geology. The area to the south of the Minsmere New Cut drainage ditch, built in 1812, is used as grazing marsh. To the north the wetland areas are flooded and managed as part of the RSPB's habitat management strategy for its Minsmere reserve. This area includes drier areas of sandlings, including areas of mixed woodland rising up to 20 metres above sea level on sandy ridges.

The area provides a number of important habitats, including for species such as bitterns, marsh harriers, hen harriers, avocets and Dartford warblers. The wetland areas include flooded lagoons and much of the area is designated as a Ramsar site. The grazing marshes to the south of the Minsmere Levels provide overwintering grounds for a variety of different waterfowl species.

The coastline at Minsmere consists of a narrow shingle beach and some areas of sand dune with a shingle bank protecting the low-lying coastal areas. This area is at risk of flooding from coastal surges although, unlike areas to the north and south, it does not suffer significantly from coastal erosion. To the north Minsmere Cliffs are found within Dunwich Heath, a National Trust property. The cliffs consist of loose, unconsolidated sand and shingle glacial deposits and suffer from coastal erosion.

== Minsmere Sluice Chapel ==
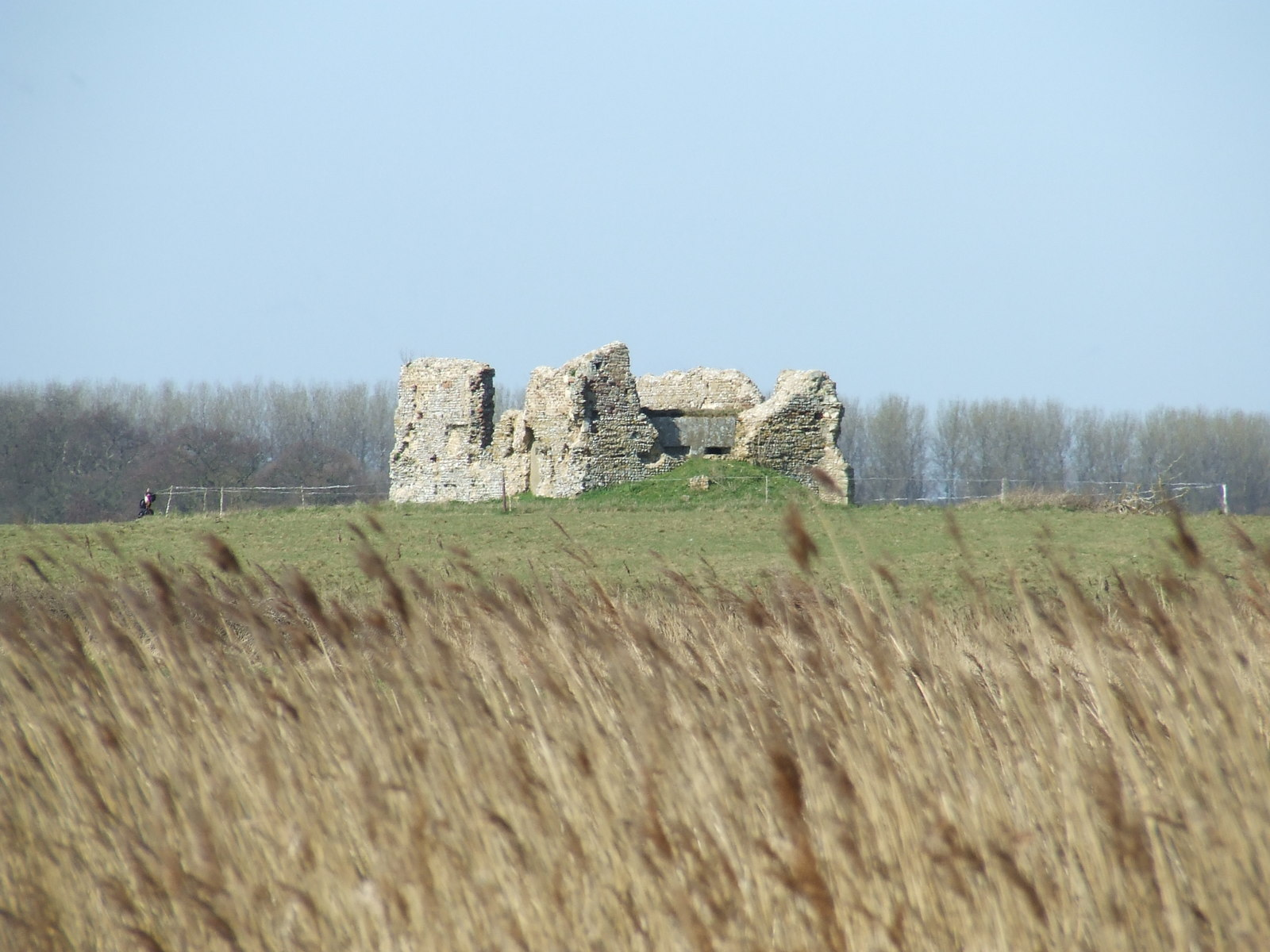
The remains of the chapel of St Mary

The remains of a chapel built on the original site of Leiston Abbey are located on the Minsmere Level to the south of the Minsmere New Cut. These are the only visible remains at the site of the original Premonstratensian Abbey. The chapel was probably built when the abbey was relocated and stands on the site of the original monastic church, the stone from which was probably used to build the new abbey at Leiston. It is thought to have been used as a chapel dedicated to St Mary until the dissolution of the monasteries in 1537. The abbey was originally built on an island in the marshland but is believed to have suffered from frequent coastal flooding which led to its relocation to Leiston in 1363. Geophysical surveys have shown that a number of archaeological features lie buried in the immediate area, including remains of the abbey church, cloisters and fish ponds.

The chapel remains include a pillbox built in the early stages of the Second World War. The site and its surrounding area is a scheduled ancient monument. The chapel remains were restored in 2011 to preserve them and to allow some public access.
