= Eastbridge Windpump =

Windmill in Suffolk, United Kingdom

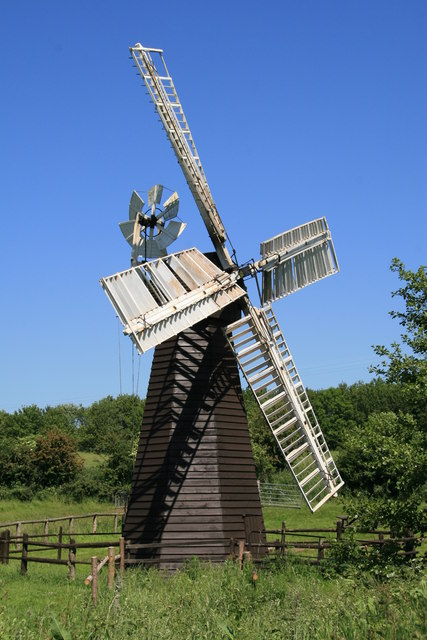
- Eastbridge Windpump as restored at the Museum of East Anglian Life

Origin
- Mill name: Eastbridge Windpump
- Mill location: TM 045 580
- Coordinates: 52°10′56″N 0°59′32″E
- Operator(s): Museum of East Anglian Life
- Year built: 1979

Information
- Purpose: drainage mill
- Type: Smock mill
- Smock sides: Eight sides
- No. of sails: Four Sails
- Type of sails: Patent sails
- Windshaft: Cast iron
- Winding: Fantail
- Fantail blades: Six blades
- Type of pump: Three-throw plunger pump

Eastbridge Windpump is a smock mill that served as a pumping station until it was relocated to the Museum of East Anglian Life, Stowmarket, Suffolk, England and which was then restored to working order.

== History ==
Eastbridge Windpump was probably built in the mid nineteenth century by Robert Martin, the Beccles millwright. It was originally part of the structures built to maintain the drainage of the Minsmere Levels, Eastbridge, Leiston (TM 468 662). In the early 1920s, millwright Dan England of Ludham reinforced the mill by bolting the frame from a nearby smock mill (TM 475 659), which had collapsed, over the weatherboarding. It worked by wind until 1940. After the war, an iron windpump was erected nearby to take over from Eastbridge Windpump. On 19 February 1977, Eastbridge Windpump collapsed. The remains were dismantled by members of Suffolk Mills Group in July 1977 and later incorporated into the rebuilt mill at the Museum of East Anglian Life, Stowmarket. The restoration work was done by Jameson Marshall Ltd.

== Description ==
Eastbridge windpump is a 30 feet (9.14 m) high smock mill on a brick base of a few courses. It has a boat-shaped cap and is winded by a fantail. The four Patent sails are carried on a cast-iron windshaft. They span 44 feet (13.41 m). The cast-iron brake wheel drives a cast-iron wallower carried on a cast-iron upright shaft. A cast-iron crown wheel drives a three-throw plunger pump, which has cylinders 1 foot (305 mm) square.

== Public access ==
Eastbridge Windpump is open to the public and may be viewed externally during normal opening times of the Museum of East Anglian Life.
