= Alfred Inigo Suckling =

British antiquarian (1796–1856)

Alfred Inigo Suckling (1796–1856), surname originally Fox, was an English clergyman, an author and historian of Suffolk.

== Life ==
Born on 31 January 1796 in Norwich, he was the only son of Alexander Fox, by his wife Anna Maria (née Suckling, d.1848), daughter of Robert Suckling of Woodton in Norfolk, by his wife, Susannah Webb, a descendant of Inigo Jones. Robert Suckling, his maternal grandfather, was of an old Norfolk family, which counted among its members the poet Sir John Suckling and Horatio Nelson's uncle, Maurice William Suckling. On the death of Robert's son, Maurice, without issue on 1 December 1820, Alfred Inigo took the surname and arms of Suckling and succeeded to the estates.

He was educated at Pembroke College, Cambridge, where he matriculated in May 1814 and graduated LL.B. in 1824. He was ordained at Norwich on 15 October 1820. On 10 July 1839 he was instituted on his own petition to the rectory of Barsham in Suffolk, which he held until his death.

He devoted most of his life to topographical depictions of Suffolk and Essex, his most notable work being the monumental 'History and Antiquities of Suffolk'.

He died at 40 Belmont Road, St. Helier, Jersey, on 3 May 1856 and is buried in Jersey.

== Works ==
- Memorials of the County of Essex, London, 1845; originally printed in ‘Quarterly Papers on Architecture,’ 1845, vol. iii., edited by John Weale.
- The History and Antiquities of the County of Suffolk, London, 1846–8, incomplete.
- His Antique and Armorial Collections, 1821–39, 16 vols. consisting of notices of architectural and monumental antiquities in England and Picardy, form Additional MSS. 18476–91 (British Museum).
- He also edited Selections from the Works of Sir John Suckling, with a Life of the Author, London, 1836.

== Family ==
On 31 January 1816 he married Lucy Clementina, eldest daughter of Samuel Clarke, by whom he had four sons—Robert Alfred, Maurice Shelton, Charles Richard, and Henry Edward—and six daughters.

== General references ==
- "Suckling, Alfred Inigo" . Dictionary of National Biography. London: Smith, Elder & Co. 1885–1900. - but note that the birthplace of his father-in-law is incorrectly cited there.
- Alumni Cantabrigienses: A Biographical List of All Known Students ..., Volume 2, by John Venn, p. 79.
- Notes and queries, 8th Series, Vol 12, Jul-Dec 1897. https://archive.org/stream/s8notesqueries12londuoft/s8notesqueries12londuoft_djvu.txt

Attribution

This article incorporates text from a publication now in the public domain: "Suckling, Alfred Inigo". Dictionary of National Biography. London: Smith, Elder & Co. 1885–1900.
