= Eastbridge =

Village in Suffolk, England

Coordinates: 52.237°N 1.592°E

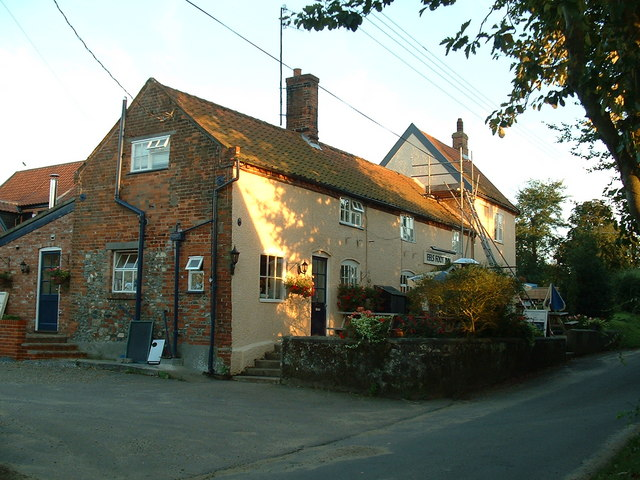

- Location within Suffolk
- Shire county: Suffolk
- Region: East
- Country: England
- Sovereign state: United Kingdom
- Post town: Leiston
- Postcode district: IP16
- Dialling code: 01728

Eastbridge is a village in the English county of Suffolk. It is located approximately 4 miles (6.4 km) north of Leiston, 2 miles (3.2 km) from the North Sea in the parish of Theberton, immediately south of the Minsmere RSPB reserve. It borders the Minsmere River which cuts through an area of drained and undrained wetland known as the Minsmere Level.

Eastbridge Windpump, which stood on the Minsmere Level marshes, is preserved at the Museum of East Anglian Life in Stowmarket. The marshes are also the site of the remains of the medieval chapel of St Mary which stands on the original site of Leiston Abbey. The chapel ruins date from the 12th-century and include a World War II pill box which was built into the walls to protect against invasion. The site is a scheduled monument.

Located in Eastbridge is the Eels Foot Inn, an ale-house dating as far back as 1533 which obtained a full license to sell alcohol in 1950. Because of its proximity to the sea, the pub was a favourite stop of travellers, drovers and smugglers. The pub is the main feature of the small village. It is associated with folk music, and hosts a weekly gathering in which people sing songs and play folk tunes.
