= Guy Ferre the Elder =

Guy Ferre the Elder (died 1303) was a Gascon nobleman in English service.

Guy served King Henry III and Queen Eleanor of Provence, who paid him to accompany their second son, Edmund Crouchback, on the Crusade of 1271. After Edward I succeeded Henry III in 1272, Guy remained in Eleanor's household first as a knight and later as her steward until her retirement to Amesbury Priory in 1286. On 23 November 1275, the king by letters patent authorized Guy to hold for life the manor of Witley that Eleanor had given him. In 1279, Eleanor gave him and his wife Joan, daughter of Thomas Fitz-Otto, the manor of Fakenham. In 1290, at Eleanor's request, Guy was appointed a justice to investigate the mismanagement of her properties by her officials. In her will, he was named as one of her executors. He was still acting that capacity as late as January 1303.

From perhaps as early as 1293 and certainly by 1295, Guy was an advisor of Prince Edward of Caernarfon "by the king's special order". In 1295, at the outbreak of war with France, the sheriff of Norfolk seized some of Guy's property in accordance with the king's order against "all alien laymen of the power of the king of France". In December, Edward I ordered the sheriff to restore Guy's property since Guy was "not in the power of the king of France and never adhered to him against the king at any time." At the same time, Guy intervened on behalf of a foreign priest of Wood Norton named Reymund, who daily said mass at Amesbury for the soul of Eleanor and was likewise exempted from the king's order.

Guy accompanied Edward of Caernarfon during the English invasion of Scotland in 1300. His nephew, Guy Ferre the Younger, was also present. They are both recorded in the Galloway Roll, where the elder's canting arms are described as "gules a mill-rind (fer de moulyn) ermine". His nephew's were the same but with an added baton azure. Uncle and nephew appear some 300 times in contemporary sources but are only occasionally distinguished as elder (senior) and younger (iunior). The elder Guy died in the spring of 1303 while accompanying the prince north for another campaign in Scotland. A mass was said for his soul on 14 April at Durham.
