= Guy Ferre (died 1323) =

Gascon knight and administrator

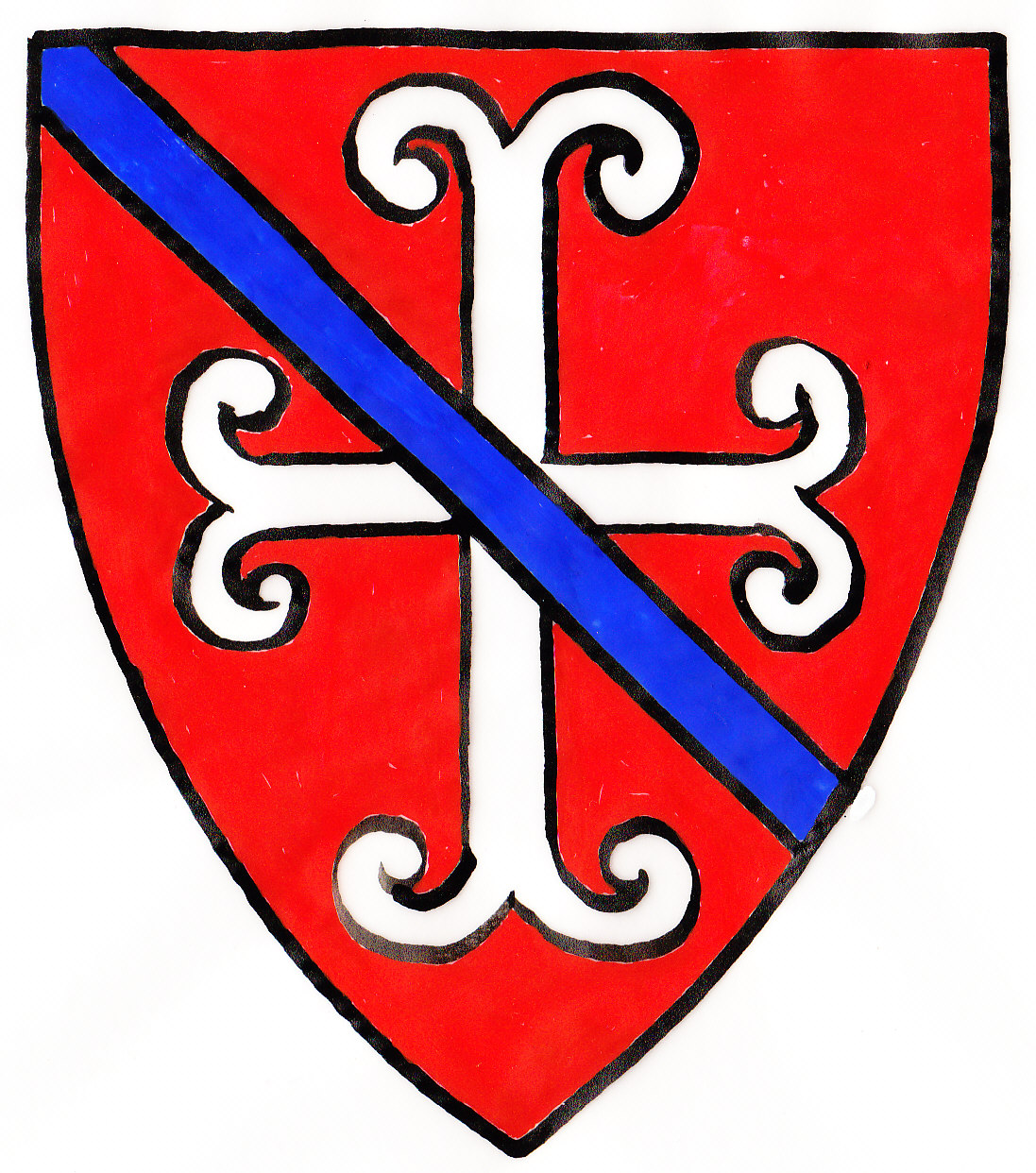
Arms of Sir Guy Ferre:Gules, a fer-de-moline argent over all a bendlet azure.

Guy Ferre, known as the younger, was a 14th century Gascon knight and administrator who served as Seneschal of Gascony (1298-99 and 1308-1309).

Ferre was the son of John Ferre and nephew of Guy Ferre the Elder. He was a household knight of Eleanor, Queen consort of England between 1277 and 1290 and household steward between 1288 and 1290. Appointed on 12 March 1308 as Seneschal of Gascony, replacing John de Havering, Ferres served until he was replaced by John de Hastings in 1309. He was married to Eleanor Mountender and died without issue in 1323.
