= The Food Museum =

Museum in Suffolk, UK

Coordinates: 52.18588°N 0.99155°E

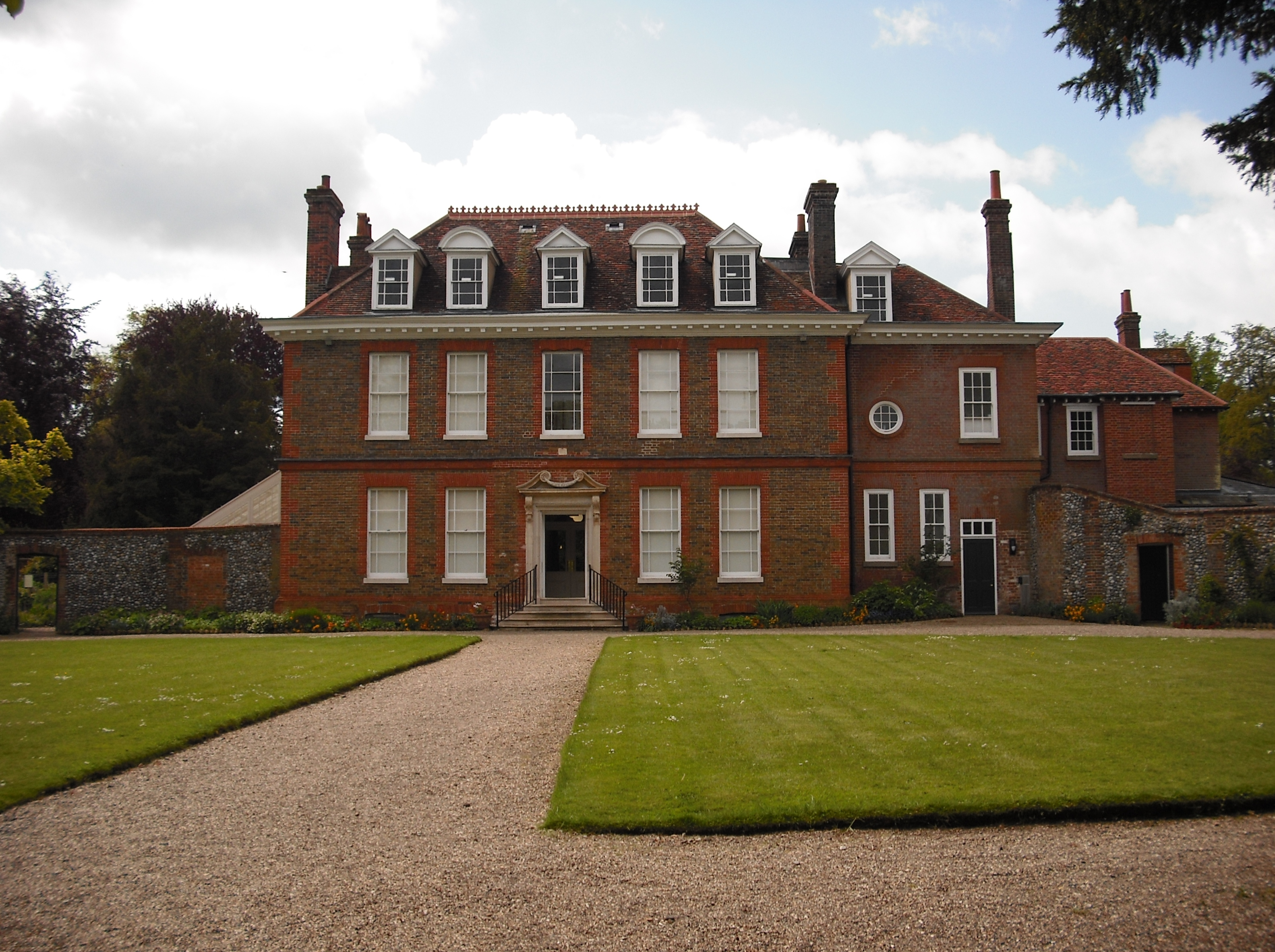
- Abbot's Hall

- Location within Suffolk
- Former name: Museum of East Anglian Life
- Established: 1967
- Location: Iliffe Way, Stowmarket, Suffolk, England
- Type: Food museum
- Collection size: Over 40,000 objects
- Website: The Food Museum

The Food Museum, formerly the Museum of East Anglian Life, is a museum in Stowmarket, Suffolk, England focused on the farming and food production industries. It consists of an 84-acre estate and 17 historic buildings.

== History of the Museum ==
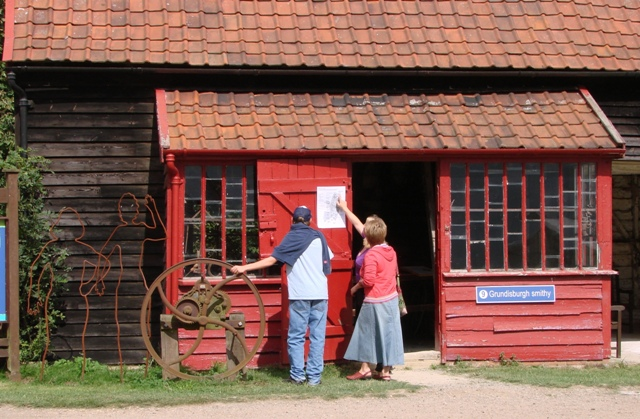
Grundisburgh Smithy

The land was originally part of the Abbot’s Hall estate. The estate dates from medieval times, when it was an outlying manor for St Osyth's Priory in Essex. It passed through numerous owners until it was purchased by the Longe family in 1903.

Farmer Jack Carter, the Suffolk Local History Council, and others had collected, preserved and displayed objects from rural East Anglia. After several years of temporary exhibitions at other places, Vera and Ena Longe donated 1.38 acres of land including Stowmarket's oldest building, a Grade II* Medieval Barn to be used as a permanent site for the museum. The Museum opened in 1967. In 1970, they placed the rest of their land, including 75 acres (30 ha) of farmland, the Grade II* listed house Abbot’s Hall, its gardens and ancillary buildings, in trust to become part of the museum. Some parcels of land were handed over to museum use over the next three decades and the full estate was leased to the museum in 2004 after the Longe sisters' deaths.

In April 2022, the museum was renamed The Food Museum.

== Buildings ==
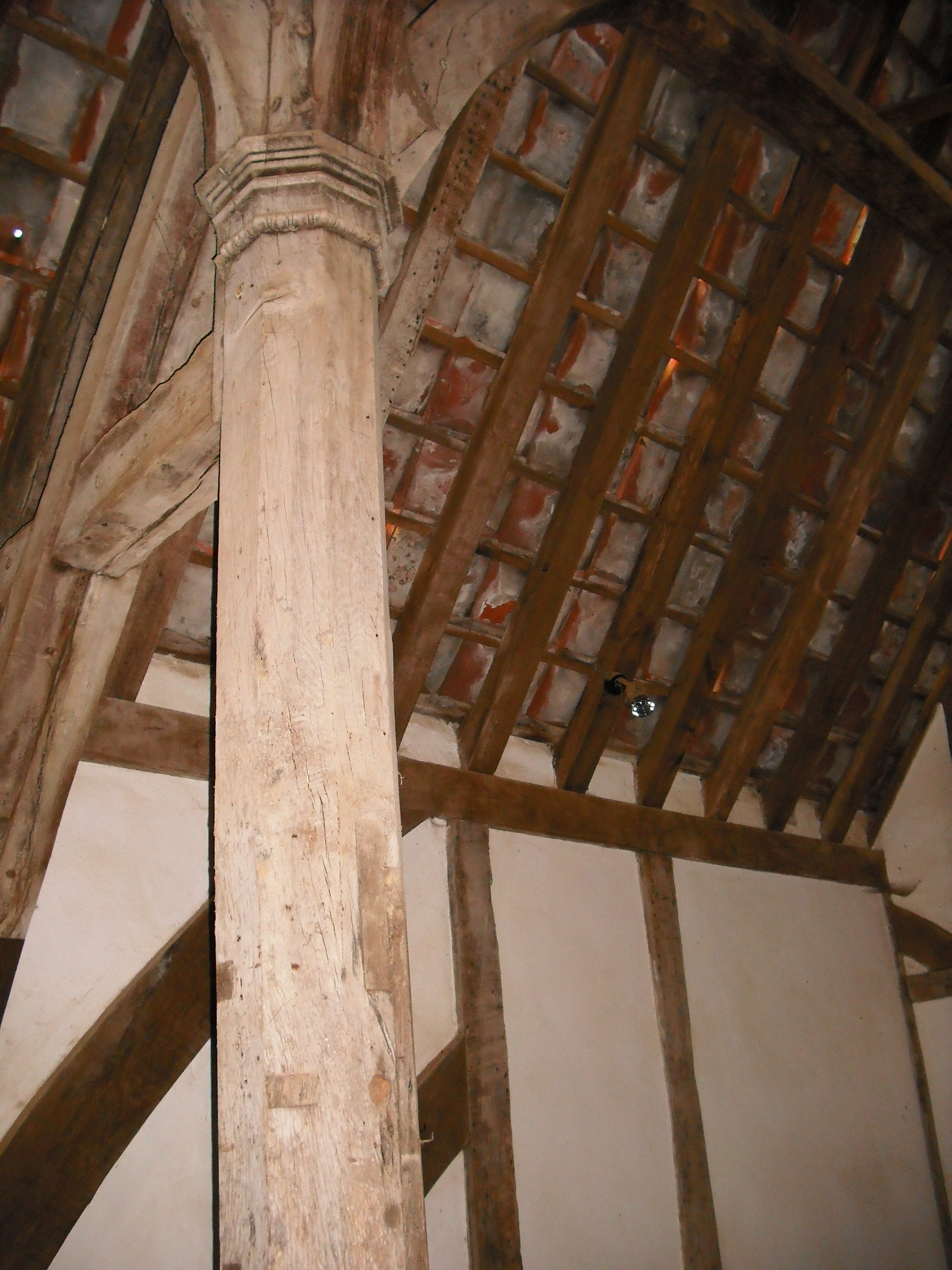
14th-century Edgar's Farmhouse, interior

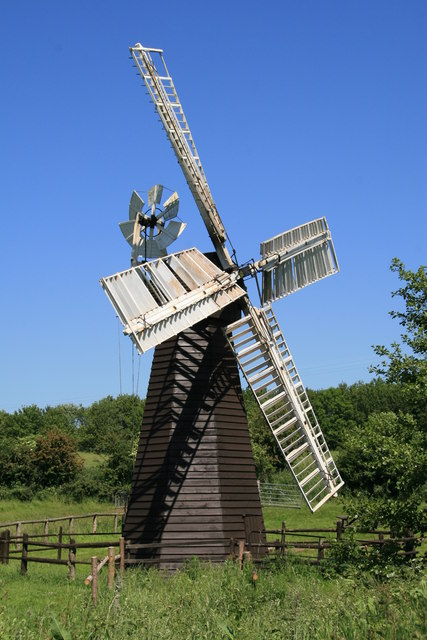
Eastbridge Windpump

The Museum has various buildings on its 84 acres (34 ha) site, including:

- William Bone Gallery - a modern building, hosting the museum's annual exhibition programme, as well as a demonstration kitchen.
- Abbot's Hall — each room in the Queen Anne house explores the idea of home in East Anglia, as well as hosting temporary exhibitions in the Community Galleries.
- Edgar's farmhouse — a 14th-century aisled farmhouse from Combs, which had been incorporated into a Victorian-era farmhouse. Saved from demolition in 1970, it was the first historic building to be re-erected on the museum site. The first recorded owners were John and Ascelina Adgor. The building is Grade II* listed.
- Crowe Street Cottages — the last pair of workers' cottages to remain as part of the Abbot's Hall Estate. The buildings have been kept as they were left, as dairy cottages.
- Boby Building — features exhibitions of agricultural engines and individual craft workshops, along with a working printing press.
- Eastbridge Windpump — a windpump used for draining land in the 19th century.
- Alton Watermill — an 18th-century watermill which was used to grind corn. Like many of the museum buildings, it was taken apart and then transported to the museum where it was reassembled. The watermill was moved to prevent it from being destroyed by the Alton Water Reservoir.

== Restoration of Abbot's Hall ==
The museum was awarded a grant from the Heritage Lottery Fund to renovate Abbot's Hall and Crowe Street Cottages. The project was completed in April 2012 and officially opened in June 2012. There are nine exhibition spaces exploring ideas of home and belonging in East Anglia, as well as space for temporary exhibitions. Crowe Street Cottages, which were occupied by workers at Abbot's Hall, have been displayed as they would have looked when the last owner lived there.

Abbot's Hall is open year-round, as part of entry to the museum. The Hall features a permanent exhibition of the life and works of Welsh folklorist George Ewart Evans.

== Development as The Food Museum ==
In 2018, the museum's trustees and staff embarked on a rebranding of the museum and a series of projects, including the restoration of Alton Watermill and Eastbridge Windpump to working order, the construction of a Farm Barn to house some of the museum's collection of farming equipment, and the refurbishment of the William Bone Gallery to house a changing programme of annual exhibitions. The museum embarked on the next stage of development in 2023 with a programme of works to construct new visitor facilities, conserve the Medieval Barn and build new exhibition spaces.

== Events ==
Since becoming the Food Museum in 2022, the museum has run daily talks, tours and activities around the site, focusing on farming, animals and cooking. The museum also runs a programme of cooking workshops, family activities, exhibitions and large events throughout the year.

Since 1996, the Food Museum has hosted an annual Festival of Beer and Brewing, showcasing beer and cider from independent breweries.

The Museum hosts Primadonna Festival, an inclusive literature festival, annually in summer, and the East Anglian Storytelling Festival.

The museum previously hosted the Stowblues Festival. The festival was organised in partnership with BBC Radio Suffolk.

In August 2016 the Museum hosted the East Anglian Living History Fayre run in partnership with Black Knight Historical.
