= 2026 United Kingdom wildfires =

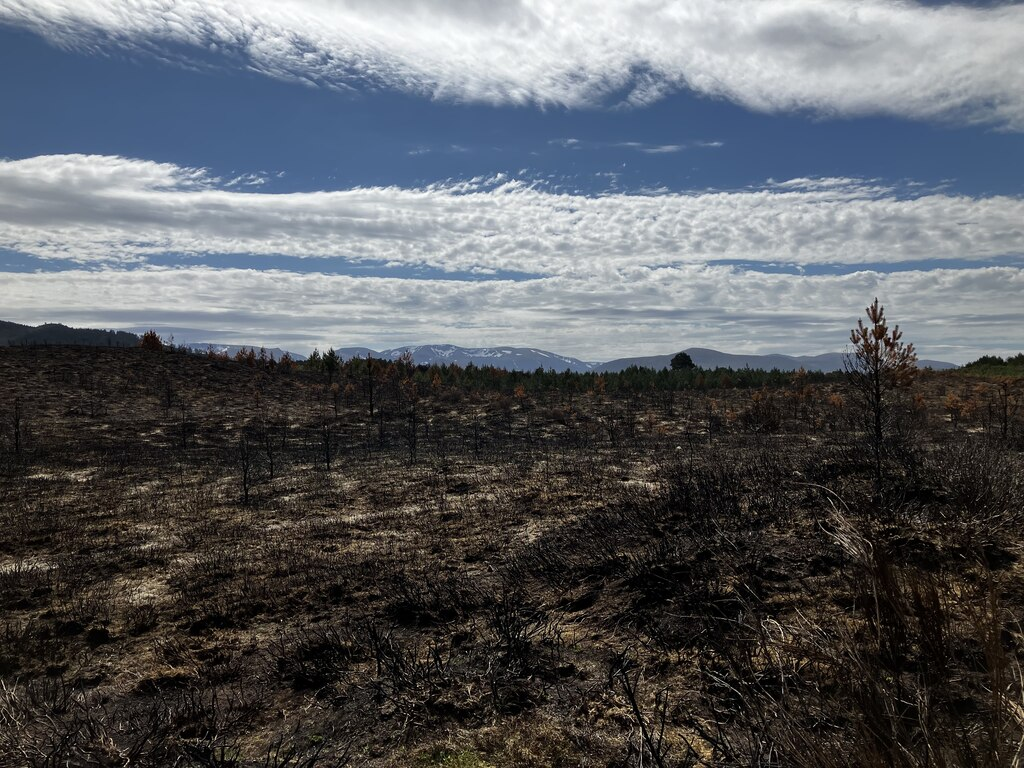
- Fire-damaged moorland near Aviemore

Statistics
- Total fires: 72 (30 ha (74 acres) or larger)
- Total area: 23,359 ha (57,720 acres; 233.59 km^{2}; 90.19 sq mi)

Impacts
- Injuries: 19 hospitalised 39 minor injuries
- Evacuated: 700+
- Structures destroyed: 37 houses

Map
- Perimeters of 2026 United Kingdom wildfires (map data)

During 2026, many wildfires have occurred across the United Kingdom, fuelled by several record-breaking heatwaves. As of 10 August, over 23,359 ha (57,720 acres; 90.19 sq mi; 233.59 km^{2}) have been burnt, with 72 fires larger than 30 ha (74 acres) being recorded. Several of these fires forced evacuations and damaged property and protected habitats, with many requiring multi-agency responses as fire authorities raised risk levels and issued warnings amid deteriorating conditions.

== Overview ==
The European Forest Fire Information System (EFFIS) keeps records of wildfires in Europe and has maintained a database since 2004. This year's fires have not been as severe as the previous year's, which saw both the highest burned area and number of fires since the EFFIS's records began, reaching 47,879 ha (118,310 acres; 184.86 sq mi; 478.79 km^{2}) and 181 fires greater than 30 ha (74 acres). As of 10 August, 23,359 ha (57,720 acres; 90.19 sq mi; 233.59 km^{2}) have been burnt, with 72 fires at least 30 ha (74 acres) in size being mapped during 2026. These fires were exacerbated by a series of record-breaking heatwaves that saw extreme temperatures and dry conditions throughout May, June and July. To respond to the wildfires, firefighting techniques have been deployed including helicopters. A study has found that large fires in the northern hemisphere could increase UK air pollution. The wildfires have been reportedly affected by climate change. There were particularly destructive wildfires on the hottest day of the year. On 17 August, the Met Office forecast rain and thunderstorms.

== March ==
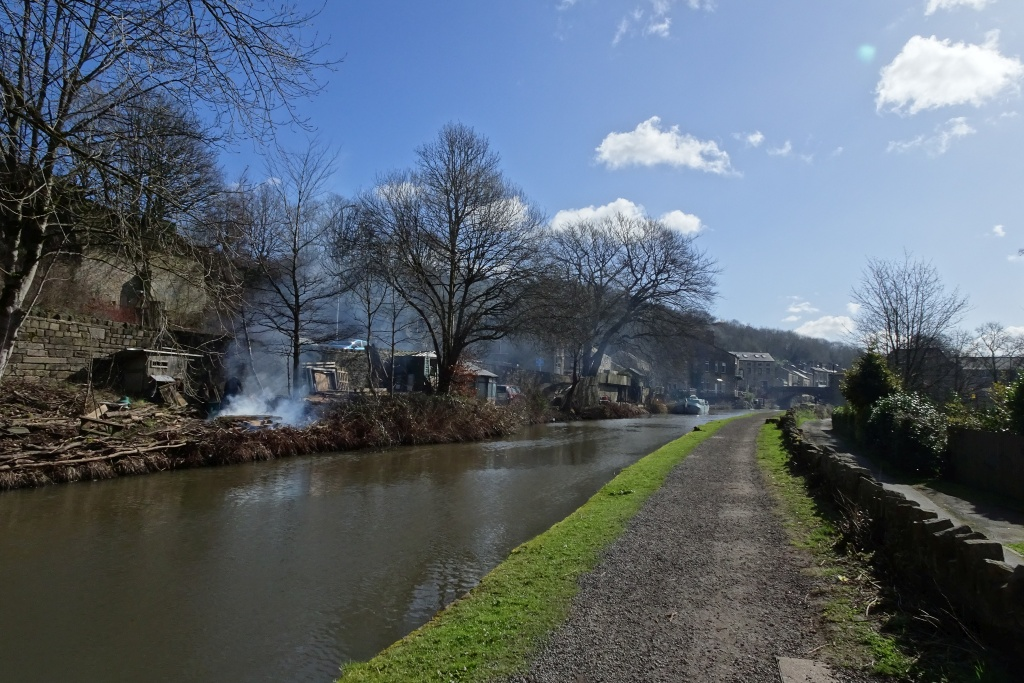
Fire damage in Calderdale.

On 4 March, a wildfire broke out on Marsden Moor and grew to 400 m^{2} (4,300 sq ft) before being brought under control. On 23 March, eight appliances tackled a blaze at the Stiperstones which burned around 1.5 ha (3.7 acres) of gorse. Two fires covering around 2 ha (4.9 acres) and 4 ha (9.9 acres) respectively started close to the Scout Moor Wind Farm and took crews around four hours to bring under control. On 28 March, over 60 firefighters tackled fires on heathland near Sandford, the first of which affected around 2,100 m^{2} (23,000 sq ft) before multiple others were found nearby, all of which were believed to have been started deliberately.

== April ==
=== England ===
On 7 April, firefighters were called to blazes at two locations on Marsden Moor which spread to 300 ha (740 acres; 3.0 km^{2}; 1.2 sq mi); a further four fires broke out on the moor the following. On 11 April, a fire burned around 3 ha (7.4 acres) of heathland at Whitmoor Common. On 20 April, a wildfire at Pegwell Bay destroyed around 3 acres (1.2 ha) of a reed bed. During the early hours of 22 April, an approximately 200,000 m^{2} (49 acres) wildfire broke out on moorland close to Ladybower Reservoir in Derbyshire, burning for around nine hours. Another wildfire covering 600,000 m^{2} (150 acres) of moorland at Woodhead Reservoir in Derbyshire, close to the Woodhead Pass, broke out in the evening of 22 April and was tackled by fire crews from four counties at its peak. The Surrey Fire and Rescue Service issued a wildfire warning on 23 April after two fires that week at Hankley Common and Blackheath Common affected 2 ha (4.9 acres) and 1 ha (2.5 acres) respectively. On 24 April, several engines tackled a large fire on Bodmin Moor near Minions. Another fire started on Marsden Moor on 26 April near Scammonden Reservoir, with ten crews working into the following day to extinguish it. On 27 April, crews in Hampshire worked overnight to tackle a blaze which destroyed around 3 ha (7.4 acres) of heathland and woodland near Bordon. On 30 April, a wildfire started near Snake Pass and affected around 340 ha (840 acres; 3.4 km^{2}; 1.3 sq mi) of moorland before being brought under control after five days.

=== Northern Ireland ===
On 25 April, a large wildfire broke out in the Mourne Mountains near Newcastle which was tackled by 80 firefighters and burned around 1,000 ha (2,500 acres; 10 km^{2}; 3.9 sq mi) before being brought under control on 28 April. On 26 April, another fire started in the mountains, this time near Hilltown, which was dealt with by 30 April after spreading to around 1,500 ha (3,700 acres; 15 km^{2}; 5.8 sq mi). Another fire started near Newcastle on 28 April and was brought under control by 30 April; at its height 45 firefighters were at the scene tackling a fire front of 600 m (2,000 ft). On 29 April, a fire started near Mullaghbawn and grew to 8 acres (3.2 ha) with 30 firefighters working to extinguish it. Another fire in the forest at Loughermore was being tackled by 49 firefighters. On 30 April, around 85 firefighters fought a blaze that burned through 175 ha (430 acres; 1.75 km^{2}; 0.68 sq mi) in Brookeborough, where teams worked carefully to protect a curlew nest, which is critically endangered in Northern Ireland.

=== Scotland ===
On 23 April, six appliances were sent to a large grass fire near Kincorth in Aberdeen. On 24 April, the Scottish Fire and Rescue Service tackled several wildfires, including one at Tarbet which was fought by four crews and a specialist team for nine hours and another which stretched for 5 mi (8.0 km) on the banks of Loch Fionn.

=== Wales ===
Perimeters of 2026 Powys wildfire (map data)

On 26 April, several wildfires started in the Elan Valley which took crews from the Mid and West Wales Fire and Rescue Service over six days to bring under control with the assistance of a helicopter. Smoke from the fires could be seen from space, with satellite images showing a plume of smoke stretching over 50 km (31 mi) across Mid Wales; following heavy rainfall, the fire service said the situation had "improved significantly" by 1 May after over 8,000 ha (20,000 acres; 80 km^{2}; 31 sq mi) had been burnt. On 29 April, a large wildfire broke out in the Brecon Beacons National Park near Pen y Fan and spread to over 20 km^{2} (7.7 sq mi), forcing the closure of the A470 road.

== May ==
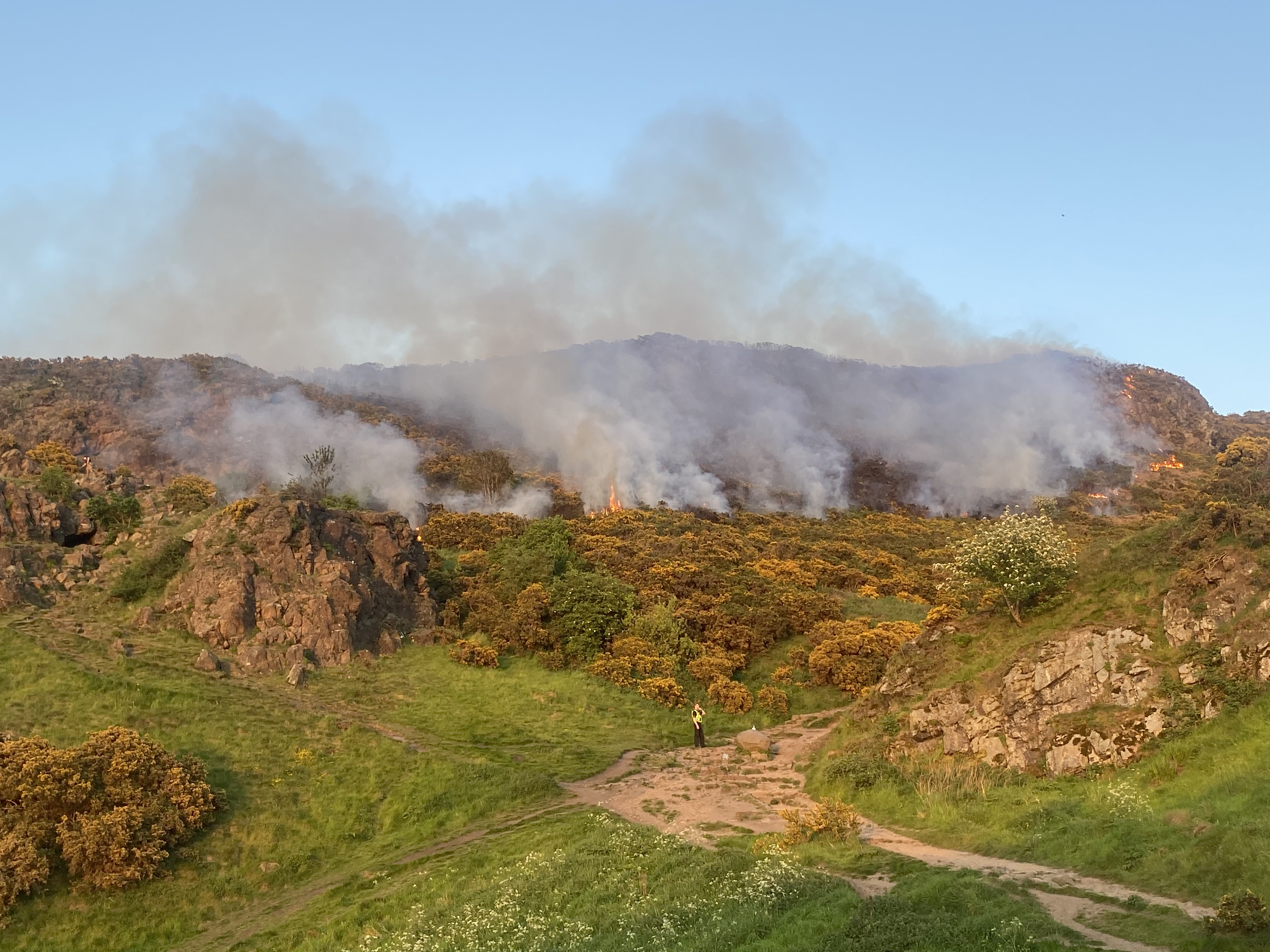
A fire on Arthur's Seat on 25 May.

A wildfire which broke out in the Peak District late on 30 April escalated at the start of May. The fire, which was burning close to the summit of the A57 Snake Pass road, expanded to cover 450,000 m^{2} (110 acres) by dawn on 1 May and forced the closure of the Snake Pass for two days. Nine fire engines attended the fire alongside specialists from the Derby Mountain Rescue unit and a water-bombing helicopter. Smoke from the fire drifted over the town of Glossop, with residents warned to keep doors and windows closed. The fire burned 900,000 m^{2} (220 acres) of moorland before being brought under control on 2 May.

On 25 May, a wildfire broke out on Arthur's Seat in Edinburgh, with crews working into the following day to bring it under control. On 28 May, a fire started in the Pentland Hills, with six engines tackling it at its height.

== June ==
A woodland fire broke out close to houses and a railway line in Beighton, Sheffield during the night of 19 June, with South Yorkshire Fire and Rescue sending crews from four fire stations to tackle the blaze. The fire burned for several hours before being brought under control, and subsequent investigation alongside the British Transport Police determined the source of the fire to be arson in a pile of disused railway sleepers on Network Rail land.

On 24 June, a blaze started on moorland near Tintwistle which ultimately spread to over 600 ha (1,500 acres; 6.0 km^{2}; 2.3 sq mi) as it continued to burn more than a month later. By the next day, the wildfire had significantly escalated, as high winds caused it to spread from low-lying moorland into the canopy of surrounding woodlands. A United Utilities water-bombing helicopter conducted around 2,000 sorties over the fire, dropping more than 10 million litres of water onto it from above over three days at a cost of at least £500,000; the fire was initially contained by 26 June, before re-escalating in mid-July.

== July ==
=== England ===
On 4 July, a wildfire believed to have been started deliberately near Wareham was tackled by crews from 13 stations. On 6 July, another fire believed to have been started deliberately burnt 3 ha (7.4 acres) of heathland at Bourne Valley. Also on 6 July, a fire broke out in woodland at the Strawberry Hill Heath nature reserve near Mansfield in Nottinghamshire; the fire burned for around seven hours before being brought under control, although remained smouldering underground for a considerable time afterwards. On 7 July, four engines and several specialist vehicles fought a blaze that affected 4 ha (9.9 acres) at Brentmoor Heath. On 10 July, 13 vehicles including eight fire engines were sent to a blaze at Devil's Dyke which continued into the following day.

On 11 July, a large wildfire began near Dove Stone Reservoir and later merged with a pre-existing fire that had started on 24 June at Tintwistle before meeting another fire at Saddleworth Moor which started on 14 July, combining to destroy around 885 ha (2,190 acres; 8.85 km^{2}; 3.42 sq mi) of moorland. The Tintwistle Moor fire re-escalated due to high winds on 13 July, and combined with other fires in the area this prompted the Derbyshire Fire and Rescue Service to declare a major incident whilst National Highways closed the Woodhead Pass for several days. One person was charged with aggravated arson whilst another two were arrested on suspicion of arson in relation to the Dove Stone fire, with footage on social media showing fireworks being set off close to the reservoir in the hours before the fire was first reported. Wildfire smoke drifting into Greater Manchester resulted in PM_{2.5} pollution levels peaking at 100 μg/m^{3} in Manchester city centre on 12 July, more than five times higher than the WHO safe legal limit, and 150 μg/m^{3} in residential areas of Tameside. Another moorland fire started nearby close to Penistone on 16 July, this time caused by a single-vehicle road accident where a car left the road on the Woodhead Pass and flipped over into a field before catching fire. By 21 July, pub owners in the moorlands above Sheffield said that persistent road closures due to the Peak District wildfires were affecting their trade, with the landlord of the Dog & Partridge Inn at Flouch warning that staff may have to be made redundant to cut costs due to lost income. The Woodhead Pass eventually reopened on 31 July after five weeks of wildfires in the area.

Over 60 firefighters worked to control a wildfire near Blackwater which burnt around 10 ha (25 acres) of heath and woodland. Crews in Devon tackled four separate grass fires, including one near Collaton St Mary that spread to 11 ha (27 acres). On 12 July, four appliances extinguished a fire that burnt around 10 ha (25 acres) of fields close to the Maiden Castle Sports Centre. A fire broke out in a field close to residential properties on Grange Road in Rawmarsh, Rotherham on 17 July in an apparent arson attack. On 18 July, a heathland fire destroyed tents at the Rustic Stomp festival near Wareham in Dorset. On 20 July, a wildfire which was tackled by eight appliances damaged around 12 ha (30 acres) of ancient woodland at Abbot's Wood near Polegate. On 22 July, a car fire spread to a nearby field at Ireland's Cross near Woore in Shropshire.

A significant wildfire broke out in Grenoside, Sheffield during the early hours of 23 July. The fire began in a field close to a residential area and subsequently spread rapidly into gardens, ultimately destroying a row of five terraced houses between Grimsell Crescent and Fox Hill Road and causing damage to five more homes. A large area was evacuated during the height of the fire, which was tackled by crews from eight fire engines at its peak. Two people suffered minor injuries, and the fire was brought under control during the morning. Later that day, a 59-year-old man was arrested on suspicion of arson and criminal damage offences. Local MP Marie Tidball said that her thoughts were with those who had been made homeless or otherwise affected by the fire in Sheffield. Officers from South Yorkshire Police, who had been out on routine patrol in the area and first spotted the fire, were praised for their quick actions in evacuating residents from their homes as the wildfire approached before the fire brigade were able to arrive on scene.

On 23 July a heathland fire in a rare lowland coastal heath habitat at Headon Warren on the Isle of Wight caused around 9 ha (22.2 acres) of damage. Around 80 firefighters were involved in tackling the blaze, and fire engines had to be brought across the Solent from mainland UK to help the local fire service. It took 5 days to get the blaze under control, and at its height involved the use of helicopters scooping up seawater to drop on areas that could not be reached on foot. The cause of the fire has not been definitely identified, however remains of a campfire were found by Fire and Rescue Services in the vicinity, and it is thought likely that this was the source of the blaze.

Train services between Bridlington and Scarborough on the Yorkshire coast were suspended on 28 July due to a 20 acres (8.1 ha) wildfire burning close to the railway line outside Filey. Also on 28 July, a grass fire was reported in Longley Park in Sheffield, causing significant damage to the green space. On 29 July, a large heathland fire broke out at Dunwich Heath near Leiston, Suffolk, shortly after 17:30 BST. A major incident was declared. Driven by strong winds, dry conditions, and a regional heatwave, the fire spread rapidly over an area equivalent to roughly 14 football pitches. At 22:30 BST, Suffolk Fire and Rescue Service declared a major incident due to the size and operational complexity of the blaze. Around 90 firefighters from 14 stations across the region were deployed, utilising specialist off-road Unimog vehicles, 4x4 quad bikes, and thermal imaging drones to track fire behaviour. Emergency crews established defensive lines to protect nearby properties, including Coastguard Cottages, Mount Pleasant Farm, and Cliff House Holiday Park, leading to precautionary evacuations of homes and local holidaymakers. Hundreds of holidaymakers in caravans were evacuated. Due to the heath's proximity—approximately 3 miles (5 km)—to Sizewell B nuclear power station, operations at the plant were closely monitored, though authorities confirmed there was no direct risk to the facility. No casualties were reported. The same day, wildfires broke out at grasslands in Romford and Rainham in east London. Two people were hospitalised following a blaze at Eastern Avenue West. There were 63 grass fires across Greater London.

On 30 July, a major wildfire broke out in Hornchurch. Eight fire engines and dozens of firefighters were deployed to tackle the blaze near the area of South End Road. Another fire was reported in woodlands and fields close to houses at the Hartley Brook Dike wildlife reserve in Shiregreen, Sheffield on 30 July. Multiple wildfires were burning across South Yorkshire by 31 July, including in fields off Penrith Road in Shirecliffe and in woodland close to Beighton, both in Sheffield; in grasslands close to new residential developments at Waverley in Rotherham; and on land close to Elm Wood Farm in Swallownest, just outside Sheffield. Also on 31 July, a wildfire broke out in Colchester. Firefighters tackled the blaze on Ministry of Defence land at the Middlewick Ranges on Mersea Road.

Several wildfires occurred throughout July/August in Surrey including Whitmoor Common (Worplesdon), Brentmoor Heath (West End), Hankley Common (Farnham), Riverside Nature Reserve (Guildford) and outdoor areas in Fetcham, Shackleford and Tongham. Some of these fires have been officially attributed to accidental/negligent cause but a few of them are believed to have started deliberately, with a small number of them being officially treated as arson.

=== Scotland ===
On 19 July, a wildfire broke out at Arthur's Seat in Edinburgh. The following day it was still ablaze. On 16 July, the Cairngorms National Park was evacuated after a large wildfire broke out the previous day.

=== Wales ===
On 12 July, a large wildfire on Conwy Mountain and the Sychnant Pass in north Wales resulted in evacuations, and was declared a major incident. By 23 July, an estimated 951 ha (2,350 acres) of the Rhinogydd mountains in Gwynedd were destroyed by wildfires. In South Wales, a huge wildfire on the hillside near Blaenavon lasted over three weeks. Large areas of agricultural land was destroyed. The army were called in to assist.

== August ==
=== England ===
By 1 August, the wildfire at Dunwich Heath was still being tackled. On 2 August, multiple wildfires broke out in Birmingham. The West Midlands Fire Service were called to respond. On 2 August, a wildfire damaged a "tiny forest" at Chesterton, Cambridge. On 2 August a second fire broke out in Colchester on Mersea Road on Ministry of Defence land at the Middlewick Ranges in the exact same spot and was contained quickly. On 3 August, Derbyshire Fire and Rescue Service were stood down in Glossop after fighting the Tintwistle wildfire after 23 days. The same day a wildfire near the M1 motorway at East Ardsley in West Yorkshire was extinguished. On 3 August, four homes were destroyed by fire in Crawley.

On 7 August, field fires broke out near both Bradford-on-Avon and Westbury. On 8 August, firefighters were called to a wildfire at Holme Fen in Huntingdonshire. 80 firefighters and 14 appliances attended the fire. The fire lasted a week and local Member of Parliament (MP) Sam Carling called for more government support. The same day a wildfire was tackled in Horsham.

On 9 August, a wildfire broke out in the New Forest after a vehicle fire spread to nearby heathland outside Ringwood in Hampshire. The A31 road was closed temporarily between Picket Post and Stoney Cross. Drivers were instructed to abandon their cars and leave the area on foot. The Hampshire and Isle of Wight Fire and Rescue sent 20 fire engines to respond. Also on 9 August, a wildfire at Strawberry Hill Heath near Mansfield that had been smouldering underground since early July re-ignited significantly, prompting a response from the Nottinghamshire Fire and Rescue Service; around 9 acres (3.6 ha) of woodland was destroyed, and the cause could not be determined.

On 10 August, the Dunwich Heath wildfire officially ended and was eradicated.

On 11 August, wildfires broke out in Mawgan Porth and Porth in Cornwall. On 12 August, a fire at Crows-an-Wra in the west of Cornwall led to the closure of Land's End Airport; Cornwall Fire and Rescue Service said that four fire engines were attending and National Trust workers rounded up and evacuated grazing horses in the area. A house and grassland were burned in Kings Norton, Birmingham.

On 12 August, a Cobra meeting was held on the wildfires. Prime Minister Andy Burnham described Britain as a "tinder box". The military have been deployed to aid the firefighting efforts.

On 13 August, multiple fires broke out across England including in the West Midlands. It was the hottest day of the year. A wildfire covering about 16 hectares near a golf course in Stourbridge. Dozens of firefighters attended the scene near Stourbridge golf course. Three people were hospitalised. Multiple homes were destroyed by fire. The A451 road was blocked between Kidderminster and Stourbridge. Firefighters were called to the B&M on Weavers Wharf in Kidderminster. Homes were damaged by fire in the Sandyford area of Stoke-on-Trent. Warwickshire Fire and Rescue Service responded to a large fire in Salford Priors, Stratford-upon-Avon. A large fire also broke out around Price Avenue in Tamworth.

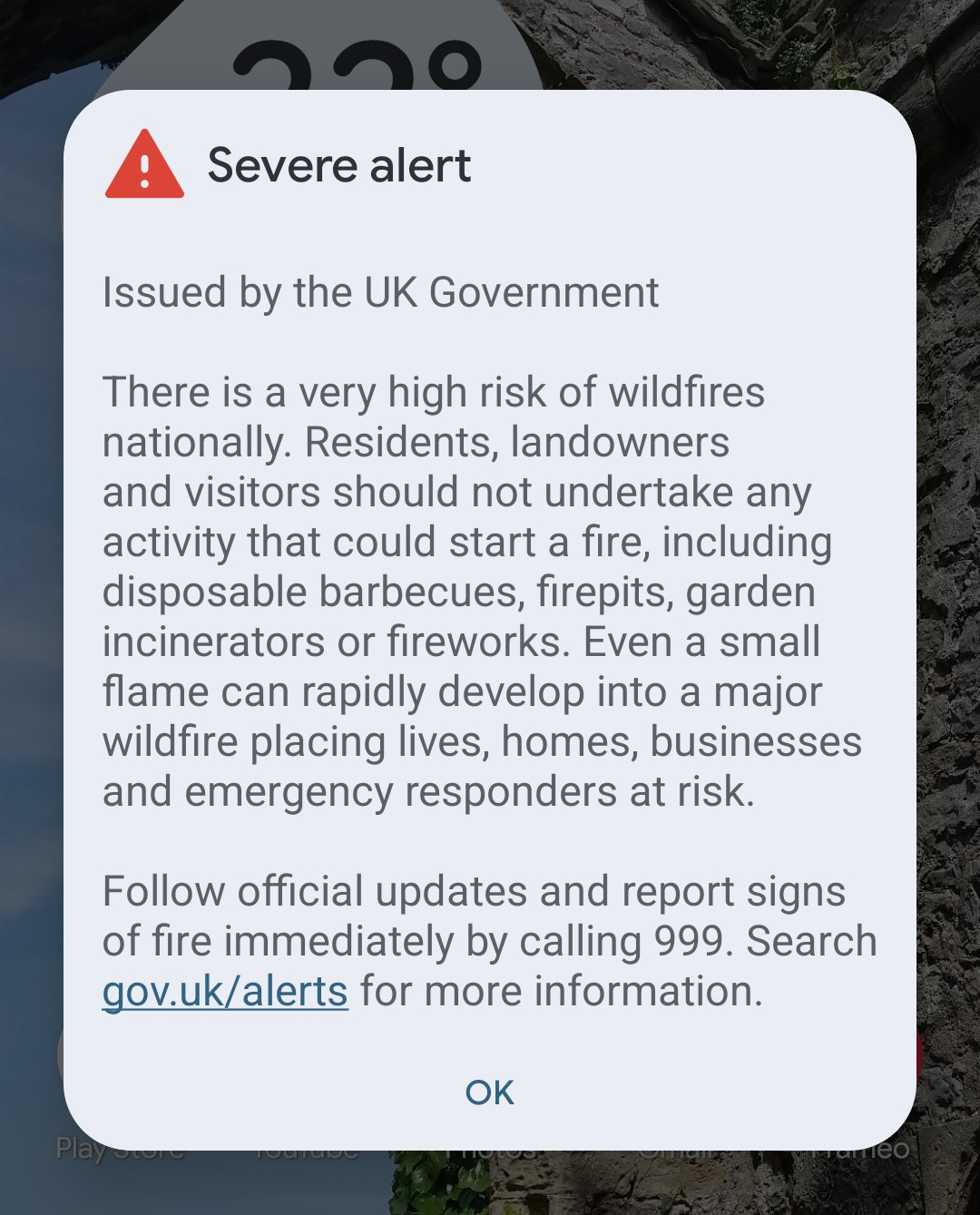
On 14 August, an alert was sent to phones in England and Wales about the risk of wildfires.

A wildfire on moorland was put out near Holmfirth Road in Oldham. A wildfire broke out at Mousehold Heath in Norfolk. Large plumes of smoke were spotted across Norwich. Norfolk Fire and Rescue Service declared a major incident. A fire was reported at a school in Shipdham. A large grassland fire broke out at Westbury White Horse in Wiltshire. A garden fire was put out in Trowbridge. In Dorset, a wildfire broke out at Bishop's Caundle between Sturminster Newton and Sherborne. Dorset & Wiltshire Fire and Rescue Service declared a major incident. A wildfire ravaged Riverside Nature Reserve, between the River Wey and the A3 road, in Guildford, Surrey. The Rural Life Living Museum in Surrey cancelled the steam rally due to the fire risk. An unattended barbeque reportedly sparked a blaze at Sefton Park in Liverpool.

On 14 August, the government issued a temporary ban on disposable barbecues. On the same day, an emergency alert was issued to phones in England and Wales warning of risk of wildfires. Judith Blake was appointed Fire Minister amid the crisis.

On 15 August, a wildfire broke out in Worcestershire. Hereford and Worcester Fire and Rescue Service attended to the scene at Maypole Piece in Bewdley. On 16 August, firefighters tackled a large fire at a warehouse in Harwich. The same day residents in Stourbridge were allowed to return to their properties.

=== Wales ===
On 4 August, a wildfire burned at Llanwonno in the Rhondda Valley in South Wales. South Wales Fire and Rescue Service attended to the scene owned by the Welsh Government Woodland Estate. A rest area was set up for those affected. The fires are suspected to have been started deliberately.

On 14 August, a wildfire was reported in Carmarthenshire. A major incident was declared near the market town of Llandovery and dozens of homes were evacuated.

=== Isle of Man ===
On 13 August, two firefighters were injured in a fire at Castletown and Malew fire and ambulance station, near the Isle of Man Airport at Ronaldsway.

== See also ==
- 2026 Chernobyl exclusion zone wildfires (Ukraine)
- 2026 France wildfires
- 2026 Krokstadelva fire (Norway)
- 2026 Spain wildfires
- Wildfires in 2026
