= 2026 United Kingdom heatwaves =

Meteorological history
- Duration: 22 May 2026 – 15 August 2026
- Heat wave
- Max temp: 38.2 °C (100.8 °F), recorded at Hartpury College, Gloucestershire on 13 August 2026

Overall effects
- Fatalities: May and June: 2,700+ (estimate); 2,877 (UKHSA estimate)
- Areas affected: United Kingdom

Plot of daily maximum (red) and minimum (blue) temperatures in London from May to August 2026

During 2026, parts of the United Kingdom were severely affected by a series of record-breaking heatwaves, forming the western extent of a broader sequence of extreme heat events across Western and Central Europe.

The first heatwave started on 22 May and saw the country's record for hottest day during May broken on 25 May when 34.8 °C (94.6 °F) was recorded at Kew Gardens in London, surpassing the previous record of 32.8 °C (91.0 °F) set in 1922 by 2 °C (3.6 °F); this record was broken again when 35.1 °C (95.2 °F) was recorded in the same location the following day. Other records which were broken included the hottest May day in Guernsey, Jersey and Wales, as well as the highest minimum May temperature in the UK. Experts estimated that around 550 people died during this period of extreme heat.

The second heatwave started on 19 June and saw more records broken, including that for hottest day during June when 38.0 °C (100.4 °F) was recorded in Lingwood, Norfolk on 26 June, which is also the fifth hottest day in the UK ever. The previous record for June of 35.6 °C (96.1 °F) was set in 1957 and 1976. A further 2,200 deaths were estimated to have occurred during this heatwave, bringing the total to roughly 2,700.

A third heatwave began on 4 July, with temperatures peaking at 35.5 °C (95.9 °F) in Wisley, Surrey, on 9 July. This marked the first year when temperatures have reached 35 °C (95 °F) in three separate months, whilst the records for most days reaching both 34 °C (93 °F) and 35 °C (95 °F) in a single year were broken at nine and six respectively.

A fourth, shorter heatwave began on 28 July, occurring alongside severely dry conditions which prompted the Environment Agency to declare a drought across more than half of England and all of Wales.

A fifth heatwave began on 2 August, with a sixth slightly longer heatwave beginning on 9 August.

== Background ==
The Met Office considers a heatwave to be when temperatures on three consecutive days surpass 25–28 °C (77–82 °F), depending on the location within the United Kingdom. The UK Health Security Agency (UKHSA) issues heat-health alerts to provide warning when high temperatures are expected to impact the population's health and wellbeing; the core alerting system runs from 1 June to 30 September, with alerts outside of this core period described as "extraordinary".

== Late May heatwave ==
2026 United Kingdom heatwaves
Meteorological history
- Duration: 22–31 May 2026
- Heat event
- Max temp: 35.1 °C (95.2 °F), recorded at Kew Gardens on 26 May

Overall effects
- Fatalities: 550 (21–29 May, estimate); 753 (24–27 May, UKHSA estimate)
- Areas affected: United Kingdom

On 22 May, the UKHSA issued yellow heat-health alerts for the East Midlands, East of England, London, South East and West Midlands regions, in place from 9 a.m. that day. These alerts were escalated to amber from 2 p.m. as further yellow alerts were issued for the remaining regions of England; all alerts were set to remain in place until 5 p.m. on 27 May.

The first areas of the country met heatwave conditions on 24 May, when temperature thresholds were reached in eight locations in Essex, London, Oxfordshire and Suffolk. England, Wales and all recorded their highest temperatures of the year so far at 32.3 °C (90.1 °F) in Kew Gardens, 27.4 °C (81.3 °F) in Cardiff and 23.4 °C (74.1 °F) in Armagh; Scotland reached 23.5 °C (74.3 °F) in Edinburgh, just short of a high recorded earlier in May. Jersey's record for the hottest May day ever was broken as temperatures reached 29.2 °C (84.6 °F) in St Helier, breaking the previous record of 28.9 °C (84.0 °F) set in 2003.

Overnight temperatures in Kenley did not fall below 19.4 °C (66.9 °F), breaking the record for highest minimum May temperature; the previous record of 18.9 °C (66.0 °F) was set in Folkestone in 1944. The record for the hottest May day in the United Kingdom was broken on 25 May after 34.8 °C (94.6 °F) was recorded in Kew Gardens, surpassing the previous record of 32.8 °C (91.0 °F), which was reached in 1922 and 1944, by a whole 2 °C (3.6 °F); this also broke the record for hottest bank holiday Monday as it exceeded the 33.3 °C (91.9 °F) recorded on the August Bank Holiday in 2019. Wales also saw its hottest May day on record as temperatures reached 32.2 °C (90.0 °F) at Hawarden Airport, surpassing the previous record of 30.6 °C (87.1 °F) set in Newport in 1944. Northern Ireland and Scotland saw their warmest days of the year so far, with temperatures of 25.8 °C (78.4 °F) and 25.5 °C (77.9 °F) being recorded in Derrylin and Charterhall, respectively. The May record for Jersey was broken again as temperatures reached 31.9 °C (89.4 °F), whilst a temperature of 30.7 °C (87.3 °F) broke Guernsey's previous record of 26.8 °C (80.2 °F).

The country saw a tropical night – one where temperatures do not fall below 20 °C (68 °F) – on 26 May, with a minimum temperature of 21.3 °C (70.3 °F) recorded at Kenley Airfield, breaking the record for highest minimum May temperature again. The heat-health alert in South West England was upgraded to amber, whilst all warnings were extended to 5 p.m. on 28 May. The British record for hottest May day was surpassed again, with temperatures peaking at 35.1 °C (95.2 °F) in Kew Gardens. A temperature of 32.9 °C (91.2 °F) in Bute Park also broke Wales's record again. Records in the Channel Islands were also broken again as temperatures continued to rise for a third consecutive day, with 34.2 °C (93.6 °F) and 31.5 °C (88.7 °F) recorded in Jersey and Guernsey, respectively.

On 1 June, the Met Office said provisional statistics showed that both England and Wales had experienced their warmest springs on record with mean temperatures of 10.41 °C (50.74 °F) and 9.73 °C (49.51 °F) respectively, whilst the UK as a whole saw its third at 9.33 °C (48.79 °F); Scotland saw its sixth warmest at 7.46 °C (45.43 °F) and Northern Ireland saw its tenth at 9.06 °C (48.31 °F). All three months of spring ranked within the country's top ten warmest, with March ranking joint tenth, April seventh, and May joint third, whilst 40 counties saw their warmest spring on record.

=== Impact ===
An estimate from Imperial College London, the London School of Hygiene and Tropical Medicine and the Met Office published in mid-July placed the number of deaths from the heat between 21 and 29 May at around 550. An interim report on heat-associated deaths by the UK Health Security Agency using a different methodology estimated that there were 753 deaths linked to the May heatwave. Between 24 and 31 May, at least 20 people died in water-related incidents across the country, including 14 children, prompting water safety experts to urge the government to treat drownings as a "public health disaster".

The heatwave disrupted numerous services, including public transport and water supply. South East Water first reported supply issues in the villages of Challock, Charing and Molash on 23 May, with a peak of around 800 properties affected before the issue was resolved on 26 May. Separate issues affected 168 properties in Eastbourne and around 20 homes in Ulcombe, whilst a failed pump disrupted supplies to 64 properties in Radfall. By 27 May, around 18,000 properties were facing water supply disruptions across Kent in areas including Ashford, Maidstone and Whitstable.

Rail transport was severely disrupted, with South Western Railway saying all lines were being affected by heat-related speed restrictions, multiple signalling faults and track defects on 26 May. Heat-related incidents between Peterborough and Stevenage disrupted services on some lines between the former and London Kings Cross, whilst a problem with equipment at Deptford meant trains were unable to call at one of its platforms. Avanti West Coast services were hit by points and signalling failures, blocking some lines at London Euston as well as between Milton Keynes Central and Watford Junction, whilst high track temperatures led to speed restrictions between the latter and Clapham Junction and Euston. Speed restrictions also affected services between London Liverpool Street and Cheshunt and Stratford, whilst several lines of the London Underground and Overground were disrupted.

== Mid/Late June heatwave ==
2026 United Kingdom heatwaves
Meteorological history
- Duration: 19–28 June 2026
- Heat event
- Max temp: 38.0 °C (100.4 °F), recorded at Lingwood on 26 June

Overall effects
- Fatalities: 2,200 (21–28 June, estimate); 2,124 (21–28 June, UKHSA estimate)
- Areas affected: United Kingdom

On 18 June, the UKHSA issued amber heat-health alerts for the East of England, London, South East and South West regions, with yellow alerts for the East Midlands and West Midlands, in place until 8 p.m. on 23 June. On 20 June, the UKHSA announced that, from 11 a.m. on 22 June, the East and West Midlands would be under amber alerts, with yellow alerts issued for the North East, North West and Yorkshire and the Humber; all alerts were set to remain in place until midnight on 24 June. They announced the following day that the alerts for the North West and Yorkshire and the Humber would be upgraded to amber, with all alerts in place until 11 p.m. on 26 June. On 22 June, they announced that red alerts would be in place for the East Midlands, East of England, London, South East, South West and West Midlands from 1 a.m. on 24 June to 11 p.m. on 25 June, marking only the second time this level of warning has been issued, the first being during the heatwave in July 2022; further amber alerts were issued for the remaining regions of England. These alerts were extended until 11 p.m. on 26 June two days later.

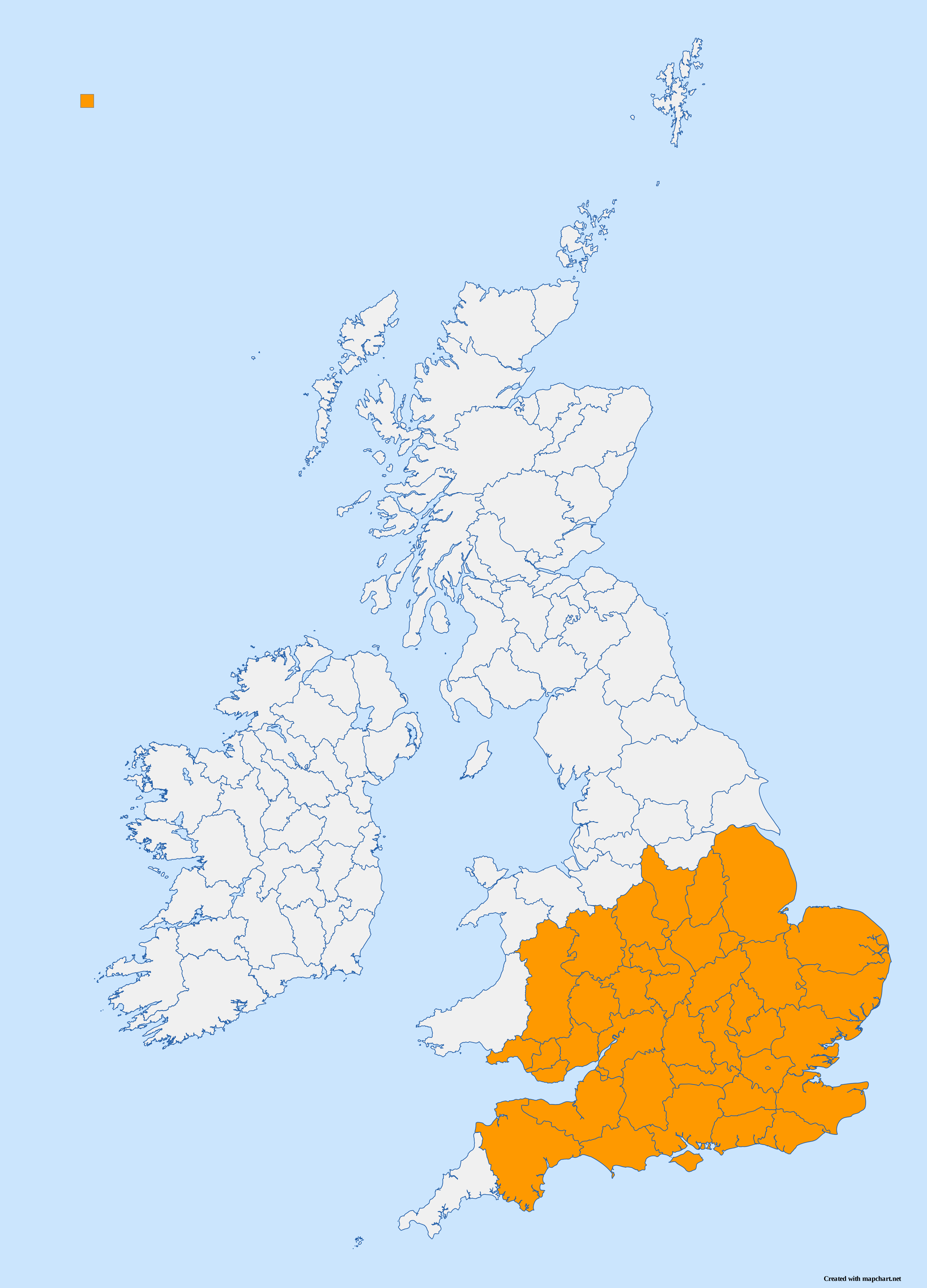
22–23 June

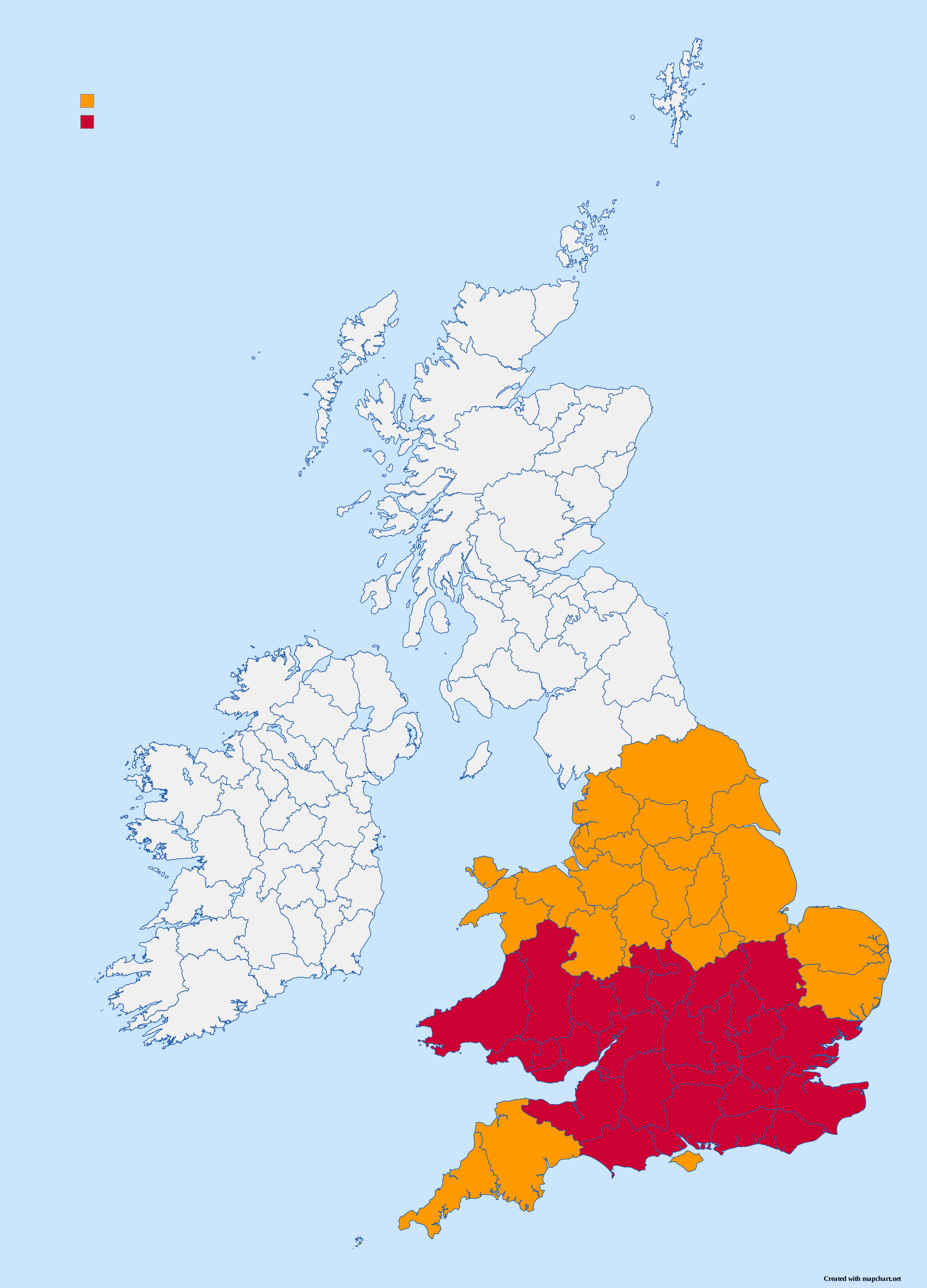
24–25 June

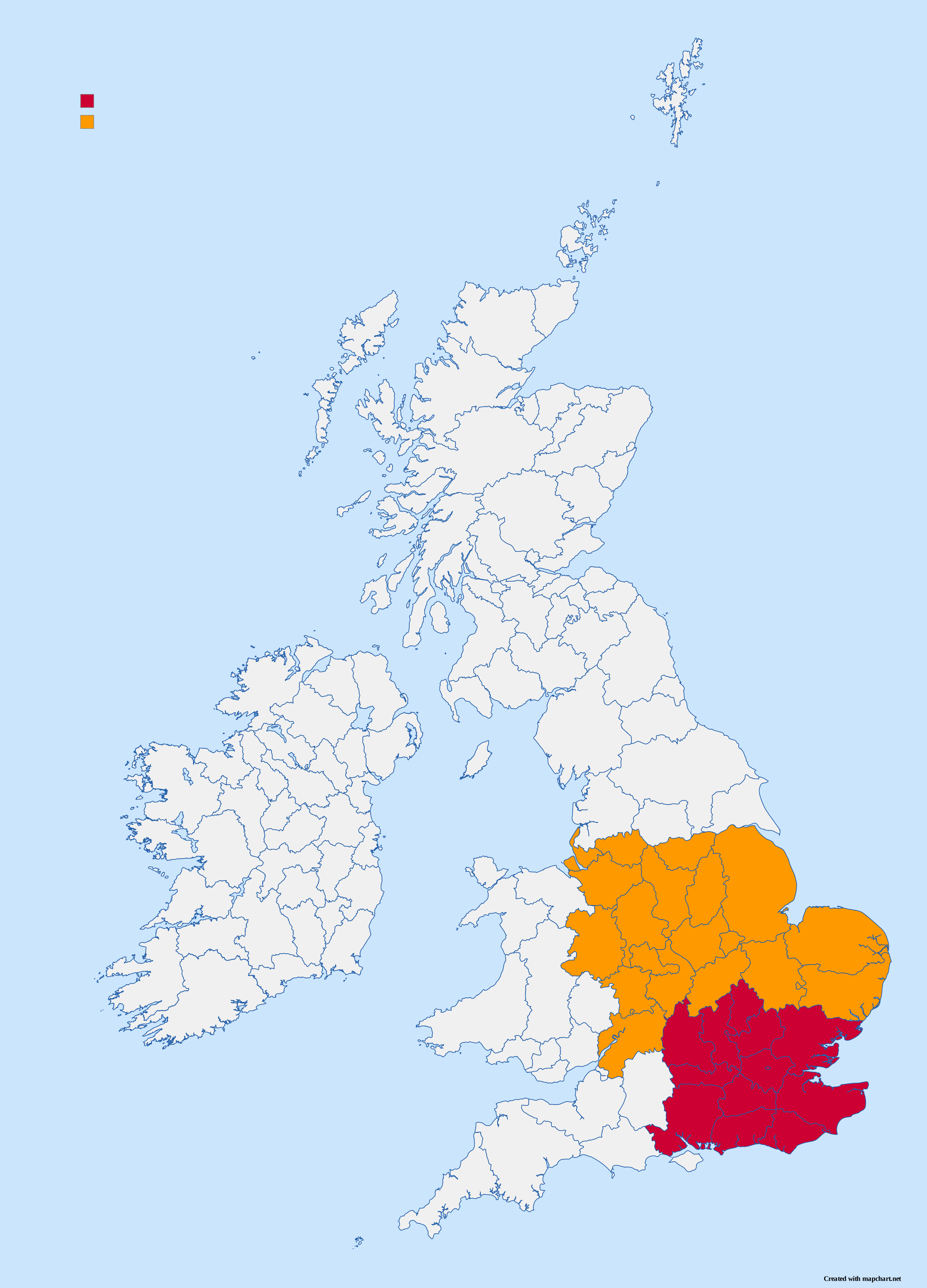
26 June

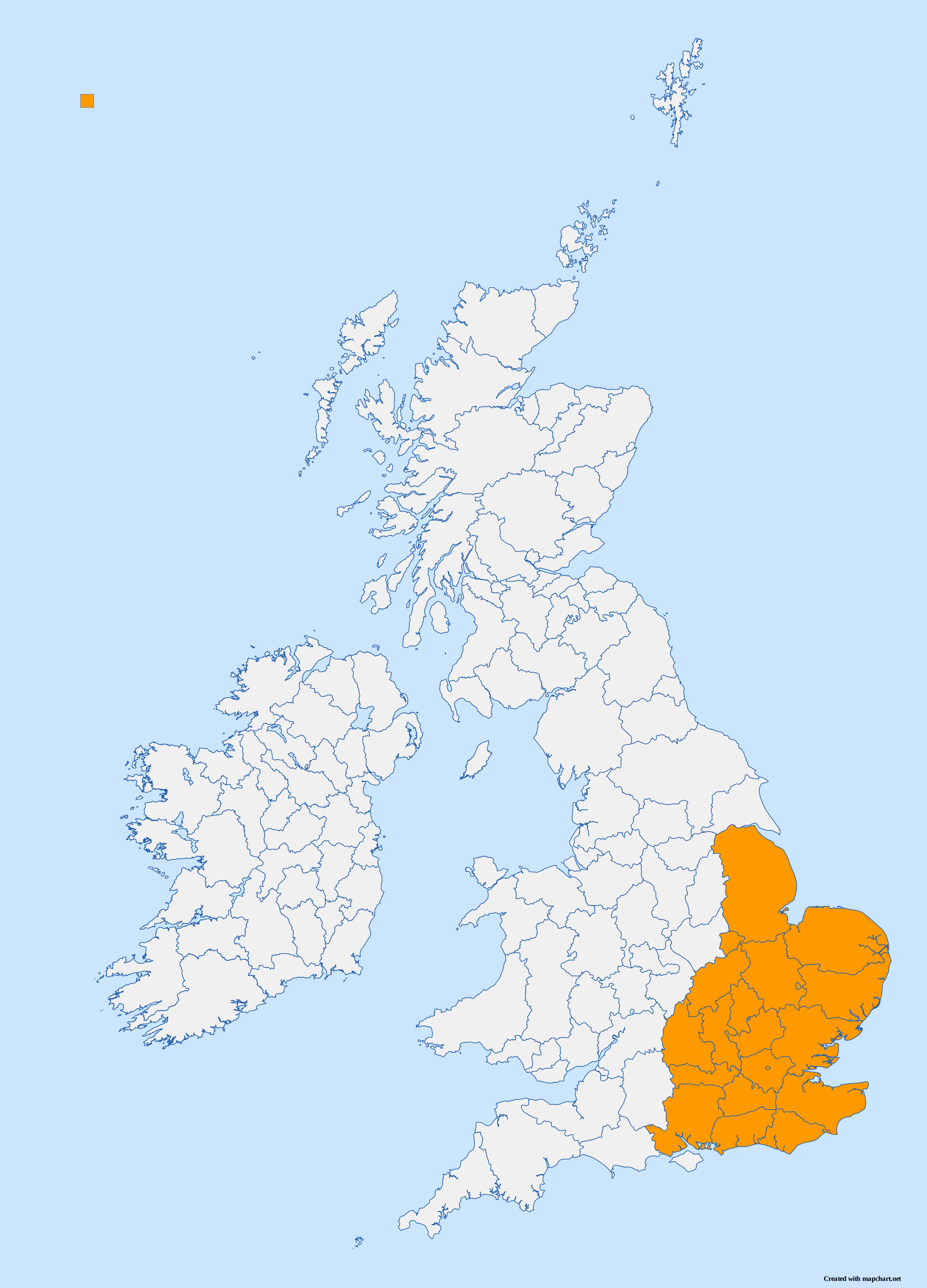
27–28 June

Extreme heat warnings issued by the Met Office

The Met Office issued several weather warnings for extreme heat: an amber warning covered large parts England and Wales from 1 a.m. on 22 to midnight on 23 June; another amber warning covered a larger area for all of 24 and 25 June; a red warning covered parts England and Wales from 9 a.m. on 24 June to midnight on 25 June; an amber warning covered large parts of England all day on 26 June; another red warning covered parts of southern and eastern England from midnight to 9 p.m. on 26 June; and an amber warning covered parts of eastern England from midnight on 27 June to 9 a.m. on 28 June. Since their introduction in 2021, extreme heat warnings are rarely issued, with the first of this heatwave's amber warnings being only the sixth issued, and the red warning the first in Wales and only the second nationally; this heatwave also marked the first time red warnings for extreme heat had been issued on three consecutive days.

On 21 June, the first areas of the country met heatwave conditions as temperatures surpassed 27 °C (81 °F) for the third consecutive day in Writtle, with temperatures peaking at 31.8 °C (89.2 °F) at Heathrow Airport. The following day the highest temperature was 32.5 °C (90.5 °F), recorded in Yeovilton. Thunderstorms across parts of southern England that evening prompted a yellow weather warning, with flash flooding, power cuts, travel disruption and several house fires caused by the storms, including one in Bristol that forced the evacuation of multiple homes.

Many parts of the country experienced a tropical night, with the Welsh record for highest minimum June temperature broken in St Athan when readings did not fall below 20.3 °C (68.5 °F). On 23 June, temperatures peaked at 34.6 °C (94.3 °F) in Wisley, with 32.3 °C (90.1 °F) recorded in Wales as both Scotland and Northern Ireland saw their hottest days of the year so far at 29.0 °C (84.2 °F) in Dyce and 28.1 °C (82.6 °F) in Katesbridge. More areas experienced another tropical night, with the highest overnight low of 22.3 °C (72.1 °F) recorded at RAF Brize Norton. The record for the hottest June day in the United Kingdom was broken on 24 June after 36.1 °C (97.0 °F) was recorded in Gosport, surpassing the previous record of 35.6 °C (96.1 °F) set in 1957 and equalled in 1976. Wales saw its hottest day of the year so far when 33.3 °C (91.9 °F) was recorded at Bute Park in Cardiff. Jersey's record for hottest June temperature was broken when 37.2 °C (99.0 °F) was recorded, surpassing the previous record of 33.4 °C (92.1 °F) set in 2025 by almost 4 °C (7.2 °F); this is also the second highest temperature ever recorded on the island.

The record for highest minimum June temperature was broken after temperatures only fell to 23.5 °C (74.3 °F) in Cardiff, breaking both the Welsh and UK records, whilst the English record was also broken with a minimum temperature of 23.0 °C (73.4 °F) recorded in Plymouth. On 25 June, the record for hottest June day was broken again as temperatures reached 37.3 °C (99.1 °F) at Yeovilton in Somerset. Wales also saw its hottest June day on record after 35.6 °C (96.1 °F) was recorded at Bute Park, surpassing the previous record of 33.7 °C (92.7 °F) from 2000; Scotland and Northern Ireland saw their hottest days of the year so far at 31.2 °C (88.2 °F) in Threave and 30 °C (86 °F) in Castlederg. The Channel Islands saw their hottest day on record when 39.3 °C (102.7 °F) was recorded in Jersey, whilst Guernsey also had its hottest day on record at 36.4 °C (97.5 °F). For the third consecutive day, the record for hottest June day was broken again on 26 June after 38.0 °C (100.4 °F) was recorded at Lingwood in Norfolk. However, the highest temperatures for the other three countries of the UK started to decrease, with Wales seeing 35.1 °C (95.2 °F) in Hawarden, Scotland seeing 29.2 °C (84.6 °F) in Eskdalemuir, and Northern Ireland seeing 25.6 °C (78.1 °F) in Katesbridge.

On 1 July, the Met Office said provisional statistics showed that England had its warmest June on record with a mean temperature of 17.1 °C (62.8 °F), whilst Wales and the UK as a whole saw their second at 15.9 °C (60.6 °F) and 15.6 °C (60.1 °F) respectively; Scotland and Northern Ireland saw their fourth warmest at 13.0 °C (55.4 °F) and 14.6 °C (58.3 °F). The UK, England and Wales all surpassed their records for highest average minimum June temperatures by at least 0.5 °C (0.90 °F), with Scotland equalling its record and Northern Ireland experiencing its second warmest.

=== Impact ===
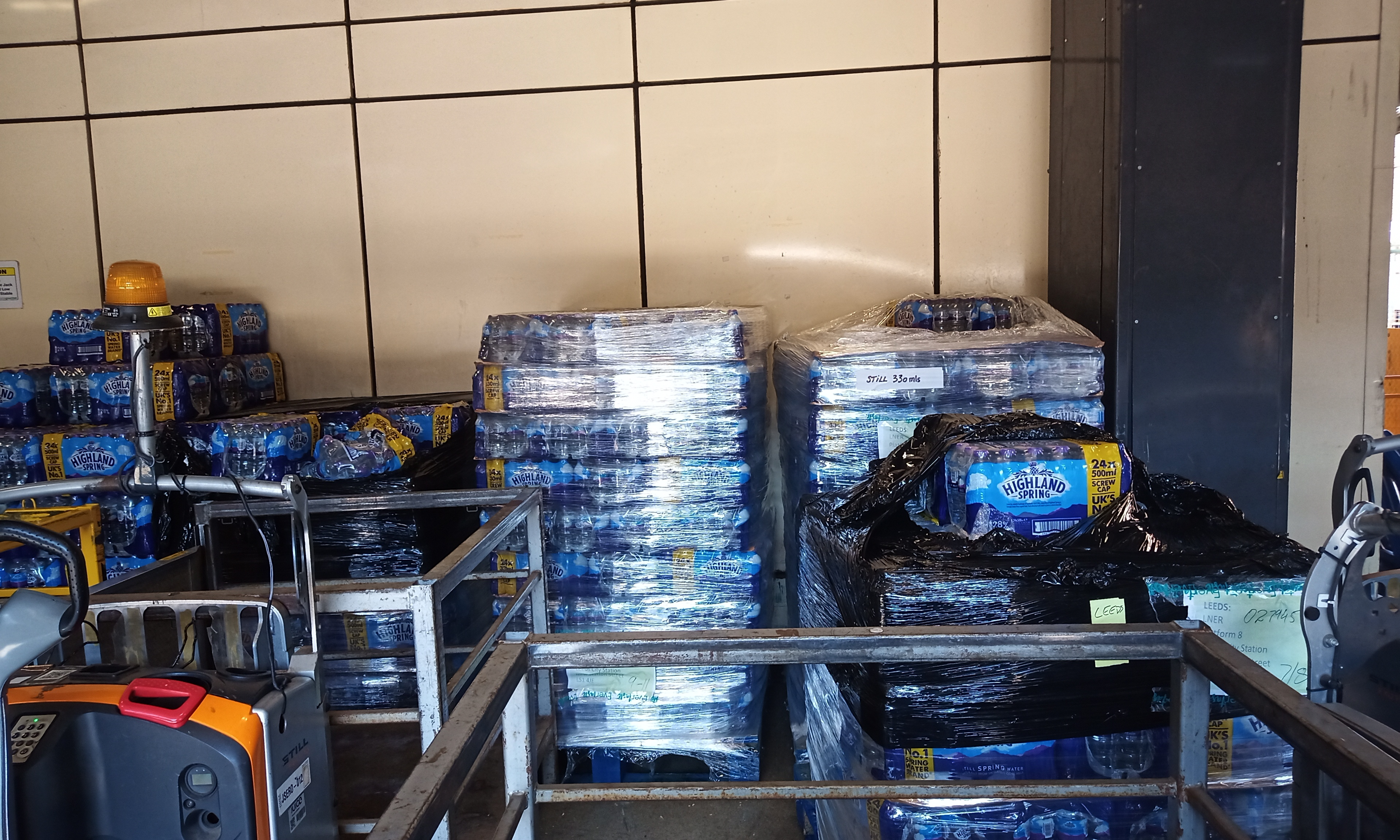
Bottled water for commuters at Leeds City railway station.

The study by the Imperial College London, the London School of Hygiene and Tropical Medicine and the Met Office estimated that 2,200 heat-related deaths took place between 18 and 28 June. The UKHSA interim report estimated there were 2,124 heat-associated deaths in 21 to 28 June. At least five people died in water-related incidents during the heatwave. On 24 June, a 50-year-old man died after entering the water at Aberavon Beach in south Wales. On 26 June, the body of a 13-year-old boy was recovered from a lake in Syston after he was reported missing the previous day. On 26 June, a 69-year-old man died after getting into difficulty in the water at Clacton-on-Sea. On 27 June, the body of a 15-year-old boy last seen on 24 June was recovered from Testwood Lakes near Southampton, whilst that of a 22-year-old man last seen in the early hours of the previous day was recovered from the River Severn in Shrewsbury.

On 22 June, several railway companies offered warnings to passengers, including Chiltern Railways who advised passengers to avoid travel where possible; Transport for West Midlands warned disruption to services was likely as Severn Valley Railway announced services would be cancelled from 24 June, with plans to resume after 27 June. National Rail asked customers to travel only if "absolutely necessary" during the peak of the heatwave, with some services by the Great Western Railway and Transport for Wales being cancelled. A critical incident was declared at East Surrey Hospital on 22 June due to heightened demand, with the situation being exacerbated by the heat. Some South East Water customers saw further disruption to their water supply, with issues reported in Crawley and Ulcombe.

On 24 June, more than ten people were treated in hospital for heat-related illnesses after being stuck in traffic for many hours on the M25 motorway following a collision between a van and a lorry. The Queen Alexandra Hospital in Portsmouth declared a critical incident as the extreme heat caused some of their cooling units to fail. The engines of one of Hovertravel's vehicles in Southsea started smoking amid the heatwave, forcing the vessel and its 31 passengers to be evacuated. Due to the extreme heat, over 1,000 schools across England and Wales were closed or sent pupils home early. Over 800 homes lost power in the Crediton, Chulmleigh and North Tawton areas of Devon as the hot weather put pressure on the electricity network. The Dartmoor National Park Authority warned of a heightened risk of wildfires around Dartmoor due to the extremely dry conditions and heat. Greenpeace urged caution to Londoners as surface temperatures of between 50–60 °C (122–140 °F) were recorded around the city, peaking at 65 °C (149 °F) at a roadworks in Holborn.

On 25 June, South East Water announced a hosepipe ban for around 850,000 customers across Kent, asking them to adhere to it "immediately" despite it not legally coming into force until 3 July. Several NHS foundation trusts and hospitals declared critical incidents as the heat led to a surge in admissions and the failure of IT systems and machines including air conditioning units, linear accelerators and MRI scanners. Trains were suspended between Coventry and Leamington Spa after a rail buckled in the extreme temperatures.

The London Ambulance Service declared a critical incident on 26 June after reporting that it had been its busiest day on record, receiving 8,869 calls and responding to a record 688 Category 1 emergencies, which includes the most serious incidents such as cardiac arrests. South Central Ambulance Service upgraded its critical incident to a major incident as pressure on their services continued to worsen amid the extreme temperatures. The South Western Ambulance Service also saw its busiest day on record, responding to 4,350 incidents; its previous busiest day had came only a month prior when it responded to 3,941 callouts during the May heatwave.

== July heatwave ==
2026 United Kingdom heatwaves
Meteorological history
- Duration: 4–26 July 2026
- Heat event
- Max temp: 35.5 °C (95.9 °F), recorded at Wisley on 9 July

Overall effects
- Areas affected: United Kingdom

On 3 July, the UKHSA issued yellow heat health alerts for the East Midlands, East of England, London, South East and South West regions, in place from midday on 4 July to 5 a.m. on 8 July; this alert was later extended to 8 p.m. on 11 July, also covering the West Midlands. On 6 July, these alerts were upgraded to amber, in force from 9 a.m. on 8 July to 9 p.m. on 12 July, whilst yellow alerts were issued for the remaining regions of England. From midday on 9 July, the alerts for North West England and Yorkshire and the Humber were escalated to amber. On 12 July, the amber alerts for South West England and the West Midlands were extended to 9 p.m. on 15 July, whilst all other regions except from North East England and Yorkshire and the Humber were under yellow alerts for the same period. These alerts were extended further, with these regions remaining under yellow alerts until 9 p.m. on 17 July.

The first areas of England met heatwave conditions during the morning of 6 July as temperatures in parts of south-eastern England exceeded 28 °C (82 °F) for the third consecutive day; temperatures that day peaked at 34.0 °C (93.2 °F) in Teddington. The following day more areas met heatwave criteria, although peak temperatures decreased with a maximum of 32.4 °C (90.3 °F) recorded at both Frittenden and Teddington. On 8 July, temperatures peaked at 33.8 °C (92.8 °F) at Heathrow Airport, whilst Wales saw a peak of 31.2 °C (88.2 °F) at Bute Park, Scotland a peak of 29.0 °C (84.2 °F) at Aboyne, and Northern Ireland a peak of 27.1 °C (80.8 °F) at Helen's Bay. The Met Office warned of an "extreme" marine heatwave affecting parts of the English Channel and North Sea that could be detrimental to some marine life including seagrasses and shellfish, with sea temperatures reaching 4–5 °C (7.2–9.0 °F) above average. On 9 July, temperatures peaked at 35.5 °C (95.9 °F) in Wisley, making it the eighth day of the year when temperatures exceeded 34 °C (93 °F), breaking the previous record of seven set in 1976 and equalled in 2020. The highest temperature recorded in Wales was 31.3 °C (88.3 °F) at Bute Park, as Scotland saw highs of 29.3 °C (84.7 °F) at Charterhall and Northern Ireland reached 27.5 °C (81.5 °F) at Killowen. Five locations experienced a tropical night, with a minimum temperature of 21.3 °C (70.3 °F) reported at Heathrow.

On 10 July, a peak temperature of 35.2 °C (95.4 °F) was recorded at Coton in the Elms in Derbyshire, breaking the record for the most days when temperatures have reached 35 °C (95 °F) at six and marking the ninth day of temperatures over 34 °C (93 °F). Maximum temperatures reached 32.3 °C (90.1 °F) on 11 July, increasing slightly to 32.6 °C (90.7 °F) on 12 July, then decreasing to 30.1 °C (86.2 °F) on 13 July; all of these temperatures were recorded at Hurn. On 14 July, a peak of 30.4 °C (86.7 °F) was recorded at Heathrow, marking the tenth consecutive day of temperatures over 30 °C (86 °F); this is the most since 2006 which saw temperatures exceed this threshold for 14 days in a row.

On 15 July, temperatures peaked at 30.5 °C (86.9 °F) at Hurn, followed by 30.6 °C (87.1 °F) at Merryfield the following day. On 17 July, temperatures reached 31.3 °C (88.3 °F) at Ross-on-Wye, marking the 13th consecutive day of temperatures over 30 °C (86 °F); this streak ended on 18 July, with a maximum temperature of 27.4 °C (81.3 °F) recorded at Exeter. Temperatures on 19 July peaked at 26.6 °C (79.9 °F) at Usk, with a peak of 28.6 °C (83.5 °F) recorded at Pershore on 20 July. The majority of the country was no longer in a heatwave by this day as temperatures had failed to reach heatwave criteria, however some locations remained in an official heatwave more than a week after: Exeter and Usk were the final locations to be in a heatwave, which ended on 26 July when temperatures fell below their threshold after 21 consecutive days.

=== Impact ===
On 6 July, the London Fire Brigade reported its highest number of emergency calls so far that year at 1,251, with crews attending 13 separate blazes including one in Wood Green that saw 12 engines and 80 firefighters on scene for over 12 hours. Several c2c rail services in southern Essex were cancelled on 9 July as extreme temperatures forced speed restrictions, with disruption continuing into the following day. By 11 July, over eight million households across the country were under hosepipe bans after Affinity Water, Anglian Water, Cambridge Water, South East Water and Southern Water all introduced restrictions for customers in southern and eastern in England. Severn Trent Water, which serves over 8 million people, reported its highest demand on record on 11 July at almost 2.4 billion litres (630 million US gallons), which is around 400 million more than usual each day. On 21 July, Thames Water announced that a hosepipe ban affecting over 10 million customers would come into effect from 23 July. Increased temperatures caused the ground to expand and put greater pressure on water mains, with older infrastructure more likely to break; Bristol Water reported a 109% increase in burst water mains in June and July.

== Late July heatwave ==
2026 United Kingdom heatwaves
Meteorological history
- Duration: 28–30 July 2026
- Heat event
- Max temp: 35.2 °C (95.4 °F), recorded at Writtle on 29th July

Overall effects
- Areas affected: United Kingdom

On 28 July, a fourth heatwave of the summer began to affect the UK, with maximum temperatures reaching 29–30 °C (84–86 °F) across London and parts of southern England. The heat intensified on 29 July, with temperatures peaking between 33 °C (91 °F) and 35 °C (95 °F) in parts of South East England.

In response to the rising temperatures, the UK Health Security Agency (UKHSA) issued an amber heat-health alert covering London, the East Midlands, East of England, and South East England, effective from 29 July to 30 July. Yellow heat-health alerts were maintained for Yorkshire and the Humber, West Midlands, and South West regions.

=== Impact ===
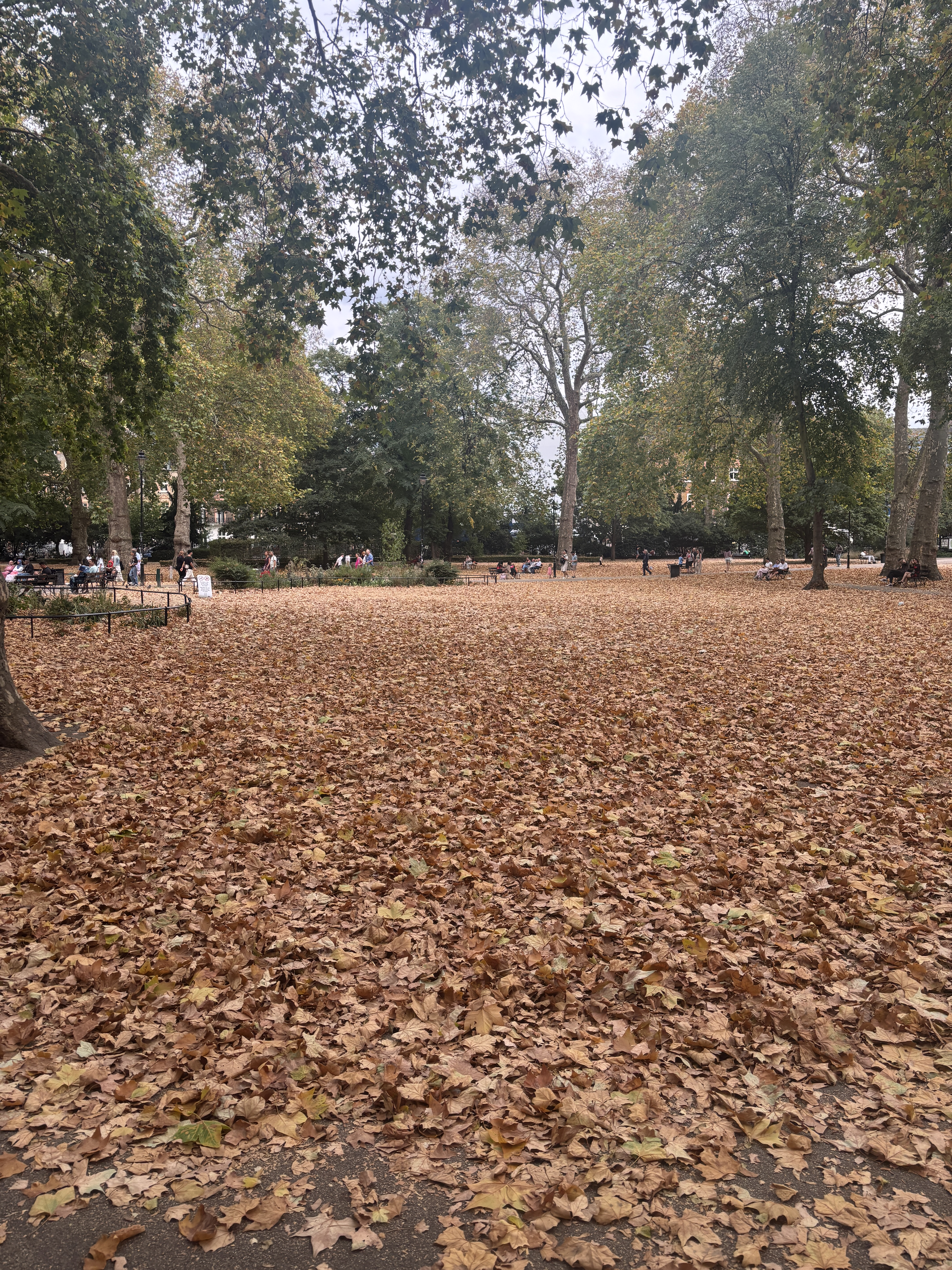
Leaves from trees cover the ground in Russell Square, London, August 2026

Extremely dry ground conditions heightened wildfire risks across England and Wales. Operations continued at a major wildfire affecting Tintwistle Moor in Derbyshire and adjacent areas of Greater Manchester, which burned an estimated 1250 football pitches of peat and moorland and required multi-agency deployments alongside closures of the A628 Woodhead Pass.

The intense heat spike exacerbated severely dry conditions across the country, leading the Environment Agency to officially declare that a large swathe of central, eastern, and southern England was experiencing a rapidly developing "flash drought". Despite a very wet winter, the flash drought developed quickly due to a combination of record-low rainfall and exceptionally high temperatures, leaving southern England with just 1% of its expected monthly rainfall by late July. The declaration moved seven of the agency's 14 operational areas into official drought status, prompting enhanced water resource monitoring, early agricultural crop harvests, and widespread water-use restrictions affecting roughly 23 million customers.

A drought was declared across the whole of Wales on 30 July, after experiencing its driest July for 190 years.

== Early August heatwave ==
2026 United Kingdom heatwaves
Meteorological history
- Duration: 3–5 August 2026
- Heat event
- Max temp: 33.5 °C (92.3 °F), recorded at Wisley on 4th August

Overall effects
- Areas affected: United Kingdom

On 2 August, high temperatures began re-building across parts of England and Wales, marking the start of a fifth heatwave for the summer. The heat intensified on 3 August, with maximum temperatures forecast to reach up to 35 °C (95 °F) in South East England and London, whilst wider areas of central and southern England recorded temperatures in the upper-20s or low-30s °C (low- to high-80s °F).

In response to the building heat, the UK Health Security Agency (UKHSA) issued Amber Heat-Health Alerts covering London, the East Midlands, East of England, and South East England, effective from 9:00 a.m. on 3 August until 9:00 a.m. on 5 August. Yellow heat-health alerts were issued for the North West, Yorkshire and the Humber, West Midlands, and South West regions.

=== Impacts ===
The fifth heatwave further compounded severe drought conditions across England and Wales, with daytime temperatures during the early August spell widely peaking between 32 °C (90 °F) and 35 °C (95 °F) in southern regions, and reaching the mid-to-high twenties across the Midlands and North. This spell added to the year's record-breaking thermal extremes, following earlier monthly peaks of 38.0 °C (100.4 °F) at Lingwood, Norfolk, in June, and 35.1 °C (95.2 °F) at Kew Gardens in May. Following formal declarations by the Environment Agency and Natural Resources Wales, all of Wales and half of England were officially placed in a state of drought. The meteorological background was framed by July being provisionally confirmed as the driest month on record for England and Wales, with England receiving just 7% of its average monthly rainfall, and southern regions recording 1%.

Water supply pressure mounted significantly, leaving over 24 million residents across England and Wales subject to Temporary Use Bans (hosepipe bans) as regional reservoir levels and river flows dropped to critical levels. On 3 August, Essex & Suffolk Water introduced a hosepipe ban for 1.8 million customers across its supply regions in Essex and Suffolk, marking the company's first temporary use restriction since June 1997 following four consecutive heatwaves and high peak demand. Similar restrictions were active or announced across other regions by major suppliers, including Thames Water in Greater London and the Thames Valley, Southern Water and South East Water across Kent, Sussex, and Hampshire, Welsh Water (Dŵr Cymru) in Pembrokeshire, Yorkshire Water across Yorkshire, and South West Water across Cornwall and Devon.

Beyond water supply restrictions, extreme heat combined with severe soil moisture deficit (SMD) caused clay-based railway embankments to shrink, disturbing track geometry and creating rail buckling risks across the national network. Network Rail implemented emergency speed restrictions and altered timetables effective from 3 August across southern and eastern corridors, affecting passenger operators including Greater Anglia, c2c, Great Northern, the Elizabeth line, and South Western Railway. High ambient temperatures and tinder-dry vegetation also maintained "exceptionally severe" wildfire hazards, forcing fire and rescue services to keep personnel deployed on prolonged, multi-day damping-down operations at recent burn sites—such as Dunwich Heath in Suffolk—to suppress subterranean peat fires and prevent re-ignition.

The Met Office predicted on 4 August that heavy thunderstorms would hit Angus, Perth and Kinross, Grampian, Aberdeen, Aberdeenshire, Moray, Highland and Northern Ireland the following day. Rain was also predicted for surrey Guildford, Woking and Reigate.

== Mid August heatwave ==
2026 United Kingdom heatwaves
Meteorological history
- Duration: 9–15 August 2026
- Heat event
- Max temp: 38.2 °C (100.8 °F), recorded at Hartpury College, Gloucestershire on 13 August

Overall effects
- Areas affected: United Kingdom

On 7 August, the Met Office and the UK Health Security Agency (UKHSA) issued widespread heat-health alerts across England as high pressure was forecast to establish a southerly flow of hot air from continental Europe. Following an exceptionally dry start to August, forecasters projected heatwave conditions to develop across large parts of England and Wales during the weekend and lasting through the week starting 10 August.

A north–south weather split was expected to persist, with Scotland and Northern Ireland seeing rain and cooler conditions, while southern regions were projected to experience rising temperatures. The Met Office forecast temperatures climbing into the low 30s °C (around 90°F) by mid-week, with peak values potentially reaching 36 °C (96.8 °F) in parts of East Anglia and south-east England by Thursday 13 August. On 13 August, temperatures peaked at 38.2 °C (100.8 °F) in Hartpury College, Gloucestershire, which is the joint 4th hottest temperature ever recorded in the UK.

Water companies and regional authorities warned that the expected period of high heat would exacerbate ongoing drought conditions across southern England, maintaining temporary hosepipe bans and wildfire advisories across multiple regions.

=== Impacts ===
High-pressure systems re-established across southern and central Britain over the weekend of 8–9 August 2026, marking the start of a renewed heatwave spell. On 9 August, daytime maximum temperatures reached 30.6 °C (87.1 °F) at Frittenden, Kent, with regional highs peaking between 31 °C (88°F) and 32 °C (90°F) across London and the South East. The Met Office noted that by 9 August, the UK had recorded 33 days in 2026 where temperatures surpassed 30 °C (86 °F) somewhere in the country—one day short of the single-year national record of 34 days set in 1995. The conditions demonstrated a stark national contrast, as persistent cloud and heavy precipitation affected north-west Scotland, where over 100 mm (3.9 in) of rainfall fell across a 48-hour period—equivalent to half of the region's average monthly precipitation. The Met Office projected that following a slight dip on Monday 10 August, the heatwave would intensify mid-week, with temperatures expected to reach 34 °C (93 °F) in central and southern regions on 12 August, and up to 36 °C (97 °F) in East Anglia and the South East on 13 August.

The mid-August heatwave severely impacted health services, water supply infrastructure, public safety, and ecosystems across England and Wales. The UK Health Security Agency (UKHSA) and Met Office issued Amber Heat-Health Alerts across all nine English regions on 10 August, alongside an Amber Extreme Heat warning covering Eastern, Southern, and Central England. The NHS reported a 45% increase in heatstroke-related emergency department admissions and calls to 111 across the South East and London. Water safety authorities issued widespread drowning warnings as 11 people, including four teenagers, died in open-water incidents across England during the first week of August.

Network Rail implemented speed restrictions of 20 mph (32 km/h) to 60 mph (97 km/h) across major lines—including the East Coast Main Line and Great Western Main Line—to reduce the risk of track buckling as rail temperatures exceeded 50 °C (122 °F). Overhead line sagging and sag-related equipment failures caused significant delays and cancellations at London King's Cross, London Euston, and across the South Western Railway network.

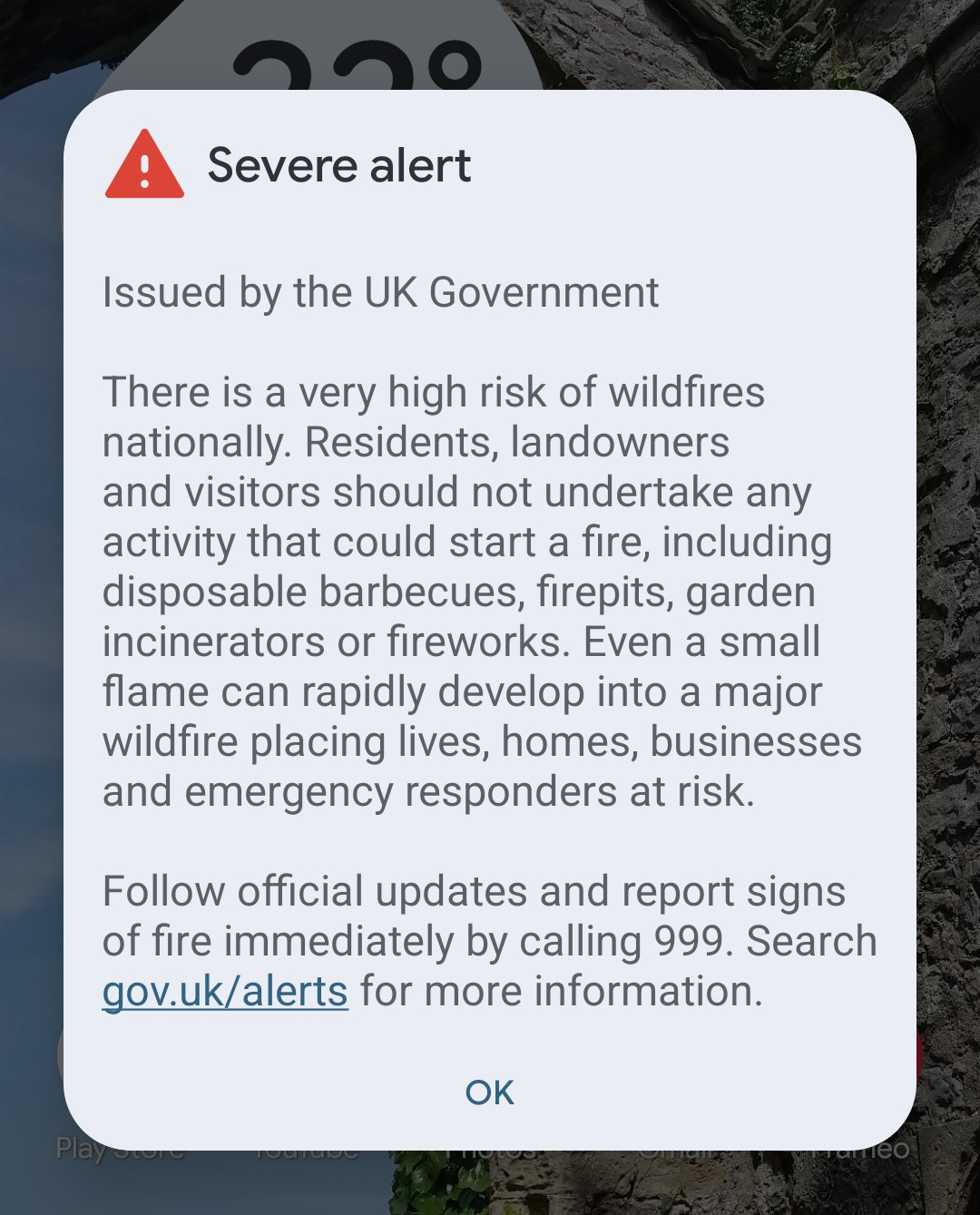
On 14 August an alert was sent to phones in England and Wales about the risk of wildfires.

The National Fire Chiefs Council (NFCC) stated that UK fire and rescue services attended over 220 individual wildfire incidents in the first 12 days of August alone. Major blazes included the 2026 Dunwich Heath wildfire in Suffolk, where subterranean peat fires burned at temperatures exceeding 600 °C (1000°F), and a major heathland fire in the New Forest, Hampshire on 9 August. The prolonged period of high heat and low precipitation intensified severe drought conditions, leading South West Water and Thames Water to enforce mandatory hosepipe and temporary use bans affecting over 15 million households across Southern England. On 14 August a temporary ban on disposable barbecues was instigated, and an emergency alert was sent to phones in England and Wales to inform people of the threat of wildfires.

On 13 August, temperatures reached a high of 38.2 °C (100.8 °F) at Hartpury College in Gloucestershire, making it the joint fourth hottest day recorded in the UK. Kew Gardens, London recorded 38.1 °C (100.6 °F), with 40 individual locations across central and southern England exceeding 36.0 °C (96.8 °F). The event marked 2026 as having the highest number of days on record reaching or exceeding 36.0 °C (96.8 °F) (four days) and 37.0 °C (98.6 °F) (three days) in the UK.

== Drought ==
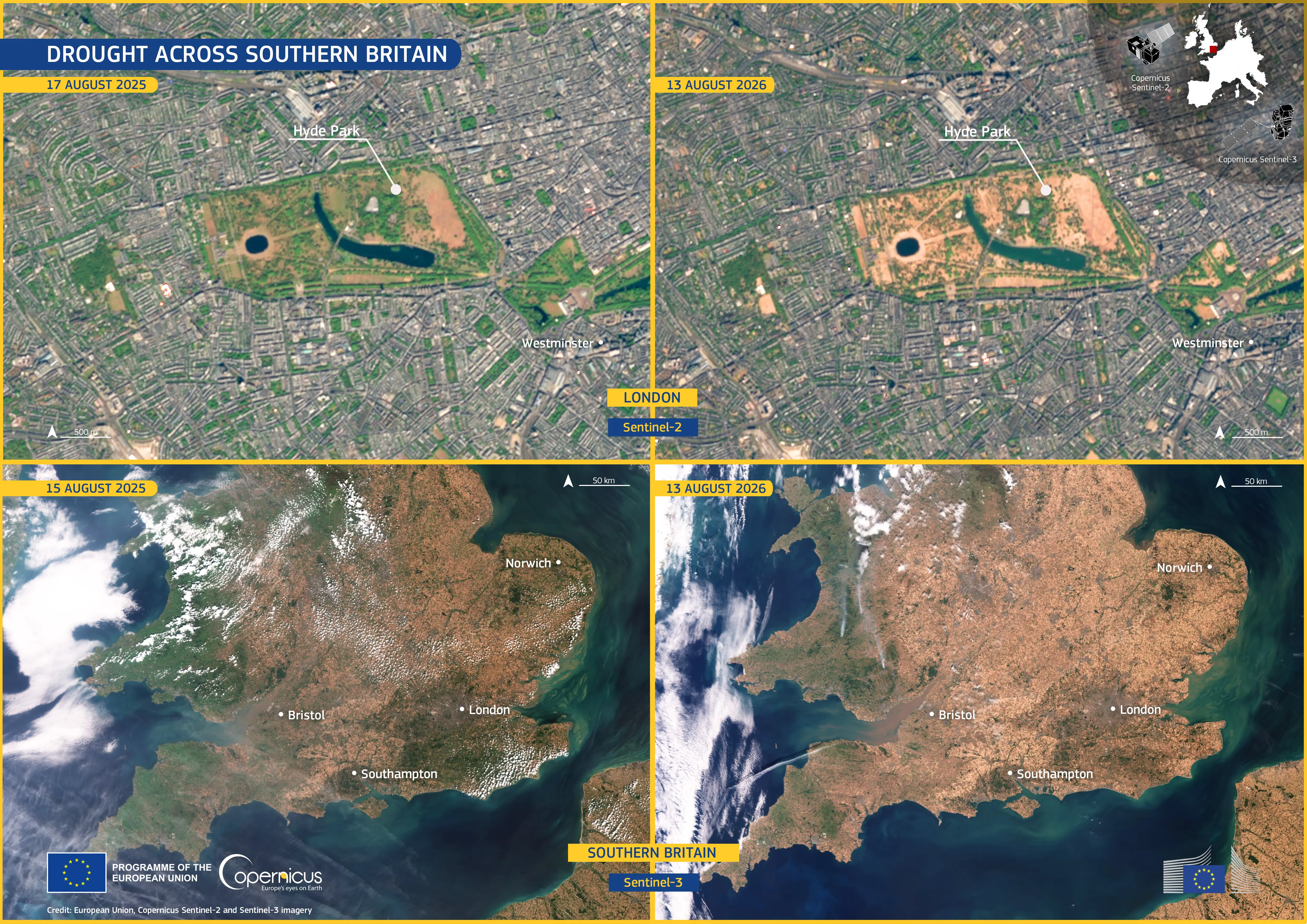
Satellite imagery taken by Sentinel-2 and Sentinel-3 from 13 August comparing conditions in Hyde Park and southern Britain to August 2025, showing extensive grass browning from prolonged dry conditions.

In June 2026, the Environment Agency (EA) convened its National Drought Group to discuss the dry spring and recent heatwave. It assessed that the dry weather put England at risk of a ‘flash drought’ similar to the 2022 drought in the United Kingdom, with reducing river flows, low rainfall and increased water use during hot weather.

On 23 July, Natural Resources Wales (NRW) declared a drought for the northern half of Wales after the country had seen around 5% of its average rainfall for the month, with affected areas including Anglesey, Clwyd, Dee, Gwynedd and Upper Severn. The drought was extended to cover the whole country a week later on 30 July amid deteriorating conditions, with Wales on track for its driest July on record as rivers ran "exceptionally low" after seeing only 8% of the average rainfall for the month.

On 29 July, the Environment Agency (EA) declared a drought for half of England, covering seven areas: Devon & Cornwall; East Anglia; Hampshire & the Isle of Wight; Hertfordshire and London; the Thames Valley; Wessex, which covers covering Dorset, Somerset, south Gloucestershire and Wiltshire; and the West Midlands. A further seven areas were in prolonged dry weather, which is the stage before drought: Cumbria & Lancashire; the East Midlands; Greater Manchester, Merseyside & Cheshire; Kent & East Sussex; Lincolnshire & Northamptonshire; and the rest of Solent & the South Downs. The announcement came after England saw just 7% of its average monthly rainfall during July, with some areas of the country seeing no rain for over 50 days. It was reported that 78% of England's rivers were classified below normal, with a sixth of them classed as exceptionally low as some rivers tracked their lowest river flows on record for the time of year; reservoir storage had fallen to 75.3%, around 7.4% below the average for the time of year, with almost half classed as below normal levels.

Data from the Environment Agency show that in late July England's reservoirs were at 72% of capacity; three reservoirs were "exceptionally low" – Hanningfield in Essex (65% full), Blagdon in Somerset (56%), and Wimbleball in Somerset (54%) – and a further seven were "notably low".

On 2 August, the National Farmers' Union warned that if the current drought conditions continued there could be a shortage of certain food products, with "very, very poor" yields of wheat and oats as an inability to grow grass forced livestock farmers to use their winter feed rations. An analysis from the Energy and Climate Intelligence Unit on 5 August said the harvests of some crops were set to be the worst since records began in 1984, estimating that cereal and oilseed harvests could be up to 2.5 million metric tons (2,500,000 long tons; 2,800,000 short tons) lower than earlier forecasts, costing farmers £390 million. It came after the Agriculture and Horticulture Development Board estimated yields of oat, spring barley and wheat would be down, with the latter well below the ten-year average at 6.8 metric tons per hectare (2.7 long ton/acre; 3.0 short ton/acre).

In late August, cider producers began warning that smaller farms were abandoning orchards due to impacts on the quantity and quality of the apple harvest. Impacts continued to be felt autumn of 2026, as October Apple Day festivities in Tatton Park, Cheshire were cancelled for the first time in 24 years due to a "significantly reduced harvest" from apple and pear trees.

On 10 August, drought was declared in The East Midlands, Lincolnshire & Northamptonshire, Kent & East Sussex and Solent & the South Downs. As of 17 September 2026, the EA has assessed ten of its operational areas in England were experiencing drought, while other areas are experiencing a period of ‘prolonged dry weather’. Extreme heat has contributed to a decrease in the volume of water stored, with depleted groundwater storage and below average reservoir storage.

== Records broken ==
=== Maximum temperatures ===
Country	Month	Measurement	Date	Place	Previous record	Notes	Ref.
United Kingdom; England	May	35.1 °C (95.2 °F)	25 May	Kew Gardens	32.8 °C (91.0 °F)	The previous record was broken at a total of 23 weather stations across the country. 163 stations broke their own records.	
Wales	May	32.9 °C (91.2 °F)	26 May	Bute Park	30.6 °C (87.1 °F)		
Jersey	May	34.2 °C (93.6 °F)	26 May	St Saviour	28.9 °C (84.0 °F)		
Guernsey	May	31.5 °C (88.7 °F)	26 May	Guernsey Airport	26.8 °C (80.2 °F)		
United Kingdom; England	June	38.0 °C (100.4 °F)	26 June	Lingwood	35.6 °C (96.1 °F)		
Wales	June	35.1 °C (95.2 °F)	26 June	Hawarden	33.7 °C (92.7 °F)		
Northern Ireland	June	30.8 °C (87.4 °F)	25 June	Castlederg	30.8 °C (87.4 °F)	Equalled previous record set in 1976.	
Jersey	June	39.3 °C (102.7 °F)	25 June	St Saviour	37.9 °C (100.2 °F)	Also an all-time record.	
Guernsey	June	36.4 °C (97.5 °F)	25 June	Guernsey Airport	34.3 °C (93.7 °F)	Also an all-time record.	

=== Minimum temperatures ===
Country	Month	Measurement	Date	Place	Previous record	Notes	Ref.
United Kingdom; England	May	21.4 °C (70.5 °F)	27 May	Camborne	18.9 °C (66.0 °F)	The previous record was broken at a total of 14 weather stations across the country. 99 stations broke their own records.	
Wales	May	18.9 °C (66.0 °F)	26 May	Aberdaron	18.6 °C (65.5 °F)		
Northern Ireland	May	15.9 °C (60.6 °F)	28 May	Killowen	15.6 °C (60.1 °F)		
Jersey	May	21.6 °C (70.9 °F)	26 May	St Saviour	19.1 °C (66.4 °F)		
Guernsey	May	22.2 °C (72.0 °F)	26 May	Guernsey Airport	14.8 °C (58.6 °F)		
United Kingdom; England	June	23.2 °C (73.8 °F)	26 June	Hastings	22.7 °C (72.9 °F)		
Wales	June	22.7 °C (72.9 °F)	25 June	Tenby	20.0 °C (68.0 °F)		
Northern Ireland	June	19.1 °C (66.4 °F)	26 June	Murlough	18.2 °C (64.8 °F)	Equalled previous record set in 1976.	

=== Mean maximum temperatures ===
Country	Month	Measurement	Previous record	Reference
England	May	18.7 °C (65.7 °F)	17.0 °C (62.6 °F)	

=== Mean minimum temperatures ===
Country	Month	Measurement	Previous record	Reference
United Kingdom	June	11.3 °C (52.3 °F)	10.8 °C (51.4 °F)	
England	June	12.4 °C (54.3 °F)	11.9 °C (53.4 °F)	
Wales	June	12.0 °C (53.6 °F)	11.5 °C (52.7 °F)	

=== Mean temperatures ===
Country	Month	Measurement	Previous record	Notes	Reference
Jersey	May	16.5 °C (61.7 °F)	15.8 °C (60.4 °F)		
Guernsey	May	15.0 °C (59.0 °F)	14.3 °C (57.7 °F)		
England	Spring	10.41 °C (50.74 °F)	10.23 °C (50.41 °F)		
Wales	Spring	9.73 °C (49.51 °F)	9.69 °C (49.44 °F)		
Jersey	Spring	13.5 °C (56.3 °F)	12.7 °C (54.9 °F)		
Guernsey	Spring	12.3 °C (54.1 °F)	11.4 °C (52.5 °F)		
England	June	17.1 °C (62.8 °F)	15.2 °C (59.4 °F)		
Jersey	June	19.2 °C (66.6 °F)	18.7 °C (65.7 °F)		
Guernsey	June	17.5 °C (63.5 °F)	17.3 °C (63.1 °F)		
Wales	July	17.8 °C (64.0 °F)		Equalled previous record reached in 1983 and 2006.	
Jersey	July	21.3 °C (70.3 °F)	21.1 °C (70.0 °F)	Also an all-time record.	
Guernsey	July	19.5 °C (67.1 °F)	19.4 °C (66.9 °F)		

=== Mean daily temperatures ===
Country	Measurement	Date	Previous record	Reference
England	26.5 °C (79.7 °F)	26 June	23.2 °C (73.8 °F)	

== See also ==
- Climate change in the United Kingdom
- 2022 United Kingdom heatwaves
- 2026 European heatwaves
- 2026 United Kingdom wildfires
- 2026 European drought
- United Kingdom weather records
- List of weather records
- Temperature anomaly
- Weather of 2026
