= 2026 New Forest wildfire =

Wildfire in Hampshire, England

- Part of 2026 United Kingdom wildfires
- Date: 9 August – 23 August 2026; ~17:24 BST –
- Location: near Ringwood, Hampshire, New Forest National Park
- Coordinates: 50.871°N 1.652°W

Statistics
- Total area: 1.6 sq km (0.62 sq mi)

Ignition
- Cause: Van fire which spread to heathland

Map
- Location within Hampshire

On 9 August 2026, a van fire broke out on the A31 dual-carriageway near Ringwood, Hampshire, in the New Forest National Park. The van fire spread from the vehicle onto the central reservation before progressing on nearby heathland. The fire continued to spread for over a week, and has involved the destruction of more than 1.6 square kilometres (0.62 sq mi) of the New Forest's heathland, as well as a prolonged closure of the A31 for over ten days during the summer holidays, causing widespread travel disruption. The fire was fully contained on 23 August.

== Events ==
At approximately 17:20 BST (British Summer Time) on Sunday 9 August 2026, a van travelling on the A31 near Bratley Wood caught fire. Due to the unseasonably long, dry, and hot summer, in which Hampshire had not seen any rainfall for 59 days, the fire was able to spread from the van to the central reservation and then onto the heathland. Hampshire & Isle of Wight Fire and Rescue received over 160 emergency 999 calls at around 17:24 BST, and responded with 26 fire engines. Due to the remoteness of the area, there was no easily available water supply, so a hose was laid to Hightown Lake, 5 kilometres (3.1 mi) away, where water could be pumped to fight it, approximately 1,300 liters (340 U.S. gal) per minute.

A major incident was subsequently declared by the fire service, and it continued to spread across several hundred hectares of land, with firefighting efforts hampered by a change in wind direction on Tuesday 11 August. According to the fire service, 193 different firefighters have fought the blaze from 93 separate fire stations with support also sent from neighbouring counties and nationally, through the National Resilience programme, for example, two teams from Suffolk Fire & Rescue were also sent to the scene.

== Damage ==
The fire has destroyed an area of protected heathland equivalent to approximately 230 football pitches, or over 400 acres, and has extensively damaged road infrastructure on the A31. The fire has threatened six endangered species including the Dartford warbler, nightjars, and all six species of native reptile found in the UK. The area is expected to take 15 to 20 years to recover.
