= Tropical night =

Night with unusually high temperatures

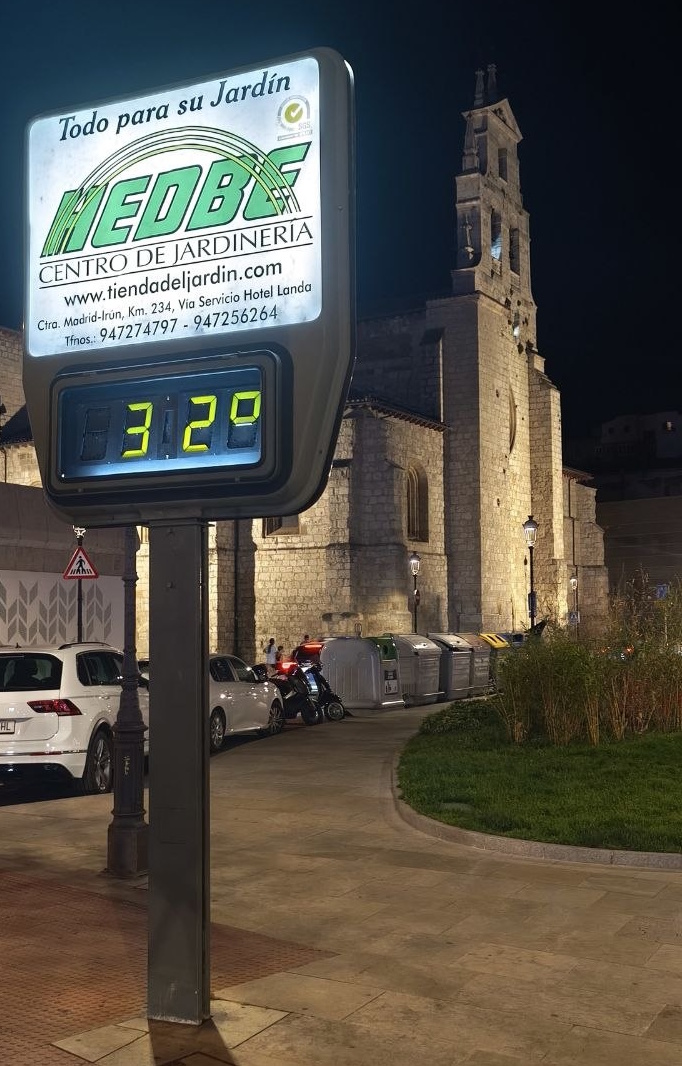
Urban paving intensifies the heat island effect during tropical nights.

"Tropical night" is a term used in many European countries to describe days when the temperature does not fall below 20 °C (68.0 °F) during the nighttime. This definition is in use in countries including Austria, Belgium, Croatia, Denmark, Estonia, Finland, France, Germany, Greece, Hungary, Italy, Ireland, Latvia, Lithuania, the Netherlands, Norway, Poland, Portugal, Romania, Serbia, Slovakia, Slovenia, Spain, Sweden, Switzerland and the United Kingdom.

In the United States, by contrast, the term sultry nights is used when the temperature does not fall below 27 °C (80.6 °F) in the Gulf and Atlantic states.

Tropical nights are common during heat waves and occur mostly over seas, coasts, and lakes. Heat gets stored in the water during periods of sunny and warm weather during the day, which is then emitted during the night and keeps the night temperatures up.

== Croatia ==
In Croatia, this occurrence is usually termed 'warm night' (Croatian: topla noć), but also tropska noć ('tropical night'). A 'very warm night' (vrlo topla noć) occurs when the temperature stays above 25 °C (77.0 °F) overnight. Tropical nights happen regularly at the seaside in summer, and less frequently inland.

In the 1961–1990 period, there was an average of 10–20 tropical nights a month during the summer at the seaside, but less than one per year in most of continental Croatia. However, they have become more frequent in Zagreb since 2000. During 1990–2014, Zagreb recorded an increasing trend of 19.5 additional tropical nights per decade. In August 2018, the Zagreb–Grič Observatory registered 24 tropical nights, beating the previous record from 2003.

== Greece ==
Southern Greece records very high spring, summer, autumn and occasionally winter minimum temperatures mainly due to its geographical proximity to the Eastern Mediterranean, but also due to foehn winds especially in Crete and Rhodes. The World Meteorological Organization station in Kastellorizo registers on average 158 tropical nights per year, while Crete routinely records tropical nights even in January. Downtown Athens records 107 tropical nights per year for the period 1991-2020. In 2018, Lindos registered a record high of 178 tropical nights. On average Lindos records 6.1 days each year with minimum temperatures over 30.0 °C.

On 4 July 1998, Kythira recorded an astonishing minimum temperature of 37.0 °C.

On the night between 25 and 26 of June 2007 the temperature did not drop below 38.0°C in the Palaiochora World Meteorological Organization station.

On the 27th of June 2007 Monemvasia registered a staggering minimum temperature of 35.9 °C which is the highest minimum temperature ever recorded in mainland Greece. Monemvasia records 133 tropical nights per year which is unique for a location in mainland Europe.

On the night of the 11th of January 2021 the World Meteorological Organization station in Falasarna recorded a stunning temperature of 28.3 °C due to strong foehn winds while the minimum temperature for that day was 22.6 °C marking both the highest January temperature during a night and the highest January minimum temperature ever recorded in Greece.

During July 2024 minimum temperatures remained over 30 °C (86 °F) for 12 consecutive days in metropolitan Athens, breaking all known records for any area in the country.

== Ireland ==
Tropical nights occur rarely and usually only during heatwaves.

In Ireland, two tropical nights were observed at the Valentia Observatory in County Kerry during a heatwave in July 2021. This was the first time ever that two tropical nights were recorded in a row in Ireland.

In September 2023, the first autumn tropical night was recorded when a minimum of 22.3 °C (72.1 °F) was recorded at Valentia Observatory.

In June 2026, tropical nights were observed in Dublin's Phoenix Park, counties Carlow and also Kilkenny.

== Spain ==
In Spain, it is termed noche tropical (tropical night). It occurs mostly on the Canary Islands, Mediterranean coast, Ibiza and Menorca. It is also common on inland parts of Andalusia. In central parts they are less prevalent, but yet expected to occur on some summer nights, especially during heat waves. On interior of north they are very rare, except in the Ebro valley.

When the temperature does not fall below 25 °C (77 °F) is noche tórrida or noche ecuatorial (torrid night or ecuatorial night). This term has gained popularity, as nighttime temperatures have been increasingly higher in recent years during the summer. The Canary Islands are more affected by torrid nights than any other part of country. It is common, but not expected to be consistent on the Mediterranean coast and the Balearic Islands of Ibiza and Menorca. In hinterland Spain they can occur during intense heat waves.

Recently, the name noche infernal (hellish night) was introduced and is when the temperature does not fall below 30 °C (86 °F), something that for now is not very common, but has occurred, especially in the Canary Islands. On mainland Spain, some cities recorded hellish nights, such as the city of Málaga, Almería and even some inland cities such as Lora de Estepa.

The Canary Islands record the highest number of tropical nights per year, with the island of El Hierro having 154 tropical nights per year and Santa Cruz de Tenerife having 130. In mainland Spain, the cities Cartagena, Cádiz, Almería, Valencia, San Javier, Málaga and Alicante have the highest number with 101, 92, 89, 79, 75, 72 and 71 respectively. In 2023, El Hierro registered a record 208 tropical nights, the highest ever recorded in the country.

Although some cities on the Mediterranean coast in the east and southeast of Spain have fewer tropical nights, on average, compared to some cities in the south of the country, it is important to mention that the Mediterranean coast in the east and southeast has high levels of air humidity during the summer, making high dew point levels. These high levels of air humidity can make tropical nights much more uncomfortable compared to southern cities that have low levels of air humidity, as high humidity makes it difficult or even impossible for sweat to evaporate, causing the heat index increases. In addition to the increase in the heat index, there is also a feeling of stuffy and sticky weather, which can contribute to a general feeling of discomfort, making the weather more oppressive.

The highest minimum temperature ever recorded in Spain was 37.4 °C (99.3 °F) in Guia de Isora on 12 August 2023. In peninsular Spain it was 33.2 °C (91.8 °F) in Almeria on 31 July 2001, which is also the highest ever recorded on iberian Peninsula. On 3 August 1980, Lorca recorded a minimum temperature of 31 °C (88 °F), the highest ever recorded in a non-coastal city in the country.

== United Kingdom ==
The Met Office began tracking 'tropical nights' in 2018 due to their increasing frequency under climate breakdown. This criterion used to be infrequently met, with the 30 years between 1961 and 1990 seeing 44 tropical nights, most of them associated with the hot summers of 1976 and 1983. From 1991 to 11 August 2020, 84 such nights were recorded, with 21 of them occurring since 2008. Five nights that stayed above 20 °C were recorded in 2018, and four in 2019. By 11 August 2020, four tropical nights had been recorded for that year, one in June and three in August.

During the July 2022 heatwave, a tropical night recorded overnight from 18–19 July was reported to have been the warmest on record, where temperatures in many parts of the country did not fall below 25 °C. The hottest night on record was set in the early hours of 19 July 2022 at Shirburn Model Farm, Oxfordshire, not falling below 26.8 °C, smashing the previous record of 23.9 °C in the country. This was confirmed on 23 August 2022.

During the May 2026 heatwave, an overnight temperature of 21.4 °C (70.5 °F) was recorded in Camborne in Cornwall between 25 and 26 May, making it the warmest May night on record.

== See also ==
- Dog days
- Heat dome
- Heat wave
- Urban heat island
