= Disposable grill =

Barbecue grill type

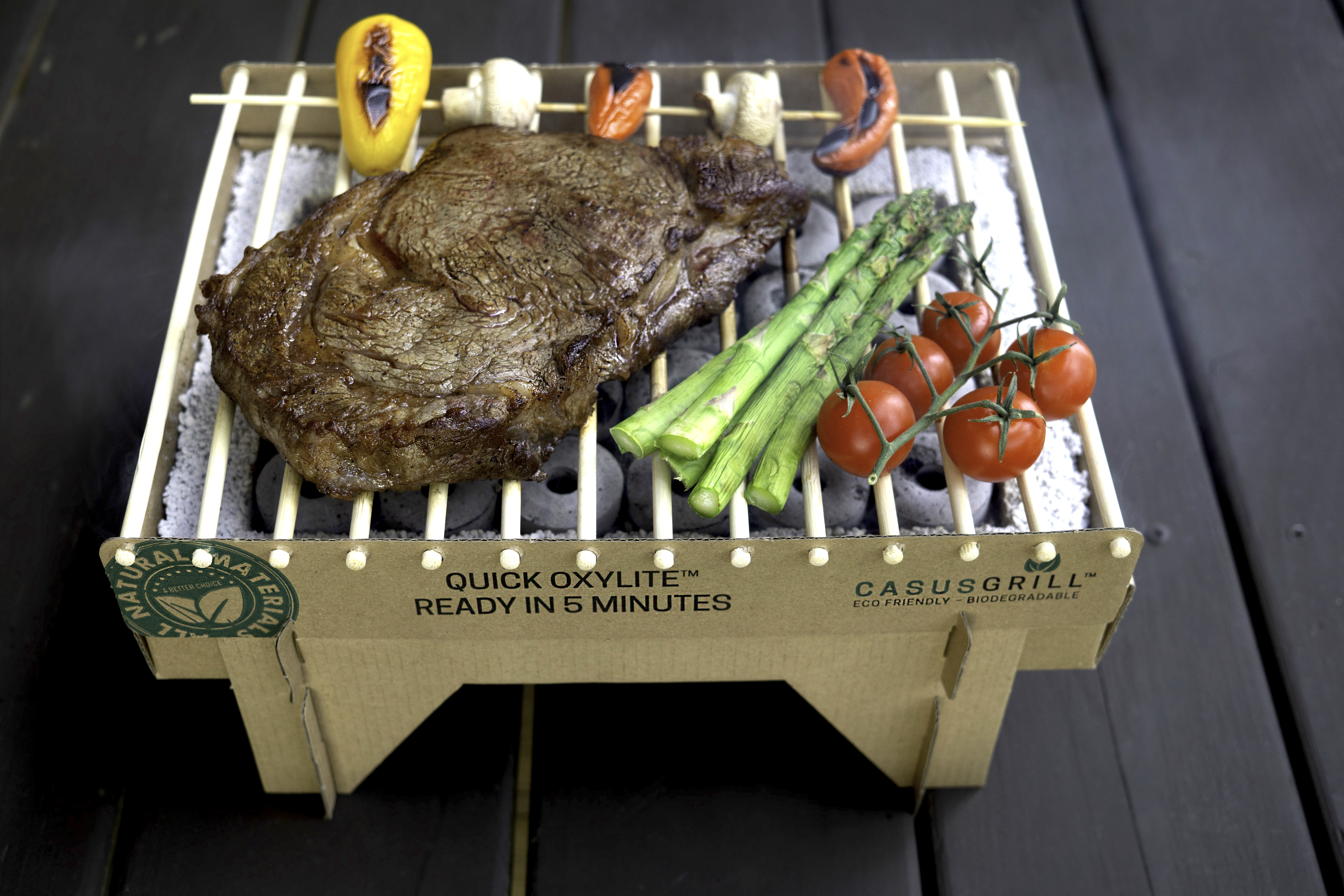
Cooking on a biodegradable disposable grill

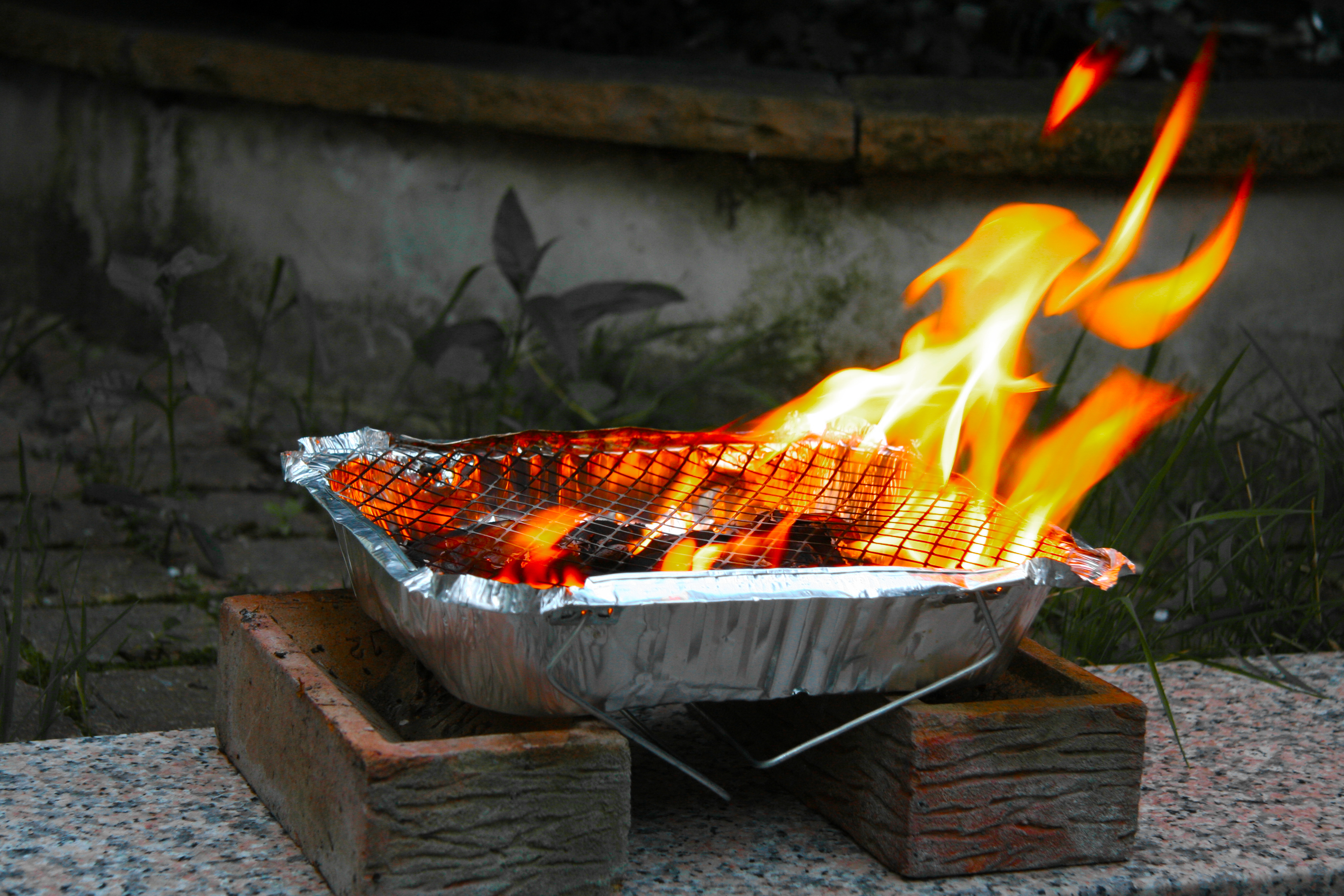
A disposable barbecue

A disposable grill is a specific barbecue grill type which is used in a single application, with the grill being recycled or disposed of after use.

Disposable grills are made from a lightweight aluminium material and use charcoal for the heat source. The grill is self-contained, meaning that all elements needed for cooking the food are included: foil pan, grill top, stand (optional), charcoal, starter sheet, and ignition fluid.

== History and popularity ==
Confusion may arise between disposable grills and portable grills. Portable barbecue grills are small and lightweight, and are often used for camping. These have been in existence for several decades, but have certain limitations, namely cleaning, transport and safety.

The disposable BBQ grill is a newer phenomenon, first appearing in Europe in the late 1990s.

== Use ==
Disposable grills are suitable for a variety of uses, such as camping, outdoor recreation, tailgating, apartment dwellers, entertaining or beach parties.

To start the grill, the user removes the outer packaging and lights the corner of the starter sheet. The sheet will ignite the charcoal and continue to burn for about 15 minutes, heating the charcoal. No lighter fluid is required. When the coals reach an even and optimal temperature, any food types which are commonly grilled can be placed on the grill top and cooked, including steaks, seafood, chicken, kebabs, vegetables, burgers and sausages.

The charcoal will remain hot enough to continue cooking for up to 1.5 hours after ignition. The remaining charcoal is then extinguished with water, sand, or dirt and the entire grill can be recycled or disposed.

== Charcoal types ==
Disposable grills use either charcoal briquettes or all-natural lump charcoal as their fuel source. The charcoal, when burned, will transform into embers radiating the heat necessary to cook food.

There is contention among grilling enthusiasts as to what type of charcoal is best for grilling. Users of charcoal briquets emphasize the uniformity in size, burn rate, and heat creation exemplified by briquets. Users of all-natural lump charcoal emphasize the subtle smoky aromas, high heat production, and lack of chemicals, binders and fillers often present in briquets.

== Environmental impact ==
Disposable grills have been criticized for their single-use nature and potential to cause wildfires. Some cities have banned using them at public beaches and parks over carbon footprint and littering concerns.

In the UK in August 2026, following the numerous wildfires, Labour Party MP for High Peak Jon Pearce wrote to the country's largest retailers, asking them to stop selling disposable barbecues for the rest of the summer and pledged to continue campaigning for a full ban in public areas.
