= 2026 Dunwich Heath wildfire =

2026 heathland fire in Suffolk, England

- Part of 2026 United Kingdom wildfires
- Date: 29 July – 10 August 2026; ~17:30 BST
- Location: Dunwich Heath, Leiston, Suffolk, England
- Coordinates: 52.261°N 1.619°E

Statistics
- Burned area: Approx. 150 hectares (370 acres)

Impacts
- Injuries: 0
- Structures destroyed: None confirmed destroyed

Ignition
- Cause: Under investigation (exacerbated by heatwave and drought)

The 2026 Dunwich Heath wildfire was a heathland fire on Dunwich Heath near Leiston, on the Suffolk coast in the East of England. The fire began on 29 July 2026 amidst a regional heatwave and drought conditions across England, prompting Suffolk Fire and Rescue Service to declare a major incident. Driven by dry vegetation and shifting wind conditions, the blaze expanded to cover an estimated 150 hectares (370 acres) of lowland heath by the evening of 30 July. Over 120 firefighters, 18 fire engines, and mutual aid support—including six appliances from the London Fire Brigade—have been deployed to tackle the fast-moving blaze. Plumes of smoke were visible for miles along the coast, with smoke odours reported across coastal Suffolk, including in Lowestoft approximately 20 miles (32 km) to the north.

== Background ==
During late July 2026, the United Kingdom experienced severe summer weather conditions. On 29 July, the Environment Agency officially declared half of England to be in drought status following extended periods of record-low rainfall and high temperatures. Concurrently, the UK Health Security Agency (UKHSA) issued an amber heat-health alert across multiple regions, including the East of England, as daily temperatures exceeded 30 °C (86 °F).

Dunwich Heath, an area of rare lowland heathland managed by the National Trust, consists primarily of heather and gorse vegetation, which becomes highly flammable under prolonged hot and dry conditions.

== Timeline ==
=== 29 July ===
Reports of a fire on Dunwich Heath were first received by emergency services shortly after 17:30 BST on 29 July 2026. Initial crews from Leiston fire station attended the scene and observed a rapidly growing, wind-driven forestry and heathland fire spreading south-west toward St James' Church off Westleton Road.

By 22:30 BST, Suffolk Fire and Rescue Service formally upgraded the response and declared a major incident due to the fire's operational complexity and rapid expansion. Fourteen fire appliances and roughly 90 emergency personnel were mobilized from fire stations across Suffolk, including units from Beccles, Felixstowe, Halesworth, Ipswich, Lowestoft, Saxmundham, Stowmarket, and Woodbridge.

=== 30 July ===
Firefighters continued operations throughout the night into 30 July, with relief crews arriving at 00:15 BST. The incident ground was divided into operational sectors to establish defensive containment lines. Specialized equipment—including Unimog off-road vehicles, 4x4 quad bikes, and thermal imaging drone support—was deployed to monitor fire behavior and navigate difficult coastal terrain.

Throughout 30 July, changing wind conditions and extreme dry heat caused the fire to expand rapidly, growing from an initial footprint of 10 hectares (25 acres) to an estimated 150 hectares (370 acres / 210 soccer pitches). The fire also spread onto neighbouring RSPB Minsmere land, causing the nature reserve to close to visitors.

Response operations were scaled up significantly, with over 120 firefighters and 18 fire engines on scene, supported by water-dropping helicopters and six appliances deployed as mutual aid from the London Fire Brigade.

Despite defensive lines protecting nearby homes and holiday parks, chief fire officers confirmed that the fire remained **not yet under control** due to unpredictable, shifting wind direction, with emergency operations expected to continue for at least a further 36 to 48 hours.

=== 31 July ===
By the morning of 31 July, fire officials reported that while the incident remained active, the fire had begun to **stabilise** following overnight firefighting efforts. Overnight relief crews maintained watching briefs across three operational sectors to manage reigniting hotspots and small spot fires.

Between 12 and 15 fire engines, alongside aerial water-dropping helicopters releasing 1,000-litre sea water payloads, continued operations on the ground. Mutual aid support expanded nationwide, with personnel and specialist appliances deployed from the London Fire Brigade, Essex, Norfolk, Surrey, East Sussex, Northamptonshire, and West Yorkshire Fire and Rescue Services.

By mid-morning, power had been restored to 111 of the 116 properties affected by electrical isolation measures. Fire commanders announced that controlled arrangements were being developed to allow evacuated residents temporary access to collect personal belongings. Emergency services indicated that on-site monitoring and dampening down would remain active throughout the weekend.

=== Into August ===
Over the weekend of 1–2 August, operations shifted from active defensive containment to damping down subterranean peat and root-layer hot spots across the 150-hectare (370-acre) burn perimeter. Thermal imaging camera drones operated by Suffolk Fire and Rescue Service continued to identify underground smouldering across both National Trust land and the adjacent RSPB Minsmere reserve.

On 3 August, Suffolk Fire and Rescue Service formally stood down the major incident declaration, reducing on-site presence to four fire engines and specialist off-road appliances carrying out regular watching briefs. UK Power Networks confirmed that electrical supply had been fully restored to all isolated properties in the IP17 area, while road closures along Minsmere Road were lifted.

By 5 August, emergency crews concluded active damping operations and handed control of the site back to the National Trust and RSPB. Conservation teams subsequently began ecological damage assessments, noting that while surface heather and gorse had suffered extensive burning, critical nesting habitats for nightjars and Dartford warblers were partially protected by defensive fire breaks established during the early stages of the response.

6 August to the 10 August, the fire is still smouldering underground.

At 10:00 BST on Monday, 10 August, Chief Fire Officer Jon Lacey officially stood down the Major Incident designation following updated risk assessments.

On 11 August, SFRS drone teams conducted perimeter thermal-imaging searches, identifying and dampening down isolated underground hotspots that posed reignition risks under hot wind conditions.

Natural England and local authorities confirmed that public access restrictions across Dunwich Heath, Open Access Land, and the King Charles III England Coast Path remain strictly in force through at least 22 August 2026 due to ground instability and subterranean heat.

== Impact and response ==
=== Evacuations and local support ===
Defensive firefighting operations prioritised the protection of surrounding residential structures and commercial sites. Precautionary evacuations were carried out overnight into 30 July for residents and visitors at Coastguard Cottages, Mount Pleasant Farm, and Cliff House Holiday Park.

As the wildfire expanded on 30 July, authorities fully evacuated Cliff House Holiday Park, displacing occupants of approximately 200 holiday caravans and lodges. In total, hundreds of residents and summer holidaymakers were evacuated or self-evacuated from the immediate area. An emergency rest centre was opened at Westleton Village Hall from 08:00 BST on 30 July to provide shelter, updates, and support for displaced individuals.

No injuries or casualties were reported.

=== Infrastructure and public safety ===
Because the fire burned within approximately 4 miles (6.4 km) of Sizewell B nuclear power station (and the construction site for Sizewell C nuclear power station), operations at the nuclear facilities were closely monitored. Operators and emergency services confirmed there was no direct threat to either power station.

As a safety precaution due to the fire's proximity to electrical equipment, UK Power Networks (UKPN) intentionally isolated power lines in the IP17 postcode area, causing a power cut affecting 116 customers around Dunwich and Saxmundham.

To assist emergency vehicle movement and ensure public safety, police established multiple road closures, including a full closure at the junction of Minsmere Road and Westleton Road, along with partial closures on Dunwich Road, Walk Barn Farm Lane, Mill Road, and Hard Piece Lane. The adjacent RSPB Minsmere nature reserve was closed to visitors as a precaution.

The UK Health Security Agency (UKHSA) issued formal health advice instructing residents downwind of the heavy smoke plume to remain indoors with windows and doors securely closed, while Suffolk Fire and Rescue Service requested visitors to avoid the coastal corridor entirely.

== See also ==
- 2026 United Kingdom wildfires
- Dunwich Heath
- RSPB Minsmere
