= Loughermore =

Mountain in Northern Ireland

Coordinates: 54.985307°N 7.080753°W

Loughermore (Luachair Mhór)

Highest point
- Elevation: 396 m (1,299 ft)
- Prominence: 270 m (890 ft)
- Listing: Marilyn

Geography
- Location: County Londonderry, Northern Ireland
- Parent range: Sperrin Mountains
- OSI/OSNI grid: C589157
- Topo map: OSNI Discoverer Series 7 Londonderry (1:50000)

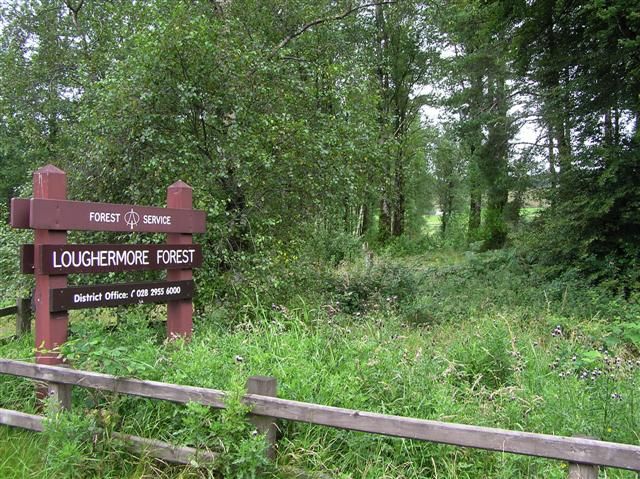
Loughermore Forest entrance

Loughermore (from Irish Luachair Mhór 'big rushy area') is a mountain in County Londonderry, Northern Ireland. It is the 847th highest mountain in Ireland and lies in a large uplands area known as the Loughermore Hills, which is bounded to the west and south by the Rivers Faughan and Foreglen and to the east, by the River Roe.

There is also Loughermore forest. It is called Fairview by most of the local community.
