= Dunwich Heath =

Heathland near Dunwich, Suffolk, England

Coordinates: 52.257°N 1.621°E

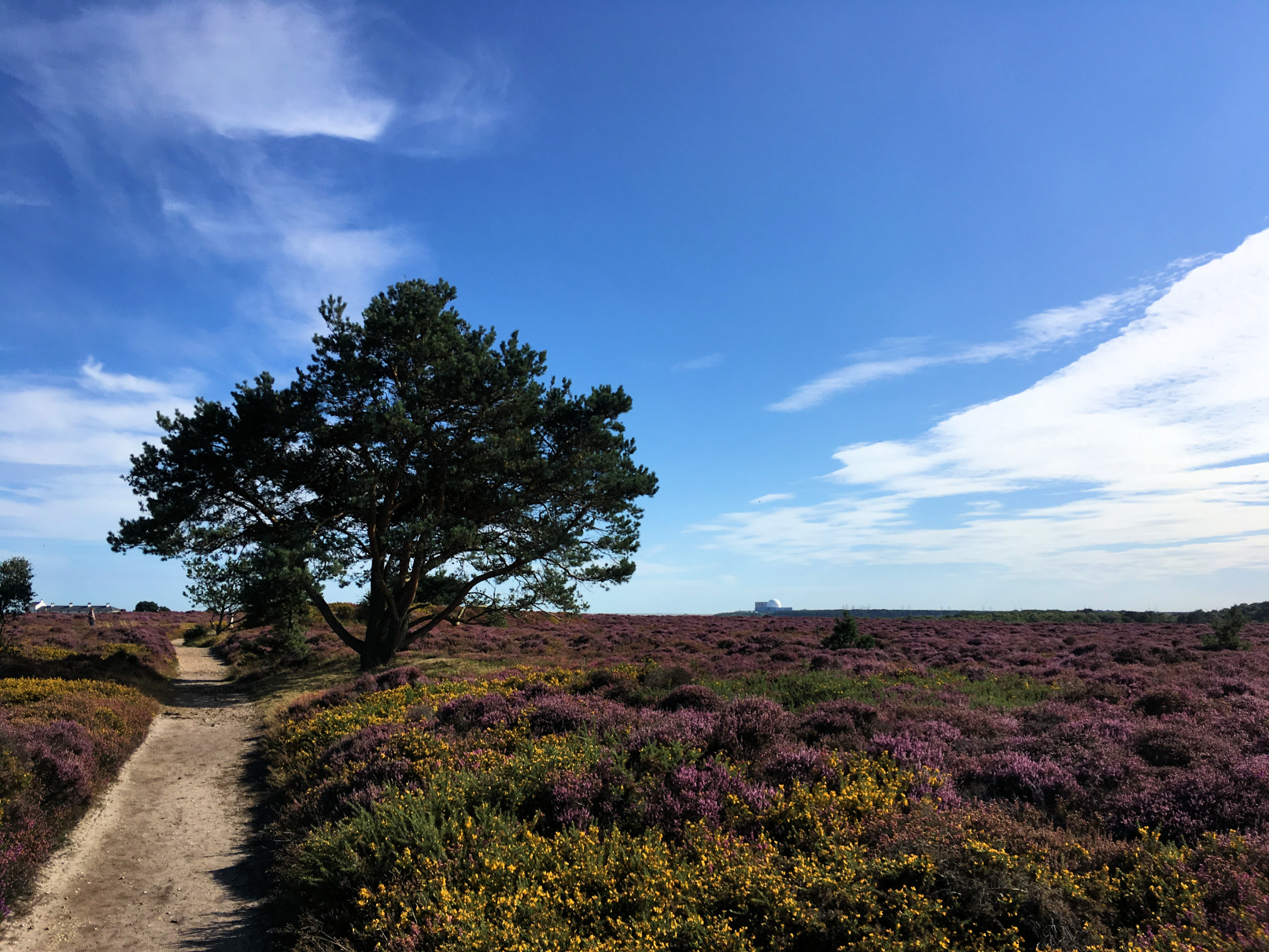
Dunwich Heath with flowering heather and gorse. On the horizon is Sizewell B nuclear power station.

Dunwich Heath is an area of coastal lowland heath just south of the village of Dunwich, in the Suffolk Coast and Heaths AONB, England. It is adjacent to the RSPB reserve at Minsmere. It lies within the area of the Minsmere-Walberswick Heaths and Marshes Site of Special Scientific Interest, Special Area of Conservation and Special Protection Area.

It has been owned by the National Trust since 1968, when it was bought with the help of a donation from the Heinz company as part of Enterprise Neptune.

Dunwich Heath is a rare survival of coastal lowland heath; the Suffolk Sandlings used to form a lot of the Suffolk coast, but have mostly been developed for agriculture or built upon. The heath is mostly covered with heather, both Common Heather and Bell Heather, and European and Western Gorse but there is also some woodland and grassland included in the reserve. The heather and gorse flower from June until September; the heather is purple and pink while the gorse is yellow.

A variety of birds, animals and reptiles live on the heath; red deer, muntjacs, Dartford warblers, European stonechats, and European nightjars, as well as adders, slowworms, grass snakes and common lizards. It supports many unusual invertebrates as well, such as ant lions, digger wasps, mining bees, as well as the true lover's knot moth, and the emperor moth.

== Dunwich Heath Cliff ==
Dunwich Heath Cliff is designated a regionally important geological site. The cliffs are formed of Norwich Crag Formation. The layers of large flint cobbles are known locally as the "Westleton Beds".

== 2026 wildfire ==
On 29 July 2026, a large heathland fire broke out at Dunwich Heath, shortly after 17:30 BST. Driven by strong winds, dry conditions, and a regional heatwave, the fire spread rapidly across coastal heathland covering an area equivalent to roughly 200 football pitches. At 22:30 BST on 29 July, Suffolk Fire and Rescue Service declared a major incident. As of 30 July, approximately 90 firefighters from 14 stations remain on scene tackling the blaze with specialist Unimog vehicles, 4x4 quad bikes, and thermal imaging drones. Defensive lines have been established to protect surrounding properties—including Coastguard Cottages, Mount Pleasant Farm, and Cliff House Holiday Park—with precautionary evacuations carried out for local residents and holidaymakers.

Authorities and operators at the nearby Sizewell B nuclear power station (situated approximately 3 miles or 5 km away) confirmed operations remain unaffected and there is no direct risk to the power station.
