= Grade II* listed buildings in Suffolk Coastal =

There are over 20,000 Grade II* listed buildings in England. This page is a list of these buildings in the district of Suffolk Coastal in Suffolk.

== Suffolk Coastal ==
Name	Location	Type	Completed (Note: The date given is the date used by Historic England as significant for the initial building or that of an important part in the structure's description.)	Date designated	Grid ref. (Note: The grid reference is based on the British national grid reference system, sometimes known as OSGB36, used by the Ordnance Survey.) Geo-coordinates	Entry number (Note: The "List Entry Number" is a unique number assigned to each listed building and scheduled monument by Historic England.)	Image
Farnham Hall	Farnham, Suffolk Coastal	Farmhouse	1602	25 October 1951	TM3655059857; 52°11′10″N 1°27′33″E	1230210	Upload Photo
Church of St Peter and St Paul	Aldeburgh, Suffolk Coastal	Church	14th century	27 February 1950	TM4635156851; 52°09′18″N 1°36′00″E	1269731	Church of St Peter and St Paul More images
Martello Tower	Slaughden, Aldeburgh	House	1932	27 February 1950	TM4629554908; 52°08′15″N 1°35′52″E	1269724	Martello Tower More images
Oakenhill Hall	Badingham	House	1937	25 October 1951	TM3077766437; 52°14′52″N 1°22′45″E	1377163	Upload Photo
Bawdsey Manor	Bawdsey	Country House	c. 1895	28 March 1984	TM3351137806; 51°59′23″N 1°23′59″E	1284199	Bawdsey Manor More images
Church of St Mary	Bawdsey	Church	14th century	16 March 1966	TM3466240116; 52°00′35″N 1°25′05″E	1377190	Church of St Mary More images
Transmitter Block, Bawdsey Manor	Bawdsey	Radar Station	1937	9 July 1997	TM3412038280; 51°59′37″N 1°24′32″E	1245307	Upload Photo
Church of St Mary	Benhall	Parish Church	15th century	7 December 1966	TM3720961861; 52°12′14″N 1°28′12″E	1030902	Church of St Mary More images
Church of St Peter	Blaxhall	Parish Church	13th century	25 October 1984	TM3567256945; 52°09′38″N 1°26′39″E	1198204	Church of St Peter More images
White Hart Inn	Blythburgh	Coaching Inn	Early-Mid 16th century	25 October 1951	TM4530875386; 52°19′18″N 1°35′54″E	1377198	White Hart Inn More images
Bramfield Hall	Bramfield	House/School	16th century	25 October 1951	TM3989373670; 52°18′31″N 1°31′04″E	1377230	Upload Photo
Brandeston Hall	Brandeston	House/School	1847	25 October 1951	TM2474660220; 52°11′40″N 1°17′13″E	1198631	Brandeston Hall More images
The Priory	Brandeston	Farmhouse	1586	25 October 1951	TM2384861342; 52°12′17″N 1°16′29″E	1030597	The Priory More images
Bredfield Place	Bredfield	House	16th century	16 March 1966	TM2706753482; 52°07′59″N 1°18′59″E	1183350	Upload Photo
Church of St Andrew	Bredfield	Church	14th century	16 March 1966	TM2685953015; 52°07′44″N 1°18′47″E	1030745	Church of St Andrew More images
High House	Bredfield	House	19th century	16 March 1966	TM2616153185; 52°07′50″N 1°18′11″E	1377213	Upload Photo
Stables NE of Bredfield House	Bredfield	Tack Room	17th century	31 August 1988	TM2662951399; 52°06′52″N 1°18′31″E	1030747	Upload Photo
Church of St John the Baptist	Brightwell	Church	Medieval	16 March 1966	TM2496643529; 52°02′40″N 1°16′45″E	1030456	Church of St John the Baptist More images
Bruisyard Hall	Bruisyard	House	Early 17th century	25 October 1951	TM3340566214; 52°14′40″N 1°25′03″E	1183054	Bruisyard Hall More images
Church of St Mary	Bucklesham	Church	Medieval	16 March 1966	TM2445442057; 52°01′53″N 1°16′15″E	1030457	Church of St Mary More images
Church of St Botolph	Burgh	Church	14th century	16 March 1966	TM2236152277; 52°07′27″N 1°14′49″E	1197947	Church of St Botolph More images
Church of St John the Baptist	Butley	Church	14th century	16 March 1966	TM3739450165; 52°05′56″N 1°27′53″E	1030848	Church of St John the Baptist More images
Abbey House	Campsey Priory, Campsey Ash	House	C20	16 March 1966	TM3183554448; 52°08′23″N 1°23′12″E	1030828	Upload Photo
Church of St John the Baptist	Campsey Ash	Parish Church	14th century	16 March 1966	TM3299255903; 52°09′08″N 1°24′16″E	1030826	Church of St John the Baptist More images
Mill and Mill House	The Priory, Campsey Ash	Mill and Mill House	Late C15/Early 16th century	16 March 1966	TM3178254477; 52°08′24″N 1°23′09″E	1030830	Mill and Mill House More images
Church of St Peter	Chillesford	Parish Church	14th century	16 March 1966	TM3826752275; 52°07′03″N 1°28′44″E	1030855	Church of St Peter More images
Church of St Mary	Clopton	Church	Early 14th century	16 March 1966	TM2211252575; 52°07′37″N 1°14′37″E	1377398	Church of St Mary More images
Church Cottage and South Cottage	Cookley Corner, Cookley	Aisled House	13th century	19 March 1985	TM3495275313; 52°19′32″N 1°26′47″E	1284368	Church Cottage and South Cottage More images
Church of St Peter	Cransford	Parish Church	Medieval	7 December 1966	TM3156964762; 52°13′56″N 1°23′23″E	1183119	Church of St Peter More images
Church of St Peter	Cretingham	Church	c. 1300	16 March 1966	TM2272960530; 52°11′53″N 1°15′28″E	1030322	Church of St Peter More images
Church of St Botolph	Culpho	Church	Medieval	16 March 1966	TM2101549124; 52°05′47″N 1°13′31″E	1030504	Church of St Botolph More images
Church of St Mary	Dallinghoo	Church	Late 12th century - Early 12th century	16 March 1966	TM2660654979; 52°08′48″N 1°18′38″E	1030325	Church of St Mary More images
Darsham House	Darsham	House	1679	25 October 1951	TM4231869656; 52°16′18″N 1°33′01″E	1198761	Upload Photo
Remains of Grey Friars Monastery	Dunwich	Wall	Late 14th century	25 October 1951	TM4777970360; 52°16′32″N 1°37′51″E	1030715	Remains of Grey Friars Monastery More images
Earl Soham Lodge	Earl Soham	House	1789	25 October 1951	TM2321063471; 52°13′27″N 1°16′00″E	1030608	Upload Photo
Street Farmhouse	Earl Soham	Farmhouse	Late C15-Early 16th century	25 October 1951	TM2322362872; 52°13′08″N 1°15′59″E	1030570	Upload Photo
The Rookery	Earl Soham	House	18th century	25 October 1951	TM2313262937; 52°13′10″N 1°15′55″E	1030569	Upload Photo
Church of St Ethelbert	Falkenham	Parish Church	14th century	16 March 1966	TM2933139043; 52°00′09″N 1°20′23″E	1030914	Church of St Ethelbert More images
Church of St Mary	Farnham	Parish Church	12th century	7 December 1966	TM3625259970; 52°11′14″N 1°27′17″E	1230211	Church of St Mary More images
Bartlet Hospital / Martello Tower "R"	Felixstowe	Martello Tower/Hospital	1810-12	8 May 2006	TM3103834734; 51°57′47″N 1°21′42″E	1391640	Bartlet Hospital / Martello Tower "R" More images
Church of St Andrew	Felixstowe	Church	1929-31	10 February 1986	TM3054635044; 51°57′58″N 1°21′17″E	1377388	Church of St Andrew More images
Church of St John the Baptist and St Felix	Felixstowe	Parish Church	1894-9	10 February 1986	TM2996034438; 51°57′39″N 1°20′45″E	1182986	Church of St John the Baptist and St Felix More images
Church of St Peter and St Paul	Felixstowe	Parish Church	14th century	21 June 1949	TM3142135712; 51°58′18″N 1°22′04″E	1377364	Church of St Peter and St Paul More images
Church of St Mary	Walton, Felixstowe	Parish Church	14th century	21 June 1949	TM2958435634; 51°58′18″N 1°20′28″E	1182887	Church of St Mary More images
Walton Hall	Walton, Felixstowe	House	c1740-50	21 June 1949	TM2886835950; 51°58′29″N 1°19′51″E	1182978	Walton Hall More images
Ancient House	Albert Place, Framlingham	Timber Framed House	Late C17/early 18th century	25 October 1951	TM2833563385; 52°13′17″N 1°20′29″E	1030378	Ancient House More images
Fairfield House	Fairfield Road, Framlingham	Timber Framed House	c. 1600	25 October 1951	TM2850863250; 52°13′12″N 1°20′38″E	1030369	Upload Photo
Garden House	Station Road, Framlingham	House	Later than 16th century	25 October 1951	TM2836163248; 52°13′12″N 1°20′30″E	1377411	Upload Photo
Haynings	38, Castle Street, Framlingham	Timber Framed House	18th century	25 October 1951	TM2878363512; 52°13′20″N 1°20′53″E	1198801	Upload Photo
Regency House	7, Church Street, Framlingham	House	Early 19th century	25 October 1951	TM2858063485; 52°13′20″N 1°20′43″E	1030353	Regency House More images
Sir Robert Hitcham's Almshouses	Framlingham	Almshouse	Later than 1654	25 October 1951	TM2825563503; 52°13′21″N 1°20′26″E	1377408	Sir Robert Hitcham's Almshouses More images
The Grove	Kettleburgh Road, Framlingham	Farmhouse	16th century	7 December 1966	TM2834161124; 52°12′04″N 1°20′24″E	1199099	Upload Photo
The Guildhall	Framlingham	Timber Framed House	Late 16th century	25 October 1951	TM2849263456; 52°13′19″N 1°20′38″E	1030333	Upload Photo
Thomas Mills Almshouses	Framlingham	Almshouse	1703-5	25 October 1951	TM2833663313; 52°13′14″N 1°20′29″E	1199250	Upload Photo
Unitarian Chapel	Bridge Street, Framlingham	Presbyterian Chapel	1717	7 December 1966	TM2842363519; 52°13′21″N 1°20′34″E	1377354	Unitarian Chapel More images
Church of St Mary Magdalene	Friston	Parish Church	14th century	7 December 1966	TM4135060488; 52°11′23″N 1°31′47″E	1287864	Church of St Mary Magdalene More images
Friston Post Mill	Friston	Post Mill	Early 19th century	2 August 1983	TM4113260114; 52°11′11″N 1°31′34″E	1215741	Friston Post Mill More images
Church of St Mary	Great Bealings	Church	16th century	16 March 1966	TM2309548864; 52°05′35″N 1°15′19″E	1030752	Church of St Mary More images
Seckford Hall	Great Bealings	Country House/Hotel	c. 1553	16 March 1966	TM2525348366; 52°05′16″N 1°17′11″E	1030755	Seckford Hall More images
Glemham House	Great Glemham	Country House	Possibly 1708	25 October 1951	TM3453861848; 52°12′18″N 1°25′52″E	1230219	Upload Photo
Bast's	Grundisburgh	House	17th century	16 March 1966	TM2247951112; 52°06′49″N 1°14′52″E	1198244	Upload Photo
Glevering Hall	Hacheston	Country House	1786-94	25 October 1951	TM2982257565; 52°10′06″N 1°21′33″E	1283334	Glevering Hall More images
Glevering Hall Orangery	Hacheston	Orangery	Early-Mid 19th century	25 October 1951	TM2987157594; 52°10′07″N 1°21′36″E	1377281	Upload Photo
Wistaria	Hacheston	House	17th century	25 October 1951	TM3085159211; 52°10′58″N 1°22′32″E	1377284	Wistaria More images
Church of St Andrew	Hasketon	Church	Late 18th century	16 March 1966	TM2502850430; 52°06′23″N 1°17′05″E	1030729	Church of St Andrew More images
Church of All Saints	Hemley	Parish Church	14th century	16 March 1966	TM2855242352; 52°01′57″N 1°19′50″E	1030929	Church of All Saints More images
Temple 900 metres South South East of Heveningham Hall	Heveningham	Garden Seat	Late 18th century	24 July 1970	TM3547772644; 52°18′05″N 1°27′08″E	1284243	Upload Photo
Church of All Saints	Hollesley	Church	Early 13th century	16 March 1966	TM3535244328; 52°02′50″N 1°25′51″E	1198383	Church of All Saints More images
Church of St Andrew and St Eustachius	Hoo	Church	13th century	16 March 1966	TM2563159267; 52°11′08″N 1°17′57″E	1198717	Church of St Andrew and St Eustachius More images
High House Farmhouse	Huntingfield	Farmhouse	Earlier than c1700	25 October 1951	TM3243373490; 52°18′37″N 1°24′30″E	1030476	High House Farmhouse More images
Huntingfield Hall	Huntingfield	Farmhouse	Late 18th century	25 October 1951	TM3421574220; 52°18′58″N 1°26′06″E	1183111	Huntingfield Hall More images
Church of St Peter	Carlton, Kelsale cum Carlton	Parish Church	Medieval	7 December 1966	TM3822364012; 52°13′22″N 1°29′11″E	1030668	Church of St Peter More images
Lych Gate to Church of St Mary and St Peter	Kelsale, Kelsale cum Carlton	Lych Gate	1890	27 July 1984	TM3878365120; 52°13′57″N 1°29′43″E	1030671	Lych Gate to Church of St Mary and St Peter More images
Kelsale Manor	Kelsale cum Carlton	Farmhouse	Earlier	25 October 1951	TM3857465293; 52°14′03″N 1°29′33″E	1030638	Upload Photo
Church of All Saints	Kesgrave	Church	Medieval	16 March 1966	TM2184445767; 52°03′57″N 1°14′07″E	1030420	Church of All Saints More images
Kettleburgh Hall	Kettleburgh	House	17th century	7 December 1966	TM2700060306; 52°11′39″N 1°19′12″E	1283207	Kettleburgh Hall More images
Buxlow Manor	Knodishall	House	1678	2 August 1983	TM4126062807; 52°12′38″N 1°31′48″E	1215749	Buxlow Manor More images
Church of St Lawrence	Knodishall	Parish Church	14th century	7 December 1966	TM4259261952; 52°12′09″N 1°32′56″E	1215745	Church of St Lawrence More images
Church of St Margaret	Leiston	Parish Church	15th century	13 March 1951	TM4387462498; 52°12′24″N 1°34′04″E	1287648	Church of St Margaret More images
Leiston House Farmhouse	Leiston	Farmhouse	17th century	13 March 1951	TM4282962928; 52°12′40″N 1°33′11″E	1287646	Upload Photo
The Long Shop	Leiston	Engineering Workshop	1853	14 October 1976	TM4438562595; 52°12′26″N 1°34′32″E	1287610	The Long Shop More images
Church of St Mary	Letheringham	Church	12th century	16 March 1966	TM2684258597; 52°10′44″N 1°18′59″E	1283700	Church of St Mary More images
Letheringham Lodge	Letheringham	Hunting Lodge	Later than 16th century	16 March 1966	TM2759457039; 52°09′53″N 1°19′35″E	1377392	Letheringham Lodge More images
Bridge Farmhouse	Linstead Parva	Farmhouse	C20	19 March 1985	TM3317477799; 52°20′55″N 1°25′20″E	1183225	Bridge Farmhouse More images
Marlesford Hall	Marlesford	House	c. 1810	21 September 1983	TM3230058500; 52°10′33″N 1°23′46″E	1278408	Marlesford Hall More images
Church of St Mary	Martlesham	Parish Church	14th century	16 March 1966	TM2624746899; 52°04′27″N 1°18′00″E	1030893	Church of St Mary More images
Old Church of St Andrew	Melton	Church	Saxon	11 June 1985	TM2952951324; 52°06′45″N 1°21′03″E	1030432	Old Church of St Andrew More images
Holy Trinity Church	Middleton	Parish Church	Medieval	7 December 1966	TM4300067777; 52°15′16″N 1°33′32″E	1030647	Holy Trinity Church More images
Moor Farmhouse	Middleton	House	Mid 16th century	25 October 1951	TM4172867783; 52°15′18″N 1°32′25″E	1199307	Upload Photo
Church of St Mary	Monewden, Suffolk Coastal	Church	11th century	16 March 1966	TM2389558532; 52°10′46″N 1°16′24″E	1377393	Church of St Mary More images
Broke Hall	Nacton	Country House	1775	16 March 1966	TM2242039065; 52°00′20″N 1°14′21″E	1283957	Broke Hall More images
Church of St Martin of Tours	Orwell Park, Nacton	Church	Medieval	16 March 1966	TM2170439693; 52°00′41″N 1°13′45″E	1198181	Church of St Martin of Tours More images
Newbourne Hall	Newbourne	Jettied House	Early 16th century	16 March 1966	TM2737442918; 52°02′17″N 1°18′50″E	1198704	Newbourne Hall More images
Church of St Mary the Virgin	Otley	Church	15th century	16 March 1966	TM2040354943; 52°08′56″N 1°13′12″E	1030302	Church of St Mary the Virgin More images
High House	Otley	Manor House	Mid 16th century	16 March 1966	TM2123454940; 52°08′54″N 1°13′56″E	1030305	Upload Photo
Moat Hall	Parham	Farmhouse	Late C16-Early 17th century	25 October 1951	TM3121059950; 52°11′21″N 1°22′52″E	1030527	Upload Photo
The Church Farmhouse	Parham	Farmhouse	Late 15th century	25 October 1951	TM3081160629; 52°11′44″N 1°22′33″E	1030535	Upload Photo
Church of St Michael and All Angels	Peasenhall	Parish Church	Medieval	7 December 1966	TM3554269208; 52°16′14″N 1°27′03″E	1183300	Church of St Michael and All Angels More images
The Ancient House	Peasenhall	House	Early-Mid 18th century	25 October 1951	TM3559069292; 52°16′17″N 1°27′06″E	1377194	The Ancient House More images
Church of St Peter and St Paul	Pettistree	Church	14th century	16 March 1966	TM2985254973; 52°08′43″N 1°21′29″E	1377418	Church of St Peter and St Paul More images
Loudham Hall	Pettistree	Country House	16th century	16 March 1966	TM3098054154; 52°08′15″N 1°22′26″E	1198856	Loudham Hall More images
Church of St Mary	Playford	Church	Late 14th century	16 March 1966	TM2176548088; 52°05′12″N 1°14′08″E	1030508	Church of St Mary More images
Playford Hall and Attached Revetments Around the Most Inner Bank of the Enclosing Moat	Playford	Country House	Late 16th century	16 March 1966	TM2134947661; 52°04′59″N 1°13′45″E	1377295	Playford Hall and Attached Revetments Around the Most Inner Bank of the Enclosing Moat More images
Church of All Saints	Ramsholt	Church	c. 1300	16 March 1966	TM3069542092; 52°01′45″N 1°21′42″E	1030735	Church of All Saints More images
Church of St Michael	Rendham	Parish Church	Medieval	7 December 1966	TM3498564494; 52°13′42″N 1°26′22″E	1199503	Church of St Michael More images
Congregational Chapel	Rendham	Sunday School	Late 19th century	7 December 1966	TM3479064685; 52°13′49″N 1°26′12″E	1030653	Upload Photo
White House Farmhouse	Rendham	Farmhouse	Early-Mid 16th century	25 October 1951	TM3591866422; 52°14′43″N 1°27′16″E	1030649	Upload Photo
Church of St Andrew	Rushmere St. Andrew	Church	Medieval	16 March 1966	TM1961546061; 52°04′10″N 1°12′10″E	1377298	Church of St Andrew More images
Church of St John Baptist	Saxmundham	Parish Church	14th century	18 July 1949	TM3890062941; 52°12′46″N 1°29′44″E	1268184	Church of St John Baptist More images
The Beeches Including Stable Block	Saxmundham	House	Early 18th century	18 July 1949	TM3859063414; 52°13′02″N 1°29′29″E	1365996	The Beeches Including Stable Block More images
Saxtead Windmill	Saxtead	Post Mill	Late 18th century	19 November 1984	TM2533664426; 52°13′55″N 1°17′54″E	1200182	Saxtead Windmill More images
Heveningham Hall Gate Lodges	Sibton	Gate Lodge	1787	7 December 1966	TM3623471698; 52°17′33″N 1°27′46″E	1030800	Heveningham Hall Gate Lodges More images
Sibton Hall	Sibton	Country House	1827	25 October 1951	TM3752370238; 52°16′44″N 1°28′50″E	1198019	Sibton Hall More images
Barn 60 Metres North West of Abbey Farmhouse	Snape	Barn	c. 1960	21 September 1983	TM3902857991; 52°10′06″N 1°29′38″E	1278251	Upload Photo
Church of St John the Baptist	Snape	Parish Church	15th century	7 December 1966	TM3950359374; 52°10′50″N 1°30′07″E	1231174	Church of St John the Baptist More images
Church of St Mary Magdalene	Sternfield	Parish Church	Probably 14th century	7 December 1966	TM3909561594; 52°12′02″N 1°29′51″E	1278252	Church of St Mary Magdalene More images
Church of St Andrew	Stratford St. Andrew	Parish Church	12th century	7 December 1966	TM3579160149; 52°11′21″N 1°26′54″E	1231407	Church of St Andrew More images
Church of All Saints	Sudbourne	Church	14th century	16 March 1966	TM4208951938; 52°06′46″N 1°32′04″E	1030844	Church of All Saints More images
Wood Hall	Sutton	Country House	1566	16 March 1966	TM3110044645; 52°03′07″N 1°22′09″E	1030700	Wood Hall More images
Church of St Mary	Sweffling	Parish Church	Late 12th century	21 December 1984	TM3473463849; 52°13′22″N 1°26′07″E	1030766	Church of St Mary More images
Church of St Mary	Swilland	Church	Medieval	16 March 1966	TM1878252969; 52°07′54″N 1°11′43″E	1030511	Church of St Mary More images
Theberton House	Theberton	House	18th century	2 August 1983	TM4453865121; 52°13′48″N 1°34′46″E	1228378	Theberton House More images
Church of St Michael	Tunstall	Tower	15th century	16 March 1966	TM3632055129; 52°08′38″N 1°27′09″E	1198044	Church of St Michael More images
Church of All Saints	Waldringfield	Parish Church	14th century	16 March 1966	TM2821944223; 52°02′58″N 1°19′37″E	1198720	Church of All Saints More images
Church of St Mary	Walpole	Parish Church	Earlier than 12th century	7 December 1966	TM3668074623; 52°19′07″N 1°28′17″E	1183285	Church of St Mary More images
Congregational Chapel	Walpole	Timber Framed House	Mid 16th century	7 December 1966	TM3735275161; 52°19′23″N 1°28′54″E	1030448	Congregational Chapel More images
The Elms	Walpole	Farmhouse	Mid 16th century	25 October 1951	TM3726275092; 52°19′21″N 1°28′49″E	1030447	Upload Photo
The Grange	Mells, Wenhaston with Mells Hamlet	Farmhouse	16th century	25 October 1951	TM3871375801; 52°19′42″N 1°30′07″E	1377270	The Grange More images
Westerfield Hall	Westerfield	House	1683	19 December 1951	TM1750948474; 52°05′31″N 1°10′25″E	1264761	Westerfield Hall More images
St Peter's Church	Westleton	Church	Collapsed 1770	7 December 1966	TM4394369036; 52°15′55″N 1°34′25″E	1283793	St Peter's Church More images
Church of All Saints	Wickham Market	Parish Church	14th century	16 March 1966	TM3022855798; 52°09′09″N 1°21′50″E	1377135	Church of All Saints More images
The Manor House	Wickham Market	House	Post 1567	16 March 1966	TM3013255871; 52°09′11″N 1°21′46″E	1030835	The Manor House More images
The White Hart Inn	Wickham Market	Coaching Inn	Late 18th century	16 March 1966	TM3016855850; 52°09′11″N 1°21′47″E	1377142	The White Hart Inn More images
Wickham Mill	Wickham Market	Watermill	Later 18th century	16 March 1966	TM3065656610; 52°09′34″N 1°22′15″E	1198526	Wickham Mill More images
Manor Farmhouse	Witnesham	Farmhouse	c. 1600	16 March 1966	TM1810250872; 52°06′47″N 1°11′02″E	1377303	Upload Photo
Red House	Witnesham	Farmhouse	Mid 16th century	16 March 1966	TM1866950266; 52°06′27″N 1°11′30″E	1377322	Red House More images
Witnesham Hall	Witnesham	House	c. 1600	16 March 1966	TM1771450820; 52°06′46″N 1°10′42″E	1030518	Witnesham Hall More images
Angel Inn	Theatre St, Woodbridge	Jettied House	16th century	25 January 1951	TM2701249191; 52°05′40″N 1°18′46″E	1030996	Angel Inn More images
Barclays Bank	4, Church St, Woodbridge	Building	Early 19th century	25 January 1951	TM2726448998; 52°05′33″N 1°18′58″E	1031088	Barclays Bank More images
Brook House	Cumberland St, Woodbridge	House	17th century	25 January 1951	TM2705948855; 52°05′29″N 1°18′47″E	1031061	Upload Photo
Burkitt House	Chapel St, Woodbridge	House	18th century	25 January 1951	TM2696849279; 52°05′43″N 1°18′44″E	1031077	Upload Photo
Buttrums Mill	Burkitt Road, Woodbridge	Windmill	1815	25 January 1951	TM2644049300; 52°05′44″N 1°18′16″E	1377013	Buttrums Mill More images
Clock House	Cumberland St, Woodbridge	Timber Framed House	Early 17th century	25 January 1951	TM2703048828; 52°05′28″N 1°18′46″E	1031063	Upload Photo
Cumberland House	Cumberland St, Woodbridge	House	18th century	25 January 1951	TM2721248917; 52°05′31″N 1°18′56″E	1377031	Cumberland House More images
Gordon House	Cumberland St, Woodbridge	House	Early 18th century	25 January 1951	TM2718948932; 52°05′31″N 1°18′54″E	1377051	Upload Photo
Norfolk House	71, Thoroughfare, Woodbridge	House	Early 18th century	20 December 1971	TM2754849197; 52°05′39″N 1°19′14″E	1200699	Norfolk House
Red House	Cumberland St, Woodbridge	House	Early 18th century	25 January 1951	TM2700648807; 52°05′28″N 1°18′44″E	1198453	Red House More images
Seckford Hospital	Woodbridge	Hospital	1840	20 December 1971	TM2656949160; 52°05′40″N 1°18′22″E	1377059	Seckford Hospital More images
Selwyn House	78, Thoroughfare, Woodbridge	House	18th century	25 January 1951	TM2756149175; 52°05′39″N 1°19′14″E	1030955	Selwyn House
The Abbey (junior School)	Woodbridge	House	1547-64	25 January 1951	TM2709449046; 52°05′35″N 1°18′50″E	1031086	The Abbey (junior School) More images
The Bridewell	Woodbridge	Timber Framed House	16th century	25 January 1951	TM2725049154; 52°05′39″N 1°18′58″E	1031045	The Bridewell More images
The Hermitage	Woodbridge	House	Mid 19th century	25 January 1951	TM2714548868; 52°05′29″N 1°18′52″E	1031053	The Hermitage More images
The Manor House	Woodbridge	Timber Framed House	Early 17th century	25 January 1951	TM2716048881; 52°05′30″N 1°18′53″E	1377047	Upload Photo
The Old Court House	Woodbridge	House	1784	25 January 1951	TM2712249147; 52°05′38″N 1°18′51″E	1031037	The Old Court House More images
28, 30 Market Hill	Woodbridge	Timber Framed House	Early 17th century	25 January 1951	TM2706449175; 52°05′39″N 1°18′48″E	1031041	28, 30 Market Hill More images
32-38, Market Hill	Woodbridge	Jettied House	16th century	25 January 1951	TM2705349184; 52°05′40″N 1°18′48″E	1199454	32-38, Market Hill
1–5, Quay Side (former Ship Inn)	Woodbridge	Inn	17th century	20 December 1971	TM2738348832; 52°05′28″N 1°19′04″E	1031008	1–5, Quay Side (former Ship Inn) More images
12 Church Street	Woodbridge	House	Late 19th century	26 May 1953	TM2722549045; 52°05′35″N 1°18′57″E	1377027	12 Church Street More images
34 Church Street	Woodbridge	House	Late 18th century	25 January 1951	TM2714649108; 52°05′37″N 1°18′53″E	1031094	34 Church Street More images
74, Thoroughfare	Woodbridge	House	Modern	25 January 1951	TM2754249145; 52°05′38″N 1°19′13″E	1030954	74, Thoroughfare More images
81 & 83, Thoroughfare	Woodbridge	House	1745	25 January 1951	TM2755349219; 52°05′40″N 1°19′14″E	1030970	81 & 83, Thoroughfare More images
97 Thoroughfare	Woodbridge	House	Early 19th century	25 January 1951	TM2759449297; 52°05′43″N 1°19′16″E	1183453	97 Thoroughfare More images
Church of St Peter	Yoxford	Parish Church	Medieval	7 December 1966	TM3943468982; 52°16′01″N 1°30′28″E	1200659	Church of St Peter More images
The Gatehouse, Cockfield Hall	Yoxford	Gatehouse	Mid 16th century	25 October 1951	TM3961069152; 52°16′06″N 1°30′37″E	1300688	The Gatehouse, Cockfield Hall
