= List of United Kingdom locations: Sand-Say =

The United Kingdom

This is part of the list of United Kingdom locations: a gazetteer of place names in the United Kingdom showing each place's locality and geographical coordinates. This list includes several locations on the Isle of Man, which is not part of the United Kingdom.

== San (continued) ==
=== Sand ===
Location	Locality	Coordinates (links to map & photo sources)	OS grid reference
Sand	Highland	57.85°N 05.54°W	NG9091
Sand	Shetland Islands	60.20°N 01.38°W	HU3447
Sand	Somerset	51.21°N 02.81°W	ST4346
Sandaig	Argyll and Bute	56.47°N 06.98°W	NL9343
Sanda Island	Argyll and Bute	55.27°N 05.58°W	NR725041
Sandal	Wakefield	53.65°N 01.50°W	SE3318
Sandale	Cumbria	54.74°N 03.18°W	NY2440
Sandal Magna	Wakefield	53.65°N 01.48°W	SE3418
Sandamhor	Highland	56.87°N 06.15°W	NM4784
Sanday	Highland	57.04°N 06.48°W	NG284039
Sanday	Orkney Islands	59.25°N 02.55°W	HY686408
Sandbach	Cheshire	53.13°N 02.37°W	SJ7560
Sandbach Heath	Cheshire	53.13°N 02.36°W	SJ7660
Sandbank	Argyll and Bute	55.97°N 04.95°W	NS1680
Sandbanks	Poole	50.68°N 01.94°W	SZ0487
Sandborough	Staffordshire	52.76°N 01.83°W	SK1119
Sandbraes	Lincolnshire	53.49°N 00.32°W	TA1101
Sandend	Aberdeenshire	57.68°N 02.75°W	NJ5566
Sanderstead	Croydon	51.33°N 00.09°W	TQ3361
Sandfields	Neath Port Talbot	51.59°N 03.82°W	SS7490
Sandfields	Staffordshire	52.66°N 01.83°W	SK1108
Sandford	Cumbria	54.53°N 02.43°W	NY7216
Sandford	Devon	50.80°N 03.67°W	SS8202
Sandford	Dorset	50.70°N 02.11°W	SY9289
Sandford	Hampshire	50.80°N 01.77°W	SU1601
Sandford	Isle of Wight	50.62°N 01.23°W	SZ5481
Sandford	Leeds	53.81°N 01.62°W	SE2535
Sandford	North Somerset	51.32°N 02.83°W	ST4259
Sandford (Knockin)	Shropshire	52.80°N 02.98°W	SJ3423
Sandford (Darliston)	Shropshire	52.90°N 02.62°W	SJ5834
Sandford	South Lanarkshire	55.66°N 04.05°W	NS7143
Sandford	Worcestershire	52.10°N 02.22°W	SO8545
Sandford Batch	North Somerset	51.31°N 02.84°W	ST4158
Sandfordhill	Aberdeenshire	57.45°N 01.81°W	NK1141
Sandford Hill	City of Stoke-on-Trent, Staffordshire	52.99°N 02.13°W	SJ9144
Sandford-on-Thames	Oxfordshire	51.70°N 01.23°W	SP5301
Sandford Orcas	Dorset	50.97°N 02.54°W	ST6220
Sandford St Martin	Oxfordshire	51.93°N 01.39°W	SP4226
Sandgate	Kent	51.07°N 01.13°E	TR2035
Sand Gate	Cumbria	54.16°N 02.99°W	SD3575
Sandgreen	Dumfries and Galloway	54.84°N 04.22°W	NX5752
Sandhaven	Aberdeenshire	57.69°N 02.06°W	NJ9667
Sandhead	Dumfries and Galloway	54.80°N 04.97°W	NX0950
Sandhill	Barnsley	53.54°N 01.35°W	SE4306
Sandhill	Buckinghamshire	51.92°N 00.93°W	SP7326
Sandhill	Cambridgeshire	52.44°N 00.30°E	TL5786
Sandhills (Glanvilles Wootton)	Dorset	50.88°N 02.45°W	ST6810
Sandhills (Chilfrome)	Dorset	50.79°N 02.59°W	ST5800
Sandhills	Leeds	53.84°N 01.43°W	SE3739
Sandhills	Liverpool	53.42°N 03.00°W	SJ3393
Sandhills	Oxfordshire	51.75°N 01.18°W	SP5607
Sandhills	Surrey	51.12°N 00.67°W	SU9337
Sandhoe	Northumberland	54.98°N 02.04°W	NY9766
Sand Hole	East Riding of Yorkshire	53.82°N 00.77°W	SE8137
Sandhole	Argyll and Bute	56.14°N 05.20°W	NS0199
Sandholme	East Riding of Yorkshire	53.76°N 00.75°W	SE8230
Sandholme	Lincolnshire	52.91°N 00.02°W	TF3337
Sandhurst	Berkshire	51.34°N 00.80°W	SU8361
Sandhurst	Gloucestershire	51.90°N 02.26°W	SO8223
Sandhurst	Kent	51.02°N 00.55°E	TQ7928
Sandhurst Cross	East Sussex	51.01°N 00.53°E	TQ7827
Sandhutton	North Yorkshire	54.23°N 01.41°W	SE3882
Sand Hutton	North Yorkshire	54.01°N 00.94°W	SE6958
Sandiacre	Derbyshire	52.91°N 01.30°W	SK4736
Sandilands	Lincolnshire	53.29°N 00.27°E	TF5280
Sandilands	South Lanarkshire	55.62°N 03.76°W	NS8938
Sandiway	Cheshire	53.23°N 02.60°W	SJ6071
Sandleheath	Dorset	50.92°N 01.83°W	SU1214
Sandleheath	Hampshire	50.93°N 01.83°W	SU1215
Sandling (Maidstone)	Kent	51.29°N 00.50°E	TQ7558
Sandling (Folkestone)	Kent	51.09°N 01.06°E	TR1436
Sandlow Green	Cheshire	53.19°N 02.33°W	SJ7866
Sandness	Shetland Islands	60.29°N 01.67°W	HU1857
Sandon	Essex	51.70°N 00.51°E	TL7404
Sandon	Hertfordshire	51.98°N 00.07°W	TL3234
Sandon	Staffordshire	52.85°N 02.09°W	SJ9429
Sandonbank	Staffordshire	52.84°N 02.09°W	SJ9428
Sandown	Isle of Wight	50.65°N 01.16°W	SZ5984
Sandown Park	Kent	51.13°N 00.28°E	TQ6040
Sandpit	Dorset	50.83°N 02.82°W	ST4204
Sandpits	Gloucestershire	51.95°N 02.24°W	SO8329
Sandplace	Cornwall	50.37°N 04.46°W	SX2556
Sand Point	North Somerset	51.38°N 02.97°W	ST325657
Sandray	Western Isles	56.89°N 07.51°W	NL643913
Sandridge	Hertfordshire	51.77°N 00.30°W	TL1710
Sandringham	Norfolk	52.82°N 00.50°E	TF6928
Sands	Buckinghamshire	51.62°N 00.80°W	SU8393
Sands End	Hammersmith and Fulham	51.46°N 00.18°W	TQ2676
Sandsend	North Yorkshire	54.49°N 00.67°W	NZ8612
Sand Side	Cumbria	54.22°N 03.19°W	SD2282
Sand Side	Dumfries and Galloway	54.81°N 04.05°W	NX6849
Sand Side	Lancashire	53.94°N 02.86°W	SD4350
Sandside (Ulverston)	Cumbria	54.18°N 03.07°W	SD3077
Sandside (Beetham)	Cumbria	54.21°N 02.79°W	SD4880
Sandsound	Shetland Islands	60.21°N 01.37°W	HU3548
Sandtoft	North Lincolnshire	53.56°N 00.88°W	SE7408
Sandvoe	Shetland Islands	60.60°N 01.36°W	HU3591
Sandway	Kent	51.22°N 00.69°E	TQ8851
Sandwell	West Midlands	52.49°N 01.97°W	SP0289
Sandwich	Kent	51.27°N 01.33°E	TR3358
Sandwich Bay Estate	Kent	51.26°N 01.38°E	TR3657
Sandwick (Whalsay)	Shetland Islands	60.33°N 01.02°W	HU5461
Sandwick (Mainland)	Shetland Islands	59.99°N 01.23°W	HU4323
Sandwith	Cumbria	54.51°N 03.60°W	NX9614
Sandwith Newtown	Cumbria	54.51°N 03.60°W	NX9614
Sandy	Bedfordshire	52.12°N 00.30°W	TL1649
Sandy	Carmarthenshire	51.67°N 04.18°W	SN4900
Sandy Bank	Lincolnshire	53.07°N 00.12°W	TF2655
Sandy Carrs	Durham	54.77°N 01.39°W	NZ3942
Sandycroft	Flintshire	53.18°N 03.00°W	SJ3366
Sandy Cross	East Sussex	50.95°N 00.24°E	TQ5820
Sandy Cross	Surrey	51.21°N 00.74°W	SU8847
Sandy Down	Hampshire	50.78°N 01.56°W	SZ3199
Sandyford	City of Stoke-on-Trent, Staffordshire	53.06°N 02.22°W	SJ8552
Sandy Gate	Devon	50.70°N 03.47°W	SX9691
Sandygate	Devon	50.55°N 03.61°W	SX8674
Sandygate	Isle of Man	54.34°N 04.50°W	SC3797
Sandygate	Sheffield	53.37°N 01.53°W	SK3186
Sandy Haven	Pembrokeshire	51.72°N 05.11°W	SM8507
Sandylake	Cornwall	50.40°N 04.64°W	SX1260
Sandylands	Lancashire	54.06°N 02.88°W	SD4263
Sandylands	Somerset	50.99°N 03.25°W	ST1222
Sandy Lane	Swansea	51.57°N 04.09°W	SS5588
Sandy Lane	Bradford	53.81°N 01.84°W	SE1035
Sandy Lane	Wiltshire	51.40°N 02.05°W	ST9667
Sandy Lane	Wrexham	52.95°N 02.89°W	SJ4040
Sandy Way	Isle of Wight	50.63°N 01.36°W	SZ4582

=== Sang–Sant ===
Location	Locality	Coordinates (links to map & photo sources)	OS grid reference
Sangobeg	Highland	58.55°N 04.71°W	NC4266
Sangomore	Highland	58.56°N 04.75°W	NC4067
Sanham Green	Berkshire	51.39°N 01.52°W	SU3366
Sankey Bridges	Cheshire	53.37°N 02.63°W	SJ5887
Sankyns Green	Worcestershire	52.27°N 02.30°W	SO7964
Sanna	Highland	56.74°N 06.18°W	NM4469
Sanna Point	Highland	56.74°N 06.17°W	NM450697
Sanndabhaig (Stornoway)	Western Isles	58.20°N 06.35°W	NB4432
Sanndabhaig (East Gerinish)	Western Isles	57.36°N 07.29°W	NF8243
Sannox	North Ayrshire	55.65°N 05.16°W	NS0145
Sanquhar	Dumfries and Galloway	55.36°N 03.92°W	NS7809
Sansaw Heath	Shropshire	52.79°N 02.72°W	SJ5122
Santon	Cumbria	54.39°N 03.38°W	NY1001
Santon	North Lincolnshire	53.59°N 00.61°W	SE9212
Santon Bridge	Cumbria	54.39°N 03.37°W	NY1101
Santon Downham	Suffolk	52.45°N 00.66°E	TL8187
Santon Head	Isle of Man	54.10°N 04.55°W	SC331706

== Sap–Say ==
Location	Locality	Coordinates (links to map & photo sources)	OS grid reference
Sapcote	Leicestershire	52.53°N 01.29°W	SP4893
Sapey Bridge	Herefordshire	52.19°N 02.41°W	SO7255
Sapey Common	Herefordshire	52.27°N 02.44°W	SO7064
Sapiston	Suffolk	52.34°N 00.80°E	TL9175
Sapley	Cambridgeshire	52.34°N 00.18°W	TL2473
Sapperton	Derbyshire	52.90°N 01.73°W	SK1834
Sapperton	Gloucestershire	51.72°N 02.08°W	SO9403
Sapperton	Lincolnshire	52.88°N 00.50°W	TF0133
Saracen's Head	Lincolnshire	52.82°N 00.01°W	TF3427
Sarclet	Highland	58.37°N 03.13°W	ND3443
Sardis	Carmarthenshire	51.73°N 04.05°W	SN5806
Sardis (south Pembrokeshire)	Pembrokeshire	51.74°N 04.94°W	SM970087
Sardis (southeast Pembrokeshire)	Pembrokeshire	51.72°N 04.70°W	SN1306
Sarisbury	Hampshire	50.86°N 01.29°W	SU5008
Sarn	Bridgend	51.53°N 03.58°W	SS9083
Sarn	Flintshire	53.30°N 03.33°W	SJ1179
Sarn	Powys	52.50°N 03.18°W	SO2090
Sarnau	Ceredigion	52.12°N 04.47°W	SN3150
Sarnau	Gwynedd	52.93°N 03.53°W	SH9739
Sarnau (Brecon)	Powys	51.97°N 03.42°W	SO0232
Sarnau (Arddleen)	Powys	52.72°N 03.14°W	SJ2315
Sarn Bach	Gwynedd	52.80°N 04.52°W	SH3026
Sarnesfield	Herefordshire	52.14°N 02.92°W	SO3750
Sarn Meyllteyrn	Gwynedd	52.85°N 04.63°W	SH2332
Saron (Llangeler)	Carmarthenshire	52.00°N 04.37°W	SN3737
Saron (Swansea)	Carmarthenshire	51.78°N 04.03°W	SN6012
Saron	Denbighshire	53.12°N 03.46°W	SJ0260
Saron (Bethel)	Gwynedd	53.16°N 04.21°W	SH5265
Saron (Cernarfon)	Gwynedd	53.09°N 04.30°W	SH4658
Sarratt	Hertfordshire	51.68°N 00.49°W	TQ0499
Sarre	Kent	51.33°N 01.22°E	TR2564
Sarsden	Oxfordshire	51.90°N 01.59°W	SP2823
Sarsden Halt	Oxfordshire	51.91°N 01.60°W	SP2724
Sartfield	Isle of Man	54.36°N 04.54°W	SC3599
Sascott	Shropshire	52.69°N 02.85°W	SJ4211
Satley	Durham	54.78°N 01.83°W	NZ1143
Satmar	Kent	51.10°N 01.21°E	TR2539
Satron	North Yorkshire	54.36°N 02.10°W	SD9397
Satterleigh	Devon	50.98°N 03.91°W	SS6622
Satterthwaite	Cumbria	54.31°N 03.03°W	SD3392
Satwell	Oxfordshire	51.54°N 00.99°W	SU7083
Sauchen	Aberdeenshire	57.18°N 02.51°W	NJ6911
Saucher	Perth and Kinross	56.48°N 03.31°W	NO1933
Sauchie	Clackmannanshire	56.128°N 03.781°W	NS8994
Saughall	Cheshire	53.22°N 02.96°W	SJ3670
Saughall Massie	Wirral	53.38°N 03.12°W	SJ2588
Saughton	City of Edinburgh	55.92°N 03.28°W	NT2071
Saughtree	Scottish Borders	55.25°N 02.69°W	NY5696
Saul	Gloucestershire	51.77°N 02.37°W	SO7409
Saundby	Nottinghamshire	53.38°N 00.82°W	SK7888
Saundersfoot	Pembrokeshire	51.70°N 04.70°W	SN1304
Saunderton	Buckinghamshire	51.70°N 00.85°W	SP7901
Saunderton Lee	Buckinghamshire	51.68°N 00.84°W	SU8099
Saunton	Devon	51.11°N 04.21°W	SS4537
Sausthorpe	Lincolnshire	53.20°N 00.06°E	TF3869
Saval	Highland	58.03°N 04.40°W	NC5808
Saveock	Cornwall	50.26°N 05.15°W	SW7545
Saverley Green	Staffordshire	52.93°N 02.06°W	SJ9638
Savile Park	Calderdale	53.70°N 01.88°W	SE0823
Savile Town	Kirklees	53.67°N 01.63°W	SE2420
Sawbridge	Warwickshire	52.28°N 01.26°W	SP5065
Sawbridgeworth	Hertfordshire	51.81°N 00.14°E	TL4815
Sawdon	North Yorkshire	54.24°N 00.55°W	SE9484
Sawley	Derbyshire	52.87°N 01.30°W	SK4731
Sawley	Lancashire	53.91°N 02.35°W	SD7746
Sawley	North Yorkshire	54.09°N 01.63°W	SE2467
Sawood	Bradford	53.80°N 01.94°W	SE0434
Sawston	Cambridgeshire	52.11°N 00.16°E	TL4849
Sawtry	Cambridgeshire	52.43°N 00.29°W	TL1683
Sawyer's Hill	Somerset	50.97°N 03.19°W	ST1620
Sawyers Hill	Wiltshire	51.60°N 01.97°W	SU0290
Saxby	Leicestershire	52.77°N 00.78°W	SK8220
Saxby	Lincolnshire	53.36°N 00.49°W	TF0086
Saxby	West Sussex	50.81°N 00.63°W	SU9603
Saxby All Saints	North Lincolnshire	53.63°N 00.50°W	SE9916
Saxelbye	Leicestershire	52.77°N 00.96°W	SK7020
Saxham Street	Suffolk	52.20°N 01.04°E	TM0861
Saxilby	Lincolnshire	53.26°N 00.66°W	SK8975
Saxlingham	Norfolk	52.91°N 01.00°E	TG0239
Saxlingham Green	Norfolk	52.51°N 01.30°E	TM2496
Saxlingham Nethergate	Norfolk	52.52°N 01.27°E	TM2297
Saxmundham	Suffolk	52.21°N 01.48°E	TM3863
Saxondale	Nottinghamshire	52.94°N 00.98°W	SK6839
Saxon Street	Cambridgeshire	52.20°N 00.44°E	TL6759
Saxtead	Suffolk	52.23°N 01.30°E	TM2665
Saxtead Green	Suffolk	52.22°N 01.29°E	TM2564
Saxtead Little Green	Suffolk	52.23°N 01.29°E	TM2565
Saxthorpe	Norfolk	52.82°N 01.13°E	TG1130
Saxton	North Yorkshire	53.81°N 01.28°W	SE4736
Sayers Common	West Sussex	50.94°N 00.20°W	TQ2618
