= Sandy Lane =

Sandy Lane may refer to:

- Sandy Lane (resort), a resort in Barbados
- Sandy Lane, Wiltshire, England
- Sandy Lane, West Yorkshire, England
- Sandy Lane, Wrexham, Wales, a hamlet in Maelor South community
- Sandy Lane, previous home stadium of English football team Worksop Town F.C.
- Sandy Lane, proposed new home stadium of English football team Cray Wanderers F.C.
