= Saxtead Green =

Village in Suffolk, England

Coordinates: 52.23265°N 1.30246°E

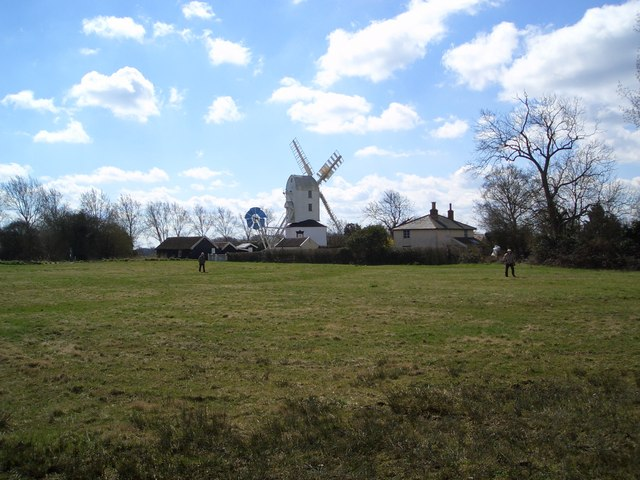
- View of the green and the windmill

- Location within Suffolk
- Civil parish: Saxtead
- District: East Suffolk
- Shire county: Suffolk
- Region: East
- Country: England
- Sovereign state: United Kingdom

Saxtead Green is a village on the A1120 road and the B1119 road, in the civil parish of Saxtead, near the town of Framlingham, in the East Suffolk district, in the county of Suffolk, England.

== See also ==
- Saxtead Green Windmill
