= R. W. Symonds =

British architect

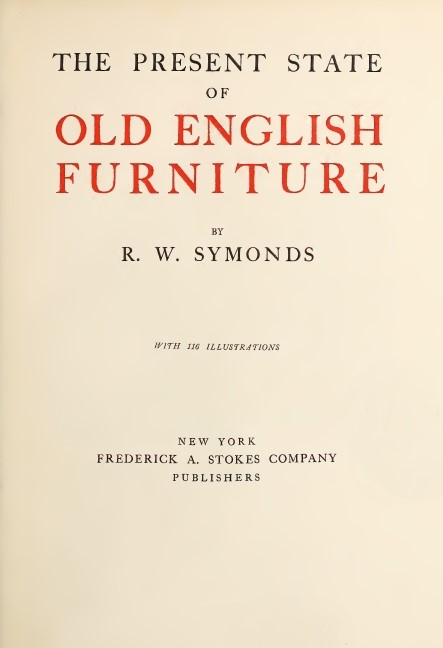
Title page of the American edition of Symonds' first work The present state of old English furniture

Robert Wemyss Symonds FRIBA (31 December 1889 – 5 September 1958) was a British architect, and "the pre-eminent 20th century scholar and authority on English furniture". His complicated love life, before he married respectably, included affairs with two women, the first of which produced children he never acknowledged, and the second with a woman who he discovered was already married and who was subsequently jailed for perjury in her divorce case.

== Early life ==
Robert Symonds was born on 31 December 1889, the son of the artists William Robert Symonds and Margaret Hogg Swan Symonds. He was educated at St Paul's School, London.

== Family ==
Symonds married Daphne Loveland in 1921. They had two daughters, Anne and Virginia, before her death in 1948. Symonds married secondly Monica Sheila Harrington in 1948, the daughter of Sir H. M. Grayson, Bt.

In his youth, Symonds had an affair with Lily Sapzells, a woman of Lithuanian Jewish origin, that produced two children, John (1914–2006), an author and the literary executor of Aleister Crowley, and a daughter. Symonds did not acknowledge either child and they were brought up by their mother in Margate, although he paid for the family's upkeep.

== Mrs Bamberger ==
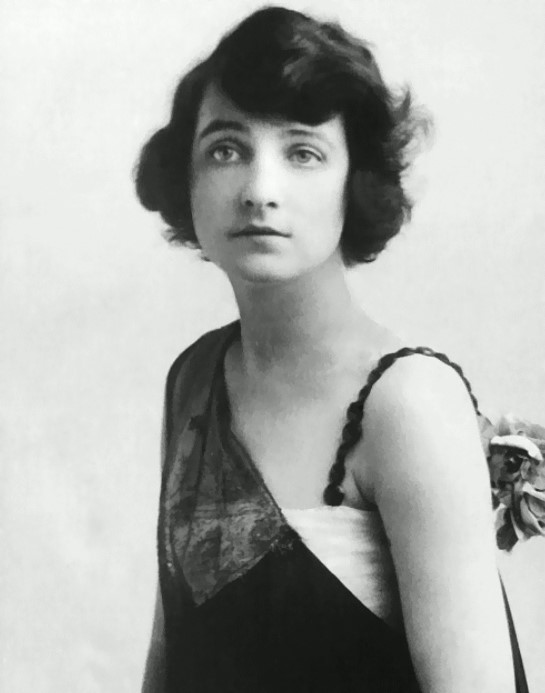
Mrs Bamberger

Symonds also had an affair with Thelma Dorothy Bamberger who, according to his account, he met on the London Underground in 1914. He did not serve in the military during the First World War due to ill health, instead working as a designer and decorator. Symonds and Bamberger became engaged and lived together for four years despite Symonds discovering not long after they met that she was married. Symonds requested that Bamberger obtain a divorce from her husband who was serving in the military, resulting in a complicated divorce case heard in 1920 that soon after resulted in Bamberger's prosecution for perjury in respect of her testimony.

Bamberger claimed that Symonds had threatened her with acid and tried to kill her, but Symonds said that he had never been violent towards her, but that she had cut his head open and on another occasion thrust a pair of curling tongs in his ear; he also claimed that she had poured acid over him at a hotel where they were staying. Bamberger was found guilty of eight counts of perjury relating to her testimony in the divorce court and sentenced to nine months' imprisonment in a case that was regarded as unusual at the time due to the rareness of prosecutions for perjury arising from testimony in divorce proceedings.

== Career ==
Symonds trained as an architect and for a time was in partnership with Robert Lutyens, the son of Sir Edwin Lutyens. He was consulting architect for the rebuilding of the Middlesex Hospital in 1931–34 and after the Second World War for St Swithin's House (1949–53), built on the site of the former Salters' Hall. He was a fellow of the Royal Institute of British Architects.

== Furniture and clocks ==
Symonds was described by The Winterthur Library as "the pre-eminent 20th century scholar and authority on English furniture", of which he was also an important collector. He designed modern furniture in what he described as the "Modern English Traditional School". He wrote extensively on furniture and also produced several books on antique clocks. Both of his first books, The present state of old English furniture (1921) and Old English walnut & lacquer furniture (1922), were highly detailed treatises on the methods of the fakers that plagued the antiques trade at that time. He also wrote on English clocks and a biography of the Restoration horologist Thomas Tompion in an attempt to restore his reputation. A bibliography of his works was produced by Colin Streeter and Margaret Barker and published in Furniture History in 1975.

== Death and legacy ==
The Ancient House, Peasenhall.

Symonds died at his home of The Ancient House, Peasenhall, Suffolk on 5 September 1958. He was survived by his wife Monica. His research papers and approximately 9,000 photographs were acquired by the Winterthur Library in 1959.

== Selected publications ==
Works by Symonds include:

- The present state of old English furniture. Duckworth, London, 1921.
- Old English walnut & lacquer furniture. The present-day condition and value and the methods of the furniture-faker in producing spurious pieces &c. Herbert Jenkins, London, 1923 [1922].
- English furniture from Charles II to George II. A full account of the design, material and quality of workmanship of walnut and mahogany furniture of this period; and of how spurious specimens are made. The Connoisseur, 1929.
- Masterpieces of English furniture and clocks. A study of walnut and mahogany furniture ... together with an account of Thomas Tompion and other famous clockmakers of the 17th and 18th centuries. B.T. Batsford, London, 1940.
- A History of English Clocks. Penguin Books, London, 1947. (King Penguin Books No. K28)
- Veneered walnut furniture 1660–1760. Alec Tiranti, 1947.
- A book of English clocks. Penguin Books, London, 1950.
- Thomas Tompion: His life and work. Batsford, London, 1951.
- Furniture making in seventeenth and eighteenth century England. An outline for collectors. The Connoisseur, London, 1955.
