= Farnham Manor =

Manor house in Farnham, Suffolk, England

Coordinates: 52°11′10″N 1°27′33″E

Farnham Manor is a grade II listed house in Farnham, Suffolk, England. It is timber-framed and dates from at least 1602 based on a year marked on plasterwork in the house.
