= Friston Windmill =

Windmill in Suffolk, England

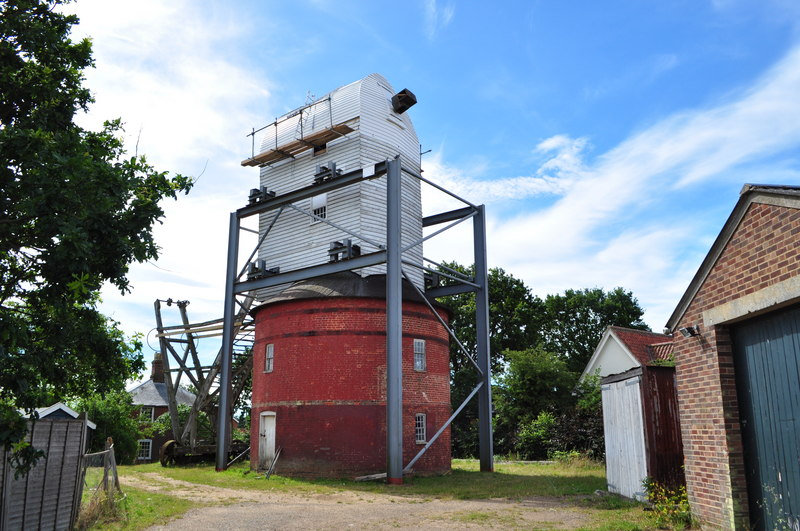
- Friston Windmill in July 2010

Origin
- Mill name: Friston Windmill
- Mill location: TM 411 601
- Coordinates: 52°11′12″N 1°31′34″E
- Operator(s): Private
- Year built: 1812

Information
- Purpose: Corn mill
- Type: Post mill
- No. of sails: Four sails
- Type of sails: Patent sails
- Windshaft: Cast iron
- Winding: Fantail
- Fantail blades: Six blades

Friston Windmill is a Grade II* listed post mill at Friston, Suffolk, England which has been conserved.

== History ==
Friston Windmill was moved from Woodbridge by Collins, the Melton millwright in 1812 and erected on land purchased by William and Mary Scarlett. They sold the mill to Joseph Collings in 1812. The mill was worked by several different millers until 1837 when it was purchased by Joshua Reynolds from Knodishall. The mill passed to Caleb Reynolds Wright in 1883 and to his son Caleb Reynolds Wright Jr. in 1924. A pair of sails was removed in 1943 and not replaced due to the shortage of timber. The mill worked on two sails until 1956 and then by a diesel engine until 1964.

In 1965, permission was granted for the demolition of the mill but this was not carried out. Due to changes in planning law, permission had to be sought again in 1968. Villagers were divided as to whether the mill should be kept or demolished and there was much debate in the local newspapers. A millwright was asked to inspect the mill and the decision was deferred for a month. The millwrights’ report showed that the mill was structurally sound and it was agreed in principle that the mill should be moved to the East Anglian Rural Life Museum at Stowmarket, where plans for the museum included a windmill. Meanwhile, money was raised locally and repairs started on the mill in 1971. Permission for demolition was rescinded and on the death of the last miller in 1972 a new owner bought the mill with the intention of preserving it. In 1977, the body of the mill was restored by Messrs Jameson Marshall, millwrights.

In 2003, English Heritage gave a grant covering 20% of the cost of repairs which then needed doing to the mill. In 2004, it was announced that a steel framework was to be erected around the mill in order to allow work on the trestle and body of the mill.

== Description ==
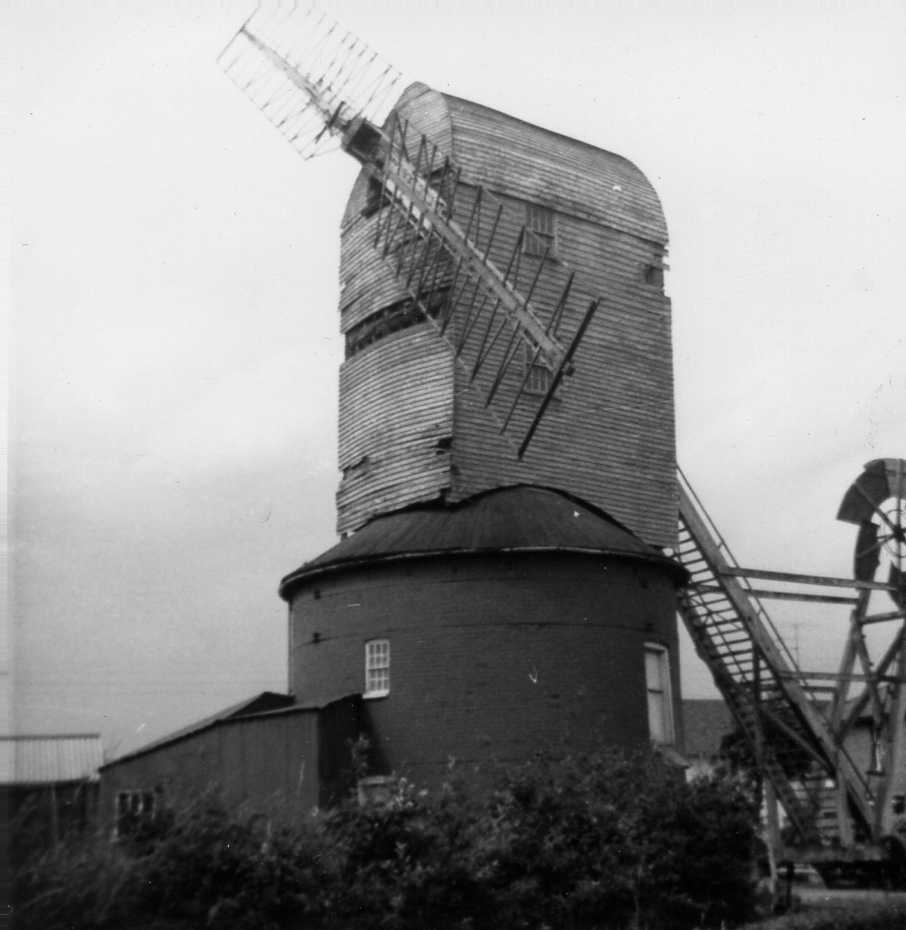
Friston Mill in 1965

Friston Windmill is a tall post mill with a roundhouse. It had four Patent sails and was winded by a fantail carried on the rear steps in the Suffolk style. The mill is 50 feet (15.24 m) high, making it the tallest surviving post mill in the United Kingdom. The mill has been preserved but the three pairs of millstones have been removed. The mill had two pairs of millstones in the breast and one pair in the tail.

== Millers ==
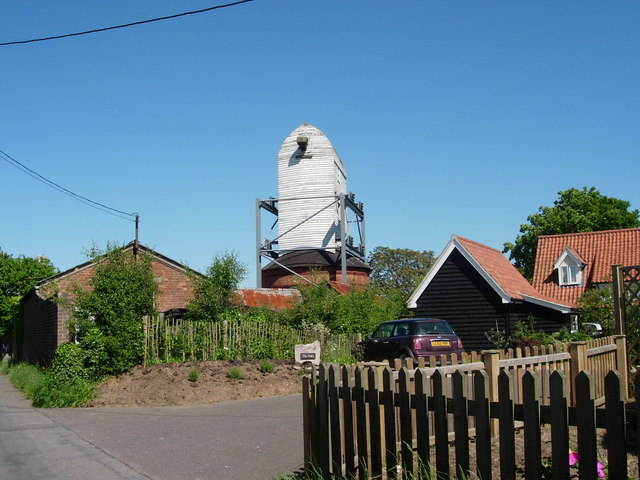
The mill in 2006

- William and Mary Scarlett 1812
- Joseph Collings 1812 –
- Robert Reynolds 1850s
- John Reynolds 1850s
- Joshua Reynolds 1850s – 1883
- Caleb Reynolds Wright 1883 – 1924
- Caleb Reynolds Wright Jr. 1924 – 1964

Reference for above:-
