= Robert Hitcham =

English politician

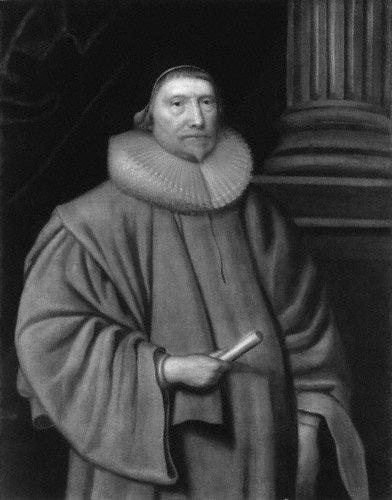
Portrait of Sir Robert Hitcham belonging to the National Portrait Gallery, and on display in the Royal Courts of Justice

Sir Robert Hitcham (1572? – 1636) was a Member of Parliament and Attorney General under King James I.

== Early life ==
Robert was born of lowly origin in Levington, near Ipswich, and educated at the Free School at Ipswich and later Pembroke College, Cambridge, studying law. He was admitted to Gray's Inn on 3 November 1589 from Barnard's Inn and was called to the Bar in 1595.

== Political career ==
He became a Member of Parliament for West Looe, Cornwall from 1597 to 1598; for King's Lynn, Norfolk from 1604 to 1611; for Cambridge in 1614 and for Orford, Suffolk from 1624 to 1626.

He was knighted on 29 June 1604 by King James I. Hitcham held a number of posts including: Attorney-General to Anne of Denmark, Queen Consort to James I (1603–1614); Sergeant-at-law (1614); and King's Senior Sergeant-at-law (1616).

Hitcham was appointed attorney to Anne of Denmark in September 1603. The royal court was at Woodstock Palace because of the plague in London. Thomas Crewe wrote that Hitcham had "her hand and signet to practice within the bar, and take place next to the King's Counsel". When he became Sergeant-at-law in 1614, Lawrence Hyde became the Queen's Attorney.

== Later life ==
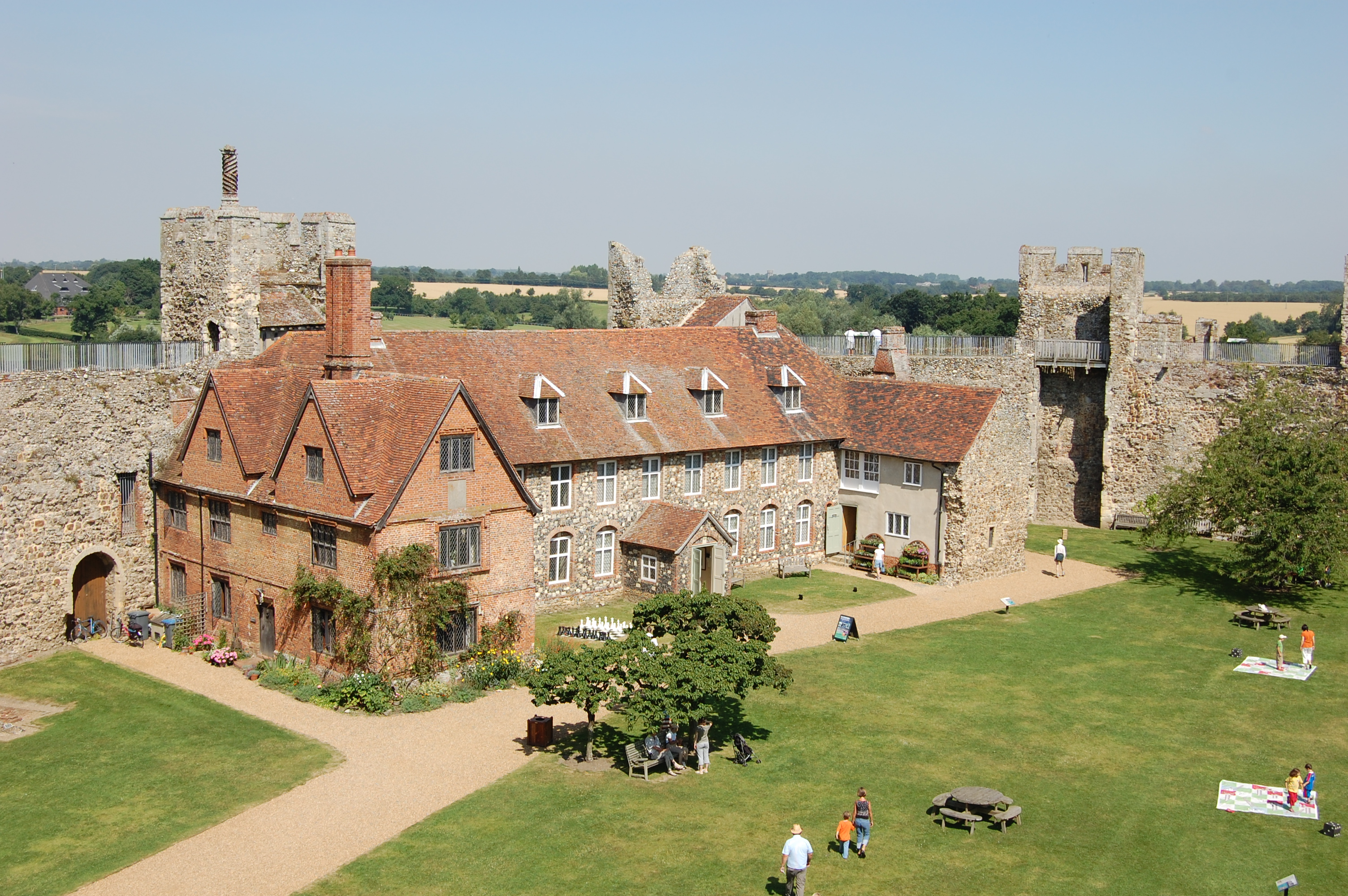
Framlingham Castle poor house

On 14 May 1635 he purchased Framlingham Castle, Suffolk from Theophilus Howard, 2nd Earl of Suffolk for the sum of £14,000.

He died on 15 August 1636 and now lies in a tomb in the Church of St Michael the Archangel, Framlingham.

== Legacy ==
His will stated that the castle, save for the outer walls, be demolished and the stone used to build a poor house. The inner buildings were duly demolished and a poor house, Sir Robert Hitcham's Almshouses, was built in its place. He also endowed a school for local children (originally boys only), which was the foundation of the current Framlingham Sir Robert Hitcham primary school. His also left money in his will to fund a school in both Debenham & Coggeshall. With the school in Debenham being named after him; Sir Robert Hitcham CEVA Primary School.

He bequeathed the site of the castle to the Master, Fellows and Scholars of Pembroke College, Cambridge. Some of the land he left was later given by the College as the site for Framlingham College, a school built as a memorial to Prince Albert.

Hitcham's Cloister in Pembroke College (built 1666) was named after him as is the Hitcham House at Thomas Mills High School in Framlingham.
