= William R. Symonds =

English painter

William Robert Symonds (1851 – 7 November 1934) was an English painter. He specialised in genre scenes, often sentimental, or involving children and animals.

== Life ==
Born in Yoxford, Suffolk, he studied in Antwerp and settled in London in 1881. He exhibited regularly at the Royal Academy from 1876. His son was the architect and furniture expert Robert Wemyss Symonds.

== Works ==
Symonds painted the originals for some famous prints, the most notable being Heather, painted c. 1909. His paintings hang in the Wallace Collection in London and Christchurch Mansion in Suffolk. Twenty-two of his oil painting portraits are in UK public collections, in particular Colchester and Ipswich Museums.

== Paintings ==
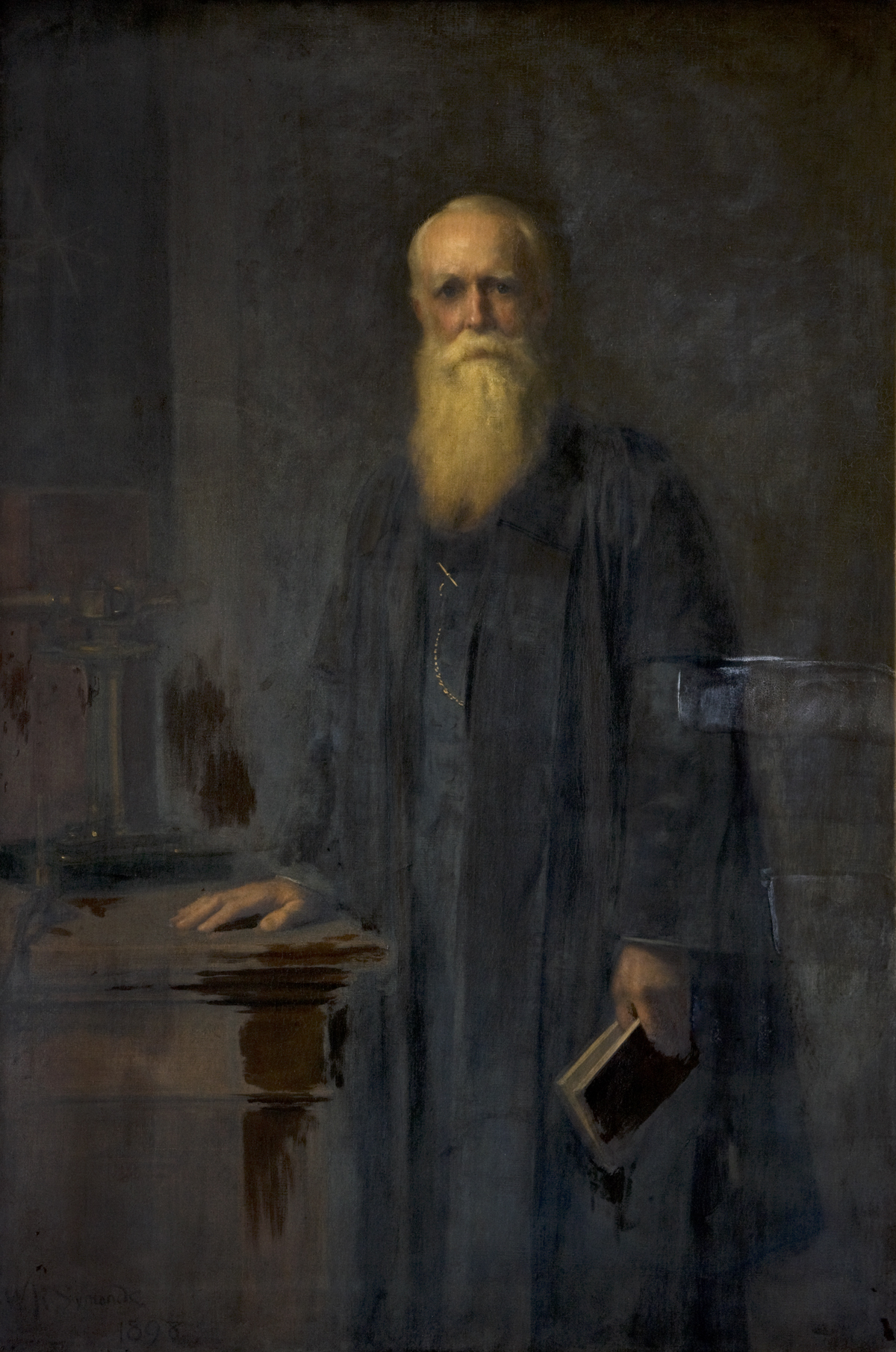
Joseph David Everett portrayed by William R. Symonds

- Heather
- Girl with a Silver Fish
- A painting of Sir Richard Wallace, 1885
- Babes in the Wood
- Family Group Portrait of Mr, Mrs and Master Hollond of Benhall Lodge, 1887
- His Lordship
- Portret kobiety, 1901
- An illustration for The Frog Prince
- Portrait of Clarice H. Edwards as young girl, 1904
- Portrait of Mr Arthur Ross and Companion portrait of his wife
- Indian Elephant, 1918
