= Joan Liversidge =

British archaeologist

Joan Eileen Annie Liversidge FSA (May 1914 - 16 January 1984) was an English archaeologist who specialised in Roman Britain.

== Biography ==
Liversidge was an Honorary Keeper of the University Museum of Archaeology and Anthropology at the University of Cambridge, a research fellow at Newnham College, Cambridge, and a faculty lecturer at Cambridge. She was a Founding Fellow of Lucy Cavendish College, Cambridge.

Her work was focussed on artefactual and artistic evidence. Liversidge took a social history approach to Roman Britain which was undervalued in subsequent decades.

As with the undervaluing of her social history approach, her findings that several Roman villas in Britain (Box, Atworth, East Grinstead, Stroud, and Titsey) were of more than one storey in height were overshadowed by assertions of R.G.Collingwood and Ian Richmond that such structures had only one story, but re-evaluations in 1982 found that such buildings could be of greater height.

She was secretary of the Cambridge Antiquarian Society for 25 years. She was elected a fellow of the Society of Antiquaries of London in 1951.

== Selected publications ==
- Furniture in Roman Britain. Tiranti, London, 1955.
- Britain in the Roman Empire. Routledge & Kegan Paul, 1968.
- Roman Gaul: Illustrated from contemporary sources. Longman, London, 1974. ISBN 058220531X
- Everyday life in the Roman Empire. Batsford, 1976. ISBN 071343239X
- Roman provincial wall painting of the Western Empire. British Archaeological Reports, 1982. (Editor)
