= Tiranti =

British retailer

- Industry: retailer
- Founded: 1895; 130 years ago
- Founder: Giovanni (John) Tiranti
- Headquarters: Campbell Road, Stoke-on-Trent, England
- Services: art supplies, sculpture supplies.

Tiranti logo

Tiranti is an art supply retailer, bookstore, and former publisher based in Stoke-on-Trent, England, Tiranti supplies sculptors' tools and equipment, and supplies materials for carving, mouldmaking, modelling, restoration and casting. It also sells art books and media. The firm dates back to 1895 when it was founded by Giovanni (John) Tiranti. In the twentieth century it was a noted art book publisher as Alec Tiranti, specialising in sculpture and furniture.

Tiranti was at first based in London, although at different location now; its shop was twice destroyed by bombs in the London blitz. The business was moved to Thatcham in 2005. In 2021 Alec Tiranti were bought out by the Potterycrafts Business Group and the business was relocated to Campbell Road, Stoke-on-Trent in September of that year where the Potterycrafts business headquarters are based.

== Publishing ==
Among the books the firm published were R.W. Symonds' Veneered walnut furniture 1660-1760 (1947), and Frederick Gibberd's Built in Furniture in Great Britain in 1948. In 1951 they published architect and furniture designer Ernő Goldfinger's British Furniture Today and in 1955, Joan Liversidge's Furniture in Roman Britain.

In sculpture and art Tiranti published pioneering sculptor Leon Underwood's Masks of West Africa in 1951 and his Figures in wood of West Africa in 1964. Masks was praised in review for the dual French-English text and the inclusion of photographs of masks previously unillustrated. Techniques were an important part of their output and they published New materials in Sculpture by Hubert Montagu Percy in 1962 and Modelled Portrait Heads by T.B. Huxley-Jones, together with a series of technical booklets.

The publishing side of the business ended with the death of Alec Tiranti in 1971.
