= A1120 road =

Road in Suffolk, England

A1120

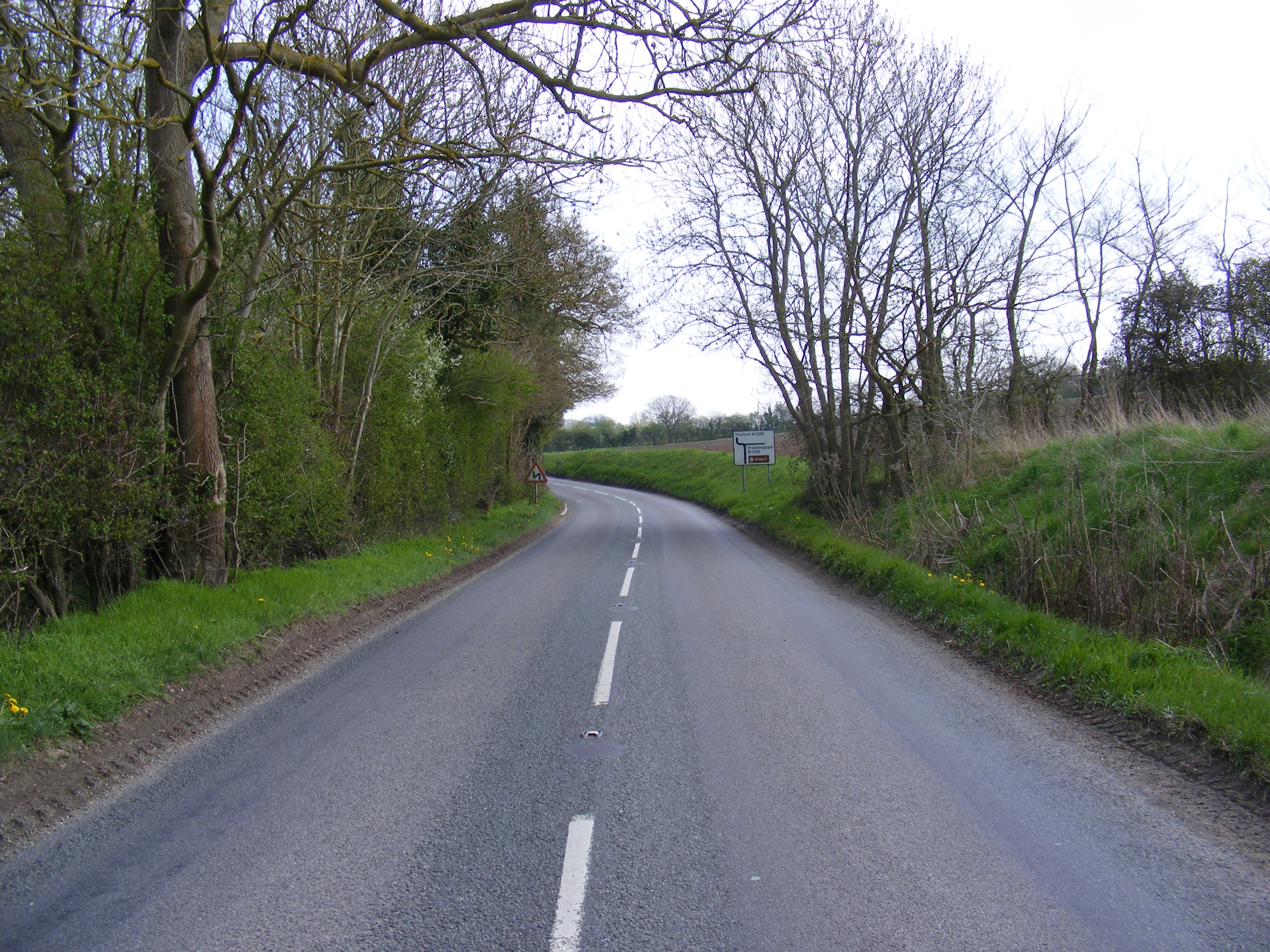
- A1120 Dennington Road

Route information
- Length: 26.0 mi (41.8 km)

Major junctions
- Southwest end: Stowmarket
- A1308; A14 A140; A12
- Northeast end: Yoxford

Location
- Country: United Kingdom
- Constituent country: England
- Primary destinations: Stowupland, Earl Soham, Dennington, Peasenhall

Road network
- Roads in the United Kingdom; Motorways; A and B road zones
← A1117	→ A1121

The A1120 is an 'A' road in the English county of Suffolk. It links Stowmarket to Yoxford passing through the centre of the county. It is 26 miles (42 km) long.

== Route ==
From west to east the road passes through the following settlements:

- Stowmarket A14
- Stowupland B1115 (incorrectly labelled as B1151 on some sat-nav devices)
- Earl Stonham
- Stonham Parva A140
- Stonham Aspal
- Pettaugh B1077
- Earl Soham
- Saxtead B1119
- Dennington B1116
- Badingham B1120
- Peasenhall
- Sibton
- Yoxford A12

== History ==
=== Original Cambridge route ===
The A1120 was the original Cambridge southern bypass, upgraded from the B1046 in the early 1930s.

Starting on the A603 Newnham Road the A1120 headed east along The Fen Causeway, which was only built in the mid-1920s (and opened as part of the B1046). A staggered crossroads took the road over the A10 Trumpington Road, after which the road ran northeastwards along Lensfield Road and East Road, to end on the A45 Newmarket Road.

In 1935, the A1120 was renumbered as an eastern extension of the A603 itself. The Fen Causeway has since been renumbered as part of the A1134 ring road, although the A603 is still here as the junior partner in a multiplex.
