= Seckford Hospital =

Former hospital in Woodbridge, Suffolk, England

Coordinates: 52.09429°N 1.30683°E

Seckford Hospital

Seckford Hospital is a grade II* listed former almshouse in Seckford Street, Woodbridge, Suffolk, England. It is of red brick with yellow brick dressings and was built by James Noble in 1840 to a design by Charles Cockerell. Despite its name, Seckford Hospital was never a hospital in the modern sense. Almshouses, providing charitable housing to the poor, were also known as bedehouses, poorhouses or hospitals. Today, as part of Seckford Care, Seckford Hospital provides care and support to older people and continues to be operated by The Seckford Trust founded by Thomas Seckford in the late 16th Century.
