= Sandford, Hampshire =

Hamlet in Hampshire, England

Coordinates: 50.816410°N 1.767818°W

Sandford
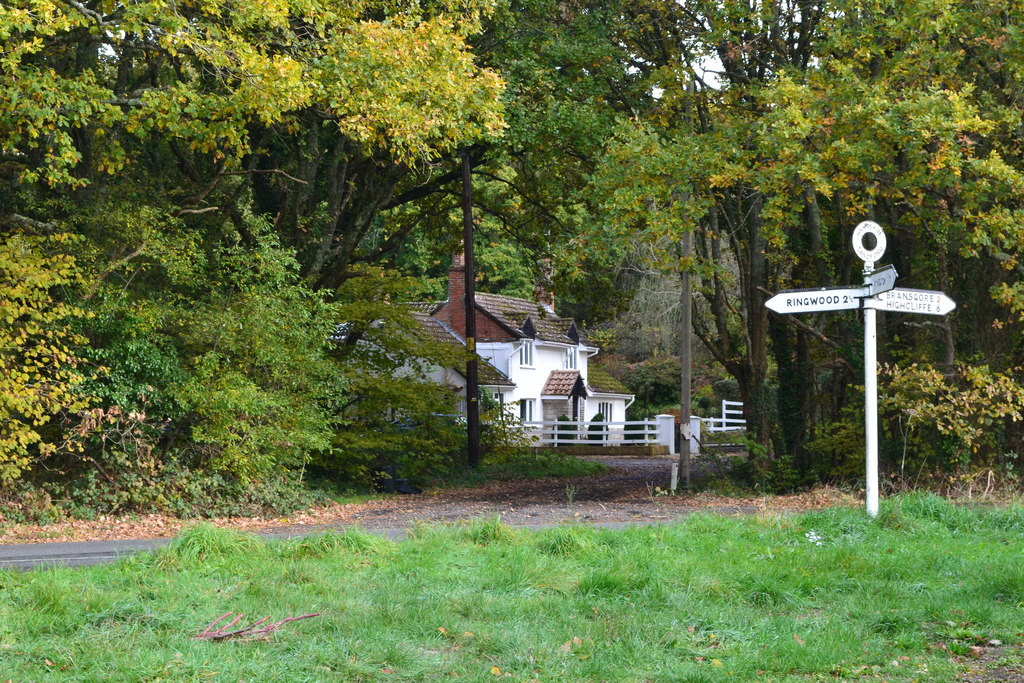
- Road junction at Sandford

- Location within Hampshire
- OS grid reference: SU1645301899
- District: New Forest
- Shire county: Hampshire
- Region: South East
- Country: England
- Sovereign state: United Kingdom
- Post town: RINGWOOD
- Postcode district: BH24
- Dialling code: 01590
- Police: Hampshire and Isle of Wight
- Fire: Hampshire and Isle of Wight
- Ambulance: South Central
- UK Parliament: New Forest West

Sandford is a small hamlet in the New Forest National Park of Hampshire, England. The nearest town to Sandford is Ringwood, which is approximately 2.6 miles (4.2 km) north from the hamlet.
