= Regency House =

House in Framlingham, Suffolk, England

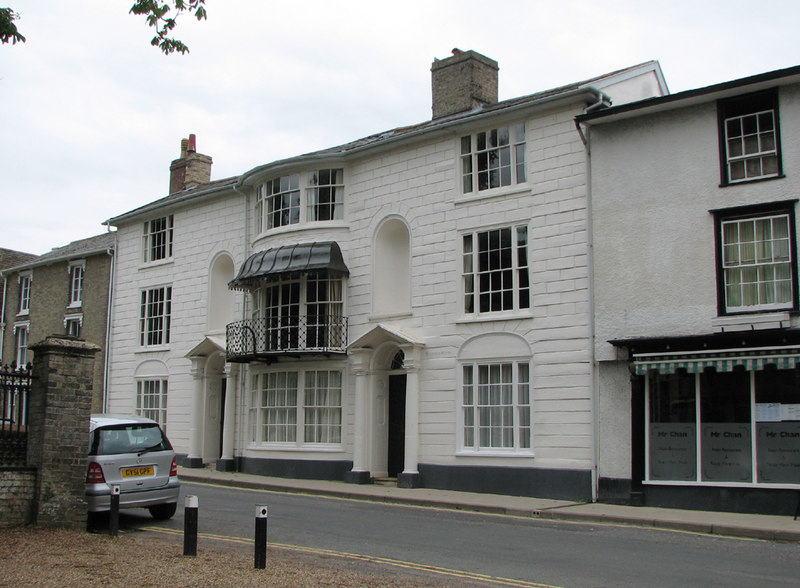
- Regency House
- Interactive map of the Regency House area

General information
- Status: Grade II* listed
- Type: House; shop
- Architectural style: Timber-framed
- Location: 7 Church Street, Framlingham, Suffolk, England
- Coordinates: 52°13′20″N 1°20′43″E
- Opened: Early 19th century

Technical details
- Floor count: 3

Regency House is a grade II* listed house at 7 Church Street in Framlingham, Suffolk, England. The house is timber-framed, of three storeys, and dates from the early nineteenth century. It is in use as a shop and house.
