= Farnham, Suffolk =

Village in Suffolk, England

Coordinates: 52.188°N 1.455°E

Farnham
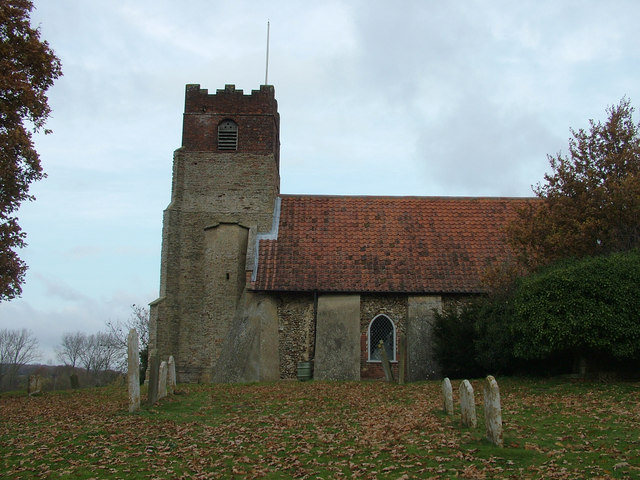
- St. Mary's Church, Farnham

- Location within Suffolk
- Population: 118 (2011)
- OS grid reference: TM3660
- Civil parish: Farnham
- Shire county: Suffolk
- Region: East
- Country: England
- Sovereign state: United Kingdom
- Post town: Saxmundham
- Postcode district: IP17

Farnham is a village and civil parish about 3 miles (4.8 km) south-west of Saxmundham in the English county of Suffolk on the A12 road. Farnham is located west of Friday Street, south of Benhall Low Street and north-east of Stratford St Andrew.

== History ==
The village of Farnham gets its name from Old English where it means "Fern hemmed-in land" or "Fern homestead/village". The earliest known recording of the village of Farnham is from the Domesday Book, written in 1086, where it appears three times. Farnham was located in the Hundred of Plomesgate in the County of Suffolk and had a population of 18 households; 8 smallholders and 13 free men. Farnham also had one Lord's plough teams and 2 men's plough teams. In addition to this the Domesday Book also had 2 mills and 21 acres of meadow recorded St. Mary's Church was not recorded in the Domesday Book.

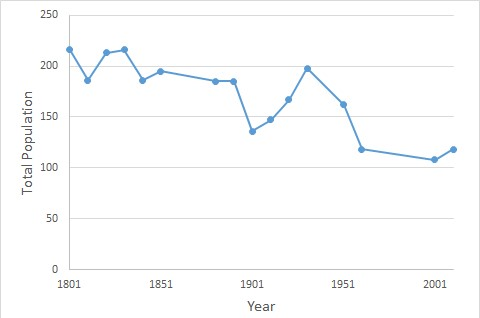
Farnham time series of population from 1801 to 2011.

In 1870–72 John Marius Wilson described Farnham, in John Marius Wilson's Imperial Gazetteer of England and Wales, as:

"A parish in Plomesgate district, Suffolk; near the river Alde and the East Suffolk railway. It has a post office under Wickham Market. The living is a vicarage in the diocese of Norwich. The church is Norman, with a flint tower, and very good."

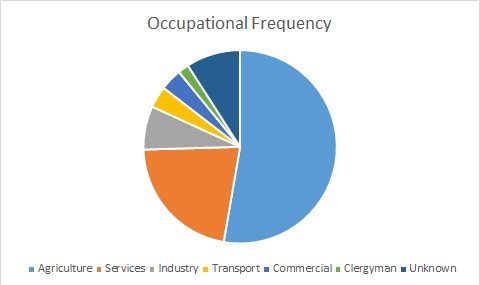
Job types and their frequency in Farnham in 1881

In this he also described the village as having a population of 184 and 46 houses, with property costing around £1,521. He also said the village had an acreage of 1,177.

Census data for Farnham goes back to 1801 with the population in this year being 216, by the 1811 census this number had fallen to 186, the next census in 1821 saw an increase in population up to 213. The population then peaked in 1831 with the population once again reaching 216. From here the population began to fall with the population in 1961 being 118. This number remained fairly consistent with the population in 2001 being 108 and then in 2011 it rose back up to 118; 57 males and 61 females. It has also been recorded that as of 1 December 2016 there were 99 electors on Farnham's electoral register.

The number of houses in Farnham is also something that has risen over time. The earliest known recording of the number of houses in Farnham is from the 1831 census when the number of houses was 35. This number steadily increased when in 1881 the number of houses reached 48. In 1891 the number of houses fell to 45, however thirty years later, in 1921, the number of houses reached it lowest number – 40 houses. This number once again rose and reached 46 in 1931 and remained this way until 1961 when the number of houses fell once again to 41. More recently in 2001 it was recorded that there were 47 houses. In 2011 this number had once again risen to 53 houses. This has since decreased to 50 houses in 2016. The average house price in Farnham is around £231,044.

Out of the 2011 population, 63 persons (aged between 18 and 74) were employed. Of these 63, 10 were employed in construction, 8 in human health and social work activities, 6 in agriculture and 6 in public administration and defence; compulsory social security. This is a stark contrast to employment in 1831 where the most popular industry was agriculture with 29 persons employed, the services industry was also a significant employer with 8 persons employed. In 1881 over half of the working population were employed in agriculture, and just under a quarter in services (this includes carpenters, bricklayers and person working in textiles). From 1881 to 2011 there has been a big industrial shift with the number employed in agriculture falling (fall of 23 persons); this is likely because in 1881 agricultural activities required people to carry them out whereas in 2011 fewer people are required as technology has advanced. However one job sector that hasn't undergone technological advance is the construction industry as this has seen a large increase with only 3 people in this industry in 1881 to 10 in 2011 (the biggest industry in 2011) a rise of 7 persons.

== St. Mary's Church ==
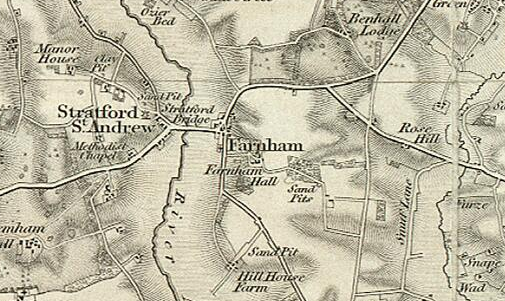
Map of Farnham dating back to 1837

St. Mary's Church is located just South of the village and has a long history dating back to the Norman times.

Before the church was constructed there was a Roman encampment constructed here due to its positioning at the top of a hill offering vantage points across the surrounding area.

It is thought that the original church building was built around AD800 but was kept hidden due to the nearby environment at the time. It was not recorded in the Domesday Book.

The building that is currently there is built of mostly flint and stone and was built in the Norman time, with most of the interior being the original interior. There are some more recent instalments such as the organ which was installed in 2000. Two bells hang in the tower for swing chiming both weigh around 4cwt having been cast by the Brend family of Norwich, one in 1590, the other larger bell tuned to D in 1631.

More recently in 1992, after the redundancy of St Andrew's church in Stratford St Andrew, both Farnham and Stratford St Andrew's churches united with both parishes now using St. Mary's Church. St Andrew's Church has been converted into a house.

== Present Day ==
In 2011 the national census recorded the population in Farnham at 118. Employment in Farnham in 2011 was moderately high with 32.6% of the population in full-time employment, 10.5% part-time and 23.2% were self-employed; this equates to 66.3% of the population of Farnham in employment. On the other hand, despite the relatively high unemployment rates at the time of the 2011 census (7.7% nationally) unemployment in Farnham was measured at 0.0%. Meaning the rest of the population in Farnham were either too young to work or have retired.

The village of Farnham itself has very limited employment opportunities. There are two main employers in Farnham – Farnham Industrial Estate and Farnham Leisure. Farnham Industrial Estate is home to up to five separate units all housing different businesses including a renewable energy firm and a car workshop. Farnham Industrial Estate is likely to make up for a large amount of 23.2% of self-employed people. Farnham Leisure specialises in the sale of caravans both new and used; it also contains a workshop for caravans. As of 21 March 2017 it employs 11 people (9 men, 2 women), a considerable amount given the population size of Farnham.

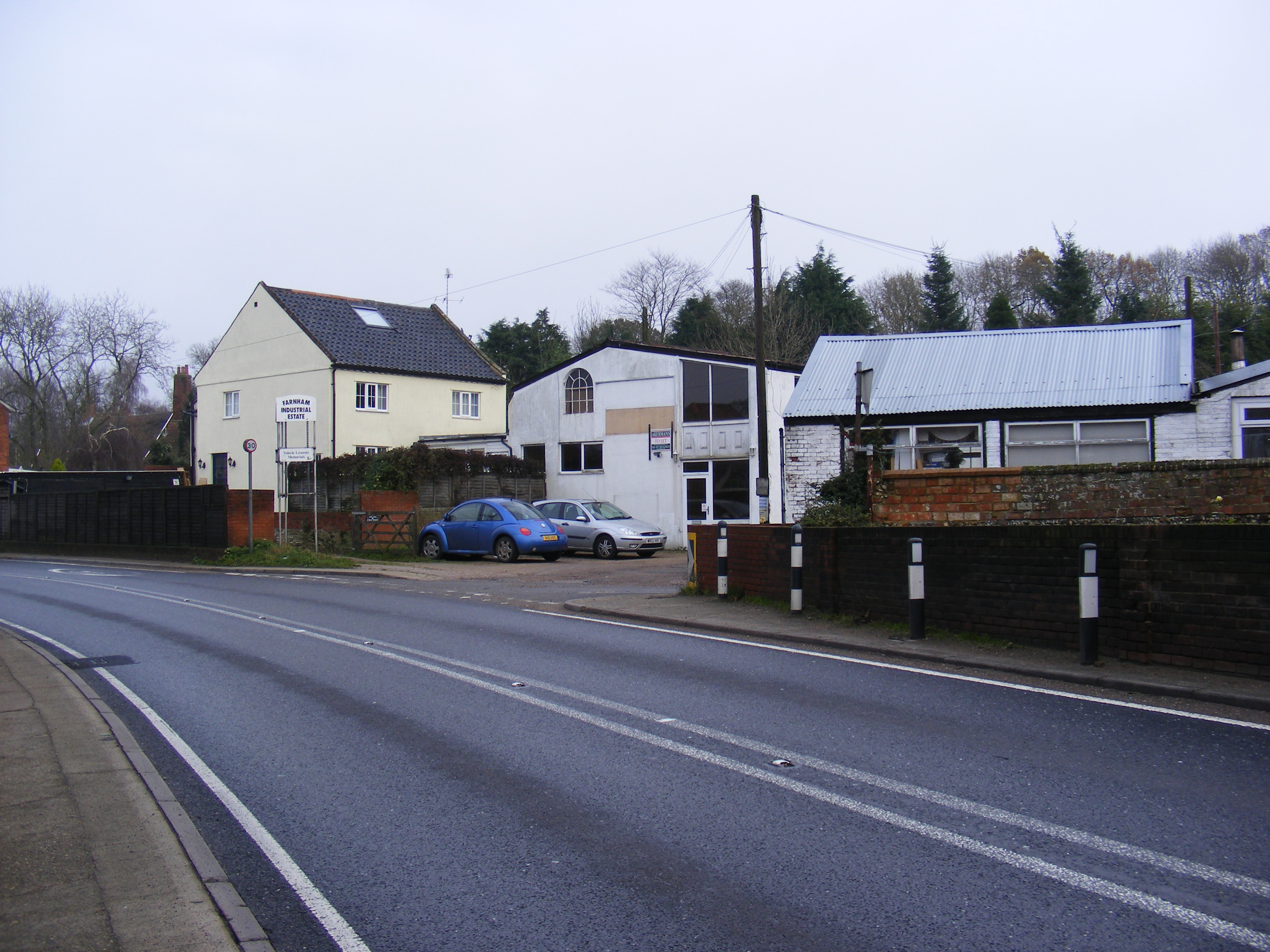
Farnham Industrial Estate

Public transport in Farnham is also scarce. The closest railway stations are Saxmundham railway station, which is located three miles to the north east of Farnham, and Wickham Market railway station, five miles to the south west (in Campsea Ashe). Both stops are served by regular trains running on the East Suffolk line between Ipswich and Lowestoft. In the village there is one bus stop, served by the First Norfolk & Suffolk company, which provides a regular bus service to the village on a two-hourly basis. This route starts/terminates in Ipswich and Aldeburgh. The village is also served by two other bus services run by Coastal Accessible Transport. The village also has the de-trunked A12 road running through it, which official statistics show to be relatively safe at this point. However, a sharp corner at the centre of the village and overall traffic volumes - particularly of heavy goods vehicles (HGVs) - have historically been a concern for local campaigners calling for Farnham to be bypassed. Despite a 'four-village bypass' scheme being given the go-ahead in the 1990s, a change of government priorities saw this project withdrawn and subsequent attempts to re-visit similar ideas have failed through lack of financial support.

In addition to the aforementioned St. Mary's Church (Grade II* listed), Farnham is also home to nine other listed buildings; all of which are Grade II listed. These are Farnham Manor (formerly known as Farnham Hall), Rose Hill House, Elm Tree Farmhouse and Elm Tree Cottage, Turret Cottage, Turret House and Hill Farmhouse. There are two more significant listed buildings within Farnham: The old George & Dragon pub and the old Post Office Stores. The Old George and Dragon is located directly on the A12 as it passes through Farnham (at which point it is called The Street) and acquired its Grade II status in 1983. This building used to be a public house for the area, but heard 'last orders' called for the final time in 1996. The building has since been converted into a residential property. The old Post Office Stores is also located on The Street and also gained its Grade II status in 1983. This building was of much importance to the village of Farnham and the neighbouring Stratford St. Andrew, as letters that were sent to both villages from Wickham Market were left at Farnham Post Office. The building is now used as a residential property and was last put up for sale with a guide price of £275,000.

The village of Farnham is located in the electoral region of Wilford, which in turn falls into the East Suffolk district. Currently Wilford is under Conservative rule with Andrew Reid representing Wilford at Suffolk County Council. Farnham with Stratford St. Andrew Parish Council represents these two parishes collectively.
