= Saval =

Coordinates: 58.04014°N 4.39436°W

Saval: Scottish Gaelic: Sàbhal
- Location within the Sutherland area
- OS grid reference: NC587081
- Council area: Highland
- Lieutenancy area: Sutherland
- Country: Scotland
- Sovereign state: United Kingdom
- Post town: Lairg
- Postcode district: IV27 4
- Police: Scotland
- Fire: Scottish
- Ambulance: Scottish

Saval (Scottish Gaelic: Sàbhal) is a small remote hamlet, surrounded by Dalchork Wood, 1.5 miles northeast of the village of Lairg, in Sutherland, Scottish Highlands and is in the Scottish council area of Highland.
