= Sandylake =

Village in United Kingdom

Coordinates: 50.414369°N 4.640464°W

Sandylake is a hamlet east of Lostwithiel in Cornwall, England. It is on the A30 main road.
