= Sir Robert Hitcham's Almshouses =

Almshouse in Suffolk, England

Coordinates: 52°13′21″N 1°20′26″E

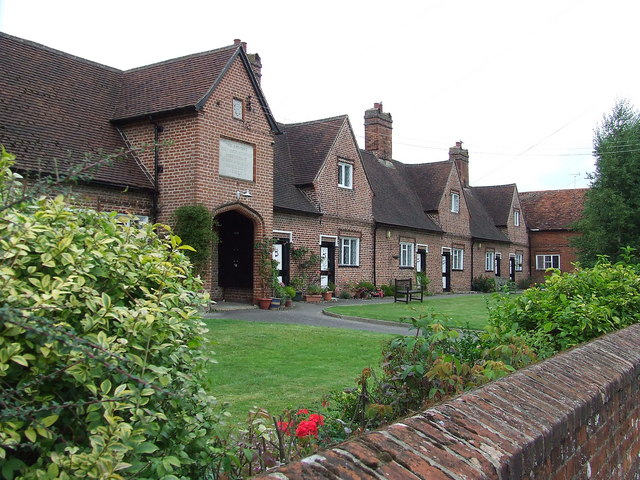
Sir Robert Hitchams Almshouses

Sir Robert Hitcham's Almshouses are grade II* listed almshouses in New Road, Framlingham, Suffolk, England.

They were built in 1654 under the will of Sir Robert Hitcham using materials from the demolished buildings of Framlingham Castle.
