= Sand, Highland =

Coordinates: 57.8625°N 5.5287°W

Sand: Scottish Gaelic: Sannda
- Location within the Ross and Cromarty area
- OS grid reference: NG893896
- Council area: Highland
- Country: Scotland
- Sovereign state: United Kingdom
- Post town: Achnasheen
- Postcode district: IV22 2
- Police: Scotland
- Fire: Scottish
- Ambulance: Scottish

Sand (Scottish Gaelic: Sannda) is a small hamlet, located on the southern shore of Gruinard Bay, and lying to the west of the village of Laide in Ross and Cromarty, Scottish Highlands and is in the Scottish council area of Highland.
