= The Ancient House, Peasenhall =

Grade II* listed house in Suffolk, England

Coordinates: 52°16′17″N 1°27′06″E

The Ancient House

The Ancient House is a Grade II* listed house in Peasenhall, Suffolk, England. The house is timber-framed and dates from the mid-sixteenth century with an eighteenth-century facade. It was extensively altered in the late nineteenth century. It was in the ownership of the furniture expert R. W. Symonds at his death in 1958.
