= Deben Mill =

Mill in Wickham Market, Suffolk, England

Coordinates: 52°09′34″N 1°22′15″E

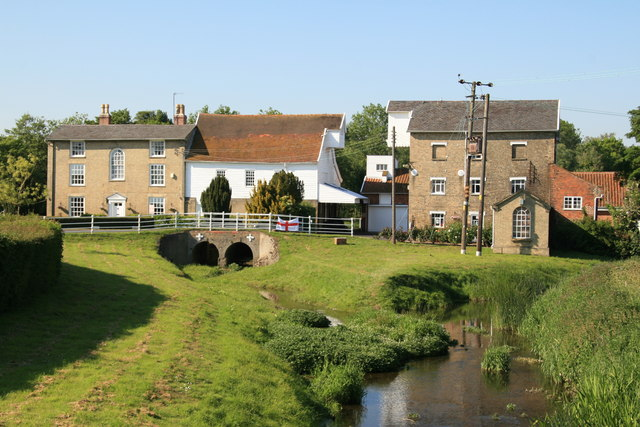
Deben Mill in June 2006

Culvert under Deben Mill

Deben Mill is a watermill on the River Deben located on the boundary between the civil parishes of Wickham Market and Hacheston, in Suffolk, England. It has been a Grade II* listed building since 16 March 1966. The watermill's machinery is complete and in working order.

The earliest record of the mill dates from 1701.

In 1893 mill owner Reuben Rackham purchased a Whitmore and Binyon horizontal condensing steam engine, at a cost of £25,000, to drive the mill. The engine provided constant regulated power to the milling machinery, controlled by the patent Nordberg governor on top of the cylinder, with a fly-wheel belt drive. The engine was installed in July 1893 and the entire plant was operational by October of the same year. The engine was last worked in 1957 and was subsequently moved to the Museum of East Anglian Life (now The Food Museum), in Stowmarket as a gift of Edward and Robert Rackham, Rueben Rackham's sons. The engine is displayed at the museum, is still operational and is occasionally run.
