= White Hart Inn, Blythburgh =

Pub in Blythburgh, Suffolk, England

Coordinates: 52°19′18″N 1°35′54″E

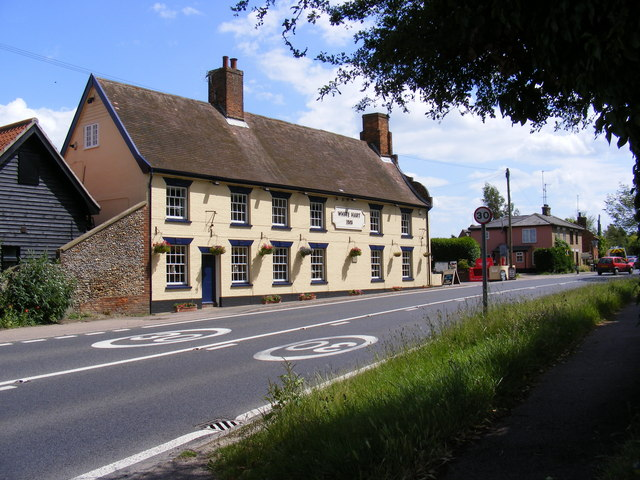
The White Hart Inn

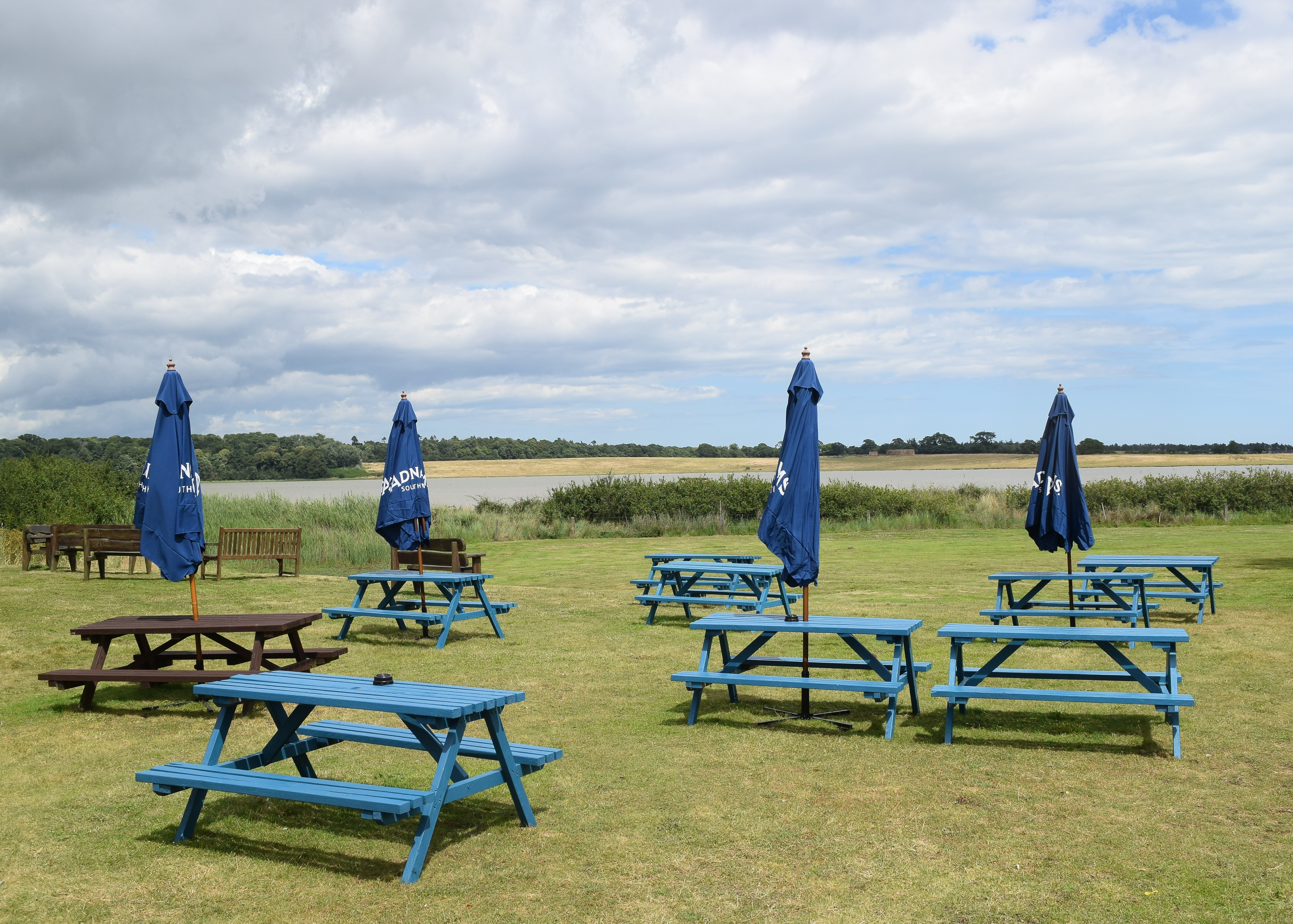
View from beer garden

The White Hart Inn is a grade II* listed public house in Blythburgh, Suffolk, England. It is a timber-framed former coaching inn and courthouse that dates from the mid-sixteenth century with later alterations.
