= Sapey Common =

Coordinates: 52.273°N 2.439°W

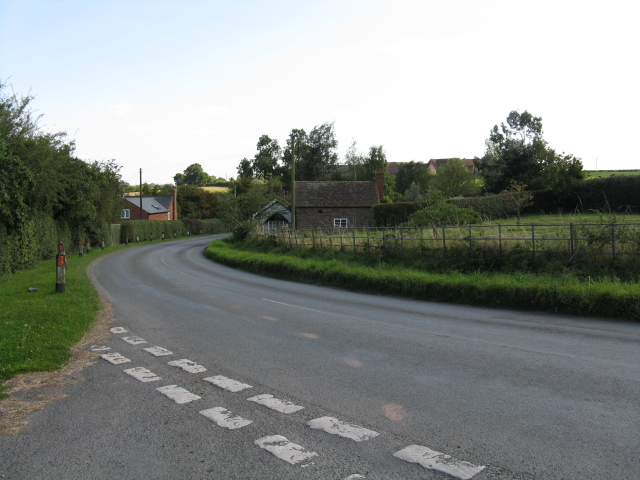
- Sapey Common, looking south

- Location within Herefordshire
- Unitary authority: Herefordshire
- Shire county: Herefordshire
- Region: West Midlands
- Country: England
- Sovereign state: United Kingdom
- Post town: Worcester
- Postcode district: WR6
- Police: West Mercia
- Fire: Hereford and Worcester
- Ambulance: West Midlands
- UK Parliament: North Herefordshire

Sapey Common is a hamlet in Herefordshire, England, near the border with Worcestershire, 10 km (6.2 mi) north east of Bromyard.

Although the area is in Herefordshire, the post town is Worcester and the postcode WR6.

Recently introduced to the area were the newly built 'Manors of Shelsley' which, although claimed to be in the heart of the Teme Valley, are in fact in Sapey Common - which overlooks the heart of the Teme Valley.

The area is home to three-five local farms and is a neighbourhood watch area. There is a farm tractor dealership in the village.
