= Buxlow Manor =

Manor house in Knodishall, Suffolk, England

Coordinates: 52°12′52″N 1°31′39″E

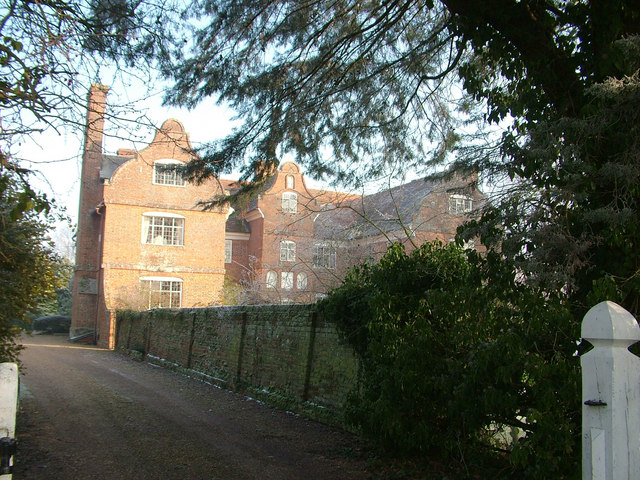
Buxlow Manor

Buxlow Manor is a grade II* listed house in Knodishall, Suffolk, England. It is built of red brick and has been dated to 1678 from the markings on the iron ties in the main gables. It has also been known as Ghost House, Ghost Hole, and Red House Farm. The land and former house were once owned by John Cordebouef who died in 1300.
