= Stratford St Andrew =

Village in Suffolk, England

Coordinates: 52.199°N 1.447°E

- Location within Suffolk
- Population: 185 (2011)
- OS grid reference: TM357602
- District: East Suffolk
- Shire county: Suffolk
- Region: East
- Country: England
- Sovereign state: United Kingdom
- Post town: Saxmundham
- Postcode district: IP17
- UK Parliament: Suffolk Coastal

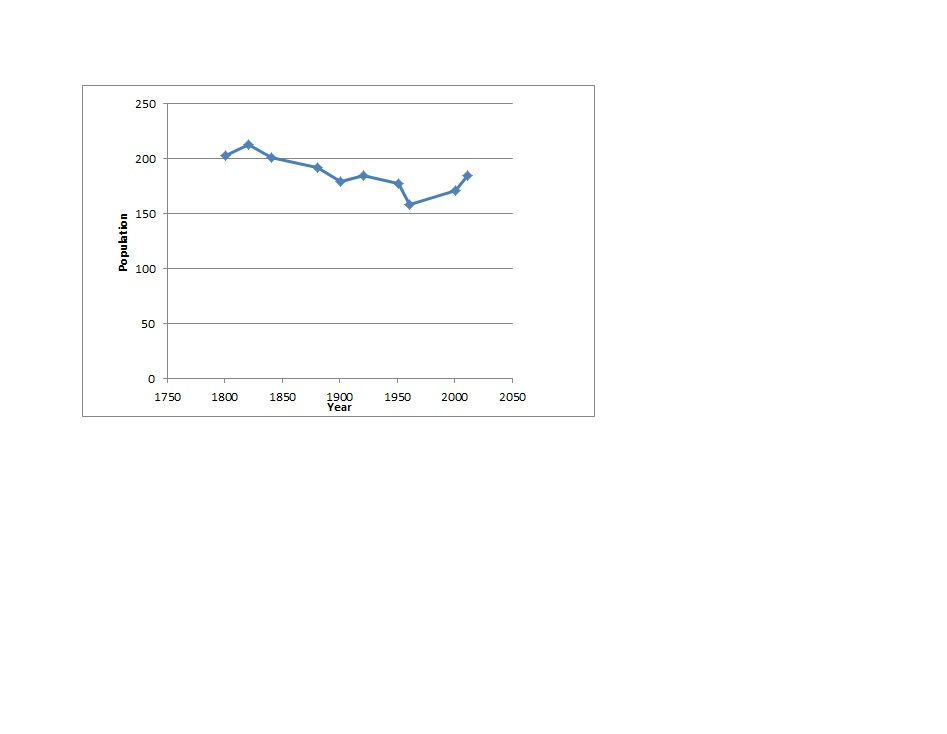
Total population of Stratford St Andrew, Suffolk, as reported by the Census of Population from 1801 to 2011

Stratford St Andrew is a small village and a civil parish just off the A12 road, in the East Suffolk district, in the English county of Suffolk. It lies 3 miles south west of Saxmundham, the nearest town.

The parish had a population of 185 at the 2011 census.

== History ==
Stratford St Andrew has the origins of its name traced back to a combination of Anglican and Old English. It translates as, 'Ford on a Roman road', with this being a later affix from the church dedication.

In the Domesday book of 1086, Stratford St Andrew was situated in the Plomesgate district, under the ownership of Walter Giffard, who was recorded as the Tenant-in-chief. The value of the land to the Lord, Ralph of Lanquetot, was said to be £2.4. The village was recorded as having 25 households, containing 5 smallholders and 13.5 free men. The Domesday records also state that there was a 4-acre meadow, along with a single mill. In terms of livestock it is reported that there were 2 cattle, 15 pigs, 30 sheep and 27 goats in 1086.

Stratford St Andrew was given its name because Suffolk has two Stratfords. The other Stratford, titled Stratford St Mary, is located 30 miles down the A12 and is of no direct relation. In the 1870s, Stratford St Andrew was described as:

"a parish in Plomesgate district, Suffolk; 3 miles SW of Saxmundham r. station.Real property, £1,373. Pop., 181. Houses, 43. The manor belongs to Earl Guilford."

The current (1990) Lord of Stratford St. Andrew is the Hon. Douglas Densmore, CSt.J. and Knight Officer of the Order of Saints Maurice and Lazarus. Up until the early 21st century, the village had a church, this church representing the Church of England faith. However, in 1992, the church was declared redundant. The church was first noted as being run down in the 1970s, when it was described as:

"dully Victorian, a middle-brow lukewarm ritualist restoration from the 1870s."

It was also described as having smashed windows, rusty hooks and an old open chest simply abandoned on the floor. The vestry door was said to be hanging off on its hinges.

The church had been founded in 1692 and was dedicated to St. Andrew. Ranulph do Glanville, the famous justiciary of England during the reign of Henry II, was born in Stratford St Andrew.

The village sign for Stratford St Andrew shows the mill, of which little now remains. Whilst the black swan, which can be seen on the sign, is a reminder of a coaching inn, named the 'Black Swan'. This inn no longer exists. The coat of arms for the village reads:

"confide recte agens."

This translates as 'doing rightly, be confident.'

== Demographics ==
Since 1801, the total population of Stratford St Andrew has gradually declined from 203, to 185 in 2011. 1821 saw the village reach its peak total population with 213 inhabitants. In contrast, 1961 saw the lowest total population for the village, with 158 recorded inhabitants. Despite the decline in total population, the number of houses in the village has increased. In 1831, when the total population was 200, the number of houses was recorded as 24. By 1961, there were 58 households, even though the total population was at its recorded lowest, 158. The most recent census data in 2011, reports that there are now 78 households in the village, 43% of which are owned outright. The reasoning behind the increase in households may be partially explained by the increase in area of Stratford St Andrew. In 1831 the total area was 300 acres, however 60 years later in 1891, the village was 800 acres large. This increase in land would allow more room for houses to be built, thus partially explaining why there is an increase in the recorded number of households.

In 1831, working in agricultural labour was the largest sector of employment for those living in Stratford St Andrew. There were only 5 employers and professionals. In 2011 there were 95 people from the village in employment. Of those 95, only four were involved in agricultural labour. The majority are now involved in retail related work, as well as education.

== Amenities ==
Stratford St Andrew formerly had a place of worship, but today the church has been converted into a private residence. It retains its structural presence, made up of a tall plain tower, with simple decorated bell windows. Today, the nearest operating church to the village is located less than half a mile to the east in Farnham, just over the River Alde. The church is named St Mary's Church and has been in existence since 12th century Norman. Stratford St Andrew also has a village hall named the 'Riverside Centre'. Within the boundaries of Stratford St Andrew and just off the main A12 road is a garage. This garage contains a Shell petrol station.

== Village Hall ==
Stratford St Andrew contains a village hall. It was originally known as the 'Hut', and was built shortly after the First World War for the use of ex-servicemen.

However, by 1995, the 'Hut' was becoming run-down and reaching the end of its lifetime. So in November that year, the newly elected committee began raising funds for a new hall. In April 1998 the National Lottery Fund awarded a grant of £185,000 towards the project. Together with support from Suffolk Coastal District, Waste Recycling Environmental Limited, Rural Development Council and Carnegie Trust, construction of the new hall was able to commence on 1 June 1998.

In February 1999 building of the new hall was completed. It had taken less than a year to construct, largely due to help from over 120 volunteers. The official opening was 4 March 1999, where it was opened by Lord Belstead, and was named the 'Riverside Centre'.

The hall comprises a store room, members lounge and games room. Outside there is a floodlit patio and play area, as well as a basketball area. The centre offers Pilates and Tango classes, hosts Ladies' and Men's darts, and is available for bookings.
