= Peasenhall =

Village in Suffolk, England

Coordinates: 52°16′N 1°27′E

- St Michael's Church

- Location within Suffolk
- Population: 525 (2021)
- Civil parish: Peasenhall
- District: East Suffolk
- Shire county: Suffolk
- Region: East
- Country: England
- Sovereign state: United Kingdom
- Post town: Saxmundham
- Postcode district: IP17
- UK Parliament: Suffolk Coastal

Peasenhall is a village and civil parish in the East Suffolk district, in the English county of Suffolk. The population of the civil parish at the 2021 Census was 525. It lies on the A1120 tourist route; neighbouring villages include Sibton and Badingham. It was the location of the unsolved 1902 murder of Rose Harsent.

== Governance ==
Peasenhall has its own parish council comprising 10 councillors, elected every four years. At district level, Peasenhall forms part of the Kelsale & Yoxford ward of East Suffolk district, and at county level, Peasenhall is included in the Framlingham Division of Suffolk County Council.

== Amenities ==
The parish church of St Michael's dates from the 15th century, although much restored in 1860. It is a Grade II* listed building. There is also a Methodist chapel; the building dates from 1809. There was also formerly a Congregationalist chapel.

Apart from the church, buildings of architectural interest include the 'Ancient House', the New Inn, a Landmark Trust property, and the remains of a post mill. Much of the village is included in the Peasenhall & Sibton Conservation Area

Shops in Peasenhall include the Peasenhall General Store, a delicatessen (Emmett's, established in 1820), an interior design shop, an upholsterers, and Whincops Garage. There are two tearooms; Weavers, and another at Emmett's. There were formerly a number of public houses in the village, including the Swan Inn, the Angel and the Feathers Inn, all now converted to private dwellings or commercial premises.

The former annual event the Peasenhall Pea Festival was last held in 2014.

== Panorama ==
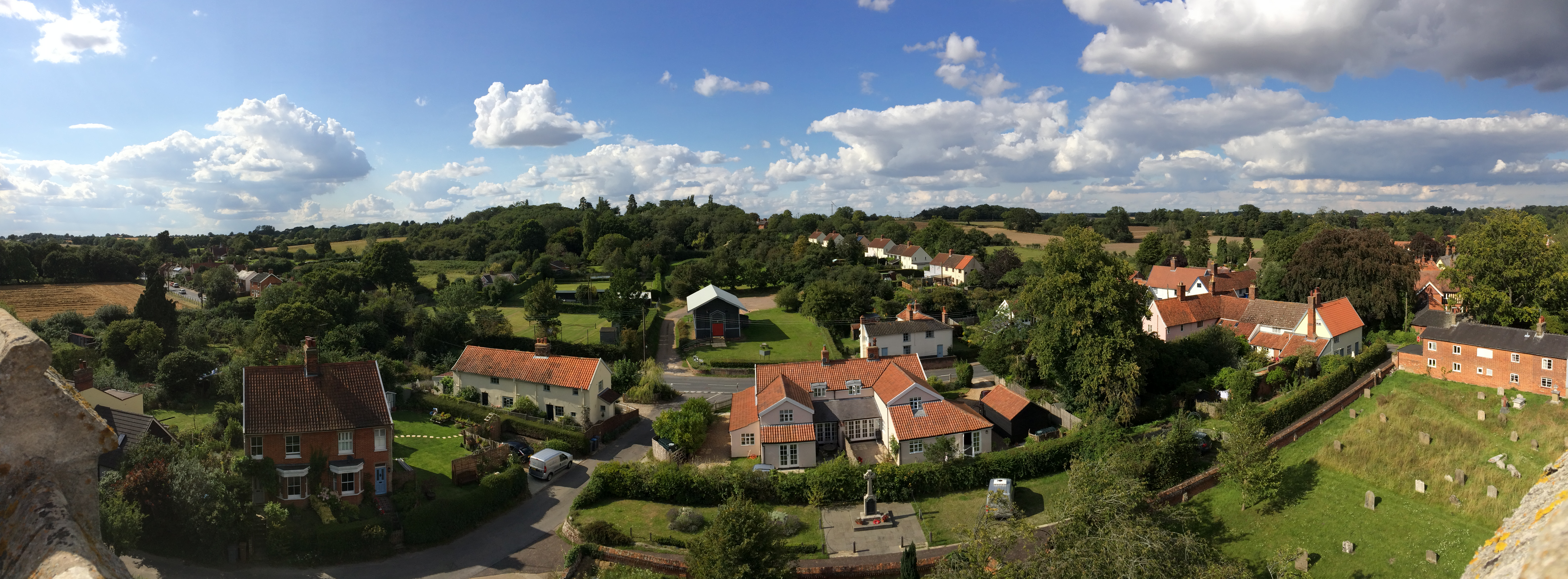
Panorama of the village of Peasenhall showing the Peasenhall & Sibton Tennis Club courts, Peasenhall Assembly Hall and a section of the St Michael's Church graveyard.

== Peacocks ==
Peasenhall is well known for its prides of peacocks which roam the village throughout the year, joined by numerous chicks from June onwards.

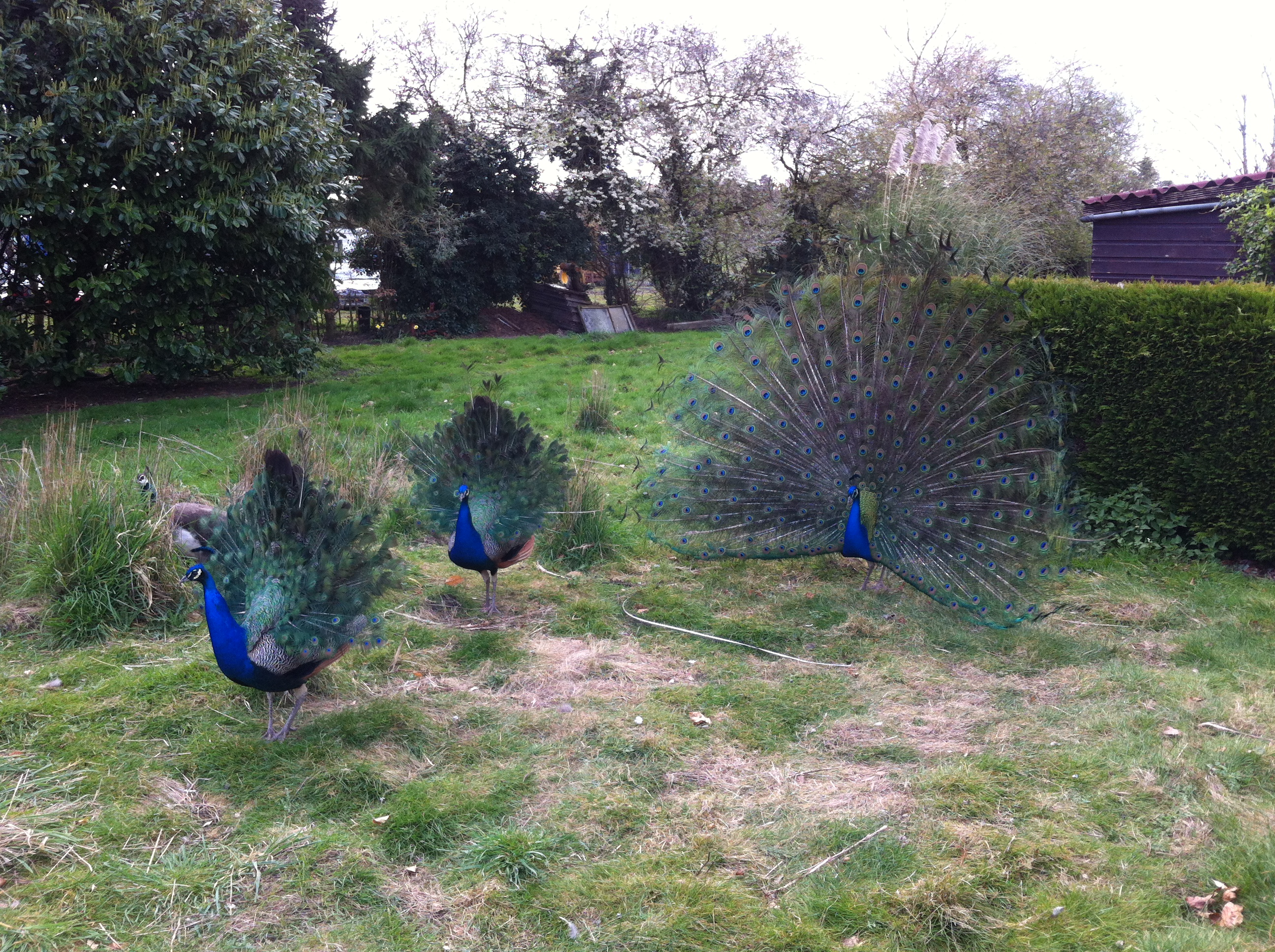
Three peacocks with full plumage in Peasenhall.
