= Saxtead Green Windmill =

Windmill in Saxtead Green, Suffolk, England

Saxtead Green Post Mill
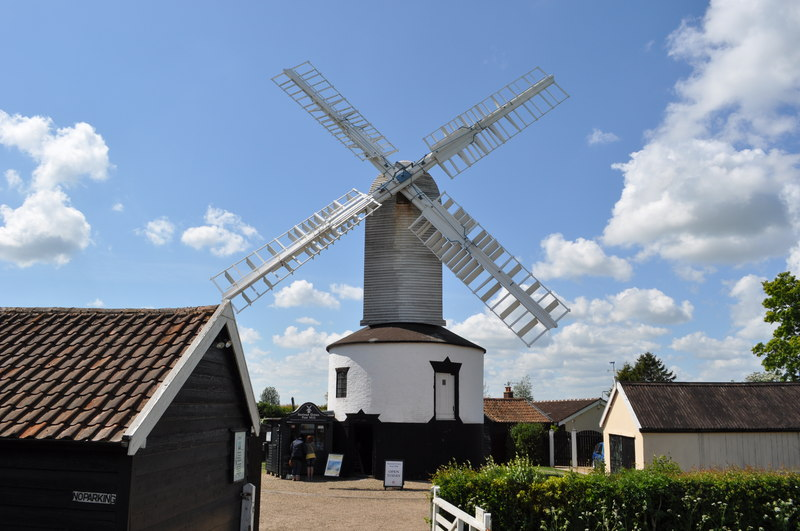
- Saxtead Green Post Mill

Origin
- Mill name: Saxtead Green Post Mill
- Grid reference: TM 253 644
- Coordinates: 52.2318°N 1.2984°E
- Operator(s): English Heritage
- Year built: Late 18th century

Information
- Purpose: Corn mill
- Type: Post mill
- Storeys: Three storey buck
- Roundhouse storeys: Three storey roundhouse
- No. of sails: Four sails
- Type of sails: Patent sails
- Windshaft: Cast iron
- Winding: Fantail
- Fantail blades: Six blades
- No. of pairs of millstones: Two pairs

Saxtead Green Post Windmill is a Grade II* listed post mill at Saxtead Green, Woodbridge, Suffolk, England which is also a Scheduled monument and has been restored.

== History ==
According to the Manorial Records there has been a windmill in Saxtead since 1287. The current Saxtead Green Mill dates back to at least 1796 when the miller was Amos Webber. In 1810, the Mill House was built for Robert Holmes. The mill was raised a total of three times during its working life. The mill was tailwinded c. 1853. Around this time, the sails were destroyed and remade but in 1854 Whitmore and Binyon, the Wickham Market millwrights fitted new cast iron machinery and windshaft, and the layout of the machinery changed from Head and Tail to Breast stones. It was in this year that the mill was raised for the third time. Collins, the Melton millwright worked on the mill in the 1870s and Whitmore and Binyon again worked on the mill in the 1890s. From 1926 millwright Jesse Wightman (who was initially apprenticed to A S Aldred the Miller) assisted the owner with repairs until the mill ceased working commercially on the death of the last miller in 1947.

The mill passed to Mr Steven Charles Sullivan,(1908–1997) the son-in-law of A S Aldred, who placed the mill in the guardianship of the Ministry of Works in 1951. The mill is currently owned by Stephen and Jonathan Sullivan (ensuring the Mill has been in the ownership of the same family since 1873) The mill was completely rebuilt between 1957 and 1960 under the supervision of Jesse Wightman. A replacement crowntree was obtained from a windmill at Wetheringsett which had been demolished. The mill has been in the care of English Heritage since 1984

The mill was repaired, with a new pair of sails made in 2008.

In 2017 the mill was closed by English Heritage who undertook a 250k restoration project of the mill. Local Millwright Tim Whiting was appointed to complete the works which involved building a new set of sails and replacing the fantail. The mill was due to reopen in April 2020 but due to the Coronavirus pandemic was delayed until 2021.

== Description ==
Saxtead Green Mill is a post mill with a three-storey roundhouse. The mill has four Patent sails carried on a cast-iron windshaft and is winded by a fantail. The mill has two pairs of millstones in the breast. All the machinery is of cast iron except the Brake Wheel, which is of oak.

== Millers ==
- Amos Webber 1796
- Robert Holmes 1810
- George Holmes
- George William Holmes
- Mr Meadows
- Mr Steggles
- Mr Rouse
- Frederick Eldred
- Alfred Aldred
- Alfred Stephenson Robert Aldred - 1947

Reference for the above -

== Public access ==
The mill is open to the public on Friday, Saturday and Bank Holidays between 1 April and 30 September each year.
