= Knodishall =

Village in Suffolk, England

Coordinates: 52.2°N 1.55°E

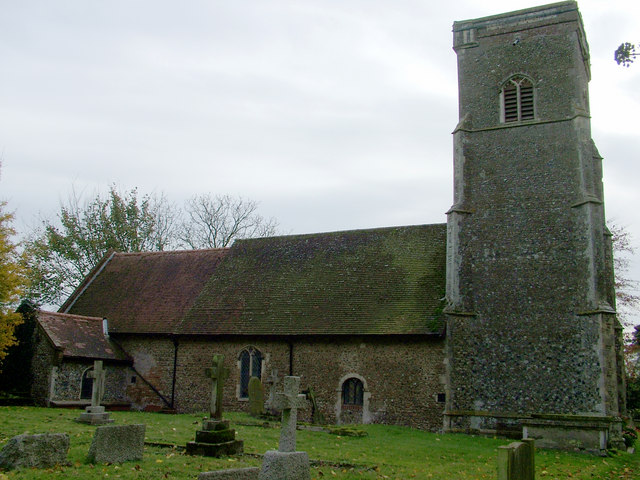
- Church of St. Lawrence, Knodishall

- Location within Suffolk
- Population: 852 2011 Census
- Civil parish: Knodishall
- District: East Suffolk
- Shire county: Suffolk
- Region: East
- Country: England
- Sovereign state: United Kingdom
- Post town: Saxmundham
- Postcode district: IP17
- UK Parliament: Suffolk Coastal

Knodishall, a village in Suffolk, England, lies 3.5 miles (6 km) south-east of Saxmundham, 1 mile (2 km) south-west of Leiston, and 3 miles from the coast, in the Blything Hundred. Most dwellings are now at Coldfair Green; just a few remain in the original village by the parish Church of St Lawrence, which falls gently on the north side of the Hundred River valley. It is now an outlier of Knodishall Common, a settlement a mile to the south-east. The estimated parish population was 790 in 2019.

== History ==
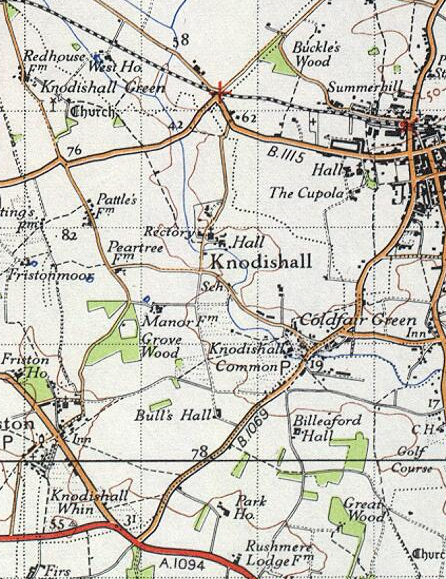
Map of Knodishall from the 20th Century

The name of Knodishall is an Old English formation referring to the healh, the bower or retreat of a person named Cnott. The Corpus of Romanesque Sculpture draws the following observations for Knodishall ("Cnotesheala", "Cnenotessala") from the Domesday Survey of 1086:

"Roger Bigod was the chief landholder here in 1086. Ranulf FitzWalter held 80 acres from him. Another 30 acres held by Roger Bigod had belonged before the Conquest to Edward the Confessor's free man, Boti. It had once been held by William Malet, while Robert Malet held the soke. An area of 80 acres in Knodishall formed an outlying estate or berewick of Bigod's manor in Saxmundham."

=== Manor of Knoddishall or Knottishall ===
The family of Jenney are supposed to take their name from Guisnes near Calais, France, and to have been seated soon after the Norman conquest at Haverland in Norfolk under the name of de Gisneto, de Gisne or Gyney. In the time of Richard II, Thomas son of Sir Thomas Gyney held the manor of Jenneys at Gislingham, Suffolk. A branch of the Jenney family became possessed of the manor of Knodishall by or before the fifteenth century and held it continuously from that time until it came to Edmund Jenney of Bredfield. This Edmund married Anne daughter of Philip Broke of Nacton in 1765, and sold the manor to Edward Vernon, who died in 1757. The old residence of the Jenney family at Knodishall, which was near the path leading from the church to Knodishall heath, burned down in around 1860, at which time the manor was held by the Mayhew family.

In the Taxatio Ecclesiastica of 1291, the Abbot of Leiston was assessed at four pounds fifteen shillings and fourpence three-farthing for rents on lands, meadows and villeins at Cnoteshale, and the Prior of Butley for lands and rents at one pound three shillings and a penny-halfpenny. They also had lands assessed at £1 and at 8s. (respectively) at Buckeslow (later absorbed into Knodishall). Leiston Abbey had holdings worth 102 shillings and fivepence-halfpenny in "Knotshall and Buxlow" in Henry VIII's valuation, and the farm of Russell's Close worth forty shillings, as well as the farm of the manor of Billesford (Billeaford), with the meadow-pasture and pasture belonging to it, worth £4.06s.08d. Rent of 22 pence was paid to Francis Jenney, Esq., at his manor of Knodyshall.

The former manor house of Buxlow Manor, now known as Red House Farm, is still standing in the parish.

=== Parish ===
The parish of Buxlow was consolidated with Knodishall on 22 February 1721. In 1865 it became part of Knodishall, which was then known as Knodishall-cum-Buxlow. During the 1870s it was noted:

"The parish contains also the village of Coldfair-Green, and the quondam parish of Buxlow; and is sometimes called Knodishall-cum-Buxlow. Acres 1,143. Real property, £3,173. Pop., 442. Houses, 100. The property is divided among a few. There are clay and sand pits. The living is a rectory, united with the chapelry of Buxlow, in the diocese of Norwich."

According to the 2011 Census there were then 418 males and 434 females living in the parish.

== Church ==
The rectory of Knodishall church is held as the benefice of Aldringham with Thorpe, Knodishall with Buxlow and Friston. The parish register begins in 1566.

The parish church, dedicated to the 3rd-century martyr St Lawrence, stands a mile west of the present-day settlement of Knodishall Common, on top of a hill. There is no recorded date of foundation. It belonged to the original Leiston Abbey at Eastbridge (founded 1182), when Robert, probably the first abbot, ceded it to the canons of Butley Priory in exchange for the churches of St Andrew at Aldringham and St Margaret at Leiston.

The fabric of the nave is of Norman date, though the only remaining feature of Romanesque carving is the north doorway, now partially blocked. The windows contain some later medieval stained glass. The 15th-century tower was built with a bequest from one John Jenney (lord of the manor, died 1460) and his wife, who have a monumental brass in the church. The tower has flint facings and was restored in the 19th century: it has one bell. A vestry was added in 1838. The church also has a burial ground. On 7 December 1966, the church became a Grade II* British listed building.

== Community ==
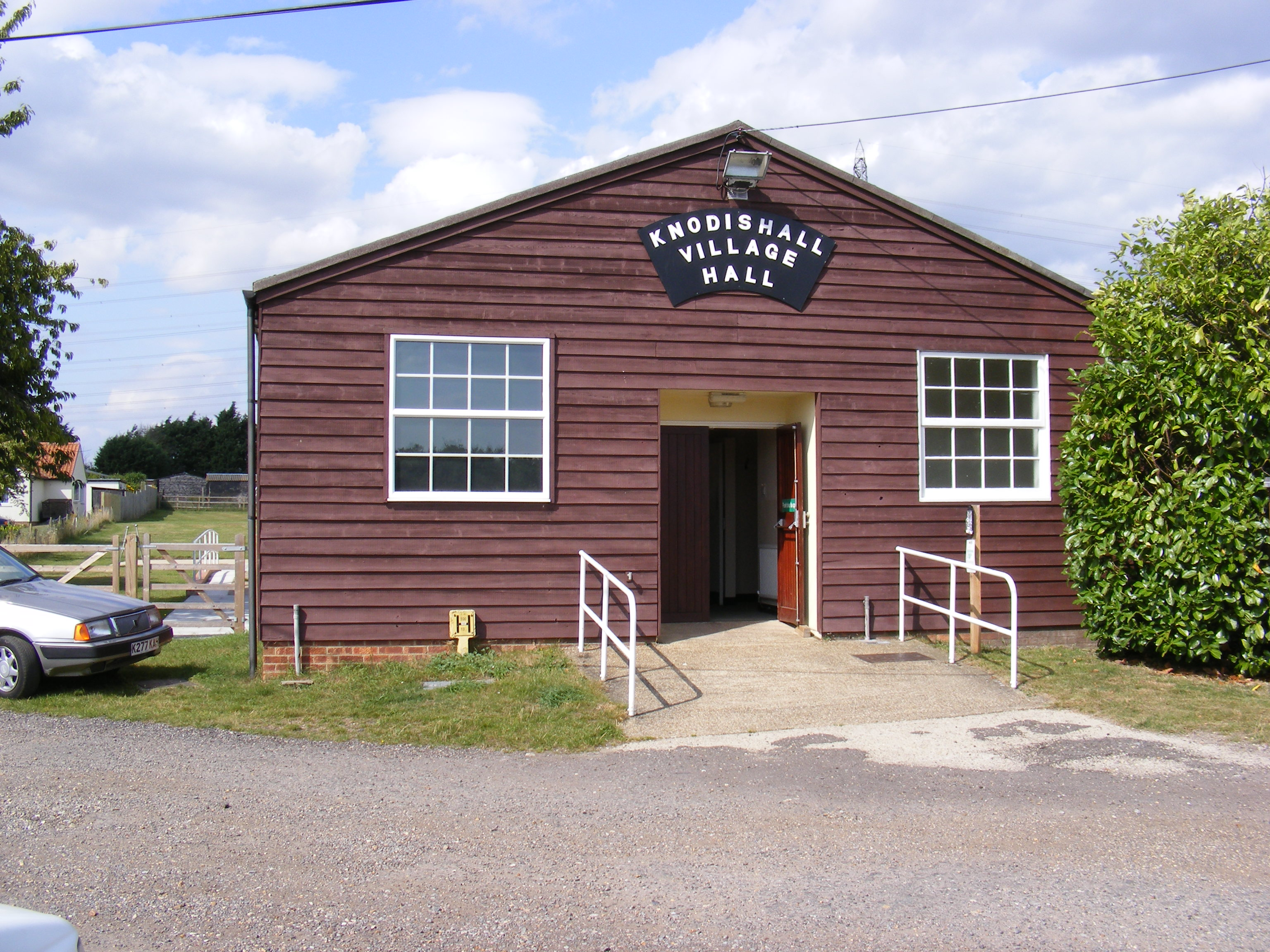
Knodishall Village Hall

The village is dispersed and close to both Leiston and Aldeburgh. It has a village shop, the Butchers Arms pub, a smallholding, a garage and Coldfair Green Primary School. The village expanded with the building of a small housing estate in the mid-1980s. There is also a local history group on Facebook, gathering information from the various families in the parish.

"Knodishall Local History Group is now [2017] in its fifth year. With the help of local people we have amassed a large digital collection of photos, audio recordings and documents relating to the village."

== Demographics ==
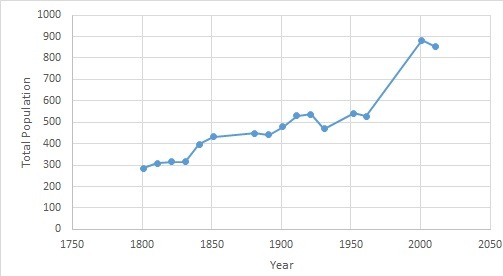
Knodishall population time series 1801–2011

=== Population trends ===
The total population of Knodishall from 1801 to 2011 has gradually increased. in 1801 the total population was just under 300 people and a slow increase until 1961 came to over 500 people. Then there was a much steeper increase between 1961 and 2001, of around 400 more people – we do not have any separate census data between 1961 and 2001. However in 1865, when the parish of Buxlow became part of Knodishall, there was no significant increase in total population to show this boundary change in the following census year.

=== Ethnicity ===
Of the 852 people living in Knodishall in 2008, 846 of them were white English, Welsh, Scottish, Northern Irish, British, or other. There was one person of mixed race white and black Caribbean. The area and surrounding areas are all predominantly white.

== Industry ==
In the 1880s, the main trades were agriculture and commodities. The employment was mainly male, as were most types of employment at that time. However, domestic services were almost wholly provided by women. as shown in the graph opposite. It is also clear that many females did not have jobs and simply kept their own households.

Chart showing the various occupations by gender in Knodishall in 1881

Industry	Males	Females	Total
Agriculture	7	2	9
Construction	39	5	44
Retail and repair of motor vehicles	32	20	52
Accommodation and Catering	13	22	35
Education	6	27	33
Human health and Social Work	8	35	43
Manufacturing	18	6	24

(The table shows the raw number of males and females aged 16 to 74 in employment in Knodishall from the 2011 census.)

Looking at the 2011 census, the main Knodishall occupations were retail trading, motor vehicle and motor cycle repairs, human health and social work, building construction and education, mostly still male dominated, but accommodation, catering, human health, social work and education were female dominated.

== See also ==
- Buxlow Manor
