= Saxtead =

Village in Suffolk, England

Coordinates: 52.24163°N 1.30914°E

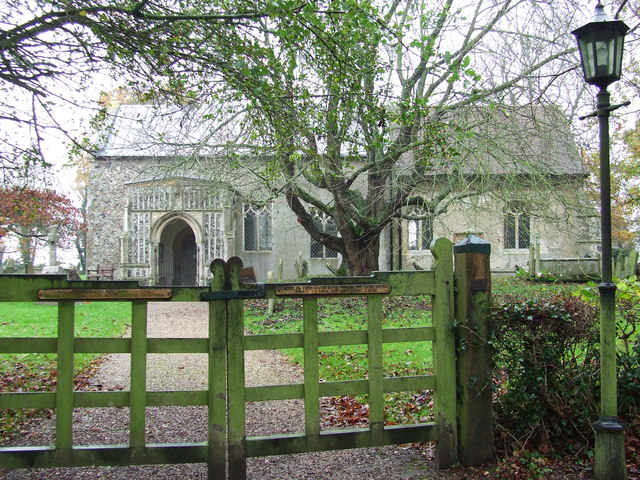
- Church of All Saints, Saxtead

- Location within Suffolk
- Population: 335 (2011 census)
- Civil parish: Saxtead
- District: East Suffolk
- Shire county: Suffolk
- Region: East
- Country: England
- Sovereign state: United Kingdom
- Post town: WOODBRIDGE
- Postcode district: IP13
- Dialling code: 01728

Saxtead is a village and civil parish in the East Suffolk district, in the county of Suffolk, England. Saxtead gives its name to the settlements of Saxtead Green and Saxtead Little Green and the windmill Saxtead Green Windmill. The population of the civil parish at the 2011 Census was 335. Saxtead is located on the A1120 road in between the town of Stowmarket and the village of Yoxford.

The place-name 'Saxtead' is first attested in the Domesday Book of 1086, where it appears as Saxsteda. The name is thought to mean 'Seaxa's place'.

== Notable people ==
- Margaret Green, painter
