= Aldeburgh Beach Lookout =

Historic building in Suffolk, England

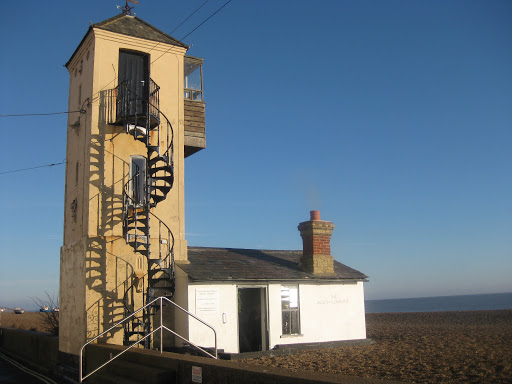

- Location within the United Kingdom
- 52.150563°N 1.602063°E
- Type: Coastal lookout
- Location: Aldeburgh, Suffolk

History
- Built: c. 1830

Site notes
- Current use: Art venue

Listed Building – Grade II
- Designated: August 1974
- Reference no.: 1269772

The Aldeburgh Beach Lookout is a historic landmark on the Aldeburgh sea front, in Suffolk, England. Grade II listed, it was built around 1830 as a lookout tower to assist or plunder shipping along the hazardous North Sea coast. It now houses an artistic space, hosting exhibitions by British artists including Sir Antony Gormley RA.

== History ==
In the 19th century, observation towers were constructed along the United Kingdom's coastline to help ships navigate treacherous waters and sail safely on. Lookouts, as they were called, were typically commercial operations in the business of rescuing or salvaging vessels. The Aldeburgh Beach Lookout is the southern of two lookouts on Aldeburgh beach; its rival, the North Lookout, stands approximately 100 yards north and now forms part of the Aldeburgh Lifeboat Station.

The South Lookout, now known as the Aldeburgh Beach Lookout, became a coastguard post before falling into disuse in the mid-20th century. South African writer and Aldeburgh resident Sir Laurens van der Post wrote inside the lookout for over 30 years, from the mid-1950s onwards.

== Current use ==
In 2010, the Aldeburgh Beach Lookout was co-founded by Francis Carnwath and Caroline Wiseman to provide an artistic space for the public to view modern art. Since then, the Lookout has hosted exhibitions by many international artists including Royal Academicians Antony Gormley, Alison Wilding, Nigel Hall, Chris Orr, and Eileen Cooper. Poets who have written in the Lookout include Blake Morrison and Ian McMillan. The Lookout has hosted philosophers and thinkers including A. C. Grayling and Andrew Marr.
