= Snape Anglo-Saxon Cemetery =

Anglo-Saxon burial site

Snape Ship Burial
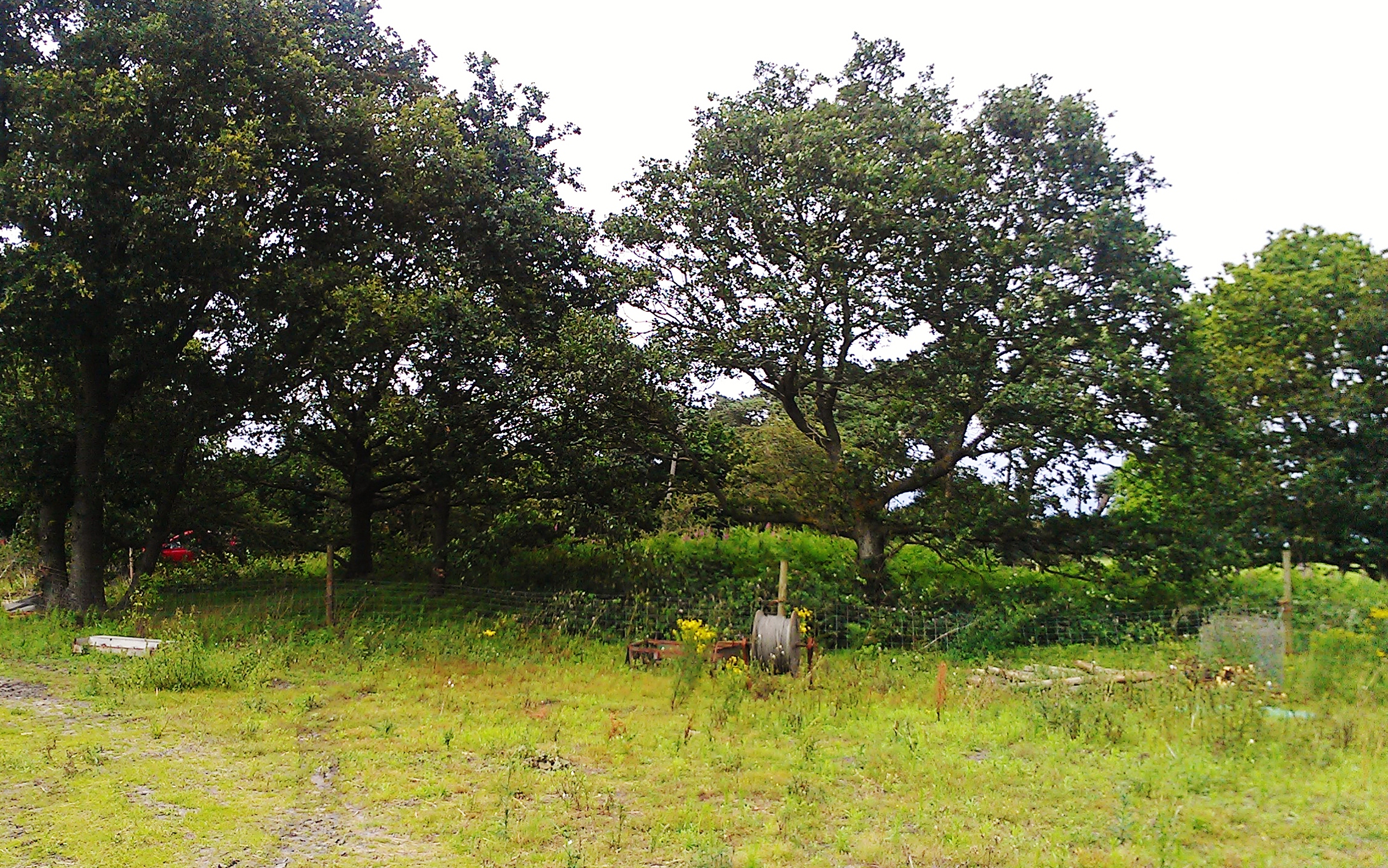
- Mound 4, one of the cemetery's six tumuli, as of 2012.

- Location within Suffolk
- Established: 6th century AD
- Location: Snape Common, Suffolk
- Coordinates: 52.179617°N 1.511981°E
- Type: Ship burial

The Snape Anglo-Saxon Cemetery is a place of burial dated to the 6th century AD located on Snape Common, near to the town of Aldeburgh in Suffolk, Eastern England. Dating to the early part of the Anglo-Saxon Era of English history, it contains a variety of different forms of burial, with inhumation and cremation burials being found in roughly equal proportions. The site is also known for the inclusion of a high status ship burial. A number of these burials were included within burial mounds.

The first recorded excavation of the site was conducted by antiquarians in 1827, with a later, more thorough investigation taking place in 1862 under the control of landowner Septimus Davidson. Artefacts from the earliest excavations soon disappeared, although important finds uncovered from the 1862 excavation included a glass claw beaker and the Snape Ring, now housed in The British Museum, London.

During the 20th century, the heathland that the cemetery was on was given over to farmland, with a road and house being constructed atop the site. Today, the burial mounds themselves are not accessible to the public, although the artefacts uncovered by the excavation are on display at the Aldeburgh Museum in the nearby coastal town of Aldeburgh.

== Location ==
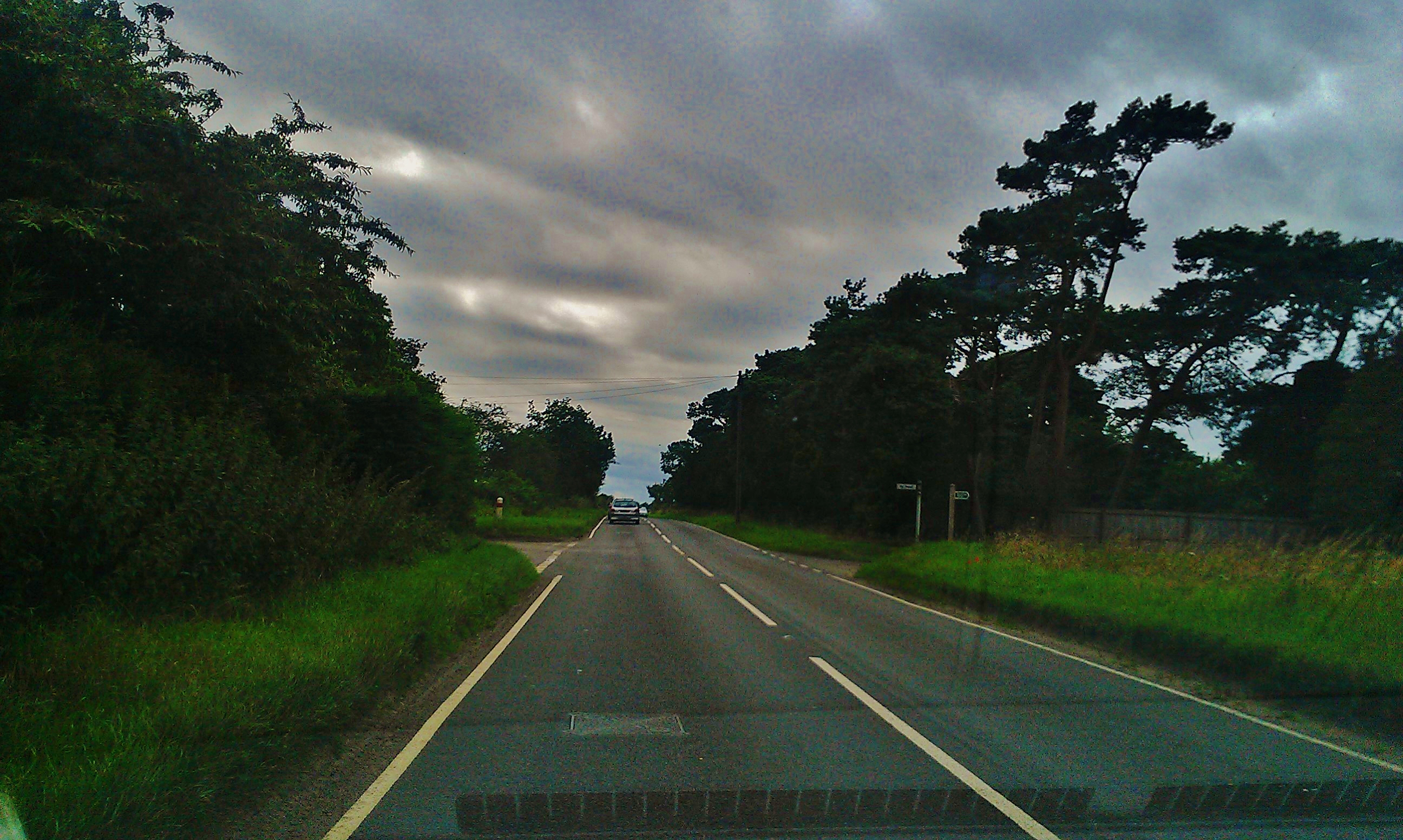
The A1094 road at the point where it bisects the Anglo-Saxon cemetery. On the right hand side is a series of pine trees shielding St Margaret's House from passing traffic.

The Snape Anglo-Saxon cemetery is located in the north-east corner of the modern parish of Snape, approximately 550 metres from the parish boundary with Friston. Although several modern houses stand on or near to the cemetery site, the main settlement at Snape village is located 1.5 kilometres away, with the village of Friston slightly nearer, at 1.25 kilometres away. The site is situated 2.5 kilometres north of the River Alde and 7 kilometres west of the coastal town of Aldeburgh and the North Sea. The cemetery is 17 kilometres north-east of the more famous Anglo-Saxon ship burial at Sutton Hoo.

Prior to the 20th century, the site was a part of a large area of acid Sandlings Heathland which stretched from Snape all the way to Aldeburgh and which was used primarily for sheep grazing. By the 19th century at the latest, a road was built that bisected the cemetery, now designated the A1094. However, in the 1950s much of the heath was developed for agricultural use growing rape, linseed, potatoes and rye. The largely stone-free glacial sand of the heath is highly free-draining, and so extensive irrigation is required in the growing season. Alongside the farmland and the A1094, parts of the cemetery were also converted into a house, named St. Margaret's, along with an accompanying garden.

The acidic soils in the area would have prevented the growth of most species of native British trees, and therefore it is probable that prior to the plantation of predominantly pine woodland in the vicinity of the cemetery during the 20th century, both the River Alde and the sea would have been visible from the mounds, as would the town of Iken.

== Background ==
Map showing the general locations of the Anglo-Saxon peoples around the year 600, based upon Bede's account

The Anglo-Saxon period saw widespread changes in the society, language and culture of much of eastern Britain. Surviving sources of evidence for England in the 5th and 6th centuries remain "few and unsatisfactory in the extreme", consisting of limited archaeological evidence (primarily burials) alongside three primary textual sources, only one of which, the monk Gildas' De Excidio et Conquestu Britanniae, is contemporary.

According to the monk Bede, writing in his Historia ecclesiastica gentis Anglorum in the 8th century, the Anglo-Saxon age began when three tribal groups from Northern Germany and Southern Denmark – the Saxons, Angles and Jutes – began to migrate into Britain, where they were initially employed as mercenaries by the indigenous Romano-British population following the collapse of Roman Imperial rule. Archaeological evidence corroborates this, but also indicates the likely presence of a fourth continental tribal group settling in Britain during the 5th and 6th centuries, the Frisians. It is likely that the new settlers did not adhere strictly to their old tribal and ethnic ties, with new syncretic blends developing and new identities forged as they mixed with one another and with the indigenous British population. There is evidence that these colonists maintained ties with the Germanic-language cultures of Scandinavia, Germany and Northern France; they certainly traded with these societies for luxury goods, and told epic stories such as Beowulf which were set in their ancestral lands.

The Snape cemetery lies within land that comprised a part of the Anglo-Saxon Kingdom of East Anglia, which according to Bede had been settled by the Angle tribe.

== Cemetery features ==
The Snape Anglo-Saxon cemetery has an east–west dimension of approximately 200 metres and a north–south dimension of approximately 70 metres. The ratio of the cremation to inhumation burials was approximately 1:1. Unlike at the Anglo-Saxon cemetery of Spong Hill in Norfolk, at Snape, these cremations and inhumations were not spatially divided, with both rites being completely intermixed and largely contemporary with one another.

At least nine – and possibly ten – tumuli, or burial mounds, were erected at the site.

=== The Ship Burial ===
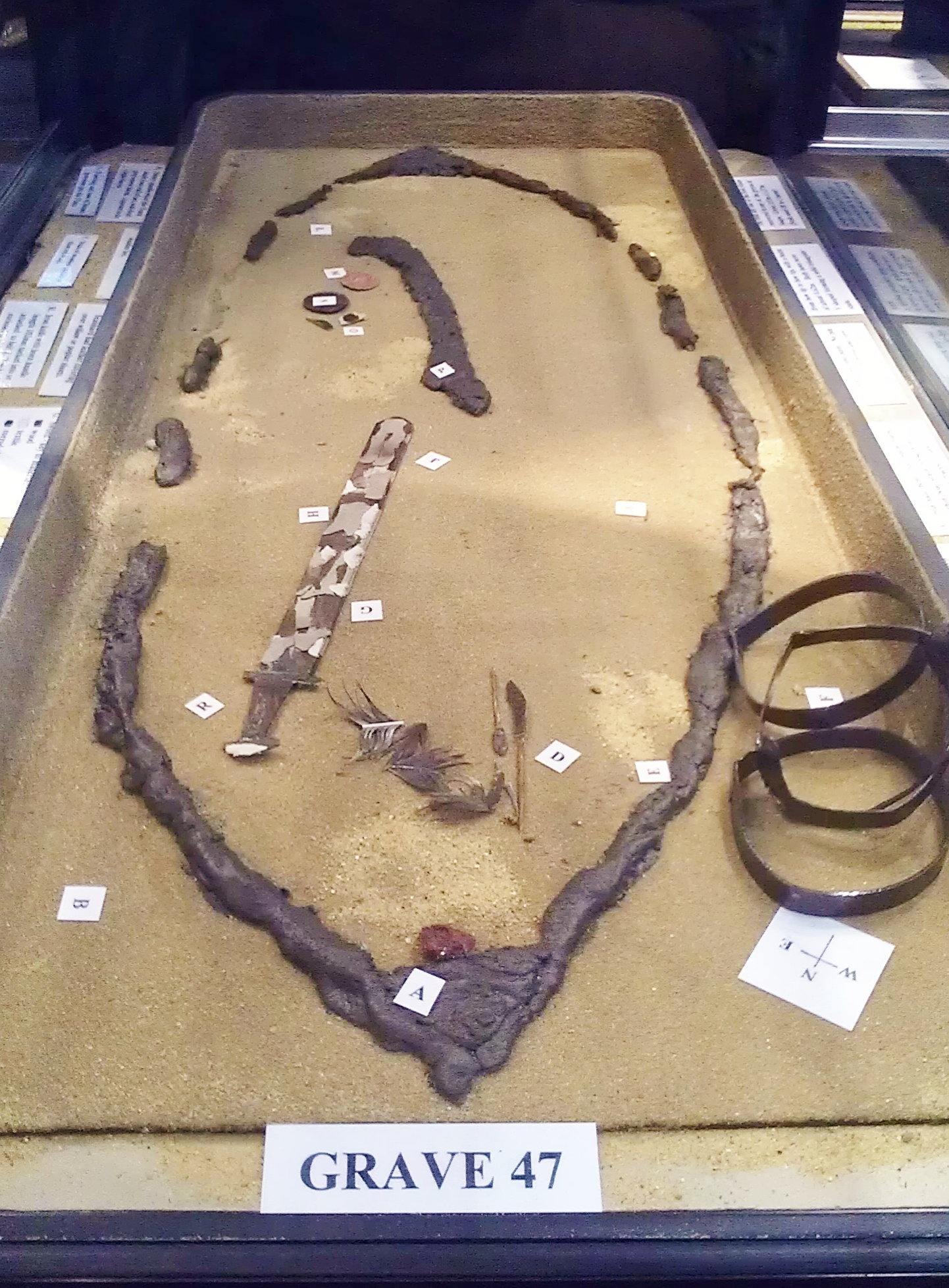
Model of the ship burial at Aldeburgh Museum

The Snape cemetery is best known for the ship burial that was uncovered there in 1862 by Septimus Davidson's excavation. Our knowledge of its shape and style comes from the accounts produced by Davidson and his excavators, alongside Davidson's plan, the most reliable version of which is a watercolour painting held in the library of the Society of Antiquaries; this was produced "either during or very shortly after the excavation", and was used as the basis for the subsequent engravings of the ship, for which extra, often erroneous details were added. Alongside these early accounts and plans, we also have access to the surviving rivets and other ironwork now housed in Aldeburgh Museum.

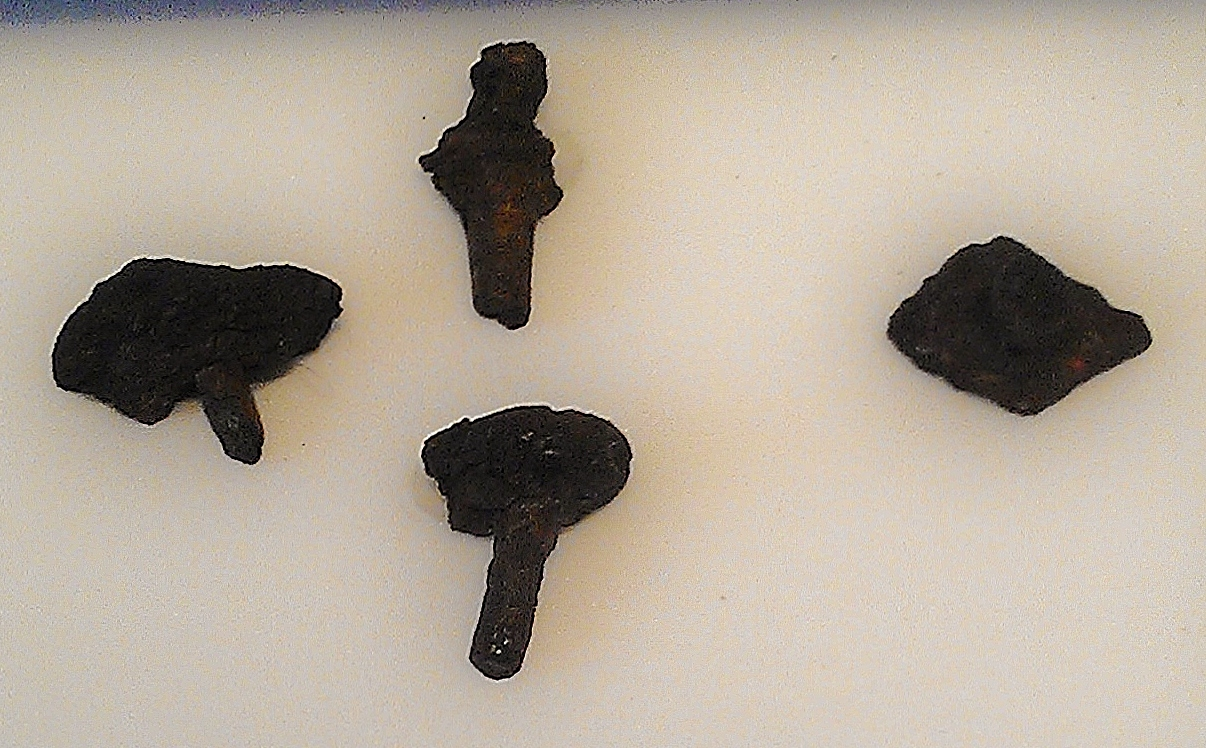
Rivets from the Snape ship on exhibit at Aldeburgh Museum

The ship was at least 14 metres long and contained a beam 3 metres in width. Clinker built with riveted construction, the rivets were spaced at intervals of approximately 140 millimetres and according to the watercolour painting, there were nine strakes a side. The rivets are of usual Anglo-Saxon style, being composed of iron and having domed heads and diamond roves. Excavators also uncovered fragments of a metal strip, at least 300 millimetres in length, which was vertically riveted to the outside of the hull. Filmer-Sankey noted that this could be interpreted as a chain plate that held the shrouds of a mast.

The boat was positioned on an east to west axis. It apparently once contained within it a high status burial, but the grave had already been robbed by the 1863 excavation, meaning that many of the grave goods had probably already been removed. Nevertheless, several grave goods had remained, and were discovered by Davidson and his excavators; these included two iron spearheads, suggesting that the burial might have been male, the gold Snape Ring and a glass claw beaker. Another find from the burial was initially described as a "mass of human hair... wrapped in a cloth of some kind", although later archaeologists reinterpreted this as a form of shaggy cloak akin to those found at Sutton Hoo and Broomfield. Also uncovered were some fragments initially identified as jasper and a single fragment of blue glass. The ship burial was relatively dated using these artefacts, meaning that the burial of the ship was given a "very tentative" terminus post quem of circa 550 CE.

== Significant artefacts ==
Funerary urn found at the burial

The best known artefact from the Anglo-Saxon burial is the Snape ring, which consists of a Roman onyx gemstone engraved with the figure of Bonus Eventus which has been set in a large hoop. After the original excavation the ring disappeared, and was returned to Bruce-Mitford (and then the British Museum) by the granddaughter of the original excavator.

Filmer-Sankey disputed Rupert Bruce-Mitford's analysis, arguing instead that the Snape Ring had been created in continental Europe, probably by Frankish craftsmen in the early-mid 6th century. Supporting this idea, he noted that it had close parallels in both form and decoration to Frankish jewelry of this date and that Germanic settings of Roman intaglios are common on the continent but otherwise unknown from Anglo-Saxon England.

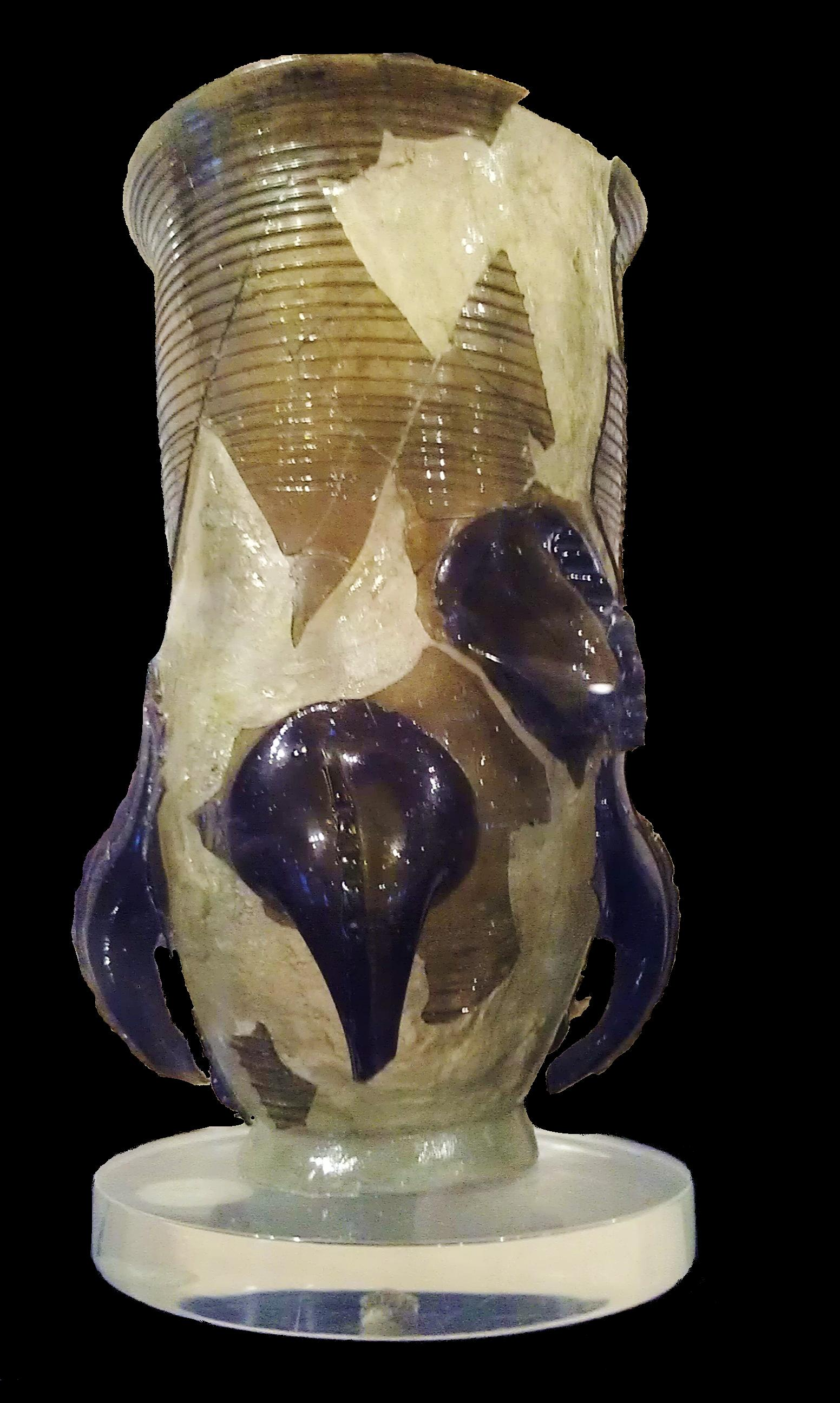
Claw beaker found at the burial

Another of the significant finds from the burial was a glass claw-beaker. Filmer-Sankey noted that it probably dated to the mid-sixth century.

== Antiquarian and archaeological investigation ==
The first recorded excavation at the site took place in 1827, when seven or eight gentlemen, reported to be Londoners, opened up several of the barrows at the site, discovering "quantities of gold rings, brooches, chains etc." After their activities at Snape, they proceeded to dig up a tumulus on the other side of the River Alde, at Blaxhall Common. Little is known of their findings, but a letter recording the event was sent to The Field magazine in March 1863 by a man from Snape who was only a boy at the time of the original excavation. Nothing more is known of either the excavators or the artefacts that they unearthed. It is believed that the mounds were excavated for a second time in the mid-19th century by antiquarians working for the Ordnance Survey; no records of this investigation have been found.

=== Davidson excavation: 1862–1863 ===
"Although none of the excavators appear to have had any previous excavation experience, or indeed special knowledge of archaeology, they nevertheless carried out the excavation in an exemplary way, for which we owe them a great debt. In the first place, they were not treasure hunters... The reason for the excavation was their own intellectual curiosity."

— Archaeologist William Filmer-Sankey on the 1862 dig, 2001.

A third, more systematic and thorough excavation of the cemetery was then undertaken in 1862 by Septimus Davidson, the landowner of the area of the heath that fell to the north of the bisecting road. A city solicitor and former legal adviser to the government of the Ottoman Empire, he had no training in excavation, but was curious as to the historic mounds that lay on his land. He was assisted in this endeavor by three others: local surgeon Dr Nicholas Hele, and two other men known only as Francis Francis and 'Mr C'. Although none of them had any training in excavation, they did so in a meticulous manner, starting with a pit in the centre of each mound and then digging outwards, all the time recording the position of artefacts, such as the ship rivets, in situ. There were nevertheless problems, such as when a spade shattered the rim of a buried urn. With the exception of Mr C, the excavators each wrote and published their own accounts of the excavation, which displayed a great deal of consistency with one another. Davidson's account was presented at a meeting of the Society of Antiquaries in January 1863, while Francis published two articles in The Field in January and March 1863, followed by a paper for the Archaeological Journal. Hele then devoted a chapter to the excavation in his 1870 book Notes and Jottings about Aldeburgh.

Commenting on the site, Davidson noted that it contained either nine or ten mounds, five of which were described as "large". He excavated only three of the large mounds which were owned by him and which had come to be damaged by passing traffic. In two of these, he found no evidence of a grave, but in the third uncovered the remains of a ship burial, which he recorded in a level of detail unknown at the time. The current knowledge of this burial relies largely on Davidson's account from the time. The discovery of the ship burial was the first of its kind to have been discovered and recognised in England, although two years previously excavators at Sutton Hoo had dug through a boat burial without realising what it was. Although novel in Britain, such ship burials had already been uncovered and reported on by archaeologists working in Scandinavia. Enthused by the success of the dig, he decided to return to excavate at the cemetery the following year, putting in a trench twelve yards long which unearthed over forty vases and a few other finds.

=== Subsequent finds: 1920–1985 ===
In the 1920s, the cemetery site saw the construction of a house known as St. Margaret's, immediately north of the three mounds that Davidson had excavated. The tumuli themselves became a part of the house's garden, which was ringed with some newly planted pines. It has been claimed that various urns were discovered both in the construction of the house and when digging holes for the plantation of the trees, although such claims have never been corroborated and the finds never located. During the Second World War, the heathland began to be ploughed for agricultural usage, although no finds were ever reported. In 1951, the mounds on the southern side of the road, which Davidson had not excavated, were also ploughed over, although again no finds were recorded.

The importance of Snape cemetery within Anglo-Saxon archaeology had been eclipsed by the 1939 excavation of the ship burial under Mound 1 at Sutton Hoo under the directorship of Basil Brown (1888–1977). In an academic paper published in the pages of the Proceedings of the Suffolk Institute of Archaeology in 1952, the archaeologist Rupert Bruce-Mitford (1914–1994) began Snape's rehabilitation by providing a full summary of Dickinson's excavation, later being described by archaeologist William Filmer-Sankey as "a brilliant synthesis of what was then known".

In 1970 a dowser named Major-General Scott-Elliott was exploring the cemetery and uncovered a single urn about 40 metres west of the garden. In 1972, a sewer trench was being dug along the northern side of the road, and after a local resident alerted Ipswich Museum it was agreed that archaeologists would observe the construction. They subsequently recovered nine cremations, seven being urned, one being in a thin bronze bowl and the other being loose. The landscape having been dramatically altered since Dickinson's excavations, in 1982 Stephen Dockrill of the School of Archaeological Science at Bradford University undertook two trial magnetometry and resistivity trial surveys of the site; the latter showed a possible base and ring-ditch surrounding a ploughed-out tumulus. Over the following three years, the resistivity survey was extended to cover 13,000 m^{2} of the area, first under the leadership of Dockrill and then of Dr Roger Walker of Geoscan Research. The results however were of little use, showing no Anglo-Saxon features against the variable geological background.

=== Filmer-Sankey excavation: 1985–1992 ===
Renewed archaeological interest in the Snape site came about following the 1983 commencement of new excavations at Sutton Hoo under the directorship of Martin Carver of the University of York. Carver had emphasised that Sutton Hoo had to be understood in the wider East Anglian context, a part of which was Snape.

Exhibit on the burial at Aldeburgh Museum

Filmer-Sankey's investigation was twofold. First, he undertook a thorough investigation into the documents pertaining to previous excavations at the site, through which his team ascertained that although the ship burial was the most notable feature of the site, the cemetery primarily contained cremation burials, and was therefore best compared with the Norfolk cemetery of Spong Hill. This accomplished, the secondary task of developing a sampling strategy had to be devised. The use of fieldwalking and geophysical survey had already proved unsuccessful, and so it was decided that excavation would be used as the primary method of investigation. In 1985, fourteen 3×3 trenches were opened, but only two cremation urns, both damaged by ploughing, were uncovered. One of these trenches was subsequently enlarged to 6×6 metres, revealing both two further funerary urns and an inhumation burial. This discovery meant that the excavators had to rethink their sampling strategy and wider approach to the site.

From 1986 through to 1988, the excavation team dug up a total of an area that was 17 × 20 metres in the field believed to be adjacent to the original ship burial, producing 17 cremation and 21 inhumation burials, one of which was the smaller boat burial. From 1989 through to 1990, the plan was to use the information gathered over the previous two years to devise a strategy that would locate the limits of the cemetery. This led to the excavation of eighteen trenches, each 2 metres wide and orientated north-to-south, on the assumed edges of the cemetery.

In 1992, Filmer-Sankey published an overview of the excavations that had taken place up to that date as an academic paper in Martin Carver's edited anthology, The Age of Sutton Hoo: The Seventh Century in North-Western Europe. Filmer-Sankey's final excavation report eventually appeared in 2001 as the 95th volume in the East Anglian Archaeology Report series published by Suffolk County Council.

== See also ==
- List of Anglo-Saxon cemeteries
