= Carnwath (surname) =

Carnwath is a surname. Notable people include:

- Alison Carnwath (born 1953), British businesswoman
- Sir Andrew Carnwath (1909–1995), British banker
- Francis Carnwath (1940–2020), director of the Greenwich Foundation for the Royal Naval College
- Robert Carnwath, Lord Carnwath of Notting Hill (born 1945), British Supreme Court judge
- Squeak Carnwath (born 1947), American painter and arts educator
