= Helen David =

British fashion designer

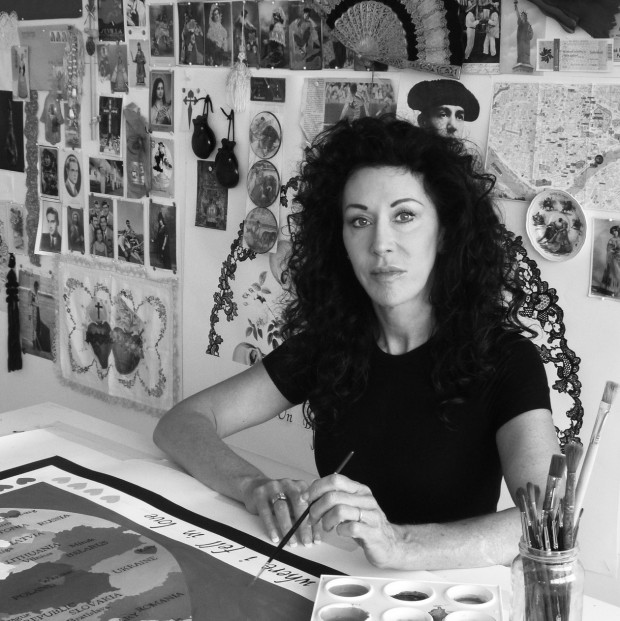
- A portrait of Helen David at work
- Born: Helen Littman; Brighton, United Kingdom
- Education: Camberwell School of Art, Central St. Martins
- Occupation: Fashion designer
- Years active: 1983–Present
- Spouse: Colin David
- Awards: Evening wear, 1999 (British Fashion Awards) (London Fashion Week)
- Website: helenandcolindavid.com

Helen David is a London-based visual artist, textile designer and founder of the design house English Eccentrics [1983-2000].

== Early life and education ==
Born in the City of Brighton and Hove in 1955, she moved to London to study fine artprintmaking, fashion and textiles at Camberwell College of Arts and Central Saint Martins. During this time she became involved with the London Underground culture of the '80s and frequented places such as the Blitz Club, where the New Romantic styling that she is well known for was born.

== Career with English Eccentrics ==
In 1983, David founded the design label English Eccentrics along with her sister, Judy Purbeck, and fellow designer, Claire Angel. The label specialised in hand-printed and hand-embroidered evening wear and scarves. She participated in the "London Goes to Tokyo" event organized by Susanne Bartsch, a show intended to broaden the reach of British designers. Her clothes have been worn by several performers including Mick Jagger, Prince, Paul McCartney, Helen Mirren, Helena Bonham Carter and Toyah Willcox.

In 2001 she took time away from the business to concentrate on art. David's fashion and textile work is part of permanent collections in the Victoria and Albert Museum, the Museum of London and the Art Institute of Chicago.

== Exhibitions ==
- 2005 Friends and Icons, one-woman art exhibition curated by Laura Parker-Bowles.
- 2014 Not Only When The Moon Shines studio show, King’s Cross
- 2014 They Had No Choice embroideries and photography at the Time Bleeds group show for Folkestone Triennial Fringe.
- 2016 Not A Good Girl Yet embroidery from the Moments: Why I feel How I Feel series at Face Value, Collier Bristol, London. curator Kathleen Soriano.
- 2018 Bollywood Gangstas Pincushion, Royal Academy Summer Exhibition. curator Grayson Perry.
- 2018 This Moment Film, [1 minute], at Alive in the Universe-Venice Biennale. curator Caroline Wiseman.
- 2019 Selected embroideries in a Group Show at the Assembly Point Gallery, Peckham, London.
- 2020 Hold my Hand pincushion for Cure 3 at Bonhams, curators, Susie Allen-Huxley and Laura Culpan for Artwise Curators.
- 2021 Together We are Strong Pincushion, and Head, Heart, Fortune, Life rug-painting, both at Royal Academy Summer Exhibition. curator Yinka Shonibare.
- 2023 You Make Me Smile pincushion for Cure 3 at Bonhams, curators, Susie Allen-Huxley and Laura Culpan for Artwise Curators.
- 2024 English Eccentrics three outfits in Outlaws:Fashion Renegades of 1980s at the Fashion and Textile Museum, London, curators Martin Green and N.J.Stevenson.
- 2025 With Love From The Past pincushion for Cure 3 at Bonhams, curators, Susie Allen-Huxley and Laura Culpan for Artwise Curators.
- 2025 We Can Be Heroes pincushion at the Royal Academy Summer Exhibition curated by Farshid Moussavi.

== Film ==
Helen David’s 37 Seasons, documentary directed by Oliver David, Winner of the Sarajevo Fashion Film Festival 2024 Documentary Award

== Books ==
- McDermott, Catherine & David, Helen, (1994), "English Eccentrics The Textile Designs of Helen Littman", Phaidon, ISBN 1-85454-205-2
- Ed. by Breward, Christopher and Wood, Ghislaine, (2012) "British Design from 1948: Innovation in the Modern Age", V and A books, ISBN 978-1-85177-674-0
- Marnie Fogg, (2009), "1980s Fashion Print", Batsford, ISBN 978-1-906388-41-6
- John Sorrell, (2009) "Creative Island 2", Laurence King Publishing Ltd, ISBN 978-1-85669-626-5
- Richard Martin, (1989), "Fashion and Surrealism", Thames and Hudson, ISBN 0-500-27550-5
- Ed. by Sonnet Stanfill, (2013), "From Club to Catwalk – 80's Fashion", V&A Publishing, ISBN 978-1-851-77725-9
