= Iken Wood =

Protected area in Suffolk, England

Coordinates: 52.155°N 1.498°E

- Site of Special Scientific Interest
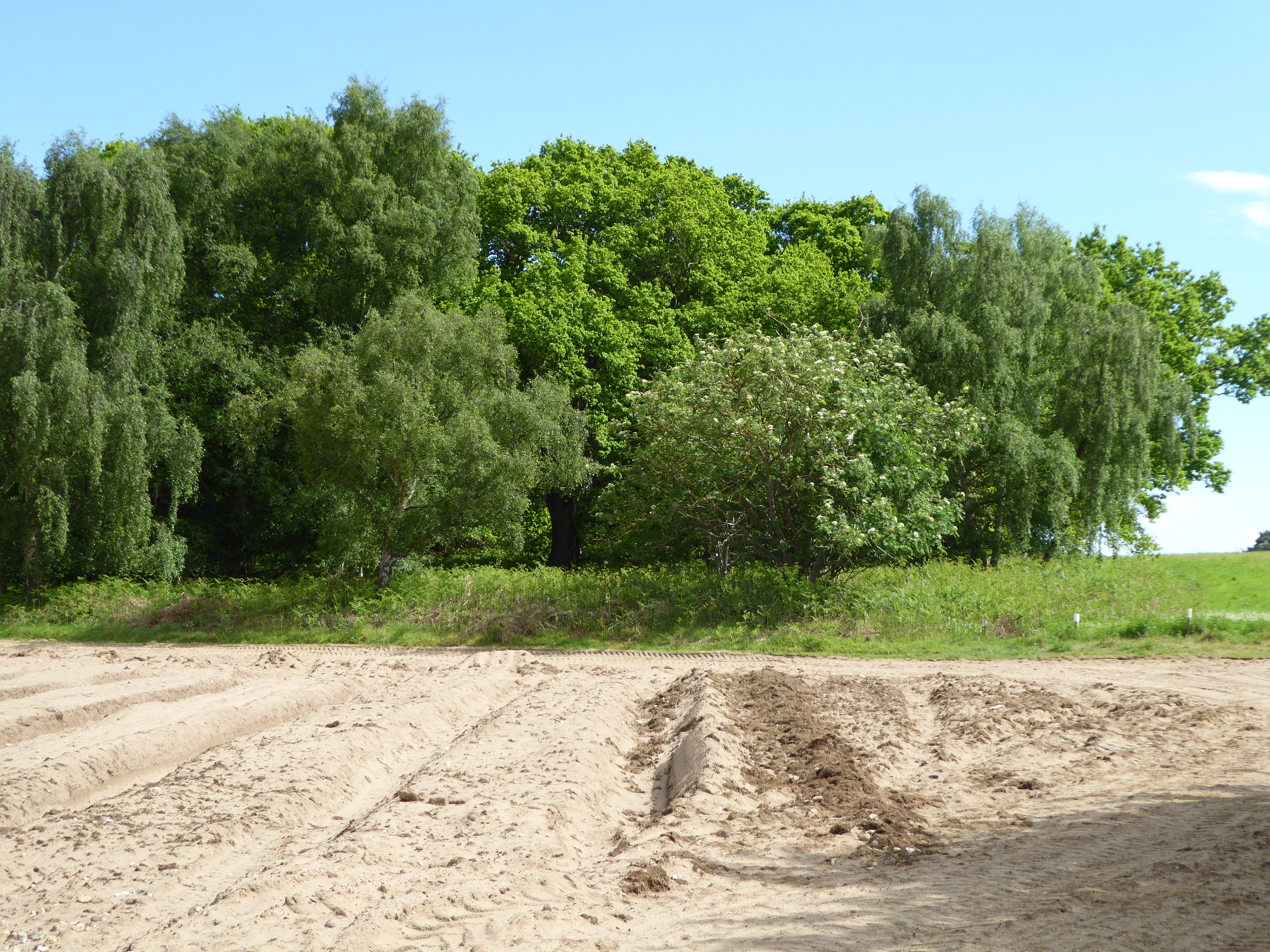
- Location of Iken Wood.
- Area of search: Suffolk
- Grid reference: TM 394 565
- Interest: Biological
- Area: 5.3 hectares
- Notification date: 1986
- Location map: Magic Map

Iken Wood is a 5.3-hectare (13-acre) biological Site of Special Scientific Interest south of Snape in Suffolk. It is in the Suffolk Coast and Heaths Area of Outstanding Natural Beauty.

This is probably the only ancient coppice wood on blown sand in Britain. Massive oak standards are dominant, and there are stools with a diameter of 3 metres (10 feet). Other trees include silver birch, holly and rowan.

The site is private land with no public access.
