= Carnwath (disambiguation) =

Carnwath may refer to:

- Carnwath, moorland village on the southern edge of the Pentland Hills of South Lanarkshire, Scotland
- Carnwath (surname)
- Carnwath Farms Historic Site & Park, 99.7 acre estate turned park in Wappinger, New York, US
- Carnwath railway station, railway station in Carnwath
- Earl of Carnwath, title in the Peerage of Scotland
