= Snape Warren =

Protected area in Suffolk, England

Coordinates: 52.17°N 1.52°E

- Site of Special Scientific Interest
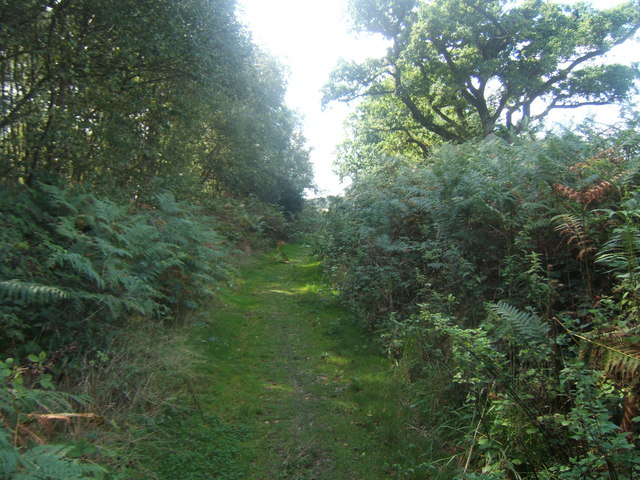
- Location of Snape Warren.
- Area of search: Suffolk
- Grid reference: TM 406 578
- Interest: Biological
- Area: 48.0 hectares
- Notification date: 1989
- Location map: Magic Map

Snape Warren is a 48 hectare biological Site of Special Scientific Interest east of Snape in Suffolk. It is part of the Sandlings Special Protection Area under the European Union Directive on the Conservation of Wild Birds, and in the Suffolk Coast and Heaths Area of Outstanding Natural Beauty.

This site on sandy soils is an example of the lowland heath of eastern England, which has greatly declined since the 1940s. The heath, which is dominated by ling, is interspersed with areas of acid grassland, where the most common grasses are common bent and sheep's fescue.

Footpaths from Snape go through the site.
