= Moot Hall, Aldeburgh =

Municipal building in Aldeburgh, Suffolk, England

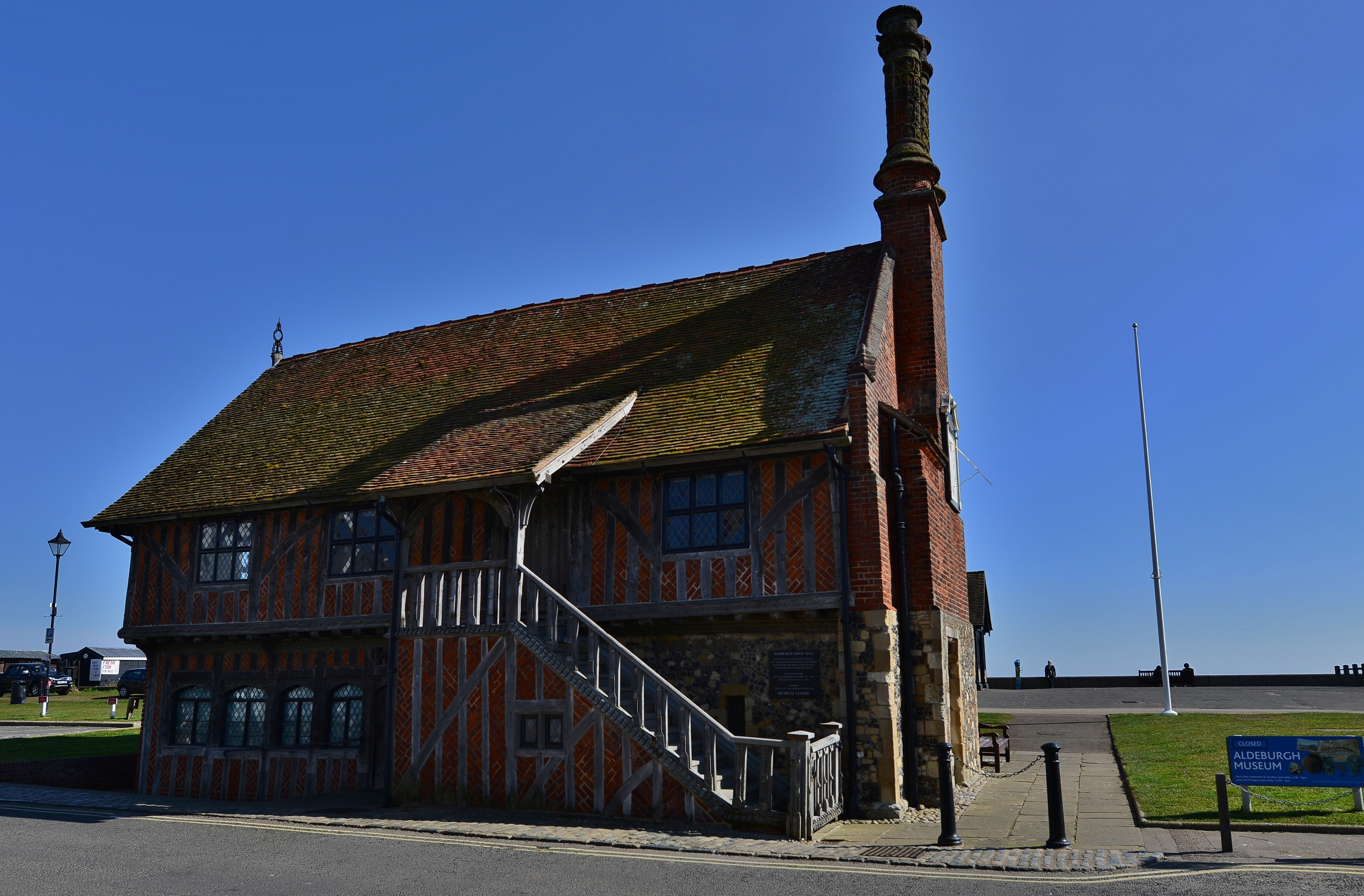
- Moot Hall, Aldeburgh

- Shown in Suffolk
- 52.1549°N 1.6029°E
- Location: Market Cross Place, Aldeburgh

History
- Built: c.1520

Site notes
- Architectural style: Tudor style

Listed Building – Grade I
- Official name: Moot Hall
- Designated: 27 February 1950
- Reference no.: 1269716

The Moot Hall is a municipal building in Market Cross Place in Aldeburgh, Suffolk, England. The building, which is the meeting place of Aldeburgh Town Council, is a Grade I listed building.

== History ==
=== The building ===
The building was designed in the Tudor style, built using timber frame construction techniques with wattle and daub and brick nog infilling, and was completed around 1520. The design involved an asymmetrical main frontage facing west onto Market Cross Place. On the ground floor, the left-hand section featured six arched openings, the first four of which were later infilled with two-light casement windows and the last two of which were infilled by doorways. The right-hand section featured an external staircase, with a pentice roof, providing access to the first floor. On the first floor, which was jettied out over the pavement, the two bays to the left of the doorway and the bay to its right were fenestrated by three-light mullioned casement windows. Internally, the ground floor was laid out as series of shops, while the first floor accommodated the council chamber. The architectural historian, Nikolaus Pevsner, described the building as "picturesque".

In 1645, the building was the location for the trial, under the direction of the witchfinder general, Matthew Hopkins, of seven alleged witches who were subsequently hanged. The building was altered in 1654 and the gable-ends and the staircase were restored to a design by the chief architect of the Diocese of Norwich, R. M. Phipson, in 1855.

Aldeburgh had a very small electorate and the parliamentary candidates were selected by the burgesses, which meant it was recognised by the UK Parliament as a rotten borough. Its right to elect members of parliament was removed by the Reform Act 1832, and its borough council, which met in the moot hall, was reformed under the Municipal Corporations Act 1883. The moot hall was the venue for the mayor-making ceremony on 9 November 1908, when the physician and suffragist, Elizabeth Garrett Anderson, became the first female mayor in England. Queen Elizabeth II visited the building to see the museum when she attended the Aldeburgh Festival in 1967. The building continued to serve as a meeting place for the borough council, but ceased to be the local seat of government when the enlarged Suffolk Coastal District Council was formed in 1974. Instead, it became the meeting place of Aldeburgh Town Council.

=== The museum ===
The Aldeburgh Museum was established by the Aldeburgh Literary Society in a building in Aldeburgh High Street in 1912. The collection was placed in store in the 1940s but taken out of store and placed on display on the ground floor of the moot hall in 1955. The museum became a charitable incorporated organisation known as the Aldeburgh Museum Charitable Trust in 2016. Items in the collection include archaeological remains from the Snape Anglo-Saxon Cemetery and other local sites, a 14th century chest used for the storage of the borough records, and items relating to the Aldeburgh lifeboat disaster, in which seven lifeboatmen died, in 1899.

== See also ==
- Grade I listed buildings in East Suffolk District
