= Aldeburgh =

Coastal town in Suffolk, England

Coordinates: 52.15°N 1.6°E

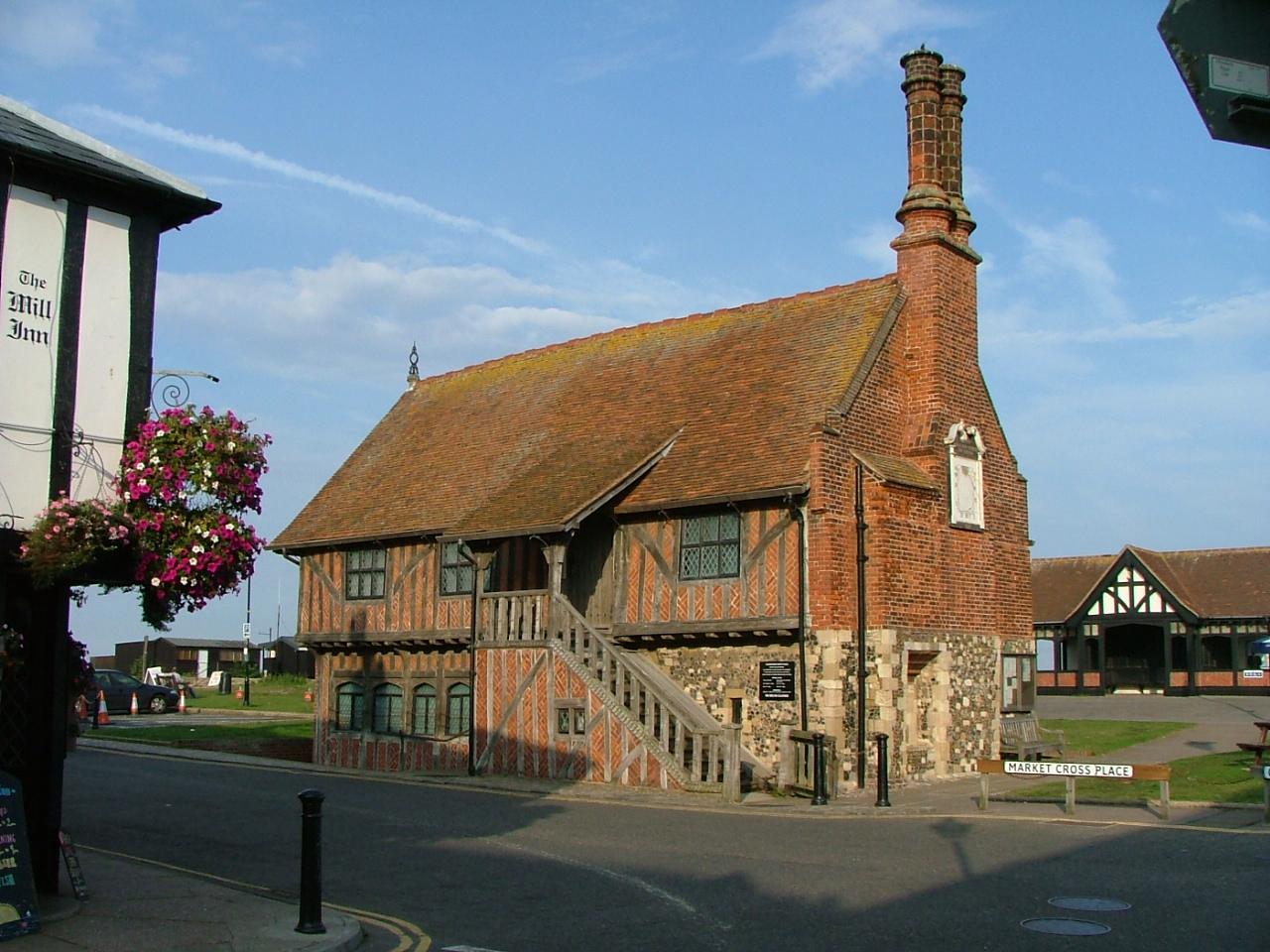
- The Moot Hall

- The town's flag

- Location within Suffolk
- Interactive map of Aldeburgh
- Population: 2,348 (2024 Mid Year Population Estimates)
- OS grid reference: TM463566
- Civil parish: Aldeburgh
- District: East Suffolk
- Shire county: Suffolk
- Region: East
- Country: England
- Sovereign state: United Kingdom
- Post town: ALDEBURGH
- Postcode district: IP15
- Dialling code: 01728
- Police: Suffolk
- Fire: Suffolk
- Ambulance: East of England
- UK Parliament: Suffolk Coastal

Aldeburgh (/ˈɔːlbərə/ AWL-bər-ə) is a coastal town and civil parish in the East Suffolk district, in the county of Suffolk, England, north of the River Alde. Its estimated population was 2,348 in 2024. It was home to the composer Benjamin Britten and remains the centre of the international Aldeburgh Festival of arts at nearby Snape Maltings, which was founded by Britten in 1948. It also hosts an annual poetry festival and several food festivals and other events.

Aldeburgh, as a port, gained borough status in 1529 under Henry VIII. Its historic buildings include a 16th-century moot hall and a Napoleonic-era Martello Tower. A third of its housing consists of second homes. Visitors are drawn to its Blue Flag beach and fisherman huts, where fresh fish is sold, to Aldeburgh Yacht Club and to its cultural offerings. Two family-run fish and chip shops have been rated among the country's best. The independent Aldeburgh bookshop has been in business for more than seventy years, is locally thought to have been the site of the birthplace of George Crabbe (1754–1832) and has organised the annual Aldeburgh Literary Festival since 2002.

== History ==
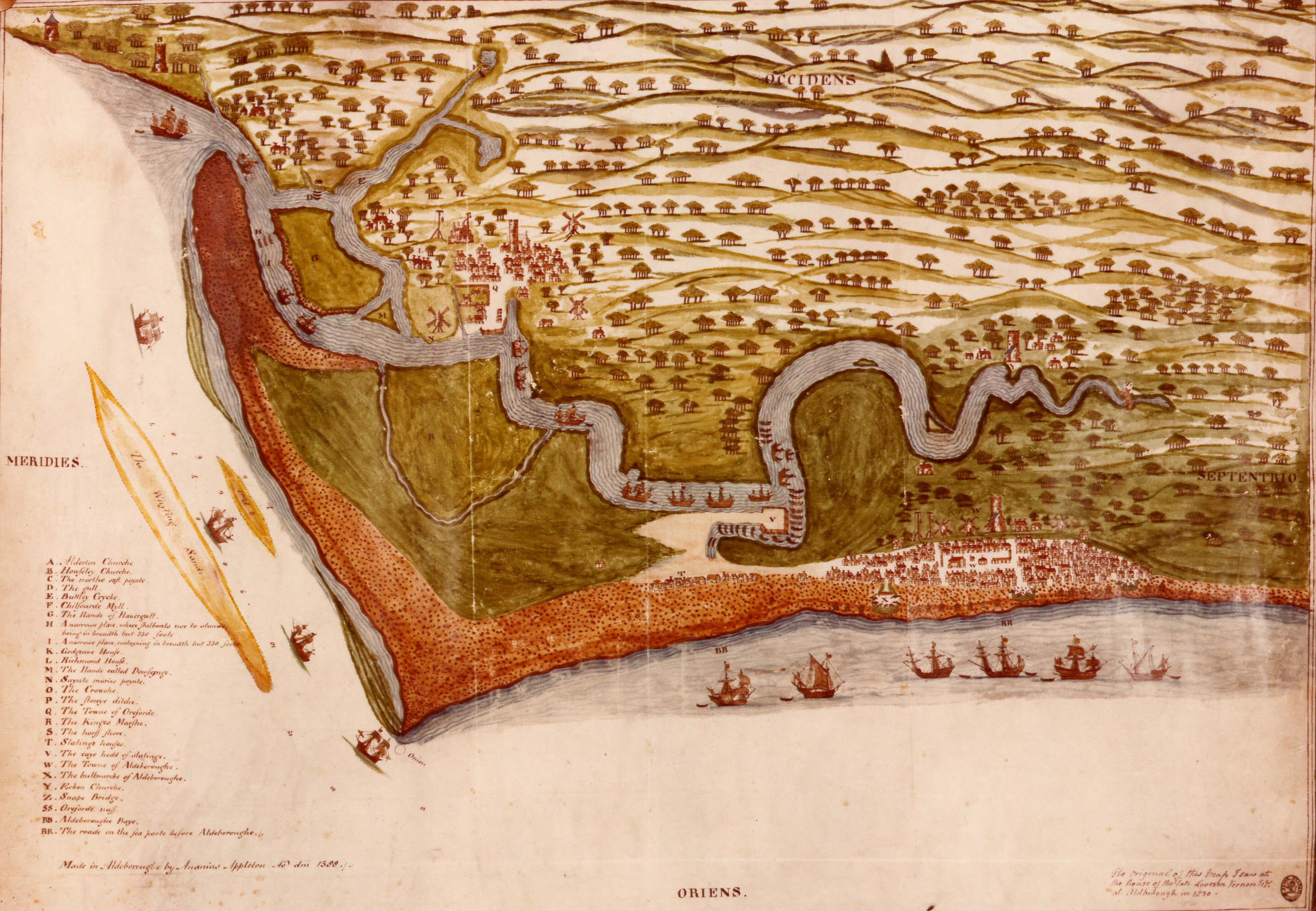
Aldeburgh is the bottom-right settlement shown in this 1588 map

The name "Aldeburgh" derives from the Old English ald (old) and burh (fortification), although this structure, along with much of the Tudor town, has now been lost to the sea. In the 16th century, Aldeburgh was a leading port and had a flourishing shipbuilding industry. The flagship of the Virginia Company, the Sea Venture is believed to have been built here in 1608. Aldeburgh's importance as a port declined as the River Alde silted up and larger ships could no longer berth. It survived mainly on fishing until the 19th century, when it also became a seaside resort. Much of its distinctive, whimsical architecture dates from that period. The river is now home to a yacht club and a sailing club.

Between 1959 and 1968, the village was the location of a Royal Observer Corps monitoring bunker, to be used in the event of a nuclear attack. The bunker was later demolished and no trace survives.

== Geography ==
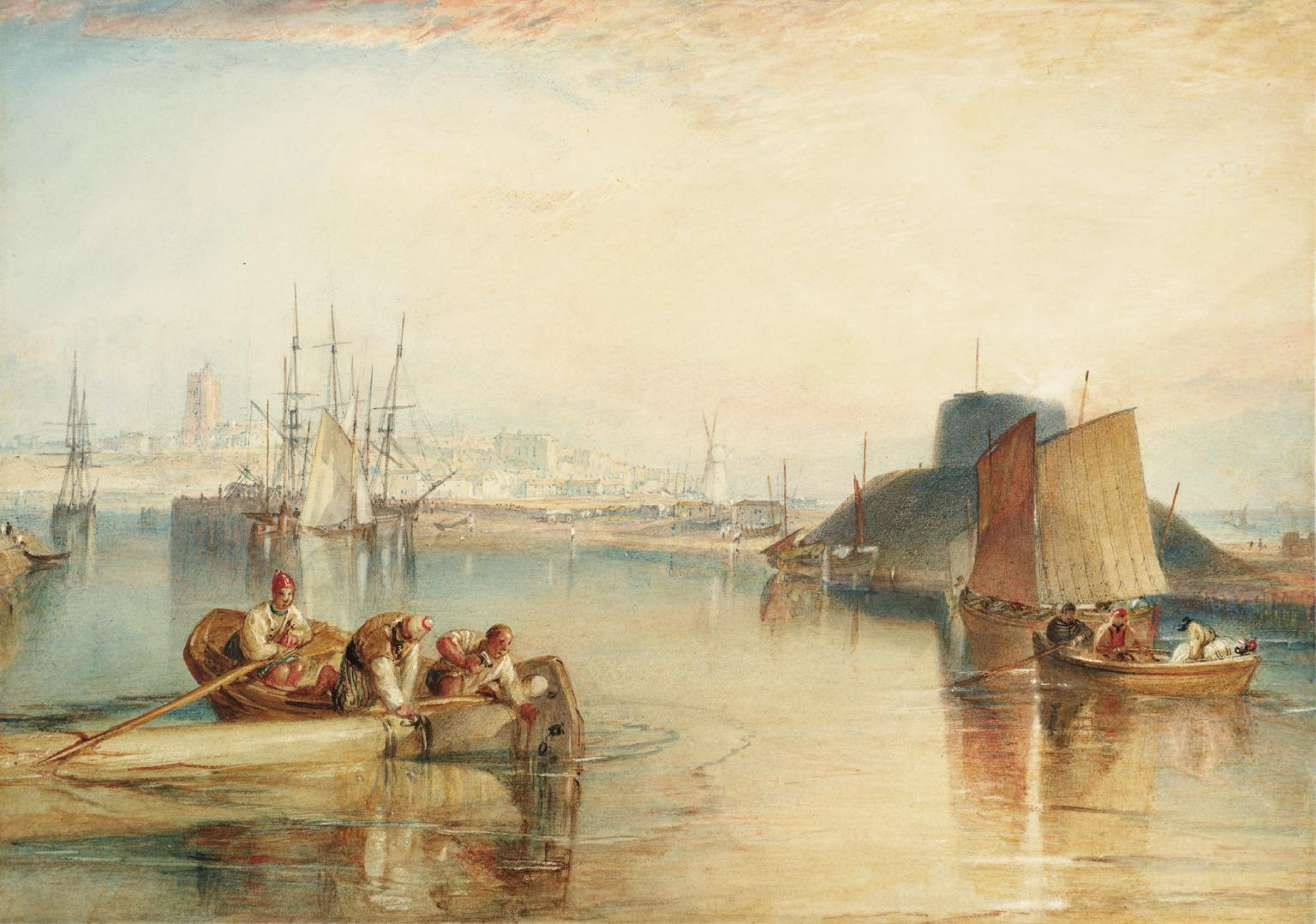
Aldborough, Suffolk c. 1826, by J. M. W. Turner

Aldeburgh is on the North Sea coast, about 87 miles (140 kilometres) north-east of London, 20 mi (32 km) north-east of Ipswich and 23 mi (37 km) south of Lowestoft. Locally it is 4 mi (6 km) south of the town of Leiston and 2 mi (3 km) south of the village of Thorpeness. It lies just north of the River Alde, with the narrow shingle spit of Orford Ness all that stops the river meeting the sea at Aldeburgh – instead it flows another 9 mi (14 km) to the south-west.

The beach is mainly shingle and wide in places, allowing fishing boats to draw up onto the beach above the high tide, but it narrows at the neck of Orford Ness. The shingle bank allows access to the Ness from the north, passing a Martello tower and two yacht clubs at the site of the former village of Slaughden. Aldeburgh was flooded in the North Sea flood of 1953, after which its flood defences were strengthened. The beach received a Blue Flag rural beach award in 2005.

The town is within the Suffolk Coast and Heaths Area of Outstanding Natural Beauty (AONB), with a number of Sites of Special Scientific Interest (SSSI) and nature reserves in its locality. The Alde-Ore Estuary SSSI covers the area surrounding the river from Snape to its mouth, including the whole of Orford Ness. This contains several salt marsh and mudflat habitats. The Leiston-Aldeburgh SSSI extends from the northern edge of the town over a range of habitats, including grazing marsh and heathland. It includes Thorpeness Mere and the North Warren RSPB reserve, an area of wildlife and habitat conservation, and nature trails run by the Royal Society for the Protection of Birds.

Two smaller geological SSSI units lie on the southern edges. Aldeburgh Brick Pit, of 0.84-hectare (2.1-acre), shows a clear stratigraphy of Red Crag deposits above Corralline Crag. Aldeburgh Hall Pit is a shallow pit 0.8 ha (2.0 acres) in area, featuring a section of Corralline Crag. It is seen as one of the best sites in Britain for Neogene fauna.

The town's churches include the pre-Reformation Anglican parish church of St Peter and St Paul and the Catholic Church of Our Lady and St Peter.

== Governance ==
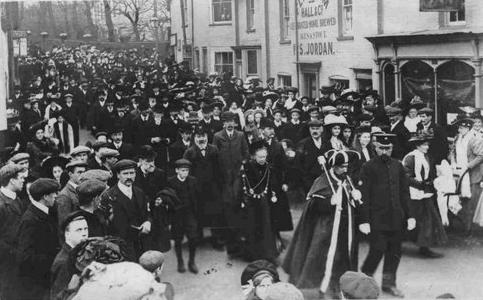
Elizabeth Garrett Anderson, Mayor of Aldeburgh, 1908

Aldeburgh has a town council and lies within the East Suffolk non-metropolitan district. Aldeburgh ward, including Thorpeness and other communities, had a population of 3225 in the 2011 census, when the mean age of the inhabitants was 55 and the median age 61.

The town is located within the Suffolk Coastal parliamentary constituency represented since 2024 by the Labour MP Jenny Riddell-Carpenter. The constituency was previous seen as a safe seat for the Conservatives, having been represented by John Gummer from 1979 to 2010 and Thérèse Coffey from 2010 to 2024.

Aldeburgh was a parliamentary borough from 1571 and returned two Members of Parliament (MPs), the right to vote being vested in the town's freemen. By the mid-18th century it was classed as a rotten borough, as the votes were controlled by a City of London merchant, Thomas Fonnereau: and memorably described as "a venal little borough in Suffolk". It lost its representation under the Reform Act 1832.

In 1908 Aldeburgh became the first British town to elect a female mayor: Elizabeth Garrett Anderson, whose father, Newson Garrett, had been mayor in 1889. In 2006, Sam Wright became Aldeburgh's town crier and mace bearer at 15, and so the youngest in the world.

In 1885 Aldeburgh became a municipal borough which became part of the administrative county of East Suffolk in 1889, the district contained the parish of Aldeburgh. On 1 April 1934 part of Hazlewood parish was added Aldeburgh parish and district from Plomesgate Rural District when Hazlewood was abolished. On 1 April 1974 the district was abolished and became part of Suffolk Coastal in the non-metropolitan county of Suffolk. A successor parish was formed covering the same area as the former district and its parish. In 2019 Aldeburgh became part of East Suffolk district.

== Transport ==
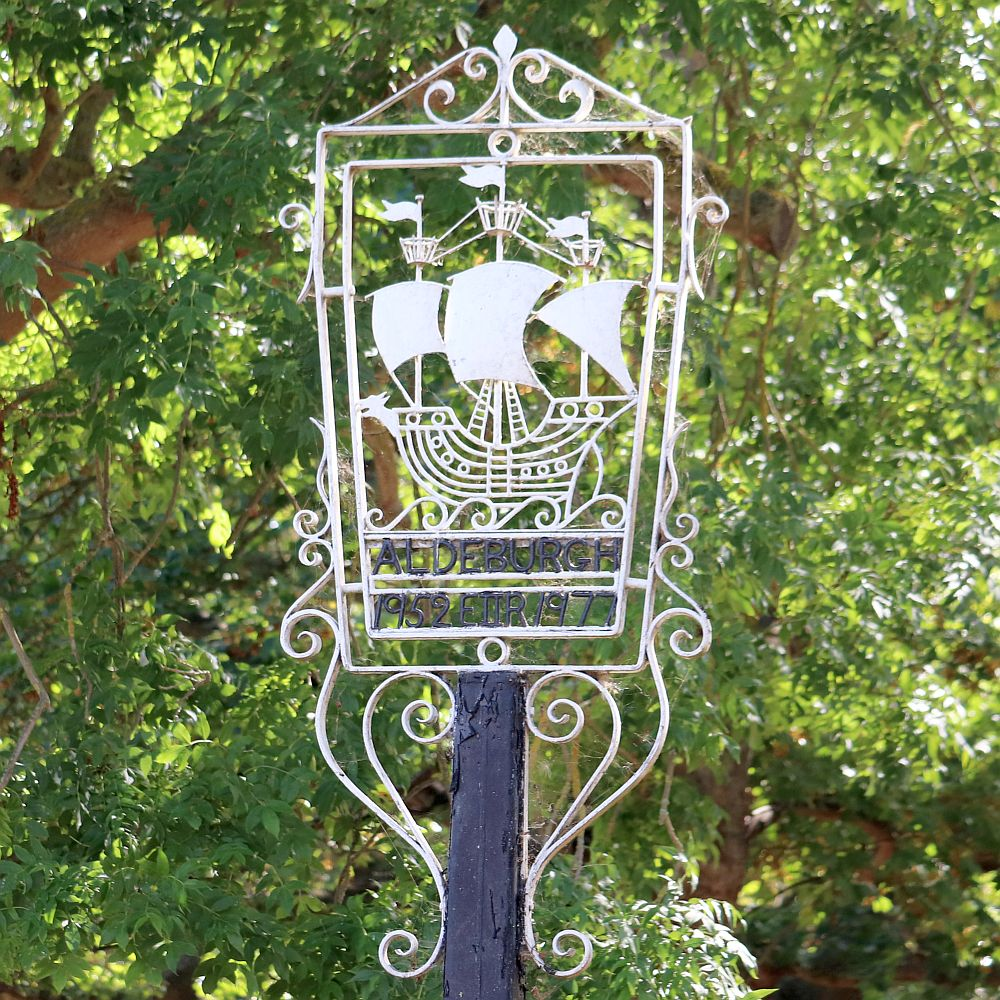
Aldeburgh Village sign

Aldeburgh is linked to the A12 by the A1094 road, at Friday Street in Benhall. The B1122 leads to Leiston.

There are direct bus services from the town to Saxmundham, Beccles, Halesworth, Woodbridge and Ipswich. Buses in the area are operated by First Eastern Counties and Borderbus.

Aldeburgh railway station opened in 1860 as the terminus of the Aldeburgh Branch Line from Saxmundham, but was closed in 1966 under the Beeching Axe. Nowadays, the nearest railway station is Saxmundham on the East Suffolk Line, approximately seven miles (eleven kilometres) away. Saxmundham station is served by hourly weekday services to Ipswich, for connections towards London Liverpool Street, and to Lowestoft for connections to Norwich.

== Landmarks ==
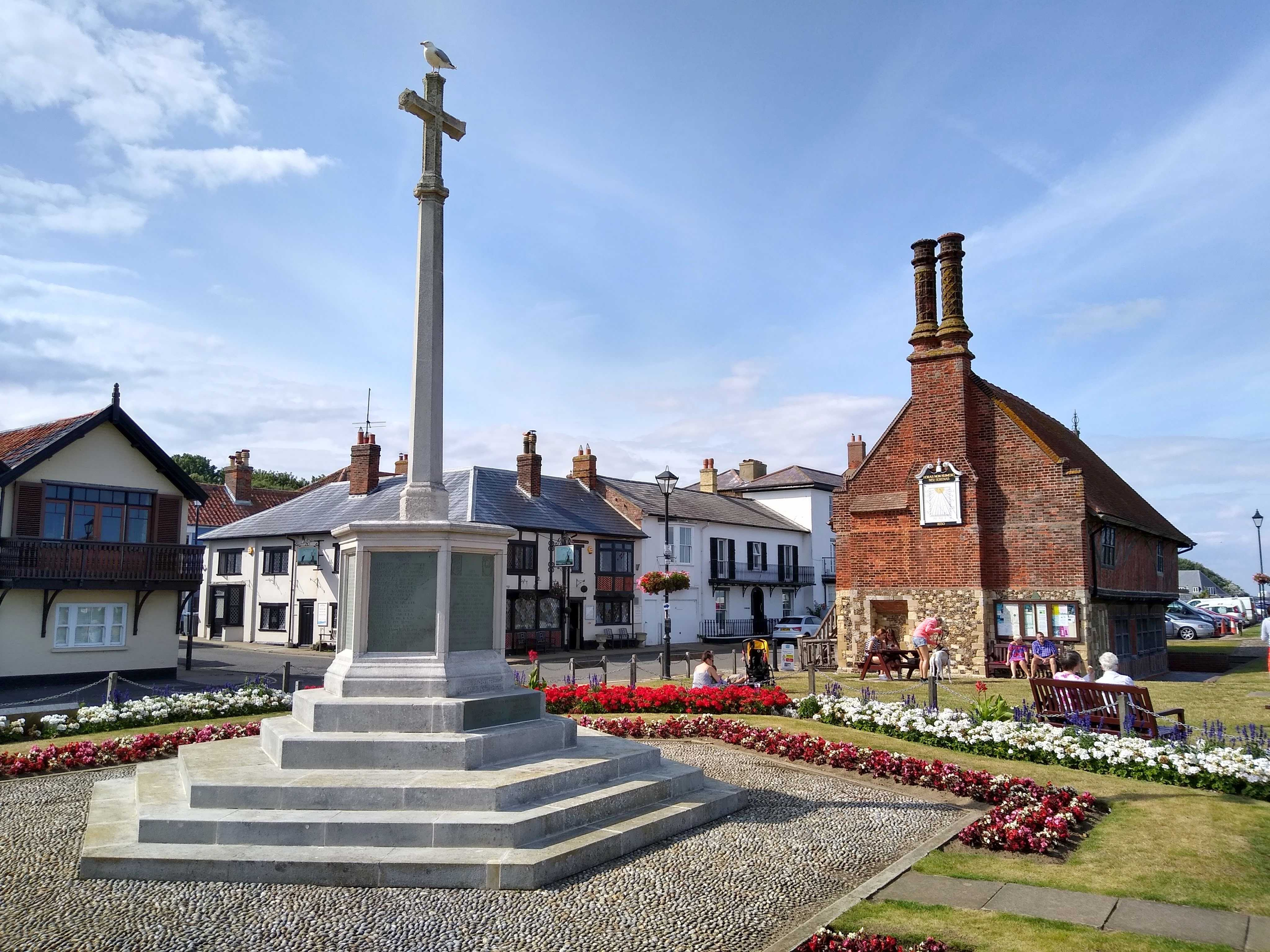
Aldeburgh War Memorial and Moot Hall in July 2019

=== Lifeboat station ===
The history of the Aldeburgh RNLI Lifeboat Station dates back to 1826 when a local lifeboat was first placed at nearby Sizewell by the Suffolk Association, crewed by men from Aldeburgh. Management was formally moved to Aldeburgh in 1851 and transferred to the RNLI shortly after in 1855.

Over two centuries, the station’s crews have faced severe trials and notable losses on service—beginning with Thomas Cable Jr. in November 1855, followed by a December 1859 capsizing that claimed crewmen Thomas Cable Sr., Philip Francis Green, and John Pearce. The station suffered its most devastating tragedy on December 7, 1899, when the Aldeburgh lifeboat overturned in heavy seas; seven crewmen—John Pearce Butcher, Charles Alfred Crisp, Thomas Morris, Walter George Ward, Herbert William "Dogger" Downing, James Miller Ward Jr., and Allen Arthur Easter (who died of his injuries three months later)—lost their lives.

During the Second World War, the station's lifeboats, including the Abdy Beauclerk and Lucy Lavers, served vital military roles, most famously taking part in the 1940 Dunkirk evacuation as part of the "Little Ships" fleet. Modernised in 1994 with an iconic post-modern boathouse directly on the beach, the station continues its long legacy of search and rescue operations along the treacherous North Sea coast.

=== Moot Hall ===
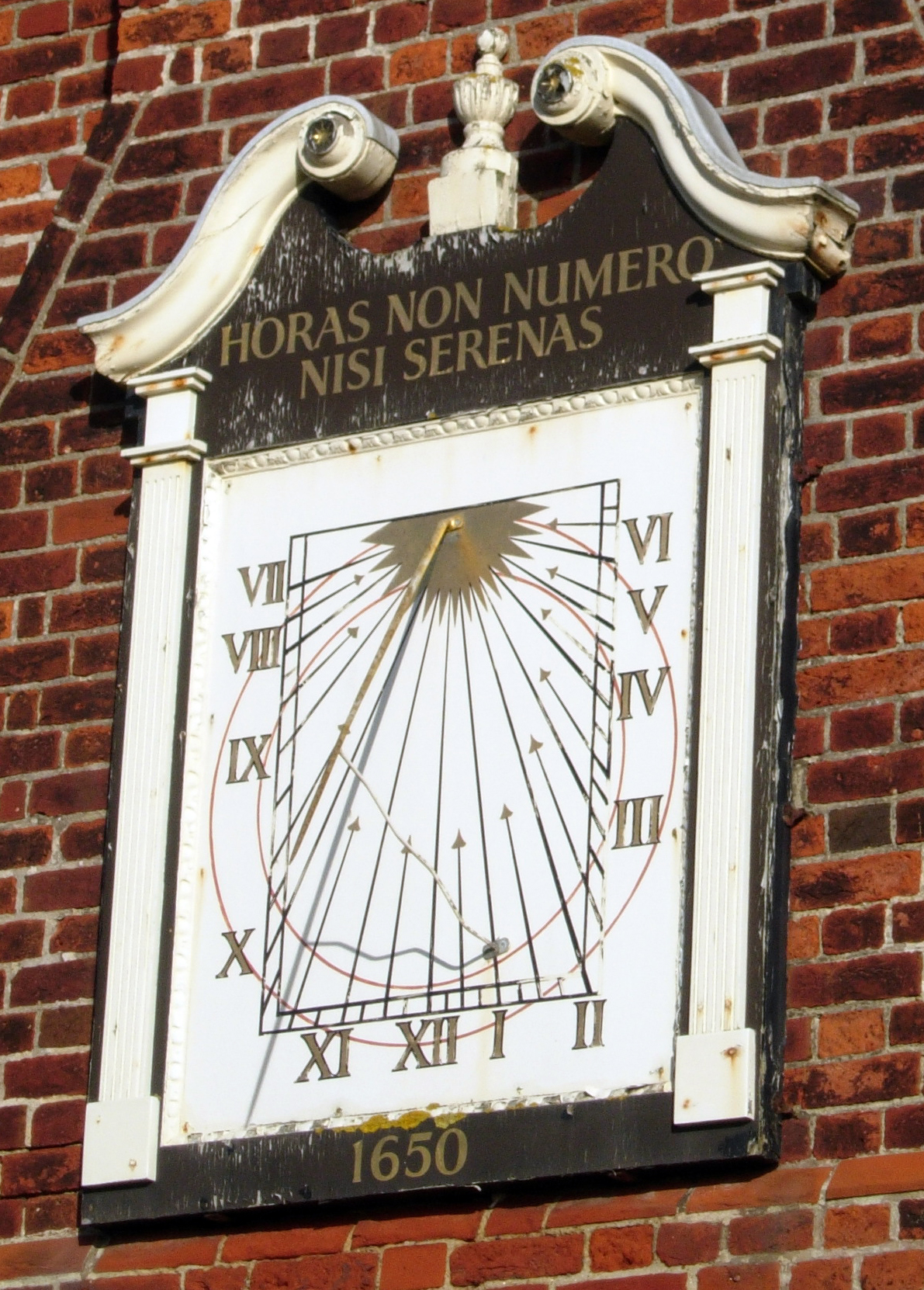
The sundial of the Moot Hall.

The Moot Hall is a Grade I listed timber-framed building, used for council meetings for more than 400 years. The Town Clerk's office remains there and it houses the local museum. It was built in about 1520 and altered in 1654. The brick and stone infilling of the ground floor is later. The hall was restored and the external staircase and gable ends were rebuilt in 1854–1855 under the direction of R. M. Phipson, chief architect of the Diocese of Norwich, in which Aldeburgh then stood. There are 64 other listed historic buildings and monuments in the town.

=== Martello Tower ===
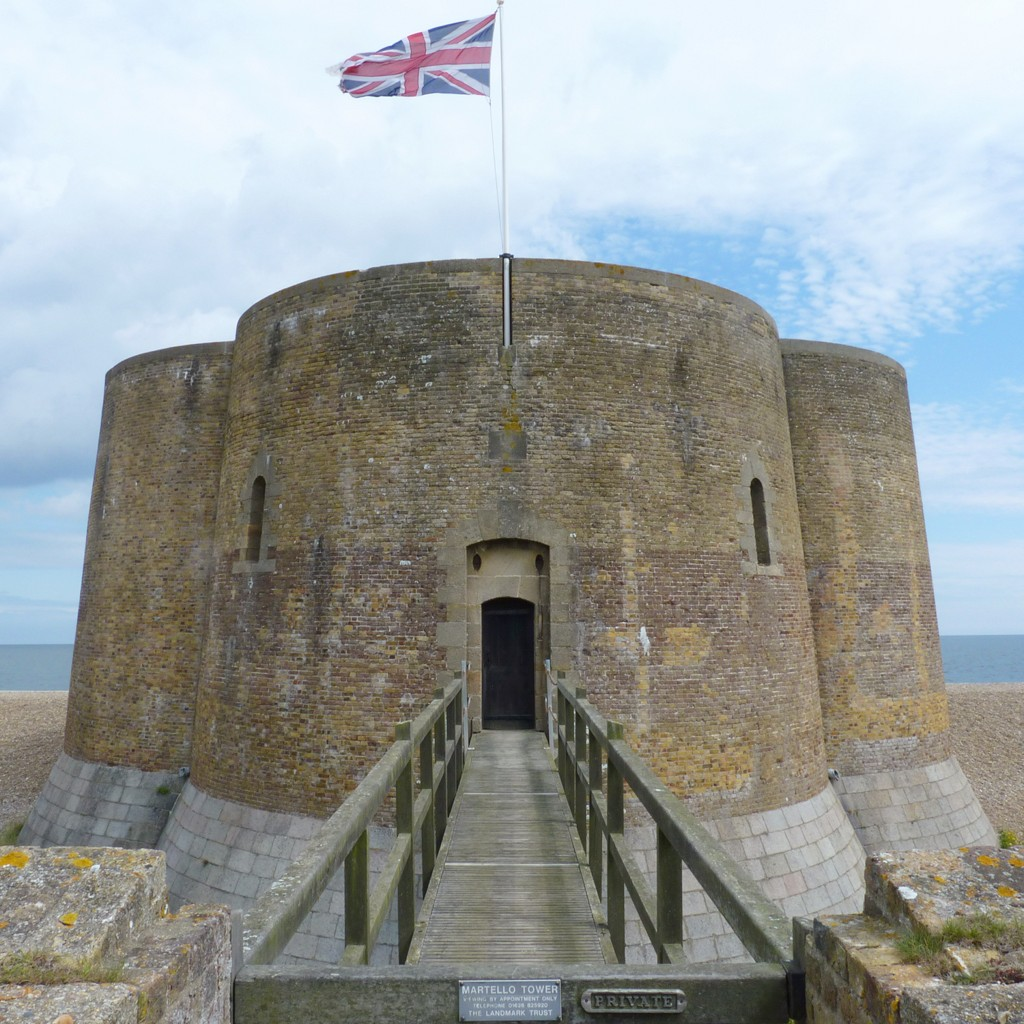
The Martello Tower viewed from across its bridge

A unique quatrefoil Martello Tower stands at the isthmus leading to the Orford Ness shingle spit. It is the largest and northernmost of 103 English defensive towers built in 1808–1812 to resist a threatened Napoleonic invasion. The Landmark Trust now runs it as a holiday home. From May 2015 to May 2016, an Antony Gormley statue was on display on the roof as part of his LAND art installation.

The Martello Tower is the only surviving building of the fishing village of Slaughden, which had been washed away by the North Sea by 1936. Near the Martello Tower at Slaughden Quay are barely visible remains of the fishing smack Ionia. It had become stuck in the treacherous mud of the River Alde and was then used as a houseboat. It was burnt in 1974 after becoming unsafe.

=== Fort Green Mill ===
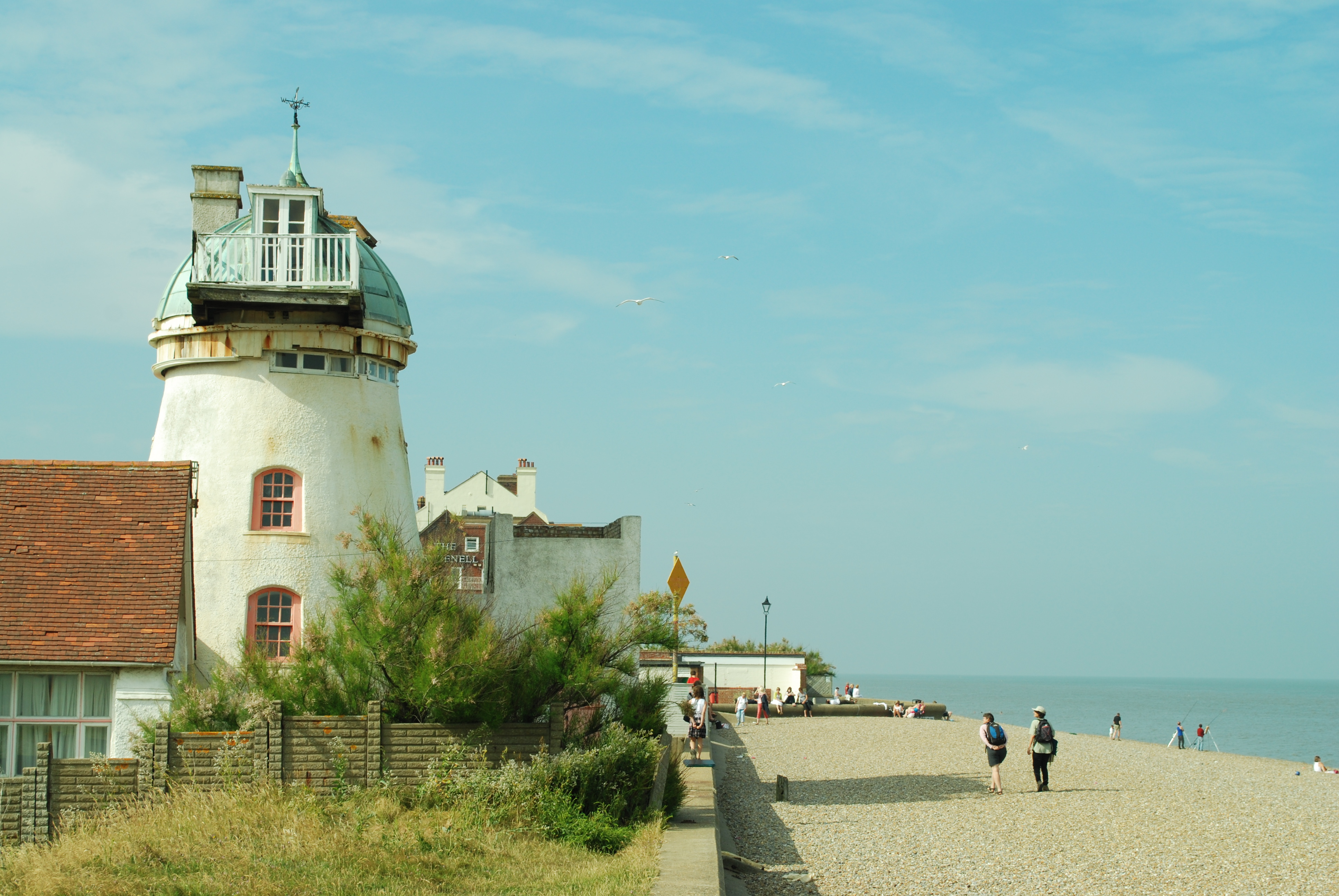
The converted Fort Green windmill

The four-storey windmill at the southern end of the town was built in 1824 and converted into a dwelling in 1902.

=== WW2 tank trap ===
A WW2 tank trap can be seen next to Slaughden Road.

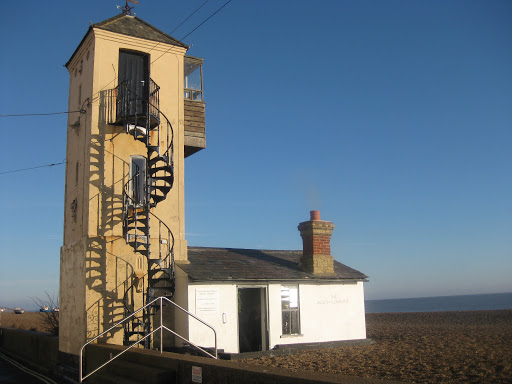
The Aldeburgh Beach Lookout, built c. 1830

=== Aldeburgh Beach Lookout ===
The Aldeburgh Beach Lookout is a historic landmark on the Aldeburgh seafront. Grade II listed, it was built in about 1830 as a lookout tower to assist or plunder shipping along the hazardous North Sea coast. The South African writer Laurens van der Post did his writing there for more than thirty years. Since 2010, the lookout has provided an artistic space for residents and tourists, with Antony Gormley sculptures on display between the lookout and the sea.

=== Scallop ===
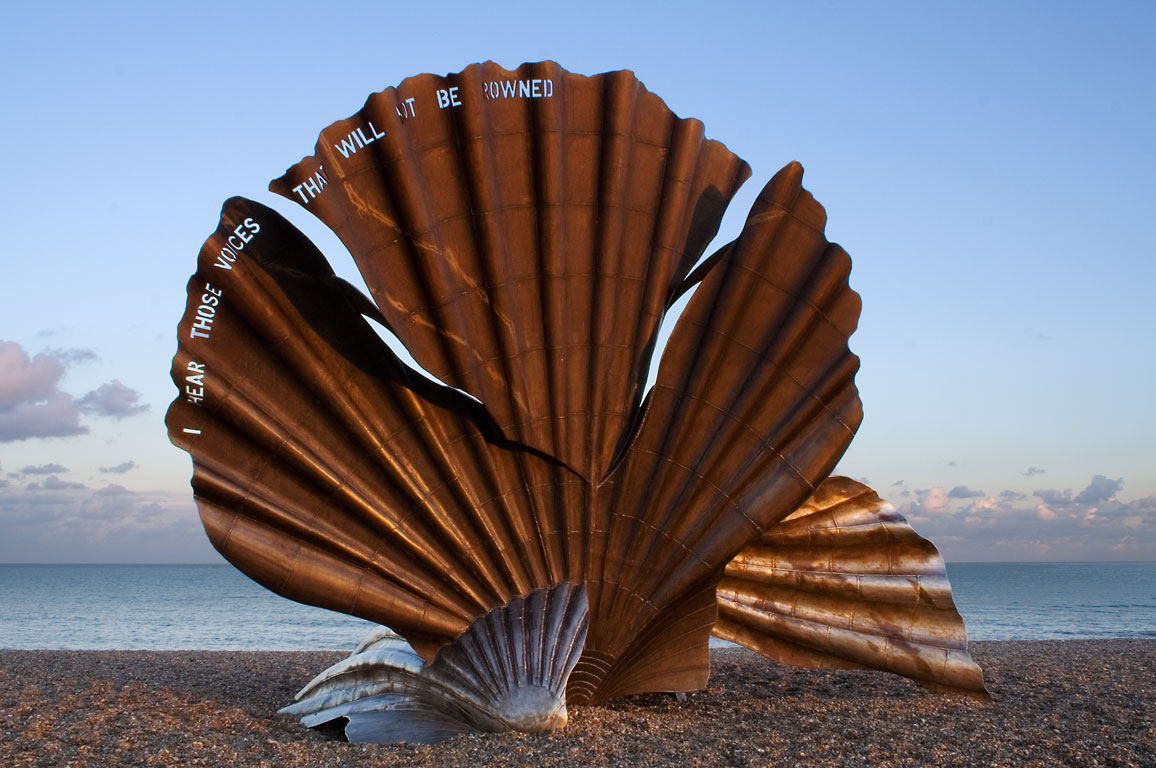
Scallop

On Aldeburgh's beach, a short distance north of the town centre, stands a sculpture called Scallop, dedicated to Benjamin Britten, who would walk along the beach in the afternoons. Created from stainless steel by the Suffolk-based artist Maggi Hambling, it stands 15 feet (4.6 metres) tall and was unveiled in November 2003. The piece is made up of two interlocking scallop shells, each broken, the upright shell being pierced by the words, "I hear those voices that will not be drowned," taken from Britten's opera Peter Grimes. The sculpture is meant to be enjoyed both visually and in a tactile way: people are encouraged to sit on it and watch the sea.

The upright portion of the shell splits into three sections positioned at different angles. The positioning of these effects a visual transformation, depending on the vantage point from which the sculpture is viewed.

The sculpture is controversial in the local area, with some local residents considering it "spoils the beach". It has been vandalised with graffiti and paint on thirteen occasions. There have been petitions both for its removal and retention.

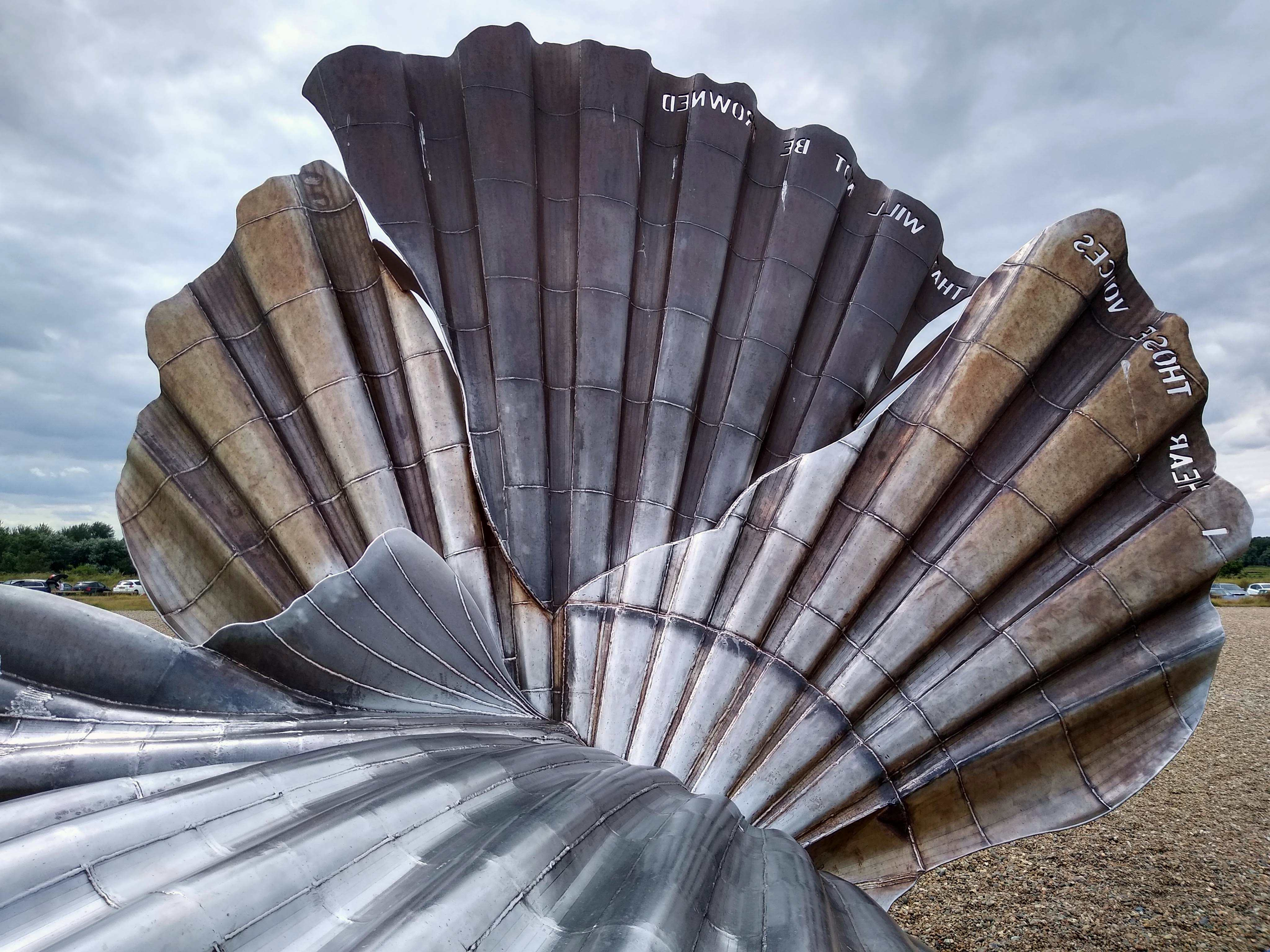
Detail of Scallop viewed from the sea in July 2019

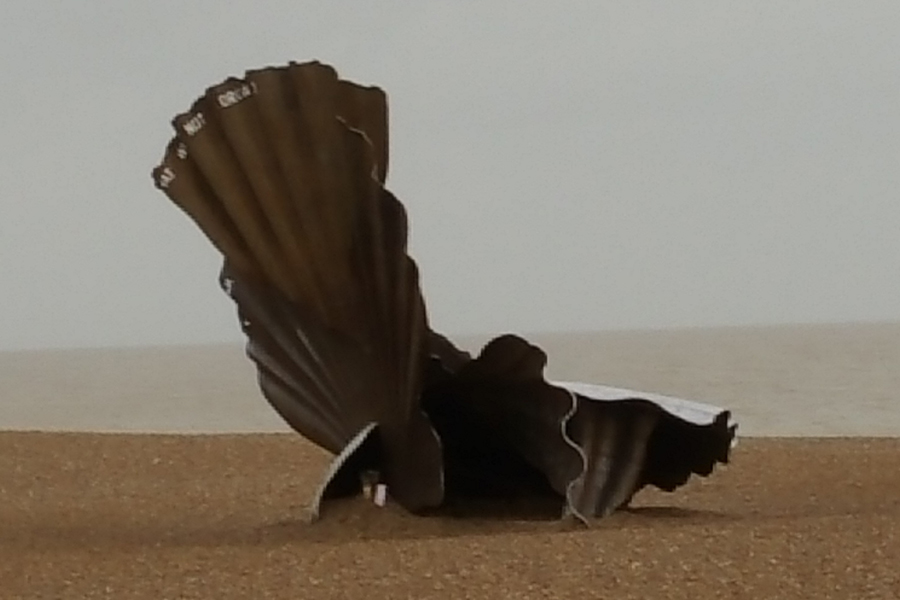
Scallop, by Maggie Hambling, as viewed from the path leaving Aldeburgh in the direction of Thorpeness, from which vantage it takes the shape of a seabird

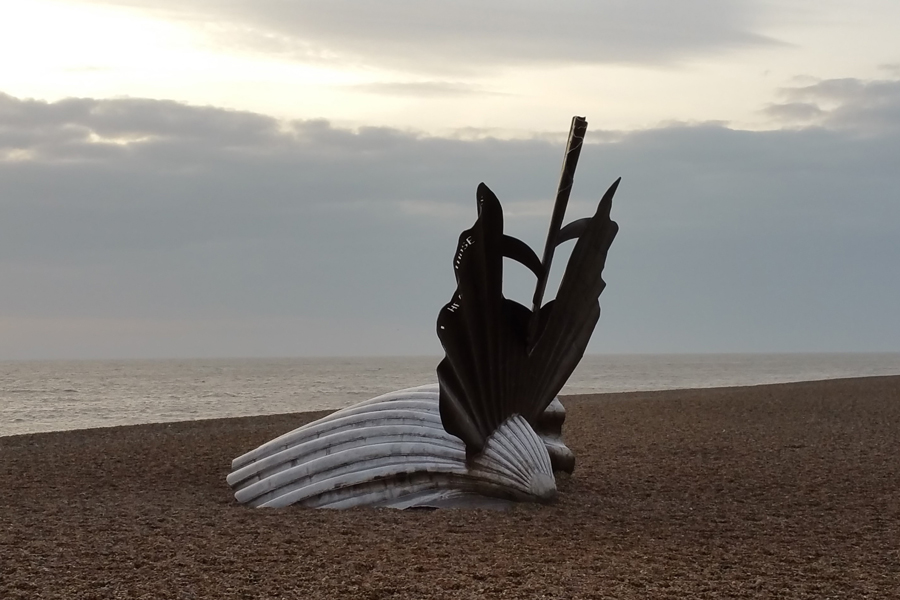
Scallop, viewed from the path between Aldeburgh and Thorpeness, looking back towards Aldeburgh, from which vantage the sculpture takes the shape of two men in a boat, referencing a central incident from the opera Peter Grimes

== First World War ==
During the First World War, Aldeburgh served as a crucial coastal defence and maritime observation outpost along the North Sea. The town's exposed geography made it susceptible to German naval raids and Zeppelin reconnaissance, prompting early defensive installations including trench systems, barbed-wire beach barriers, and coastal artillery units. The 4th Battalion, Suffolk Regiment, alongside locally raised detachments of the Suffolk Volunteer Regiment, maintained garrisons along the coast to guard against enemy landings and manage sea-watching posts.

The area also became significant in early military aviation with the establishment of Aldeburgh Airfield (locally known as Hazlewood Aerodrome) in 1915. Initially operating as a satellite night-landing ground for the Royal Naval Air Service (RNAS) station at Great Yarmouth, it expanded in August 1918 to host the Anti-Submarine Inshore Patrol Observers School. Flying specialised aircraft such as the Blackburn Kangaroo, Airco DH.6, and Royal Aircraft Factory B.E.2, service pilots flew regular anti-submarine patrols off the Suffolk coastline to protect vital North Sea shipping lanes. Pilots notably used the white sand bunkers of the nearby Aldeburgh Golf Course as visual navigation markers to locate the grass runway.

The conflict inflicted a significant human toll on the small coastal community. Dozens of local residents served across the armed forces and the Royal Naval Reserve, manning merchant ships, mine-sweeping trawlers, and front-line trench units. In total, 84 men and one woman from Aldeburgh lost their lives during the war, including local servicemen such as Second Lieutenant Reginald Amherst Pargeter of the Suffolk Regiment and Deckhand Reuben William Wood of the Royal Naval Reserve. The end of hostilities in November 1918 was met with major civic celebrations outside the historic Moot Hall, culminating in the dedication of the town's War Memorial on Memorial Green in January 1920.

== Second World War ==
During the Second World War, Aldeburgh’s vulnerable position along the East Anglian coastline placed it on the front lines of Great Britain's home defence. Following the fall of France in 1940, the town was heavily fortified against potential German invasion with pillboxes, anti-tank blocks, minefields, and scaffolding along its shingle beaches. Coastal security was primarily maintained by regular Army units stationed locally—including the 5th Battalion, Royal Berkshire Regiment—alongside local civilian reservists. Men ineligible for front-line military service joined the 8th (Leiston) Battalion of the Suffolk Home Guard, patrolling strategic points, manning anti-aircraft batteries, and operating armoured trains along the branch railway line between Leiston and Aldeburgh.

Beyond coastal defense, Aldeburgh played a direct role in major military operations, most notably Operation Dynamo—the 1940 evacuation of the British Expeditionary Force from Dunkirk. In late May 1940, two of Aldeburgh's Royal National Lifeboat Institution (RNLI) lifeboats, the Abdy Beauclerk and the Lucy Lavers, were requisitioned by the Royal Navy. Transported down to Ramsgate and manned by naval crews, these vessels joined the historic fleet of "Little Ships" that ventured across the English Channel under fire, helping to ferry thousands of trapped Allied soldiers from shallow beach waters to offshore warships.

The town was also subject to air raids by Luftwaffe bombers navigating the North Sea coastline. A devastating raid occurred on December 15, 1942, when low-flying German aircraft bombed the High Street. The attack destroyed the General Post Office and damaged nearby buildings, resulting in 11 fatalities and dozens of injuries. Among the service personnel killed in the strike were Privates George Brooks, Harold Benjamin Hartop, and Leonard Edward Nash of the 5th Battalion, Royal Berkshire Regiment. Despite the destruction, Aldeburgh remained a vital coastal staging post and training zone up until the Allied invasion of Normandy in 1944.

== Notable residents ==
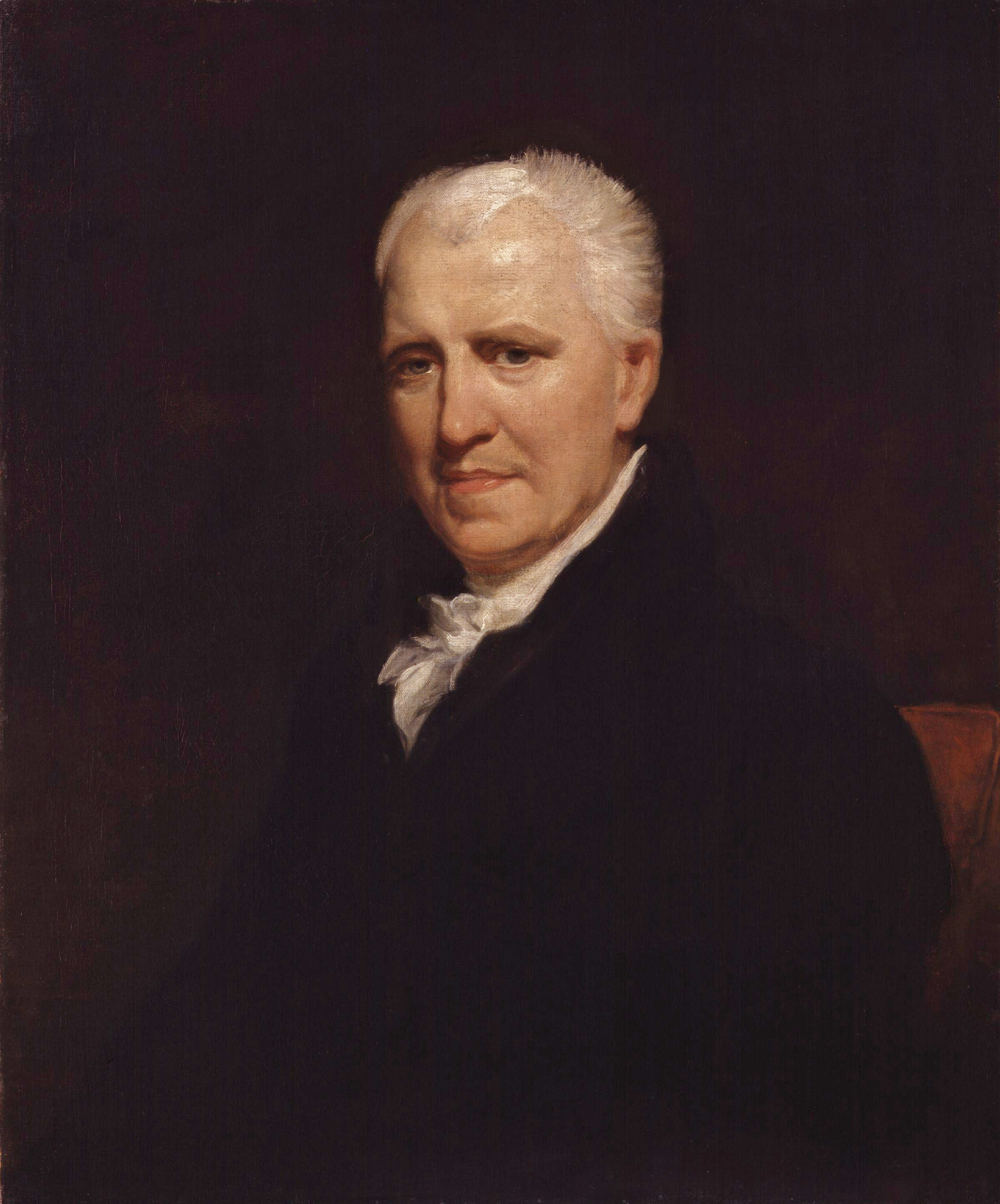
George Crabbe, 1818

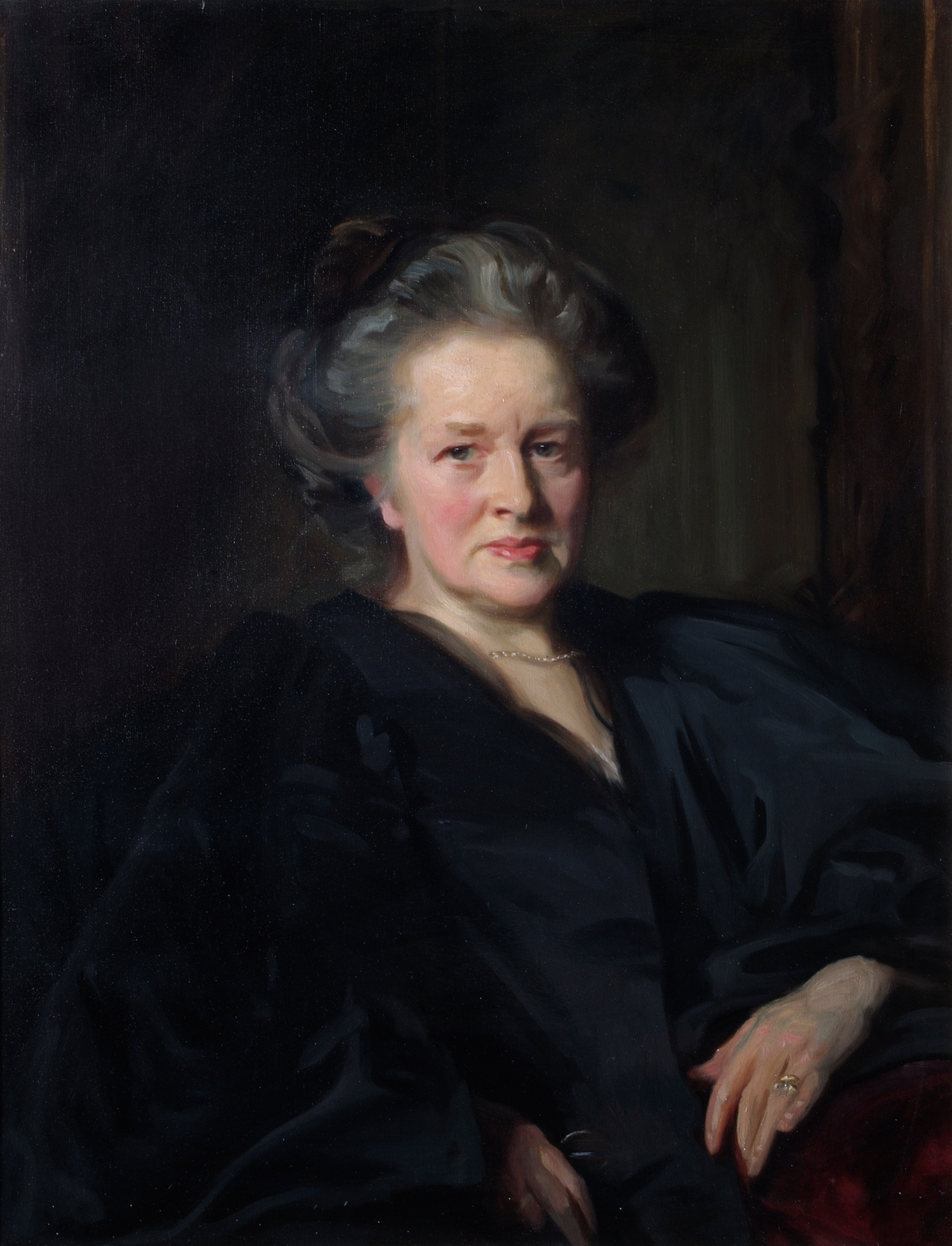
Elizabeth Garrett Anderson, 1900

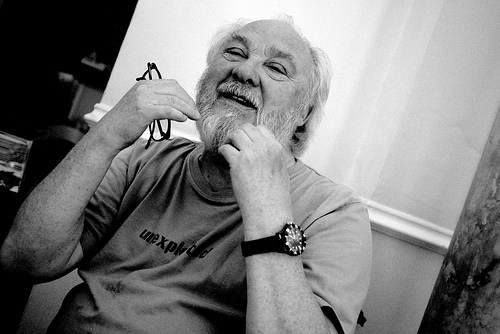
Peter Sinfield, 2010

- Henry Johnson (c. 1659–1719), the "greatest shipbuilder and shipowner of his day" and MP for Aldeburgh, 1689–1719
- George Crabbe (1754–1832), poet, was born in Aldeburgh, which features in his poems The Village and The Borough. The latter concerns a fisherman named Peter Grimes, on whose story Benjamin Britten's opera of that name was based.
- John Liptrot Hatton (1809–1886) was an internationally celebrated English composer, conductor, pianist and singer who stayed in Aldeburgh for some time and wrote, for the place he loved, an Aldeburgh Te Deum.
- Elizabeth Garrett Anderson (1836–1917) was the first woman to qualify as a physician and surgeon in Britain, co-founder of first hospital staffed by women, first female dean of a British medical school, first female Doctor of Medicine in France, first woman in Britain elected to a school board, and as Mayor of Aldeburgh, first female mayor and magistrate in Britain. She is buried in the town churchyard
- Annie Hall Cudlip, (1838–1918) writer, novelist and short story writer, was born in Aldeburgh.
- Agnes Garrett (1845–1935), suffragist and interior designer, founded the Ladies Dwellings Company.
- Dame Millicent Fawcett (1847–1929), suffragist, feminist and writer, was born in Aldeburgh, where she set her one novel, Janet Doncaster.
- M. R. James (1862–1936), author, set a story, "A Warning to the Curious", in "Seaburgh" (Aldeburgh). Landmarks such as the Martello tower and White Lion Hotel feature.
- Lois Austen-Leigh (1883–1968), writer and war volunteer, moved to Aldeburgh (Cob House) with her sister Honor in the 1920s and lived out her days there
- Joan Cross (1900–1993), soprano and theatre director who created several Britten opera roles, is buried in the town churchyard.
- Gerry Fiennes (1906–1985), railway manager and author, was Mayor of Aldeburgh in 1976.
- Imogen Holst (1907–1984), composer, conductor, teacher, assistant to Benjamin Britten, and co-director of the Aldeburgh Festival from 1956 to 1977, lived in Aldeburgh from 1952 and is buried in the town churchyard.
- H. T. Cadbury-Brown (1913–2009), architect.
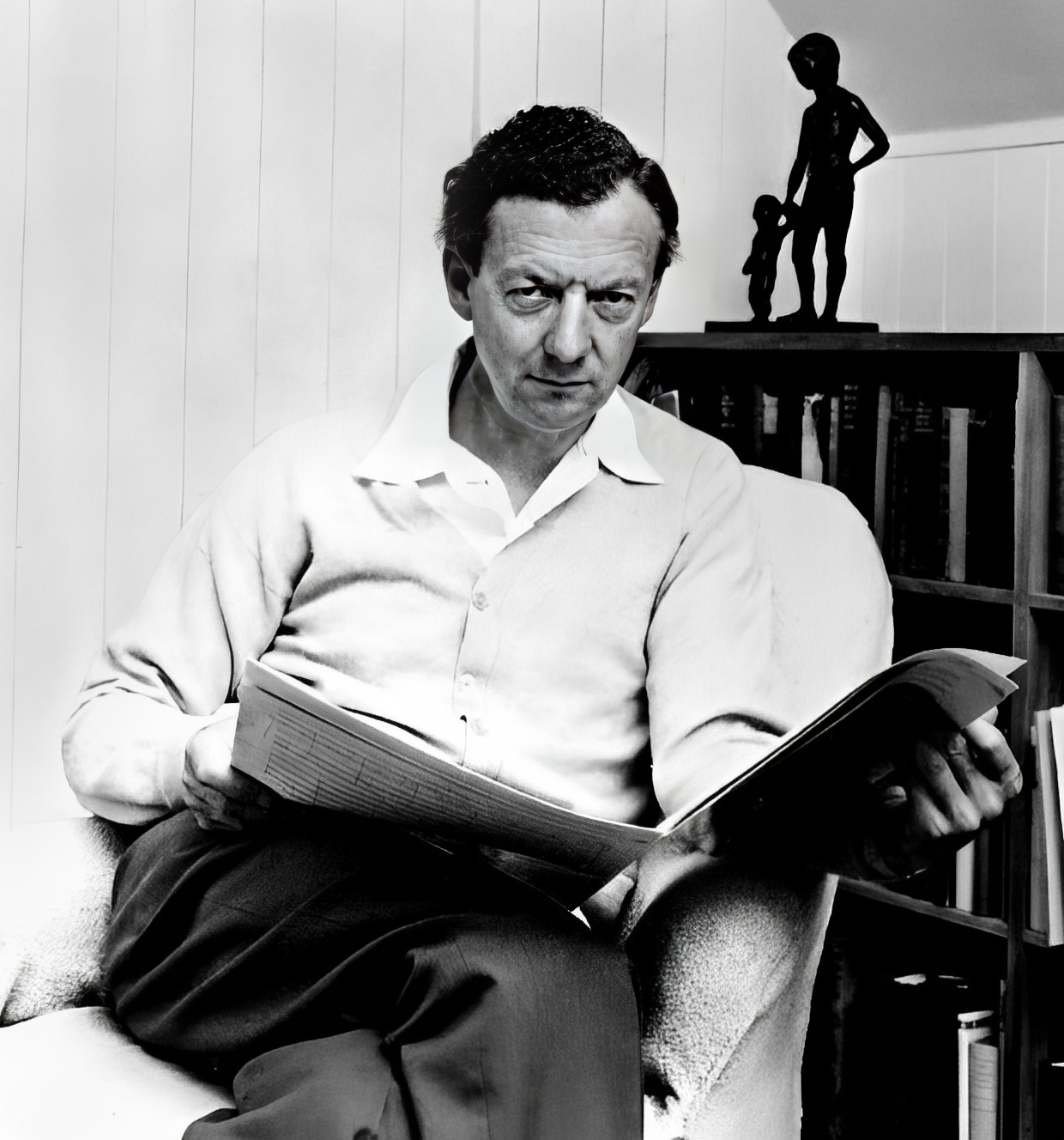
- Benjamin Britten, 1968
  Benjamin Britten (1913–1976) moved to the town in 1942. He, Eric Crozier (1914–1994) and Peter Pears (1910–1986) founded the Aldeburgh Festival and Aldeburgh Music Club. He moved with Pears into The Red House in 1957. They lie side by side in the town churchyard.
- Ian Tait (1926–2013) was a GP in Aldeburgh (from 1959) and one of the founders of the Aldeburgh Poetry Festival; he is known for his work in the modernisation of general practice.
- Ruth Rendell (1930–2015), author of thrillers and psychological murder mysteries, created Chief Inspector Wexford.
- Reverend Sandy Millar (born 1939), once vicar of Holy Trinity Brompton and co-founder of the Alpha course, lives in Aldeburgh.
- Francis Carnwath (1940–2020), deputy director of the Tate gallery 1990–1994, and co-founder of the Aldeburgh Beach Lookout.
- Sue Lloyd (1939–2011), model and actress, played Barbara Hunter in Crossroads.
- Christine Truman (born 1941), Grand Slam tennis event winner, lives in Aldeburgh.
- Malcolm Bowie (1943–2007), Master of Christ's College, Cambridge, 2002–2006.
- Peter Sinfield (1943–2024), songwriter with the progressive rock act King Crimson.
- Craig Brown (satirist) (born 1957), journalist, author, Private Eye satirist, is a resident.
- Cevanne Horrocks-Hopayian (living), composer, was born in the area and lives in Aldeburgh, on the border with Thorpeness.
- Roy Keane (born 1971), footballer, became an Aldeburgh resident in 2009 on taking over as manager of Ipswich Town.
- Miranda Raison (born 1977), actress, has a weekend cottage in Aldeburgh and belongs to Aldeburgh Golf Club.
- Isabella Summers (born 1980), songwriter, producer and remixer (Florence and the Machine), is from Aldeburgh.

== Culture ==
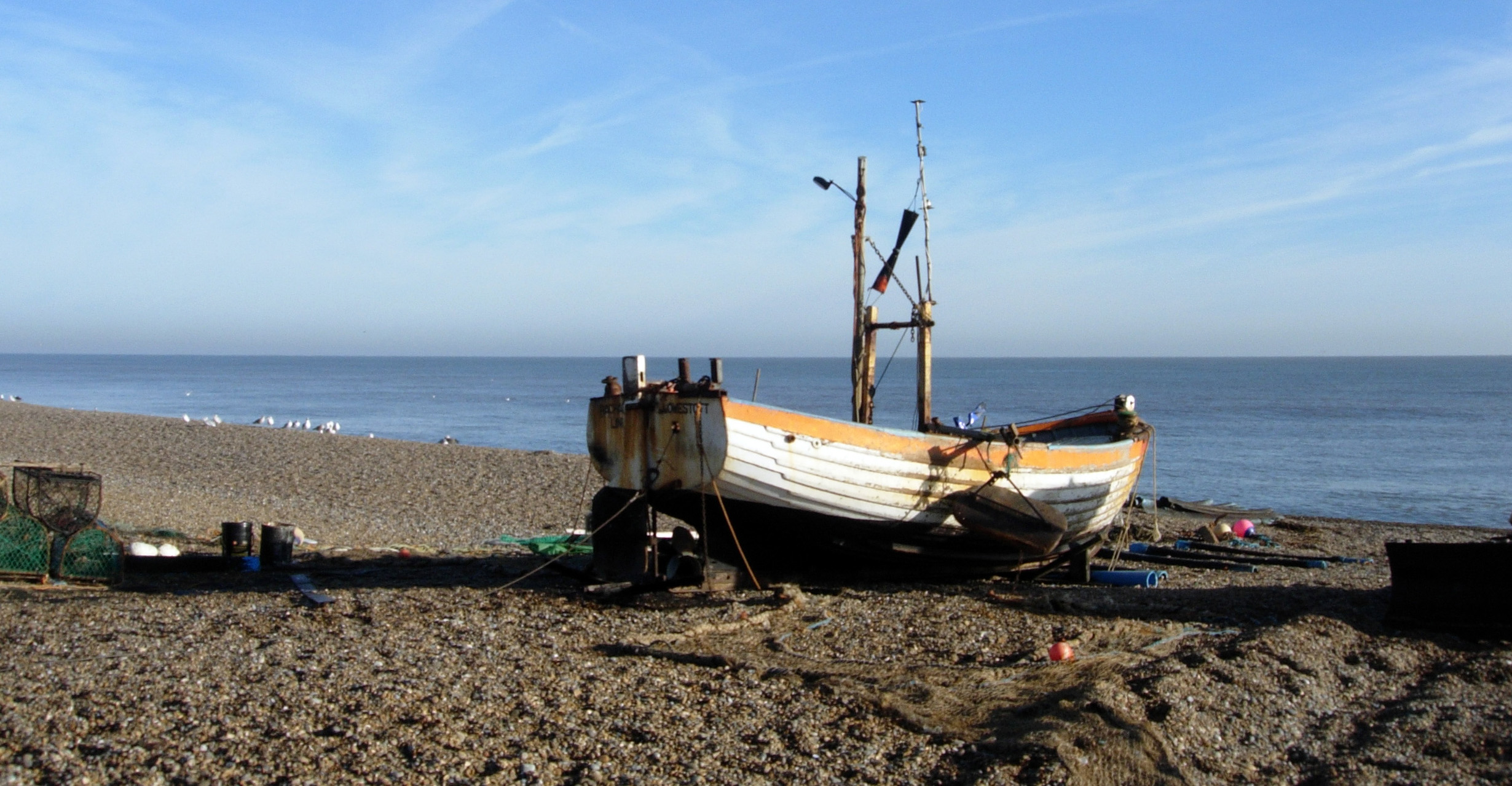
Coastline at Aldeburgh.

Outside the town, the Snape Maltings is the venue for the Aldeburgh Festival held every June.

Aldeburgh Music Club, founded by Benjamin Britten and Peter Pears in 1952, has since evolved into one of East Anglia's leading choirs, with about 100 members and more than 120 supporting patrons. It rehearses from early September to late May each year and holds three major performances, two of them at Snape Maltings Concert Hall.

The annual Aldeburgh Carnival in August has been held at least since 1892 and possibly since 1832, when "Ye Olde Marine Regatta" was mentioned. The focal point today is a carnival procession featuring locals and visitors dressed in homemade costumes and on floats, often with a topical or local theme. In the evening, a parade with Chinese lanterns and a firework display are traditional. The procession has been led for more than thirty years by Chief Marshal Trevor Harvey, also a Carnival Committee member for more than fifty years.

The Suffolk Craft Society hold an annual themed exhibition in the Peter Pears Gallery over July and August, showing the work of its members.

The town of Aldeburgh, or "Owlbarrow", is the setting of a series of children's illustrated books centred on Orlando (The Marmalade Cat) written by Kathleen Hale, who spent holidays in the town. Many illustrations in the books feature landmarks in the town, including the Moot Hall. The town features in the 1989 thriller Cross of Fire by novelist Colin Forbes, as do the nearby villages of Dunwich and Snape Maltings. James Herbert based his book The Jonah in the area, using several names represented in the local area for characters, including Slaughden.

Aldeburgh (spelt there Aldborough) is the location of a key scene in Wilkie Collins's novel No Name, where Captain Wragge and Magdalen Vanstone enact their conspiracy against Noel Vanstone and Mrs Lecount. The town's Martello Tower is (1862) mentioned as a landmark. Aldeburgh also features in the M. R. James story A Warning to the Curious as "Seaburgh" and in Joseph Freeman's novel Arcadia Lodge. The Maggi Hambling sculpture appears in an early scene, as do various other landmarks.

=== Fishing ===
Aldeburgh is notable for its line fishing for amateur anglers; it has been called "a great spot for bass, flounders, sole, dabs, cod, whiting and eels". However, the East Anglian Daily Times says "countless years of commercial over-fishing has all but destroyed many of our [Suffolk's] offshore sea fisheries" and traditional, sustainable inshore fishing is under threat, with likely knock-on effects for the coastal community. Local fishermen featured in the "Fish Fight" campaigns of Hugh Fearnley-Whittingstall and Greenpeace, supporting small-scale inshore fishermen.

=== Rugby ===
Aldeburgh is home to Aldeburgh and Thorpeness Rugby Club, based at Kings Field in Aldeburgh. The club runs an adult team in the Eastern Counties Leagues, an Under-15s team, Midi/Mini rugby, and Women's touch rugby. The club started out in nearby Thorpeness and moved in 2015 to work with Aldeburgh Town Council and Aldeburgh Community Centre.

== Media ==
Local news and television programmes are provided by BBC East and ITV Anglia. Television signals are received from the Tacolneston TV transmitter and the local relay transmitter situated north-east of the town.

Local radio stations are BBC Radio Suffolk, Heart East, Greatest Hits Radio Ipswich & Suffolk and Alde and Blyth Community Radio (ABC), a community radio station.

The town is served by the local newspaper the East Anglian Daily Times.

== Other amenities ==
These include Aldeburgh Cottage Hospital, a traditional English cottage hospital, the Aldeburgh Library, which also relies on volunteers, and the Aldeburgh cinema, which puts on films and cultural events.

== Arms ==
Coat of arms of Aldeburgh

Notes
Granted 5 February 1951.
Escutcheon
Azure on water in base an ancient ship of three masts in full sail a ladder affixed to the side amidships Proper the mainsail charged with a lion rampant the fore and aft sails and pennons each charged with a cross Gules.
