= Andrew Carnwath =

British banker

Sir Andrew Hunter Carnwath KCVO DL (26 October 1909 – 29 December 1995) was a British banker. He was managing director, Baring Brothers & Co. Ltd, 1955–1974; and chairman of the London Multinational Bank, 1971–1974.

He was educated at Eton College. Sir Andrew was awarded an honorary doctorate by the University of Essex in 1983.

He had six children, including Francis Carnwath, deputy director of the Tate Gallery 1990–1994, and Robert Carnwath, Lord Carnwath of Notting Hill.
