= Caroline Wiseman =

British art dealer and author

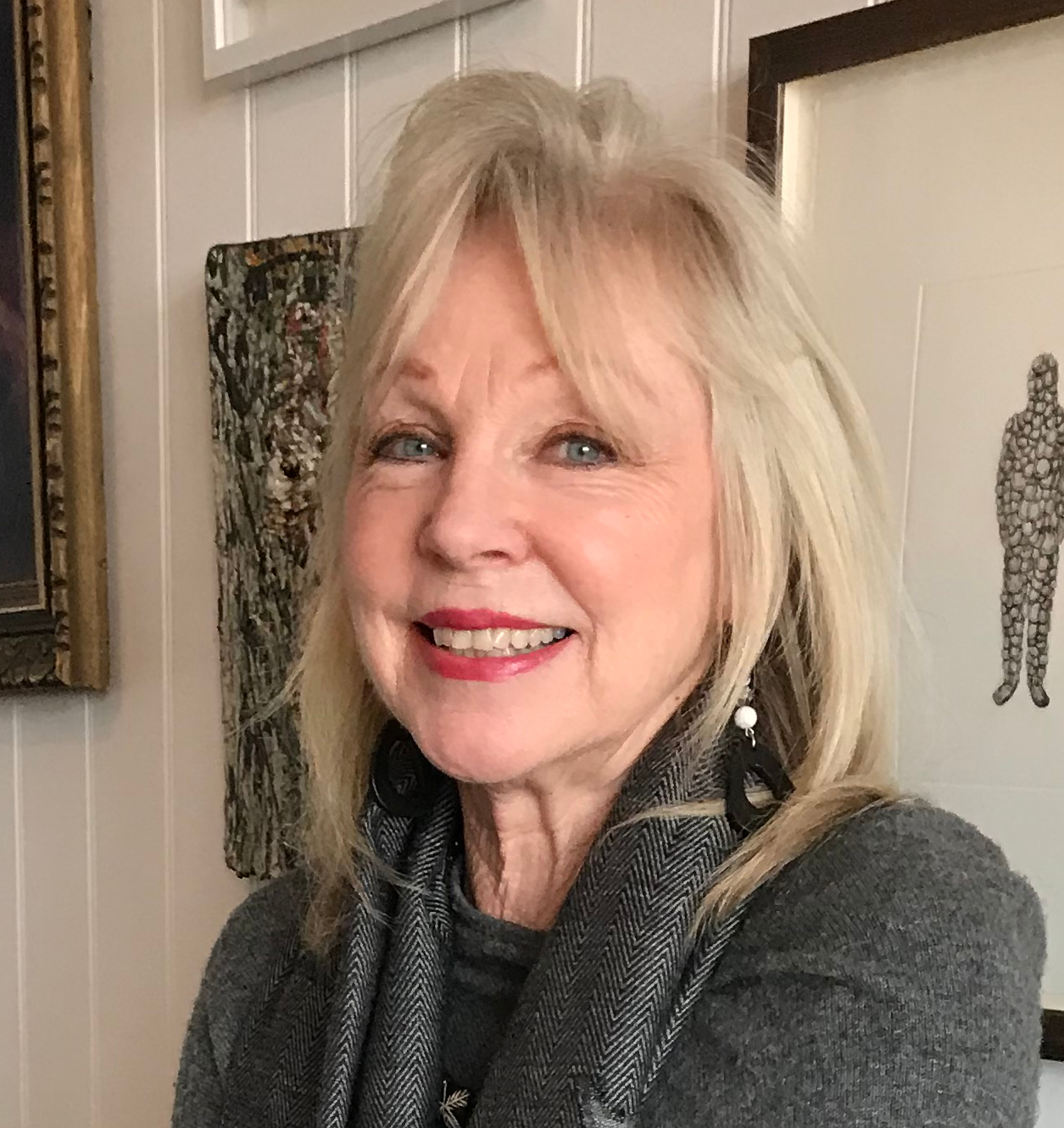
- Born: 12 March 1954 (age 71)
- Occupations: Art Dealer, Author
- Spouses: Garth Wiseman (m. 1986; sep. 2003) Francis Carnwath (m. 2004; died 2020)

Caroline Wiseman (born 12 March 1954) is a British art dealer and author. She has had success selling prints by old masters such as Picasso, Matisse, and Braque and modern artists such as Howard Hodgkin, Patrick Heron, Elisabeth Frink, and Terry Frost.

== Career ==
Wiseman qualified as a barrister in 1976 before becoming an art dealer. She is a Senior Visiting Fellow at the University of Suffolk, an Ambassador for The Princes Trust, and a Fellow of the Royal Society of the Arts. Her books include Elisabeth Frink Original Prints Catalogue Raisonne, 1998, Modern Art Now, from Conception to Consumption, 2006, and The Leonardo Question, 2009.

Wiseman previously served as a trustee of Paintings in Hospitals, a charity which loans works of art to hospitals. In 2010 she and her partner Francis Carnwath founded the Aldeburgh Beach Lookout as a centre for the public to view and discuss modern art and ideas. Since then, the Lookout has hosted exhibitions by many international artists, philosophers and thinkers.

Also in 2010, Wiseman's The Leonardo Question, telling the story of modern art through the voices of influential artists and asking the question, "what makes good art?", was adapted for stage and presented at the Edinburgh Fringe Festival. Reviewers felt the theme was laboured and had little depth, but that the piece was "spirited" and had "wit and charm."

In February 2021, Wiseman became the focus of a dispute over the planning permission of a series of sculptures by Antony Gormley.

== Personal life ==
She married Garth Wiseman in 1986 and their triplet sons were born in 1990. They separated and Wiseman began living with Francis Carnwath in 2004. Carnwath died in 2020.

== Selected works ==
- Elisabeth Frink Original Prints Catalogue Raisonne, 1998
- Modern Art Now, from Conception to Consumption, 2006
- The Leonardo Question, 2009
