= Francis Carnwath =

British banker (1940–2020)

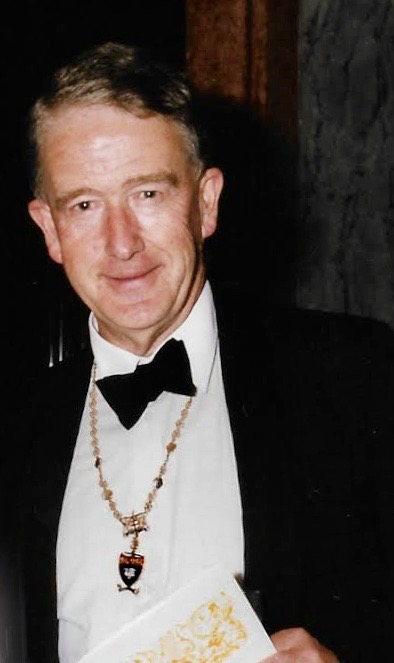
- Francis Carnwath as Master of the Musicians' Company
- Born: 26 May 1940; London
- Died: 26 June 2020 (aged 80)
- Education: Eton College (Oppidan Scholar), and Trinity College, Cambridge
- Awards: Commander of the Order of the British Empire

Francis Anthony Armstrong Carnwath CBE (26 May 1940 – 26 June 2020) was a British banker and chairman of many arts and heritage organisations.

== Biography ==
Francis Carnwath began his career with Barings Bank, rising to become a director. Then he served as deputy director of the Tate Gallery 1990-1994 where he played a leading role in the identification of the Bankside Power Station as the home of the new Tate Modern gallery. In 1995 he became acting director of the National Lottery Heritage Fund. He then served as Director of the newly created Greenwich Foundation for the Royal Naval College from 1997 to 2002, with the task of securing financial stability and readying the Palace buildings, vacated by the Royal Navy, for occupation by Greenwich University and Trinity College of Music.

Alongside this, Carnwath was chairman of several charitable organisations. He was Trustee and later Deputy Chairman of Shelter 1968–1976; Treasurer of Voluntary Service Overseas 1979–1984; Chairman of the Spitalfields Historic Buildings Trust 1984–2000; Chairman of the English Heritage Blue Plaque Panel 1995–2002; Deputy Chairman of the Whitechapel Gallery 1994–2000; Master of the Worshipful Company of Musicians 1995–1996; Chairman of the Musgrave Kinley Outsider Trust 1999–2011; Treasurer of the Charles Darwin Trust 1999–2005; Trustee of the Royal Armouries Museum 2000–2007; Trustee then Chairman of the Spitalfields Festival 2003–2010; Chairman of the National Trust Architectural Panel 2004–2012; Chairman of the Yorkshire Sculpture Park 2004–2012; Chairman of Thames 21 2004–2015.

He was Trustee and later Chairman of the Phillimore Estates, London, from 1983 to 2015.

He was appointed a CBE in 1997.

== Personal life ==
He was the eldest of six children of the banker Sir Andrew Carnwath, KCVO, DL and his first wife Kathleen Marianne (née Armstrong). A younger brother is Robert Carnwath, Lord Carnwath of Notting Hill, a former Justice of the Supreme Court of the United Kingdom.

Carnwath married Penelope Rose (they later separated); they had two daughters and one son.

In 2010, Carnwath and his partner Caroline Wiseman founded the Aldeburgh Beach Lookout, a visual arts venue in Aldeburgh, Suffolk.
