= Snape, Suffolk =

Village in Suffolk, England

Coordinates: 52.17°N 1.5°E

Snape
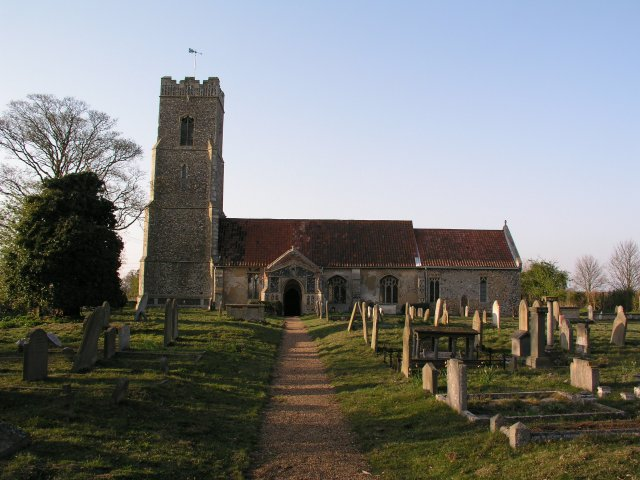
- St John the Baptist, Snape

- Location within Suffolk
- Population: 611 (2011)
- Shire county: Suffolk
- Region: East
- Country: England
- Sovereign state: United Kingdom
- Post town: Saxmundham
- Postcode district: IP17
- Dialling code: 01728
- UK Parliament: Suffolk Coastal

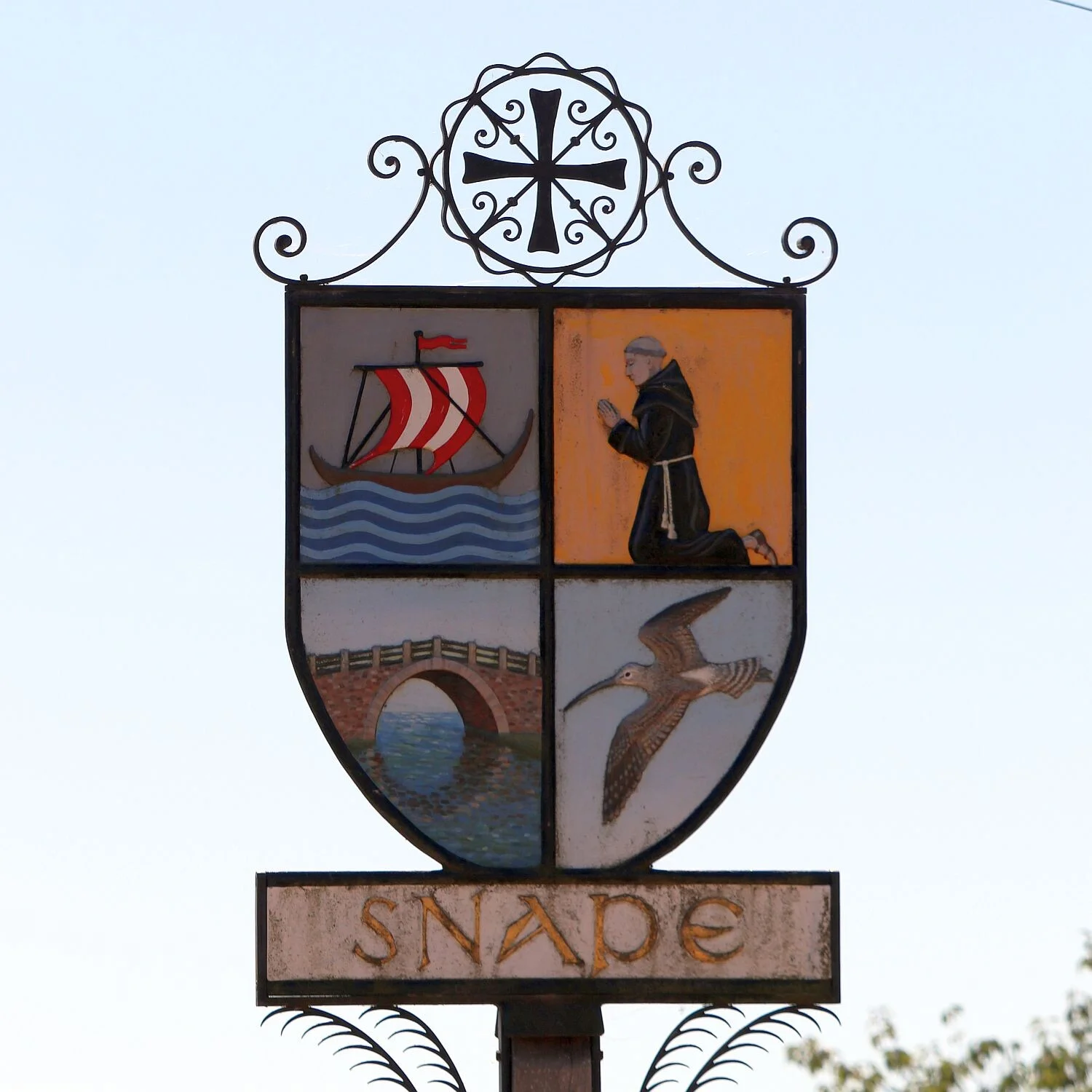
Snape Village Sign

Snape is a small village in the English county of Suffolk, on the River Alde close to Aldeburgh. At the 2011 census the population was 611. In Anglo-Saxon England, Snape was the site of an Anglo-Saxon ship burial. Snape is now best known for Snape Maltings, no longer in commercial use, but converted into a tourist centre together with a concert hall that hosts the major part of the annual Aldeburgh Festival.

== Early history ==
There has been human habitation at Snape for some 2,000 years though the original village stood on higher ground, around the present church (it is not known why the village moved nearer to the river). The Romans established a settlement here, centred on salt production. In Anglo-Saxon times the Wuffingas (who ruled East Anglia from Rendlesham) used Snape largely as a burial site, and archaeological investigations have revealed ship burials and other graves.

In 1085 the Domesday Book recorded forty-nine men. The book also mentions a church, standing in eight acres, and valued at sixteen pence (a larger sum than it now sounds). The present church, however, originally thatched, was built in the 13th century, with the 15th-century additions of a porch and tower.

Snape Priory was founded in 1155 downriver from the village, by William Martell, a local landowner, who was about to set off as part of the Third Crusade. It survived until 1525, when it was closed and stripped of its wealth by Thomas Wolsey, Archbishop of York. One of its barns, built by the monks, is all that still stands, and has been dated to 1295

The monks also built a watermill, and probably also constructed the first bridge across the Alde. This was wooden at first, though in 1802 a brick bridge was built, and then itself replaced in 1960.

In the 15th century Snape (with a population of under 500) shared its own rotten borough Member of Parliament for "Snape-cum-Aldeburgh".

== Governance ==
An electoral ward in the same name exists. This ward stretches north to Benhall with a total population at the 2011 Census of 1,911.

== Trade ==
Snape has had five main industries throughout its history. Under the Romans it was salt production, but in the 19th century it was fertiliser, created from coprolite found locally. The discovery of the commercial viability of this process (by a Saxmundham bone merchant, Edward Packard) led to what has been dubbed "the Suffolk Gold Rush", and local fortunes were made (Packard established what was to become the fertiliser company Fisons, now part of AstraZeneca).

Sugar beet was also an important product; it was first grown commercially in and exported to the Netherlands from Snape. The Maltings, producing and exporting high-quality malted barley, was a fourth important industry, which bequeathed buildings to the fifth significant industry: tourism.

Snape had already tasted success as a tourist destination, for in the 18th and 19th centuries the Snape Race Course on the banks of the Alde was the site of a race meeting held every year for nearly 150 years. This led to the building of a new road (now the A1094) by the Aldeburgh Turnpike Company, which made Snape easy to get to, and which continued to be the main route to the village even after the coming of the railways (which reached Snape in 1888, though only for goods traffic to the Maltings).

As a result of fertiliser, sugar beet, and malted barley, Snape had become a very busy inland port by the end of the 19th century. The Maltings, with its fine brick buildings and riverside position, was ideally suited for redevelopment as a tourist centre when it closed as a going concern in 1960, and now constitutes the main industry in the village. In particular, the famous Aldeburgh Festival is now held in the Maltings, emphasising the area's links with Benjamin Britten.

== In popular culture ==
J. K. Rowling's fictional Harry Potter character, Professor Severus Snape, is named after this place.

== External links and sources ==
- Parish Council maintained site for Snape Village, Suffolk
