= Local ferries in Suffolk =

The ferries in Suffolk are a series of local ferry services in the county of Suffolk in Eastern England. Most cross rivers within the county, and one connects Suffolk with Essex to the south.

Local ferries in Suffolk

== Bawdsey Ferry ==
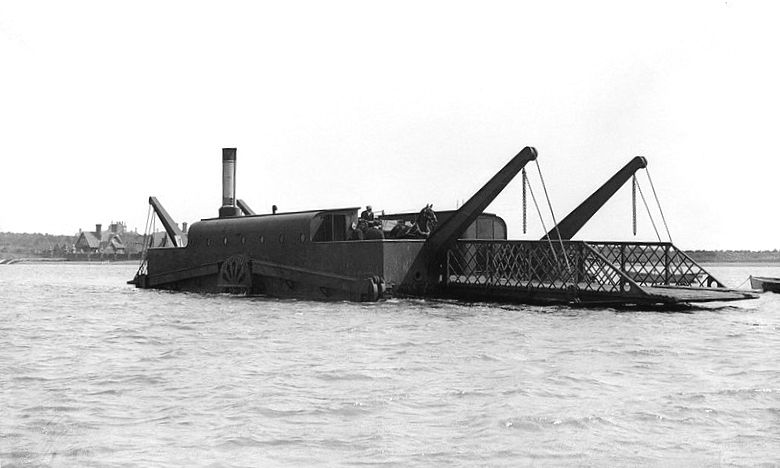
The Lady Beatrice carrying a horse and cart across the Deben in 1906

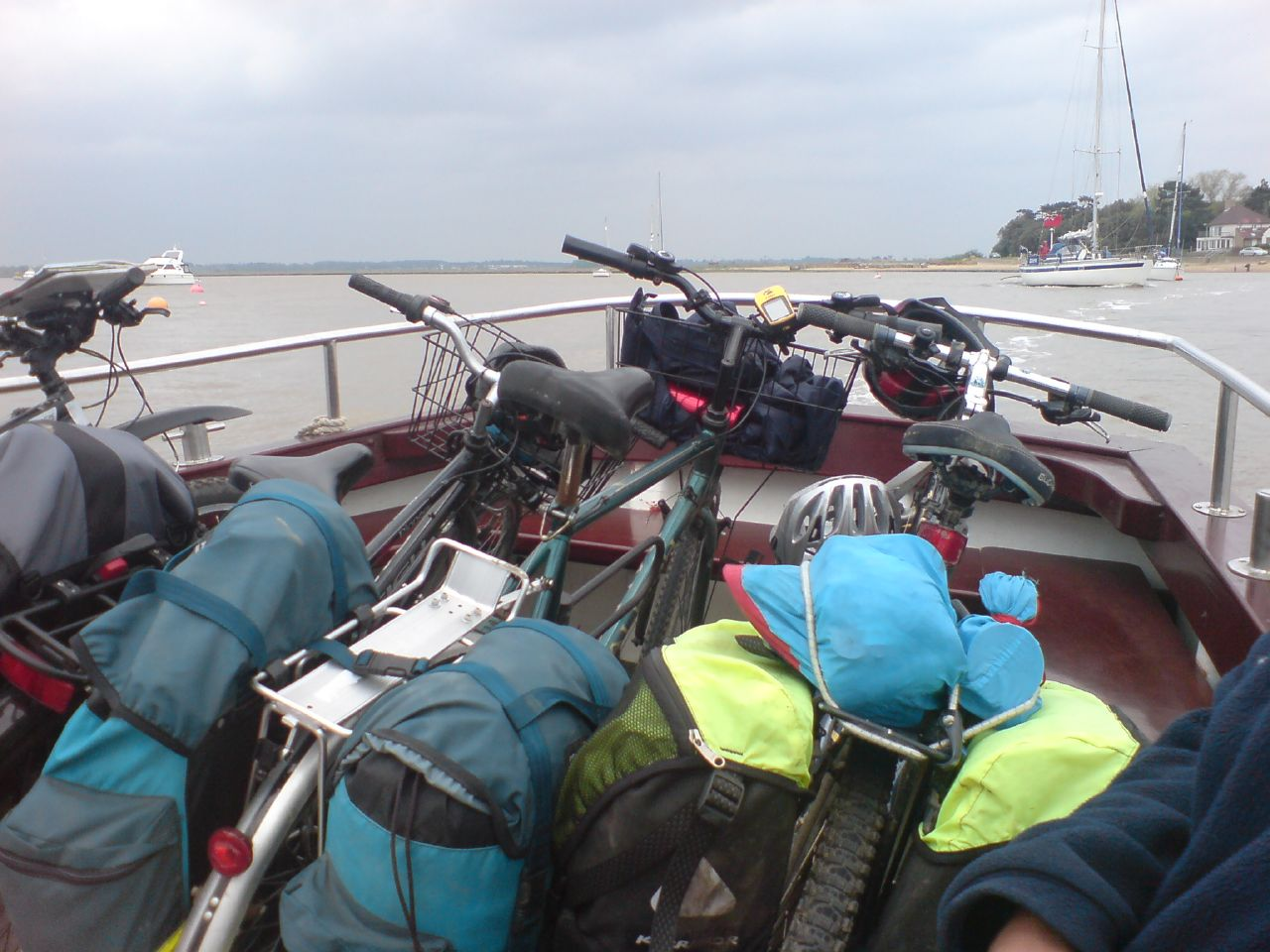
Aboard the modern Bawdsey Ferry

Bawdsey Ferry carries foot passengers and bicycles across the mouth of the River Deben between Felixstowe Ferry and Bawdsey and provides continuity for the Suffolk Coast Path and Regional Cycle Route 41. It operates from Easter weekend until the end of October on a varying timetable, and can also be used as a water taxi to moored yachts.

Felixstowe and Bawdsey Ferry Railway Act 1887 (Note: Section 1.)
- Act of Parliament
- Parliament of the United Kingdom
- Long title: An Act for incorporating a company and authorising them to make and maintain certain railways between Felixstowe and Felixstowe (otherwise Bawdsey) Ferry in the county of Suffolk and for other purposes.
- Citation: 50 & 51 Vict. c. xxvi
- Territorial extent: United Kingdom

Dates
- Royal assent: 23 May 1887
- Commencement: 23 May 1887 (Note: The Acts of Parliament (Commencement) Act 1793.)
Other legislation
Repealed by	Felixstowe and Bawdsey Ferry Railway (Abandonment) Act 1892

Status: Repealed

Text of statute as originally enacted

Felixstowe and Bawdsey Ferry Railway (Extension of Time) Act 1890
- Act of Parliament
- Parliament of the United Kingdom
- Long title: An Act to extend the time for the purchase of Lands for and for the completion of the Felixstowe and Bawdsey Ferry Railway and for other purposes.
- Citation: 53 & 54 Vict. c. xxxv
- Territorial extent: United Kingdom

Dates
- Royal assent: 22 May 1890
- Commencement: 22 May 1890
Other legislation
Repealed by	Felixstowe and Bawdsey Ferry Railway (Abandonment) Act 1892

Status: Repealed

Felixstowe and Bawdsey Ferry Railway (Abandonment) Act 1892
- Act of Parliament
- Parliament of the United Kingdom
- Long title: An Act for the abandonment of the Railways authorised by the Felixstowe and Bawdsey Ferry Railway Act 1887.
- Citation: 55 & 56 Vict. c. xvi
- Territorial extent: United Kingdom

Dates
- Royal assent: 20 May 1892
- Commencement: 20 May 1892
- Repealed: 31 January 2013
Other legislation
Repeals/revokes	Felixstowe and Bawdsey Ferry Railway Act 1887; Felixstowe and Bawdsey Ferry Railway (Extension of Time) Act 1890
Repealed by	Statute Law (Repeals) Act 2013

Status: Repealed

Text of statute as originally enacted

Prior to 1894 the small passenger boats ran ferry trips. In 1894 Sir William Quilter, owner of Bawdsey Manor, established a steam-drawn chain ferry which the family owned until 1931. From 1931 until the start of WW2 Charlie Brinkley then operated a launch for passengers with his son Robert (senior). Bawdsey Manor was purchased by the RAF in 1936 to become RAF Bawdsey and the ferry was closed to the public during WW2. After the end of the war a daily service was operated until 1974 under contract to RAF Bawdsey and since 1974 it has operated on summer weekends only. The Bawdsey Ferry is mentioned in three acts of Parliament, the Felixstowe and Bawdsey Ferry Railway Act 1887 (50 & 51 Vict. c. xxvi), the Felixstowe and Bawdsey Ferry Railway (Extension of Time) Act 1890 (53 & 54 Vict. c. xxxv) and the Felixstowe and Bawdsey Ferry Railway (Abandonment) Act 1892 (55 & 56 Vict. c. xvi)

== Butley Ferry ==
The Butley Ferry

A small ferry operates across the River Butley for foot passengers and for cyclists using Regional Cycle Route 41. It is operated by volunteers on weekends and bank holidays during the summer. It is the smallest licensed ferry in Europe.

== Harwich Harbour Ferry ==
Operates across the River Stour and River Orwell running between Harwich Quay and Landguard Fort near to the Port of Felixstowe and also to Shotley Gate on the Shotley Peninsula (summer only).

== Southwold to Walberswick Ferry ==
The Southwold to Walberswick ferry across the River Blyth uses a traditional rowing boat. In 2017 it operated daily from the start of April to the first week of November, other than most of May and October when it ran on weekends only.

Until 1885 a rowing ferry was used when a floating bridge chain ferry was started, initially hand-cranked ferry later being replaced by a steam ferry which ran until 1942 after improvements to the harbour made operation of the ferry too difficult. Frank Palmer then restarted the old rowing ferry and was succeeded by Bob Cross and David Church.

== See also ==
- Harwich Harbour Ferry
- National Cycle Route 51
- North Sea Cycle Route
- Regional Cycle Route 41
- Suffolk Coast Path
