= Felixstowe Ferry =

Hamlet in Suffolk, England

Coordinates: 51.989°N 1.39°E

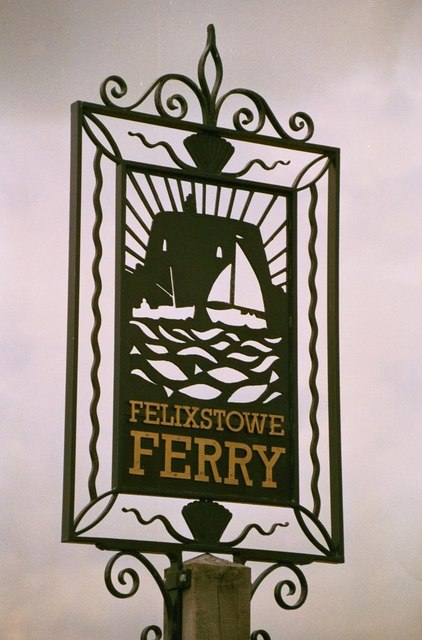
- Felixstowe Ferry village sign

- Location within Suffolk
- Shire county: Suffolk
- Region: East
- Country: England
- Sovereign state: United Kingdom
- Post town: FELIXSTOWE
- Postcode district: IP11
- Dialling code: 01394
- Police: Suffolk
- Fire: Suffolk
- Ambulance: East of England
- UK Parliament: Suffolk Coastal

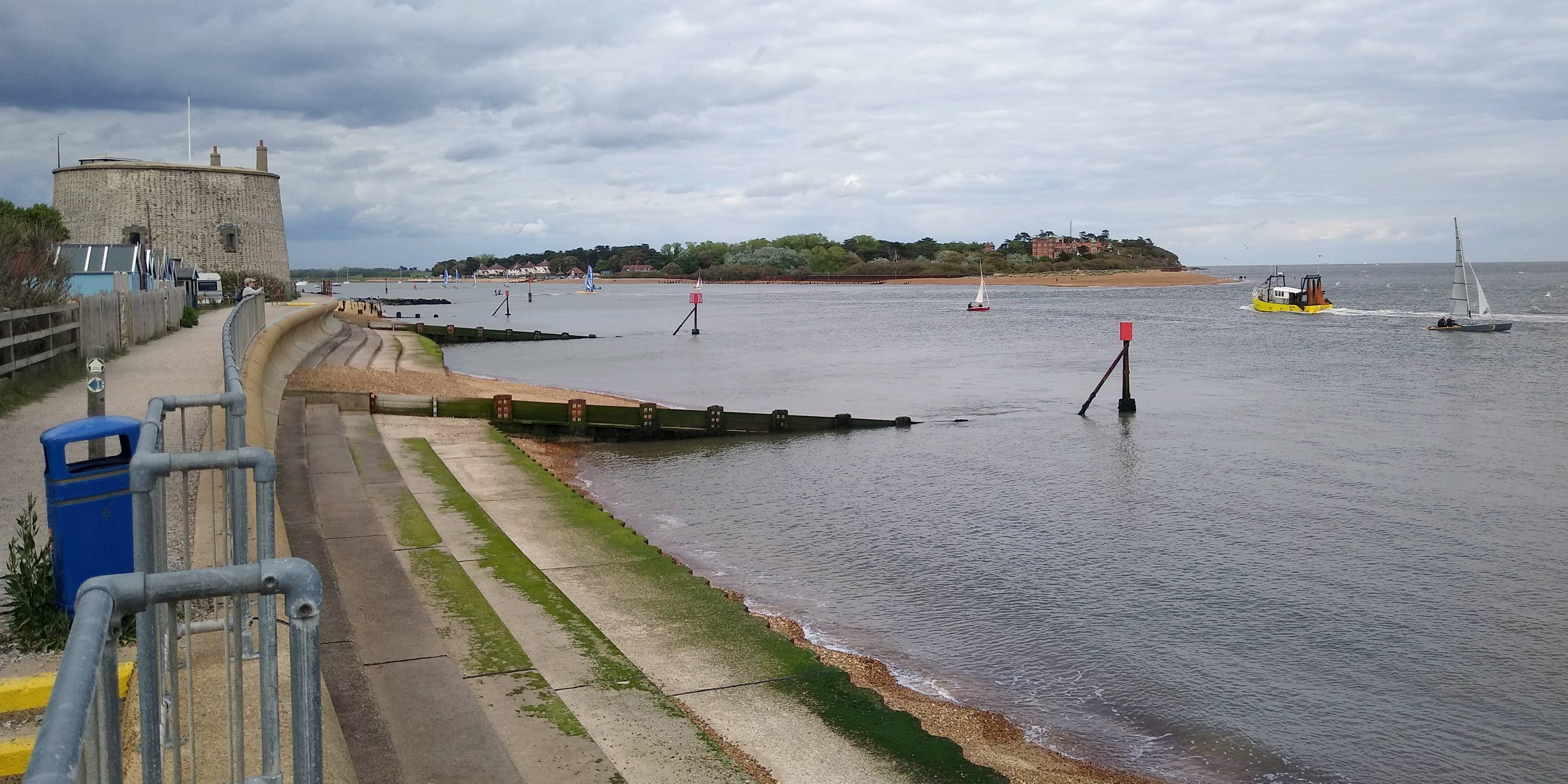
A Martello Tower and the River Deben at Felixstowe Ferry in June 2019

Felixstowe Ferry is a hamlet in Suffolk, England, approximately two miles northeast of Felixstowe at the mouth of the River Deben with a ferry to the Bawdsey peninsula. Home of the Felixstowe cricket world cup.

Two Martello towers dominate the sea front.

The Felixstowe Ferry Millennium Green Trust was set up in 2001 to save an area of land from building development and put it to use as a community open space for recreational use. The land became known as the Millennium Green.

== Gallery ==
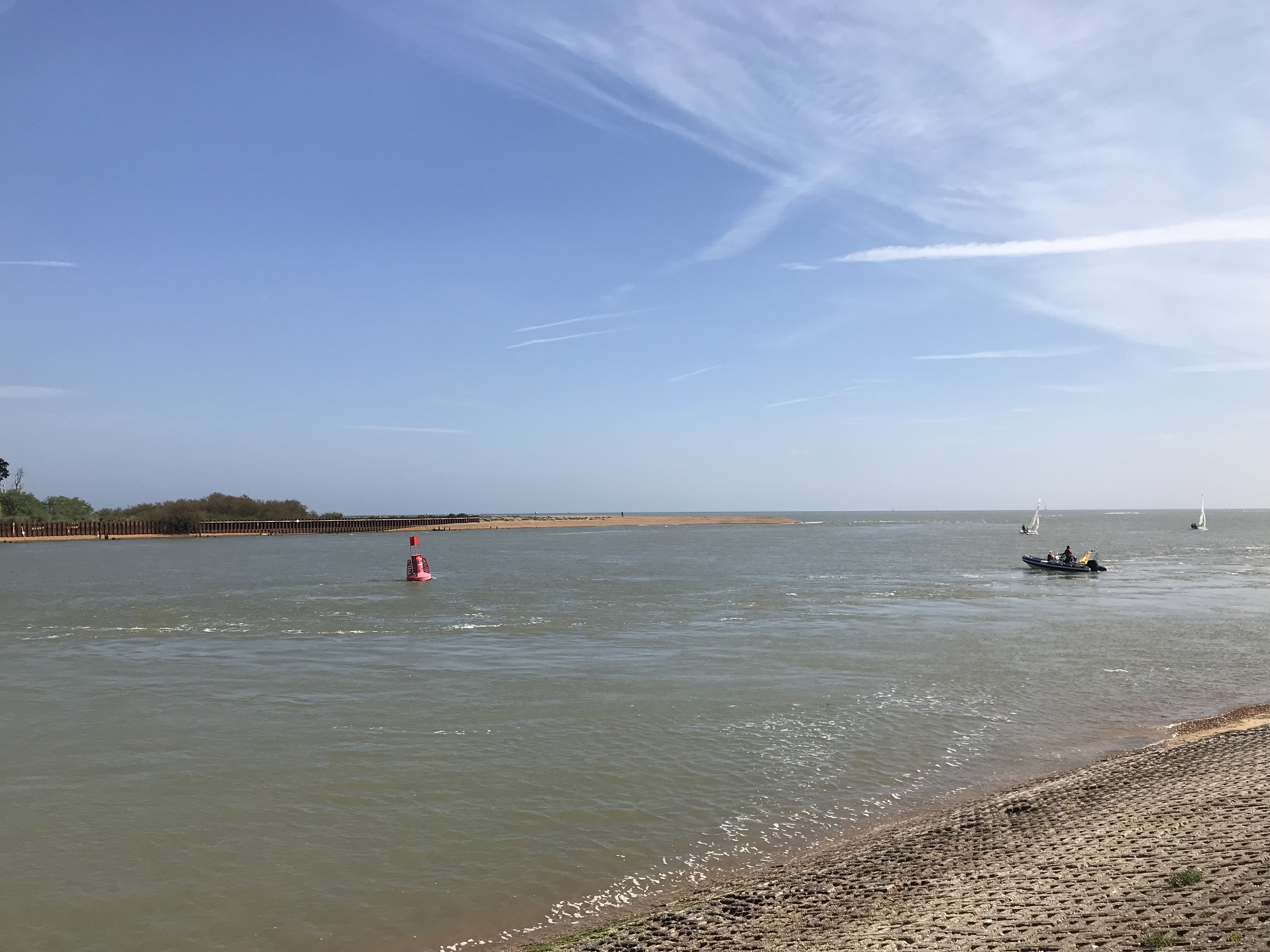

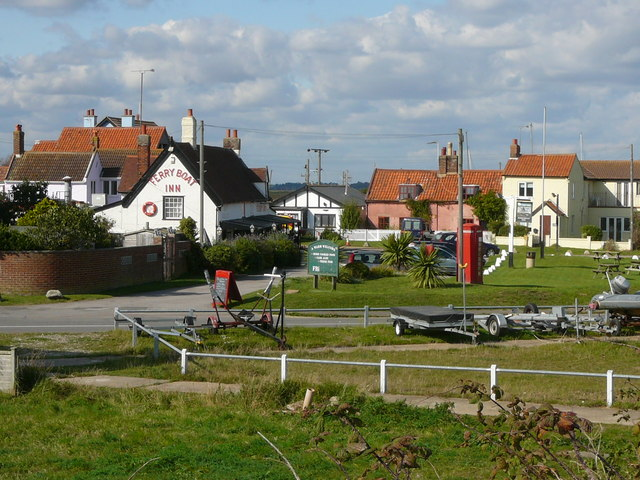

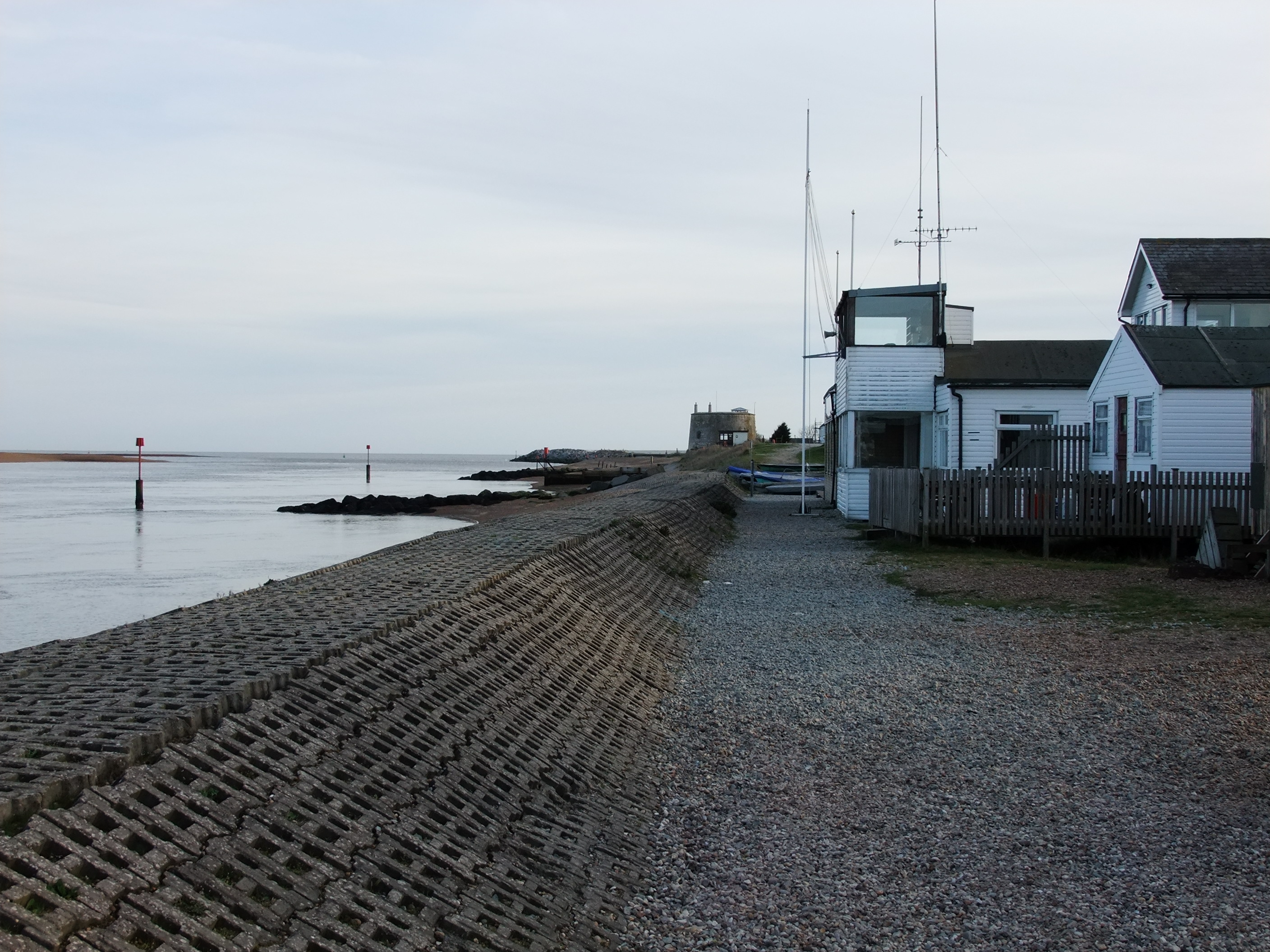

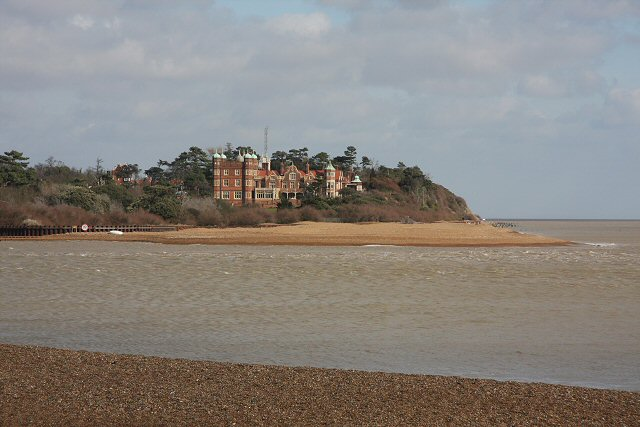

== See also ==
- Bawdsey Ferry
- Felixstowe
- RAF Bawdsey
- Regional Cycle Route 41
- Suffolk Coast Path
