= Regional Cycle Route 41 =

Cycle route in the United Kingdom

Regional Cycle Route 41 in Suffolk runs from Snape to Bramfield through the Suffolk Coast and Heaths, an Area of Outstanding Natural Beauty.

Links to

- National Cycle Route 1 at Felixstowe and also near Bruisyard
- NCR 51 at Felixstowe
- RCR 42 at Snape

== Route ==
=== Woodbridge to Felixstowe ===
Woodbridge | Waldringfield | Kirton | Felixstowe

Leaving Woodbridge, the route follows quiet lanes south through the Deben valley, skirting the riverside near Waldringfield before continuing via Kirton into Felixstowe on minor roads and shared‑use paths.

=== Felixstowe to Snape ===
Felixstowe | Felixstowe Ferry | Bawdsey | Hollesley | Orford | Snape

From Felixstowe, head to Felixstowe Ferry for the short seasonal crossing of the River Deben. On the Bawdsey side the route passes Bawdsey Manor—site of early British radar development—where the historic Transmitter Block opens to visitors on selected days. Continue on quiet lanes/tracks toward Hollesley; north of the village either take the hand‑hauled seasonal Butley Ferry across the Butley River (cycles carried individually; tandems usually not accepted) or follow the signed inland alternative via Chillesford. From Orford continue on‑road to Snape and Snape Maltings, with optional estuary links via Iken.

This section runs within the Suffolk Coast and Heaths National Landscape (AONB); the Sailors’ Path and Snape/Alde estuary waymarked routes provide mapped alternatives and connections. From Snape, continue to National Cycle Route 1 near Bruisyard, or turn east on Regional Route 42 toward Minsmere to rejoin NCR 1 south of Halesworth.

=== Snape to Bruisyard ===
Snape | Sweffling | Bruisyard

From Snape, follow minor lanes via Sweffling to Bruisyard to link with National Cycle Route 1; signing uses standard blue cycle waymarks on the lane network.
