= Newbourne Springs =

Nature reserve in Suffolk, England

Coordinates: 52.043°N 1.307°E

- Site of Special Scientific Interest
- Location of Newbourne Springs.
- Area of search: Suffolk
- Grid reference: TM 269 435
- Interest: Biological
- Area: 15.7 hectares
- Notification date: 1986
- Location map: Magic Map

Newbourne Springs is a 15.7-hectare (39-acre) biological Site of Special Scientific Interest in Newbourne in Suffolk. It is owned by Anglian Water and managed by the Suffolk Wildlife Trust.

Most of this site is a narrow valley with a fast-flowing stream with alder carr and fen. This flows into the Bucklesham Mill River which then flows into Deben Estuary. Drier and more acidic soils have grassland, woodland, scrub and bracken heath. The site is actively managed, producing diverse flora and many breeding and migratory birds such as treecreepers, nuthatches and sedge warblers.

There is access from Woodbridge Road, which goes through the site.
