= Bucklesham Mill River =

Tributary of the River Deben, England

Bucklesham Mill River Mill River
- Former watermill in 2021 from which the river derives its name

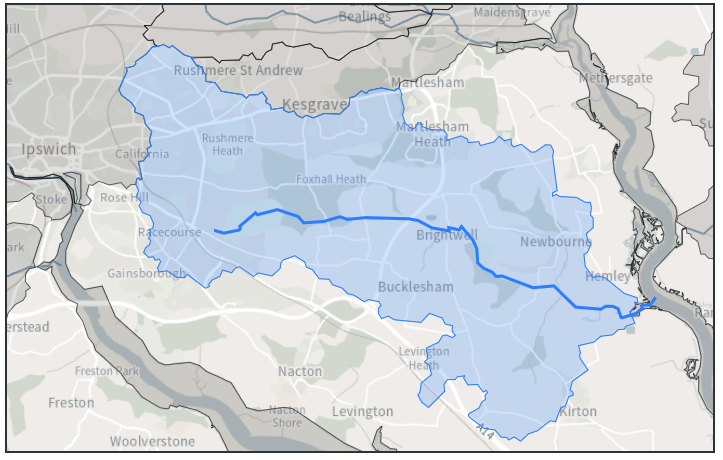
- Defra map of Bucklesham Mill River Water Body, 2024

Physical characteristics
- Mouth: River Deben
  - location: Kirton Creek
  - coordinates: 52°01′37″N 1°20′38″E
- Length: 11.3 km (7.0 mi)
- Basin size: 46.298 km^{2} (17.876 sq mi)

Bucklesham Mill River – sometimes referred to simply as Mill River – is a tributary of the River Deben in Suffolk, England. It is 11.3 km (7.0 mi) long and with the Newbourne Stream which flows into it at Newbourne it constitutes the Bucklesham Mill River Water Body with a catchment area of 46.298 km^{2} (17.876 sq mi).

The river gets its name from the Bucklesham watermill, located on Watermill Road where it crosses the river leading to Newbourne.

The river rises at a number of locations on the outskirts of Ipswich and after flowing through diverse varieties of landscape it reaches the River Deben at Kirton Creek: The river acts as a natural wildlife corridor linking several County Wildlife Sites:

- The Mount
- Brightwell Gazing Meadows
- Valley Farm Meadow
