= Øysang ferry =

Ferry built in 1950

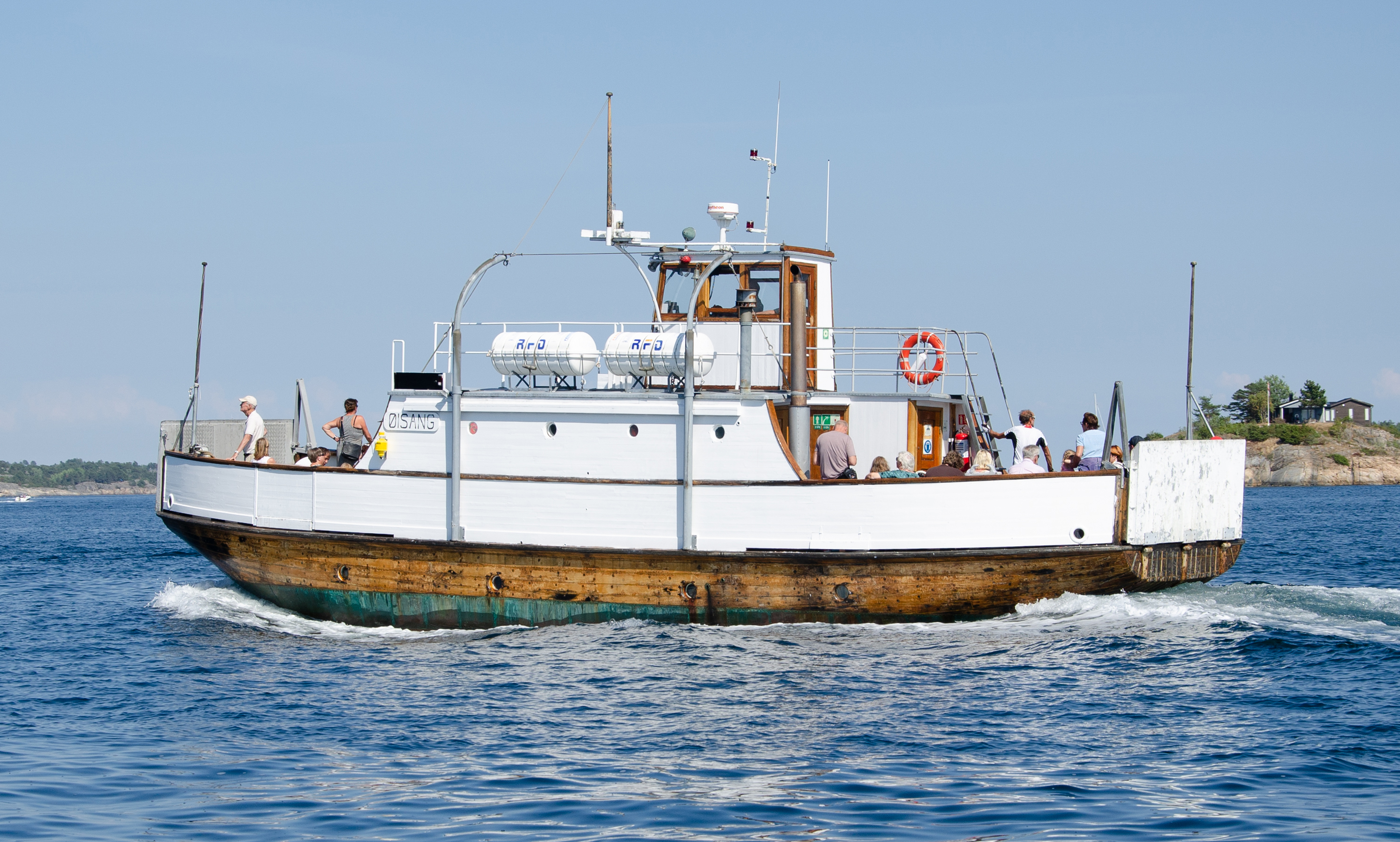
- MF Øisang

History

Norway
- Name: Øisang
- Owner: Østre Søndeled og Risør Fjordruter
- Builder: E. M. Moen & Sons
- Launched: 1950
- In service: 1950
- Refit: 2003
- Home port: Risør
- Status: in active service

General characteristics
- Type: Car & passenger ferry
- Length: 16.32 m (53.5 ft)
- Beam: 5.06 m (16.6 ft)
- Draft: 2.38 m (7.8 ft)
- Decks: 1
- Capacity: 60 passengers, 3 vehicles.
- Crew: 2

MF Øisang is a car/passenger ferry running the 4 km (2.5 mi) route between Risør and Øysang across the Søndeled fjord. Constructed in 1950, it is the oldest wooden-hulled ferry still operating in Norway.

On a daily basis, the ferry serves as a connection for students to and from school. The ferry makes 4 daily crossings in the winter months, increasing to 7 daily trips in the summer months to coincide with the tourism season. As needed, it also docks at a bathing and recreation area on one of the islands east of Risør town. The journey across the fjord is part of the North Sea Cycle Route.

The route was threatened with closure in the late 1990s, but after a local interest group had worked to keep the route going, the ferry was refitted in 2003.
