= Bicycle Route 1 =

Bicycle Route 1 may refer to:

== Denmark ==
- Danish national bicycle route 1

== United States ==
- U.S. Bicycle Route 1
- Delaware Bicycle Route 1
- Claire Saltonstall Bikeway, also known as Bike Route 1
