= Harwich Harbour Ferry =

Ferry route in Harwich, England

Coordinates: 51°56′22″N 1°18′17″E

- ferry/water interchange
- Locale: Harwich, Suffolk
- Waterway: River Stour, River Orwell
- Transit type: Water taxi
- Began operation: 1912
- System length: 2.5 miles (4.0 km)
- No. of lines: 2
- No. of vessels: 1
- No. of terminals: 3
- Website: Harwich Harbour Ferry

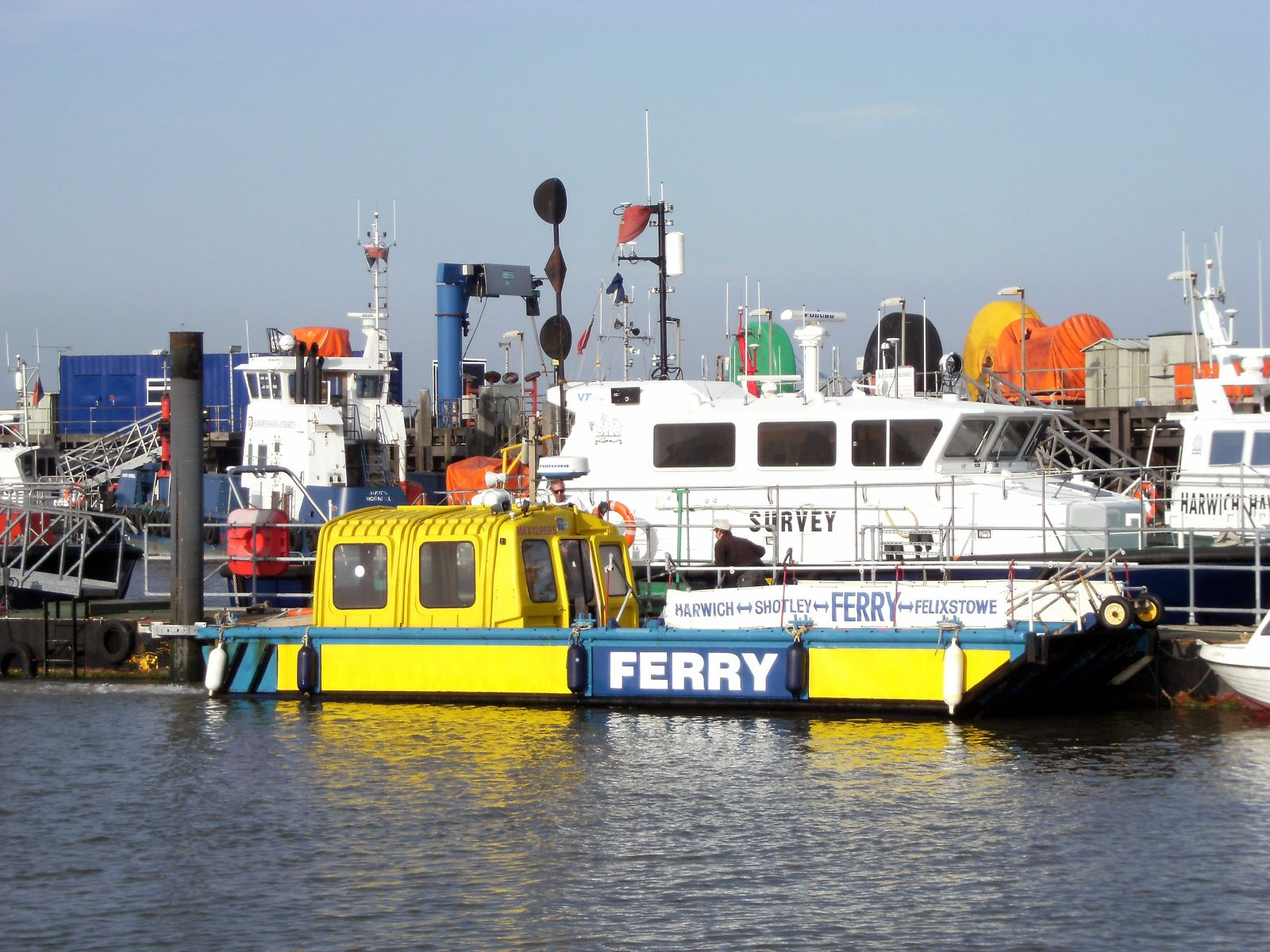
Ferries in Harwich Harbour

The Harwich Harbour Ferry is a foot and bicycle ferry for 58 passengers that runs from April until end of October between Ha'penny Pier near Harwich to Landguard Fort near Felixstowe and Shotley marina. As well as for local traffic, this ferry can be used as a short cut on the Suffolk Coast Path; it takes bicycles, prams, e-bikes and is used by National Cycle Route NCR 51 and the North Sea Cycle Route.

The ferry service started in 1912 and was operated from 1925 until 1992 by the MV Brightlingsea. The service was later started with the MV Explorer 12, a Sea Truck, which is owned by Austrian Christian Zemann and his English wife Lucy Zemann and licensed to carry 12 passengers.

As of 2016 the service is provided by the simply-named Harbour Ferry. The boat was once a lifeboat from the liner SS Canberra and is now licensed and equipped for 58 passengers.

== See also ==
- Felixstowe
- Harwich International Port
- Landguard Fort
- Local Ferries in Suffolk
- National Cycle Route 51
- North Sea Cycle Route
- Suffolk Coast Path
