= National Cycle Route 11 =

Bikeway in England, connecting Harlow, Essex to King's Lynn, Norfolk

National Cycle Route 11 is a bikeway in England on the UK's National Cycle Network, connecting Harlow in Essex to King's Lynn in Norfolk.

== Route ==
=== Harlow to Cambridge ===
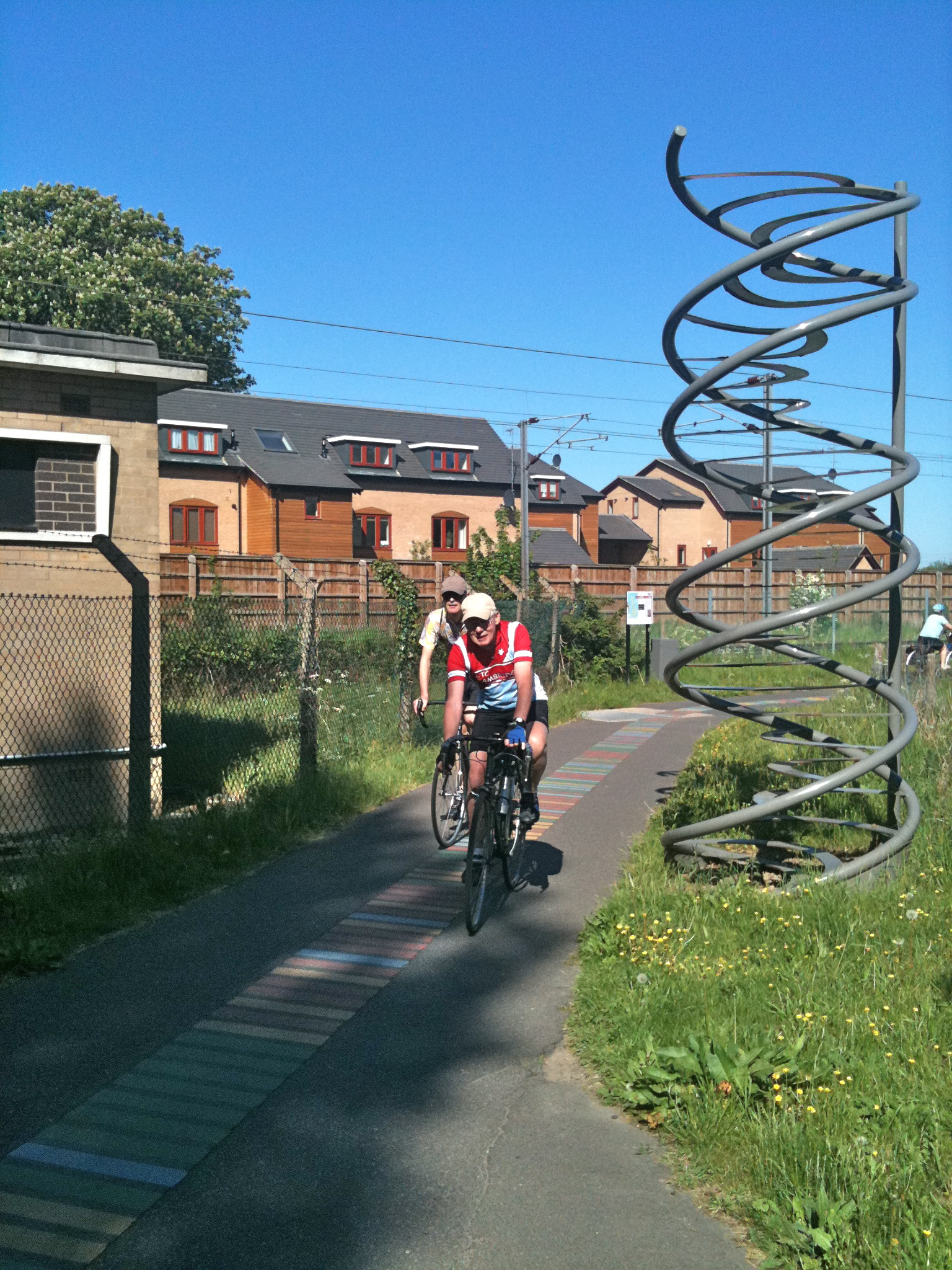
NCR 11 near Great Shelford, showing a double helix and a small part of the BRCA2 gene.

Harlow | Bishop's Stortford | Hinxton | Sawston | Cambridge

Route 11 is planned to start in Harlow at a junction with route 1. However, aside from a short section of off-road cycle path near Bishop's Stortford, there is no route before Stansted Mountfitchet. Here a delisted section on country lanes heads north to near Audley End station where the listed section continues north to Ickleton and Duxford. Off-road sections via Sawston lead to an off-road path parallel with the railway at Great Shelford.

This section of the cycle path, about two kilometres (one and a quarter miles) long, from Great Shelford to Addenbrooke's Hospital in Cambridge, is decorated with 10,257 lines of four colours representing the nucleotide sequence of the BRCA2 gene. This gene, implicated in early-onset breast cancer, was discovered in 1994; the discoverers included scientists from nearby Addenbrooke's Hospital and the Sanger Institute, Hinxton.

This section of path also includes and commemorates the 10,000th mile of the National Cycle Network. It is fondly referred to by regular users as "The DNA path". It offers a fine view of White Hill and Clarke's Hill, which are the northernmost peaks of the Gog Magog Hills.

Route 11 intersects with National Cycle Route 51 in Cambridge.

=== Cambridge to King's Lynn ===
Cambridge | Burwell | Wicken | Ely | Downham Market | Watlington | King's Lynn

Intersects with National Cycle Route 1 near King's Lynn

Route 11 passes through the historic centre of Cambridge passing buildings including Kings College Chapel. Leaving the city, the cycle path uses the south bank of the River Cam before crossing to the north side and following the riverside path to Waterbeach station. Here there is a gap in the cycle route to Bottisham Lode. Cyclists heading further north should therefore follow route 51 via Fen Ditton, Bottisham and Lode to join route 11 again at Bottisham Lode.

The next section of the route to Wicken Fen nature reserve uses a sequence of roads, tracks and bridges across the fenland called the Lodes Way. There is a challenging footbridge with cycle channels at Burwell Lode which is very steep. At Wicken Fen there is a visitor centre with cafe and cycle hire. Route 11 then follows country lanes and the River Ouse to Ely where route 11 passes Ely Cathederal.

Leaving Ely, route 11 is signed to Little Downham, but then delisted to Ten Mile Bank as the roads are now too busy to be safe for family cycling, particularly the section on the A1101. However, this route can still be followed and is still shown on Ordnance Survey maps. This section passes the Welney Wetland Centre.

From Ten Mile Bank, route 11 mostly follows country lanes via Downham Market and Watlington to a junction with National Cycle Route 1 near Wiggenhall St Germans. Route 1 can then be followed into the centre of Kings Lynn along the east bank of the River Great Ouse.
