= Bawdsey Manor =

Country house in Bawdsey, Suffolk, England

Coordinates: 51.9896°N 1.3996°E

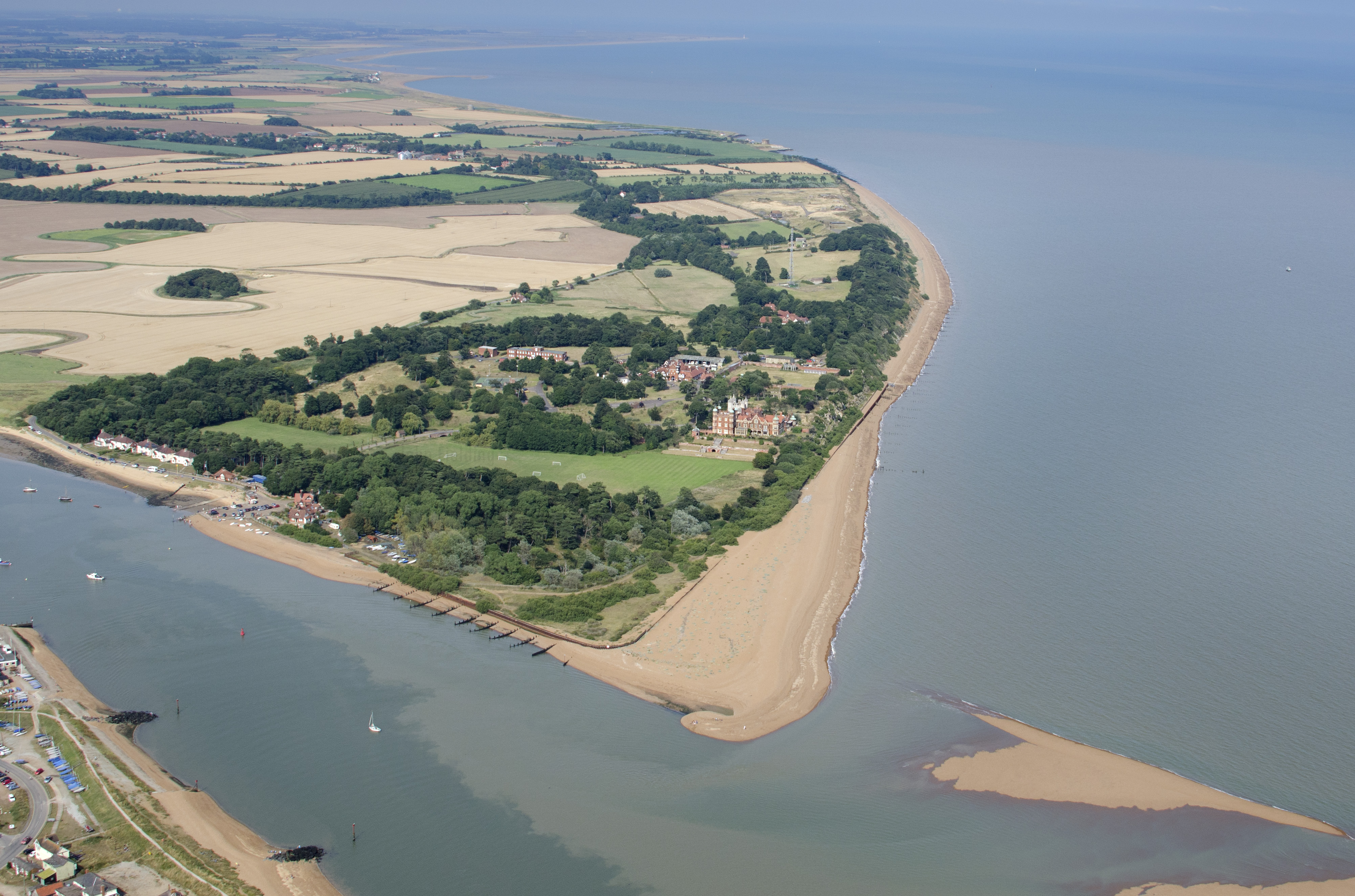
Bawdsey Manor and the mouth of the River Deben from the air

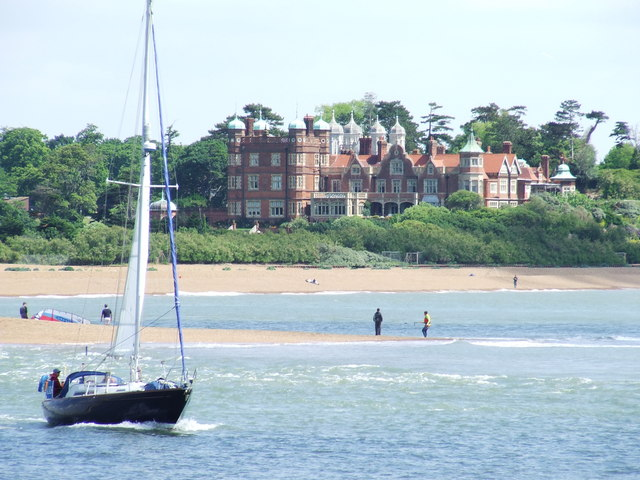
Bawdsey Manor

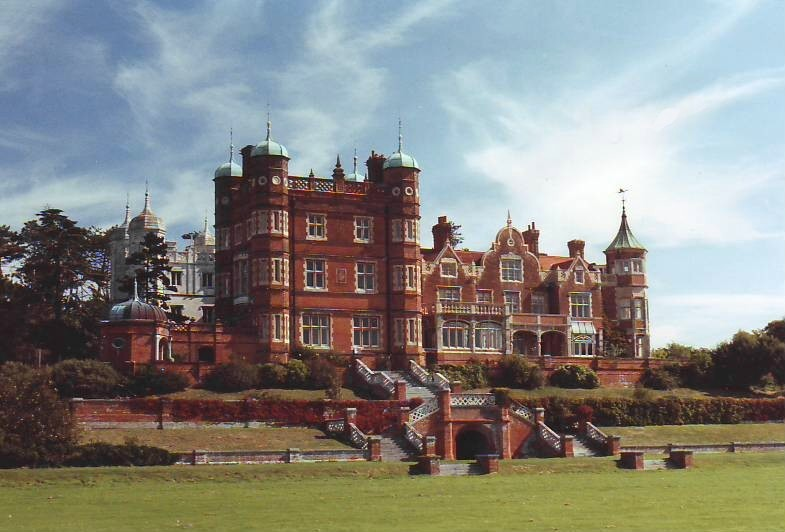
Bawdsey Manor House Detailed Southerly Elevation

Bawdsey Manor stands at a prominent position at the mouth of the River Deben close to the village of Bawdsey in Suffolk, England, about 75 miles (120 km) north-east of London. Built in 1886, it was enlarged in 1895 as the principal residence of Sir William Cuthbert Quilter. Requisitioned by the Devonshire Regiment during World War I and having been returned to the Quilter family after the war, it was purchased by the Air Ministry for £24,000 in 1936 to establish a new research station for developing the Chain Home RDF (radar) system. RAF Bawdsey was a base through the Cold War until the 1990s. The manor is now used by PGL for courses and children's holidays. There is a small museum in the radar transmitter block.

== History ==
=== Quilter period: 1886 to 1936 ===
Bawdsey Manor was built in 1886 and enlarged in 1895 by William Quilter who was an art collector, one of the founders of the National Telephone Company, and was Liberal/Liberal Unionist Member of Parliament for Sudbury. He established a steam-powered chain ferry across the River Deben in 1894 to access the nearest railway station at Felixstowe. It was known as the Bawdsey Ferry and ran until 1931. The ferry now operates using a motor-launch at weekends during the summer.

Maude Marion Quilter (born about 1868) of Bawdsey Manor, daughter of Sir William Quilter, 1st Baronet, married Frederick Denny in 1888 and later had Horwood House as her country residence. It was at Bawdsey Manor that she knew of Harry Thrower, the father of the broadcaster and gardener Percy Thrower, as he was a gardener there, it being his first gardening position. When Maude wanted a head gardener at Horwood House, she recruited Harry and he remained there for the rest of his life.

=== RAF Base: 1936 to 1990 ===
In February 1936 research scientists, including Robert Watson-Watt moved into the manor to begin research and development into radar for practical military use and it became known as RAF Bawdsey. Stables and outbuildings were converted into workshops and 240 ft (73 m) wooden receiver towers and 360 ft (110 m) steel transmitter towers were built. Bawdsey was the Air Ministry's secret radar research establishment until this moved away on the outbreak of war in 1939. Most of the key radar scientists of the day, and the first generation of RAF and WAAF radar personnel, were trained there. From 1937 Bawdsey was operational as the first of the RDF (radar) Chain Home, and during World War II also acquired Chain Home Low and Coast Defence/Centimetric equipment for tracking enemy ships. It continued as a radar station through most of the Cold War. Demolition of the 10 towers began in the 1960s, and they all are now gone. Bawdsey Manor continued as an RAF base through the Cold War and Bloodhound surface-to-air missiles were sited on the cliffs until the Bloodhound force ceased operations in 1990, when all the missiles were withdrawn to RAF West Raynham. RAF Bawdsey was closed in 1991.

=== Since 1990 ===
The Manor, grounds, and associated buildings were used from 1994 to 2016 to house Alexanders College, a boarding and day school for children from ages 11 to 18.

The Transmitter Block is a museum, with limited opening hours, and was featured in the BBC Restoration programme. The exhibit is known as "The Magic Ear", and is operated by the Bawdsey Radar Group.

=== 2017 ===
The property was sold to PGL Travel Ltd. and was opened for summer 2017.

== See also ==
- Bawdsey Ferry
- Quilter Baronets
- RAF Bawdsey
