= Danish National Cycle Route 4 =

Cycle route in Denmark

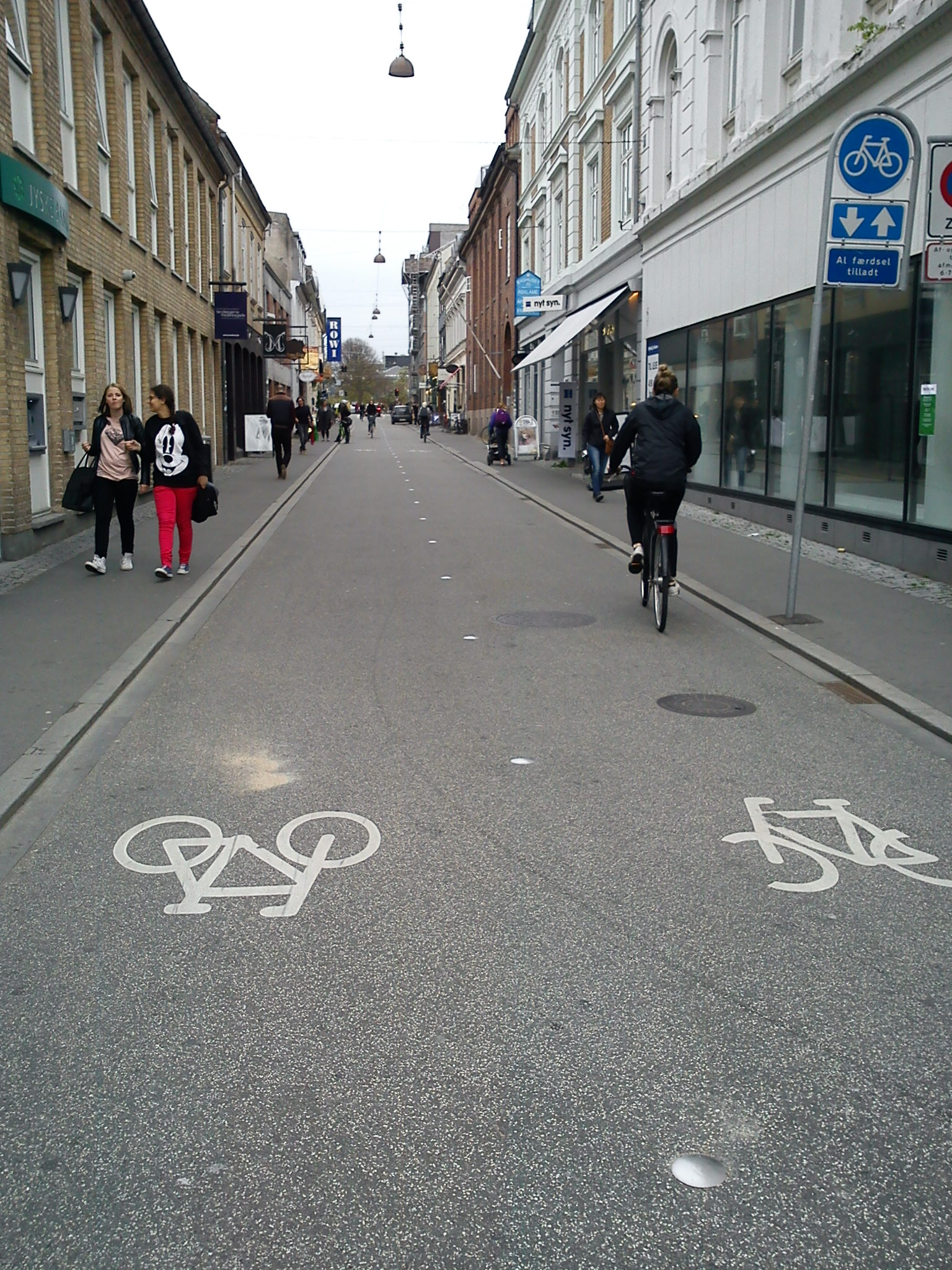
Frederiksgade in Aarhus is a part of the route

Danish national cycle route 4 (Danish: National cykelrute 4 Søndervig - København) is the fourth of the 11 Danish National Cycle Routes. It runs from Søndervig in West Jutland to Copenhagen on the island Zealand. The route is 310 km (190 mi) long, with 90% of this distance being along paved roads and one trip on a ferry between Aarhus and Odden.

== Towns on the route ==
1	Ringkøbing
2	Aarhus
3	Roskilde
4	København

== See also ==
- Danish National Cycle Routes
