= Deben Estuary SSSI =

Nature reserve in Suffolk, England

Coordinates: 52.04°N 1.35°E

Deben Estuary
- Site of Special Scientific Interest
- Location of Deben Estuary.
- Area of search: Suffolk
- Grid reference: TM 296 434
- Interest: Biological
- Area: 981.1 hectares
- Notification date: 1991
- Location map: Magic Map

Designations

Ramsar Wetland
- Official name: Deben Estuary
- Designated: 11 March 1996
- Reference no.: 794

Deben Estuary SSSI is a 981.1-hectare (2,424-acre) biological Site of Special Scientific Interest (SSSI) covering the River Deben and its banks 12 kilometres (7.5 miles) from its mouth north of Felixstowe to Woodbridge in Suffolk. It is a Ramsar internationally important wetland site and a Special Protection Area under the European Union Directive on the Conservation of Wild Birds. It is also in the Suffolk Coast and Heaths Area of Outstanding Natural Beauty. It partly overlaps two geological SSSIs, Ferry Cliff, Sutton and Ramsholt Cliff.

The site has been designated an SSSI for its overwintering waders and wildfowl, and for its diverse saltmarshes. It has internationally important overwintering redshanks and nationally important numbers of dark-bellied brent geese, shelducks and black-tailed godwits. The estuary also has three nationally rare plants and a nationally rare mollusc.
