= Ramsholt Cliff =

Geological site in the United Kingdom

Coordinates: 52.035°N 1.348°E

- Site of Special Scientific Interest
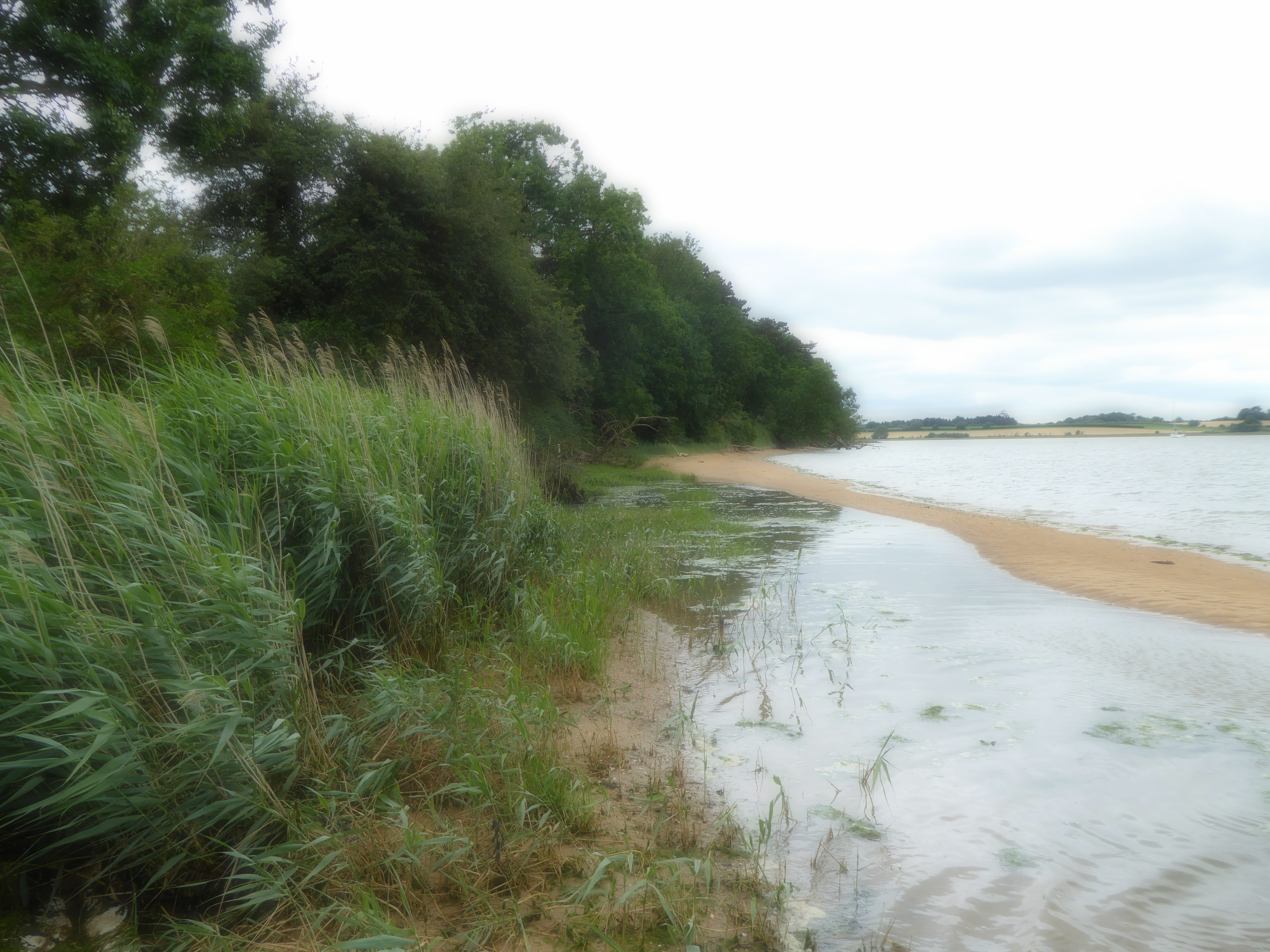
- Location of Ramsholt Cliff.
- Area of search: Suffolk
- Grid reference: TM 297 427
- Interest: Geological
- Area: 2.1 hectares
- Notification date: 1987
- Location map: Magic Map

Ramsholt Cliff is a 2.1-hectare (5.2-acre) geological Site of Special Scientific Interest north-west of Ramsholt in Suffolk. It is a Geological Conservation Review site, and it is in the Suffolk Coast and Heaths Area of Outstanding Natural Beauty.

This site is very important historically because it was the basis for the distinction of the Pliocene Coralline Crag Formation as a new stratigraphical division by the nineteenth-century geologist, Edward Charlesworth. The well preserved fossils include several unusual species.

Most of this steeply sloping site on the bank of the River Deben is inaccessible, but a footpath runs along the top and a track leads to a small area of bank.
