= MV Brightlingsea =

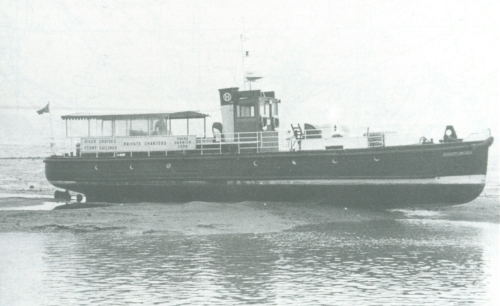

History
- Name: MV Brightlingsea
- Operator: 1925–1948: London and North Eastern Railway; 1948–1964: British Railways; 1964–1979: Orwell and Harwich Navigation Company; 1979–1985: Felixstowe Dock and Railway Company; 1985–????: Harry Rodgers
- Port of registry: (United Kingdom)
- Builder: Rowhedge Ironworks
- Launched: 1925

General characteristics
- Tonnage: 51 gross register tons (GRT)
- Length: 67.5 feet (20.6 m)
- Beam: 16.1 feet (4.9 m)
- Depth: 7.4 feet (2.3 m)
- Capacity: 152 passengers

MV Brightlingsea is a passenger vessel which was built for the London and North Eastern Railway in 1925.

== History ==
The ship was built by Rowhedge Ironworks and launched in 1925 for the Harwich to Felixstowe ferry service. She was taken over by British Railways in 1948 and in 1964 by the Orwell and Harwich Navigation Company. They sold the vessel to the Felixstowe Dock and Railway Company in 1979 and she was sold again in 1985 to Harry Rodger.

The opening of the Orwell Bridge in 1982 dented the Harwich to Felixstowe ferry trade, and she has been restored in Woodbridge and as of 2015 was advertised for sale.

In 2005 she was included in the National Register of Historic Vessels.
