= Newbourne =

Village in Suffolk, England

Coordinates: 52.039289°N 1.313249°E

- The Street, Newbourne

- Location within Suffolk
- Population: 304 (Including Hemley. 2011 Census)
- OS grid reference: TM272430
- District: East Suffolk
- Shire county: Suffolk
- Region: East
- Country: England
- Sovereign state: United Kingdom
- Post town: Woodbridge
- Postcode district: IP12
- Dialling code: 01473
- Police: Suffolk
- Fire: Suffolk
- Ambulance: East of England
- UK Parliament: Suffolk Coastal
- Website: newbourne.onesuffolk.net

Newbourne is a village and civil parish in the East Suffolk district of Suffolk, England. It lies on the peninsula between the River Orwell and the River Deben, to the east of Ipswich and south of Woodbridge.

== History ==
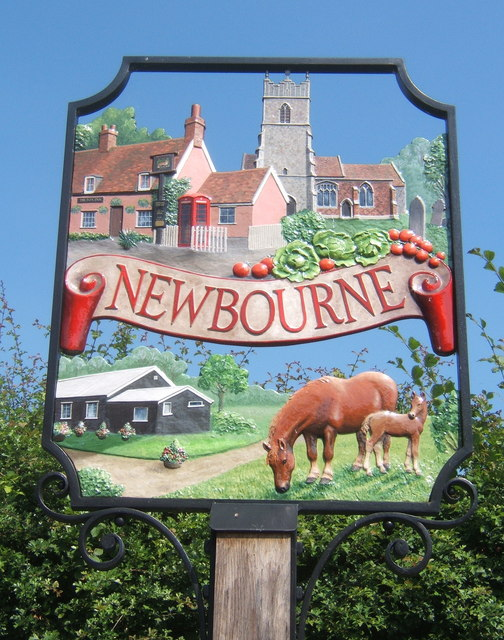
The village sign with images of local significance

The name Newbourne is commonly accepted to derive from the Old English words for 'new stream.' However, it has also been put forward that its origins may be from the Old Norse words for 'nine springs,' which is supported by the large number of nearby springs, and other villages in the local area with names of Old Norse origin.

The length of human habitation at Newbourne is unknown but record of the settlement is found in the Domesday Book of 1086 under the name Neubrunna.

In the 1881 census the total population of Newbourne is recorded as 141. This decreased in each census thereafter, with a low of 81 in 1931, until in 1951 the census showed a significant increase to a total population of 291. This rise in population was primarily due to the influx of people brought into the village by the Land Settlement Association.

=== Land Settlement Association ===
The Land Settlement Association was set up in 1934 as an experimental scheme to provide unemployed workers from depressed industrial areas with employment on the land. Successful applicants received agricultural training, land in rural areas, and cattle to rear. Recruitment into the scheme ended with the start of the Second World War and eventually the settlements were dissolved and privatised in 1983. Newbourne was one of the areas involved in the scheme and its legacy can be seen in commercial greenhouses, plant nurseries and roadside produce stalls remaining in the village and local area.

=== Church of St Mary ===
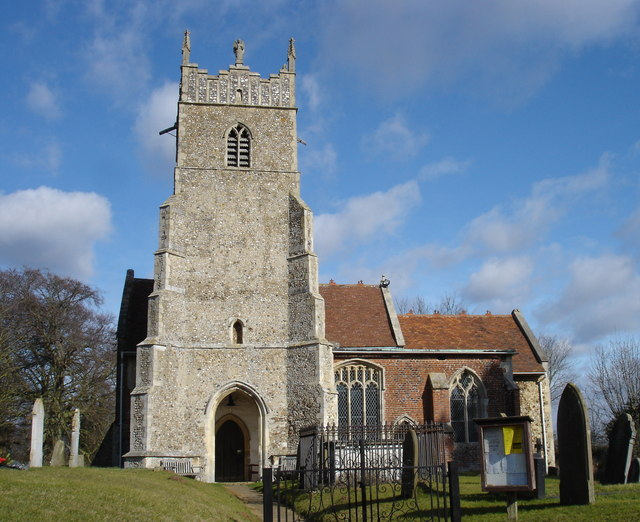
The Grade I listed Church of St Mary

The Church of St Mary is a Grade I listed building and the parish church for Newbourne. The church building is medieval in origin with its nave and chancel dating to the 12th century and a number of expansions and restorations occurring in subsequent centuries.

During the Great Storm of 1987 the Victorian stained glass of the east end was blown out. Rather than recreate the new windows in the previous style a more modern form was commissioned. The new window also includes a fragment of the original windows, in the form of the face of Christ, that was found intact amongst the rubble after the storm.

In the graveyard are buried the brothers George and Meadows Page. During the 1800s they were known as the Newbourne Giants and were part of a travelling circus. At the time of his death in 1870 it is said George was 7 feet 7 inches (2.31 m) tall. Meadows was slightly shorter at 7 feet 4 inches, he gave up circus life in 1875 and died in 1917.

=== Newbourne Hall ===
Newbourne Hall is the old manor house of Newbourne. It is a Grade II* listed building and dates to the 14th century. It is part timber framed and plastered, part red brick, and is built in a general 'T' cross form with a 17th-century extension and a 21st-century west wing. The hall is open for viewing by appointment only.

The valley marsh and wet woodland within Newbourne Springs

== Amenities ==
Centres for community involvement include the Church of St Mary, a village hall, and The Fox Inn public house, a Grade II listed building dating from the late 17th to early 18th century There are plant nurseries, a farm shop selling local produce and craft items, and a mobile library.

=== Newbourne Springs ===
Newbourne Springs is a small nature reserve and SSSI on the edge of the village. It is composed of a range of habitats, primarily broadleaved and mixed woodland with some areas of marsh, fen and heathland. It is currently managed by Suffolk Wildlife Trust on behalf of Anglian Water who own the land. Because of the large number of springs within its area it was used as a source of water for Felixstowe and the surrounding area by Anglian Water until the 1980s. The old pumping station has been converted into a visitors centre for the reserve. During autumn and winter months regular volunteer working parties help with maintenance of the reserve. A number of public footpaths run from the village through Newbourne Springs.
