= Ferry Cliff, Sutton =

Nature reserve in Suffolk, England

Coordinates: 52.089°N 1.324°E

- Site of Special Scientific Interest
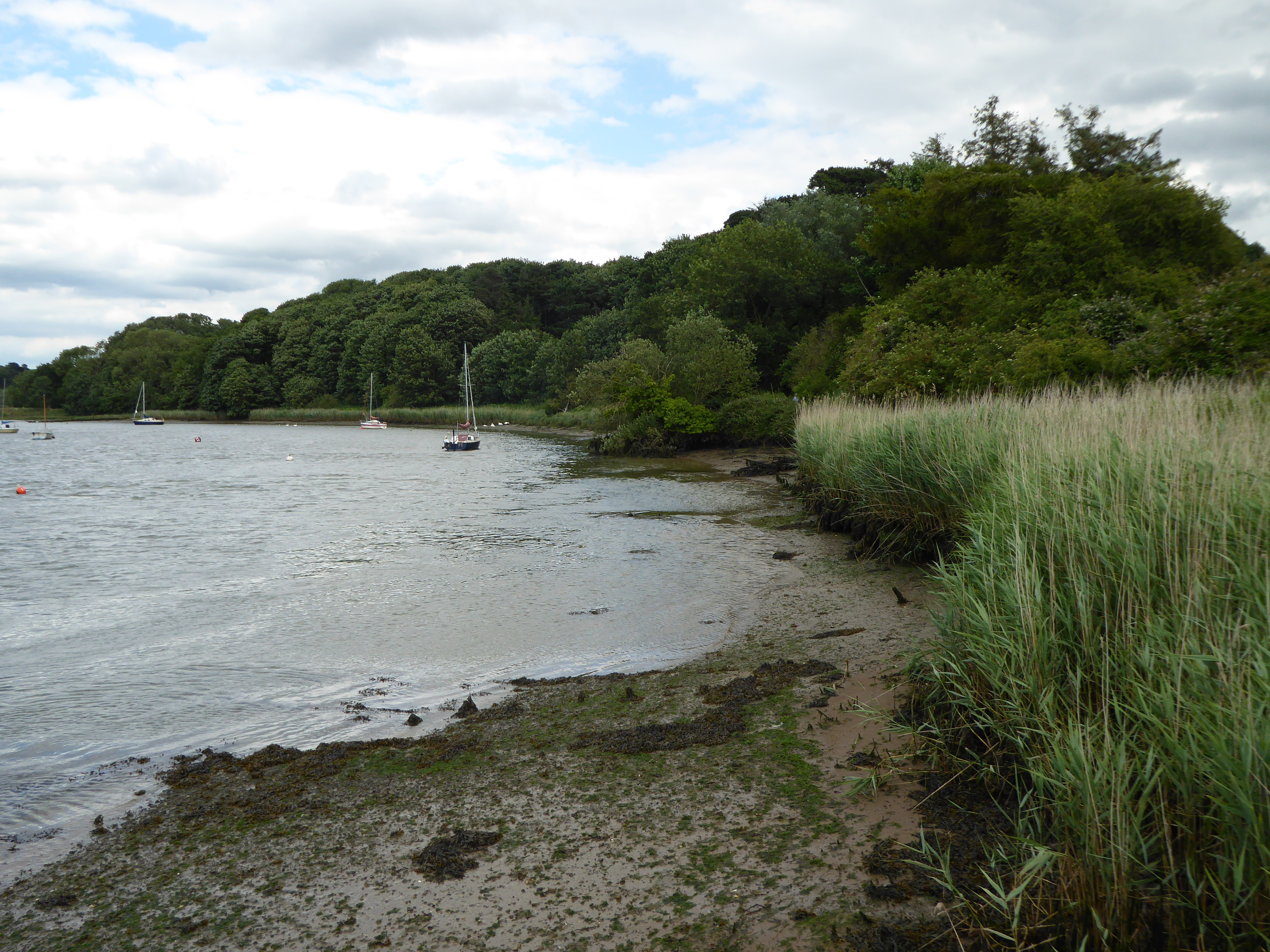
- Location of Ferry Cliff, Sutton.
- Area of search: Suffolk
- Grid reference: TM 278 486
- Interest: Geological
- Area: 2.8 hectares
- Notification date: 1987
- Location map: Magic Map

Ferry Cliff, Sutton is a 2.8-hectare (6.9-acre) geological Site of Special Scientific Interest in Suffolk. It is a Geological Conservation Review site, and it is in the Suffolk Coast and Heaths Area of Outstanding Natural Beauty.

This site exposes rocks dating to the Paleocene, around 60 million years ago. It has the oldest British fossils of rodents, and ungulates, both even and odd toed. It also has early hyracotheriums.

A public footpath runs through this very steep site.
