= Danish National Cycle Routes =

Network of cycle routes in Denmark

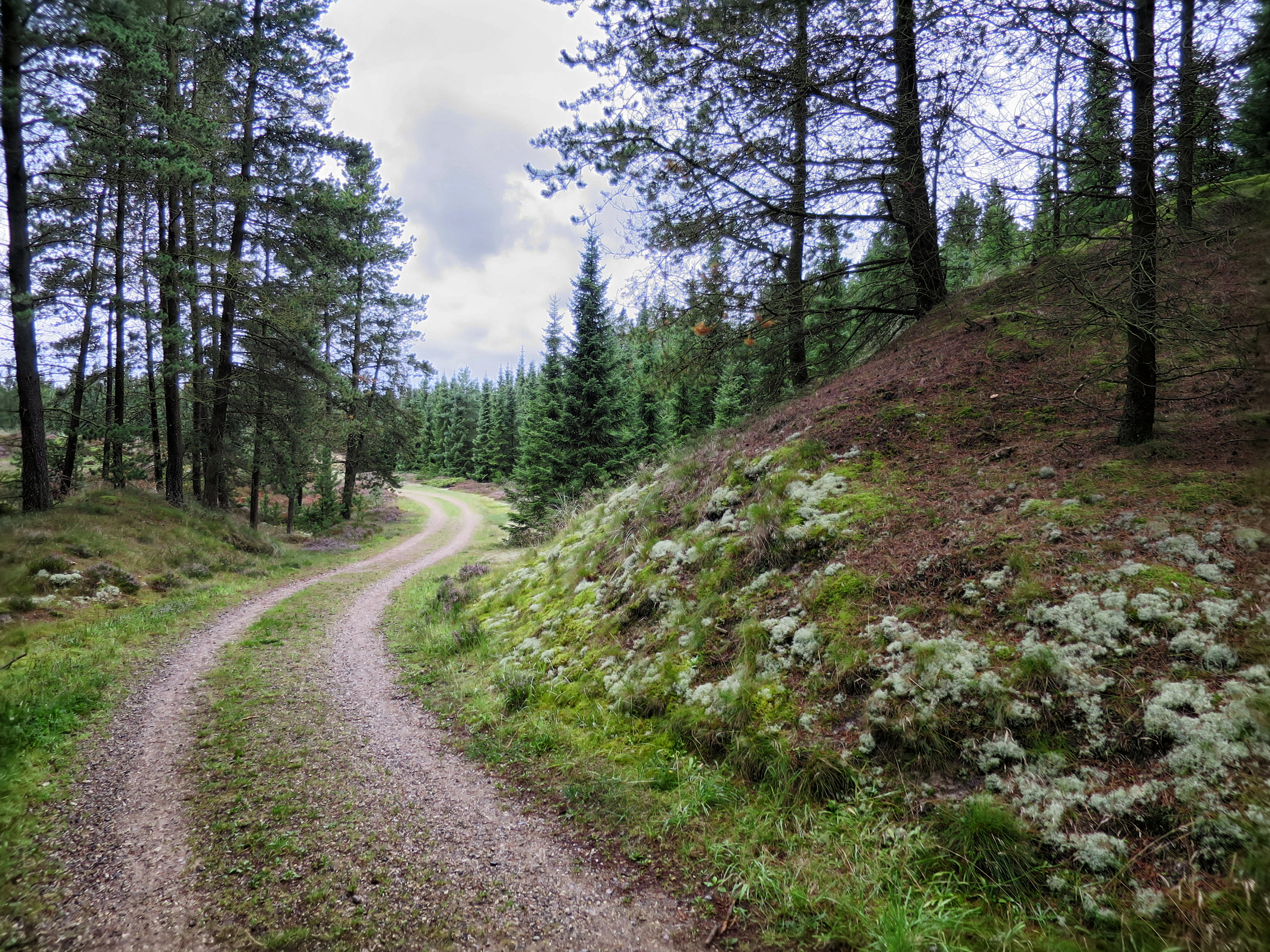
The West Coast Route at Jammerbugten

The Danish National Cycle Routes (Danish: Danmarks nationale cykelruter) together form the national cycling route network of Denmark. There are currently 11 such long-distance cycling routes across Denmark largely established mainly to promote bicycle tourism. There are over 10,000 kilometres (6,200 mi) of marked bicycle routes in Denmark.

== Routes ==
There are 11 National Cycle Routes in Denmark.

Number	Start	End	Name	Distance	Cities	% Sealed
1	Skagen	Rudbøl	Vestkystruten	560 km		70%
2	Hanstholm	Copenhagen		420 km		80%
3	Skagen	Padborg Crosses the border to Germany on the Hærvejen/Ochsenweg - border between Danish, Padborg and German, Harrislee	Hærvejsruten	450 km		78%
4	Søndervig	Copenhagen	Cycle Route 4	310 km		90%
5	Skagen	Sønderborg	Østkystruten	650 km	Frederikshavn, Aarhus, Vejle	90%
6	Esbjerg	Copenhagen		330 km		92%
7	Sjællands Odde	Rødbyhavn		240 km		90%
8	Rudbøl	Møn	Sydhavsruten	360 km		95%
9	Helsingør	Gedser		290 km		92%
10	Rønne	Rønne	Bornholm rundt	105 km		90%
12	Aalborg	Aalborg	Limfjordsruten	610 km		90%

== See also ==
- Cycling in Denmark
- National cycling route network
- EuroVelo
