= Danish National Cycle Route 1 =

Cycle route in Denmark

Sign

Danish national cycle route 1, known as the Vestkystruten (West Coast Route), is the first of the 11 Danish National Cycle Routes. It runs from the Danish-German border at Rudbøl in Southern Jutland to Skagen, at the northernmost tip of Vendsyssel island. It follows the west coast of Jutland and is 560 km (350 mi) long, with 70% of this distance being along paved roads.

It is part of EuroVelo 12 AKA the North Sea Cycle Route.

== Route ==
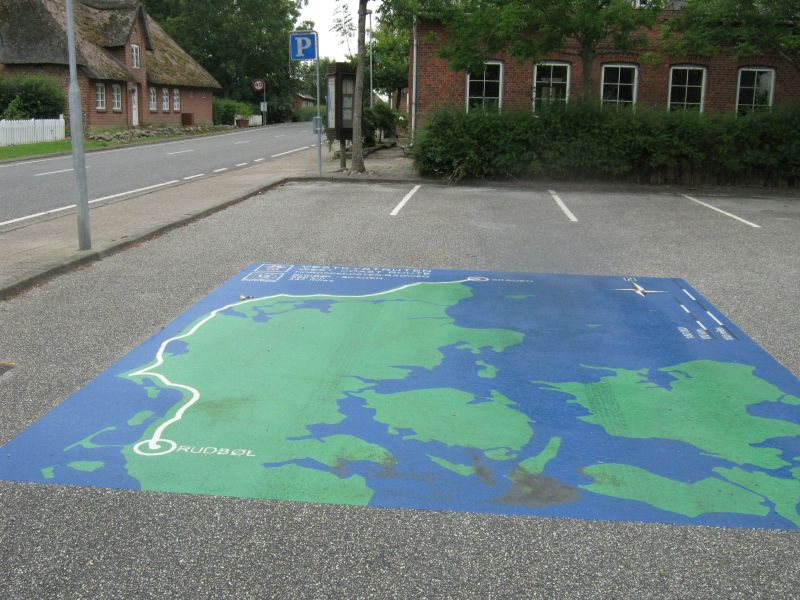
Map of Vestkystruten in Rudbøl

The route starts at Rudbøl, a small village on the Danish-German border which is also the starting-point of Danish National Cycle Route 8 (the South Sea Route). From here it runs north through Skærbæk, Esbjerg, Hvide Sande, and Thyborøn where there is a ferry-crossing to the island of Vendsyssel. Beyond the ferry-crossing the route continues northward through Hanstholm and Hirtshals before ending in Skagen.

== See also ==
- Danish National Cycle Routes
