= Bawdsey =

Village in Suffolk, England

Coordinates: 52.009°N 1.422°E

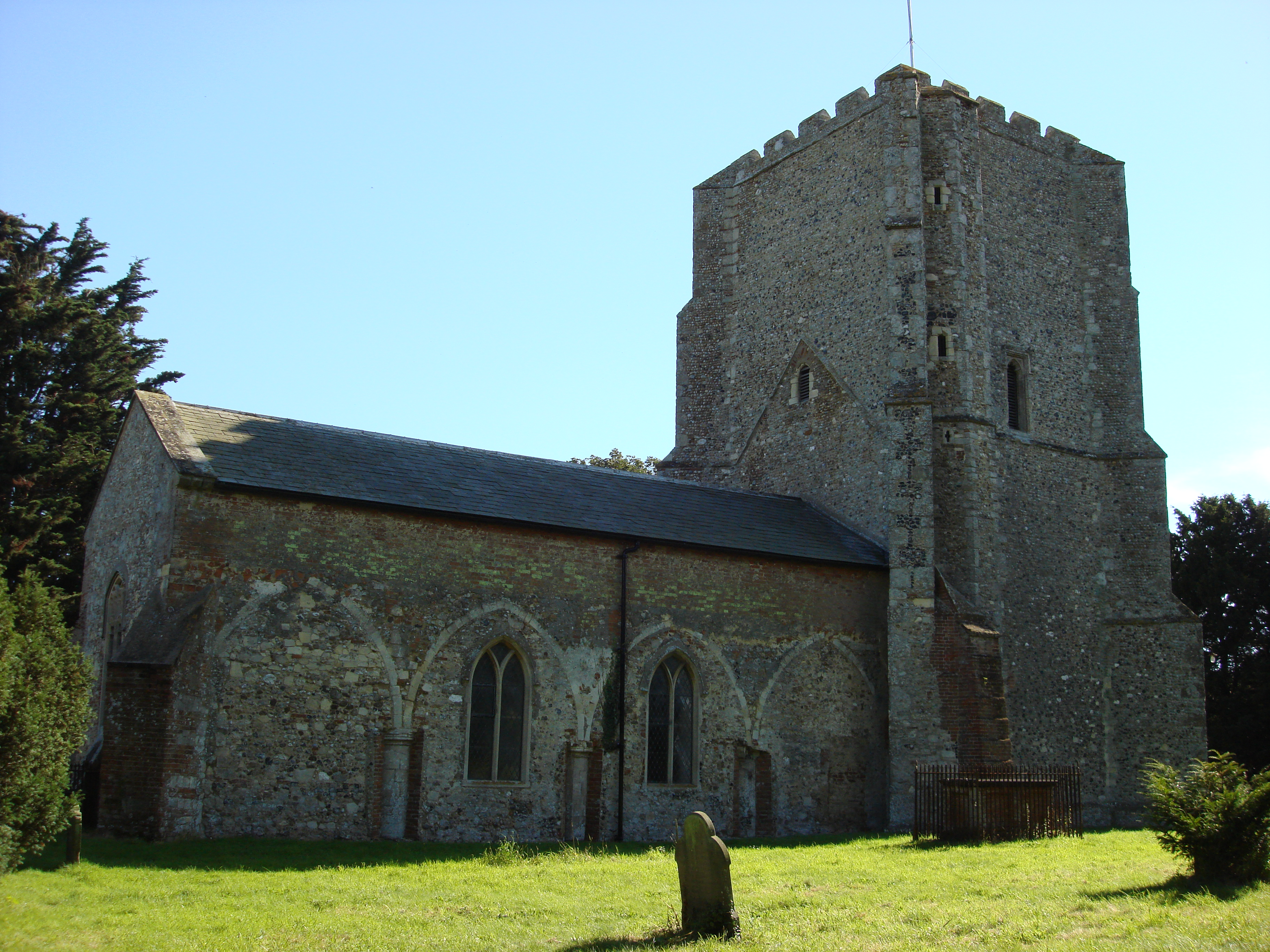
- Saint Mary's Church, Bawdsey

- Location within Suffolk
- Interactive map of Bawdsey
- Population: 276 (2011)
- OS grid reference: TM348400
- District: East Suffolk
- Shire county: Suffolk
- Region: East
- Country: England
- Sovereign state: United Kingdom
- Post town: Woodbridge
- Postcode district: IP12

Bawdsey (/ˈbɔdzɪ/) is a village and civil parish in Suffolk, eastern England. It is situated on the other side of the mouth of River Deben from Felixstowe. It had an estimated population of 340 in 2007, reducing to 276 at the Census 2011.

Bawdsey Manor was the location RAF Bawdsey where the United Kingdom's Air Ministry started research into the military application of radar in 1936, prior to World War II. Following the outbreak of the War in September 1939, the research was moved to Worth Matravers near Swanage in May 1940, and from there to Malvern, Worcestershire in 1942. Bawdsey had both Chain Home and Chain Home Low early warning radar stations during World War II.

The World War Two defences constructed around Bawdsey Point have been documented. They included a number of pillboxes, landmines and flame fougasse installations. The beaches were protected with extensive barriers of scaffolding.

Saint Mary's church is a grade II* listed building. Originally dating from the 14th century, the church was greatly rebuilt after 1842 when it had been burnt as a result of fireworks being let off from the tower on 5 November.

== Ecological importance ==
Bawdsey is located on the northern bank of the Deben Estuary where it reaches the North Sea. It is adjacent to two Sites of Special Scientific Interest:

- Bawdsey Cliff is a Site of Special Scientific Interest which runs along the shore line to the east of Bawdsey. It is noted for its geological importance. It is 23.3 hectares (58 acres) in size and provides over 2 kilometres (1.2 mi) of exposed Gelasian (early Pleistocene) Red Crag, the most significant exposure of Red Crag in England.
- Deben Estuary SSSI

== Gallery ==
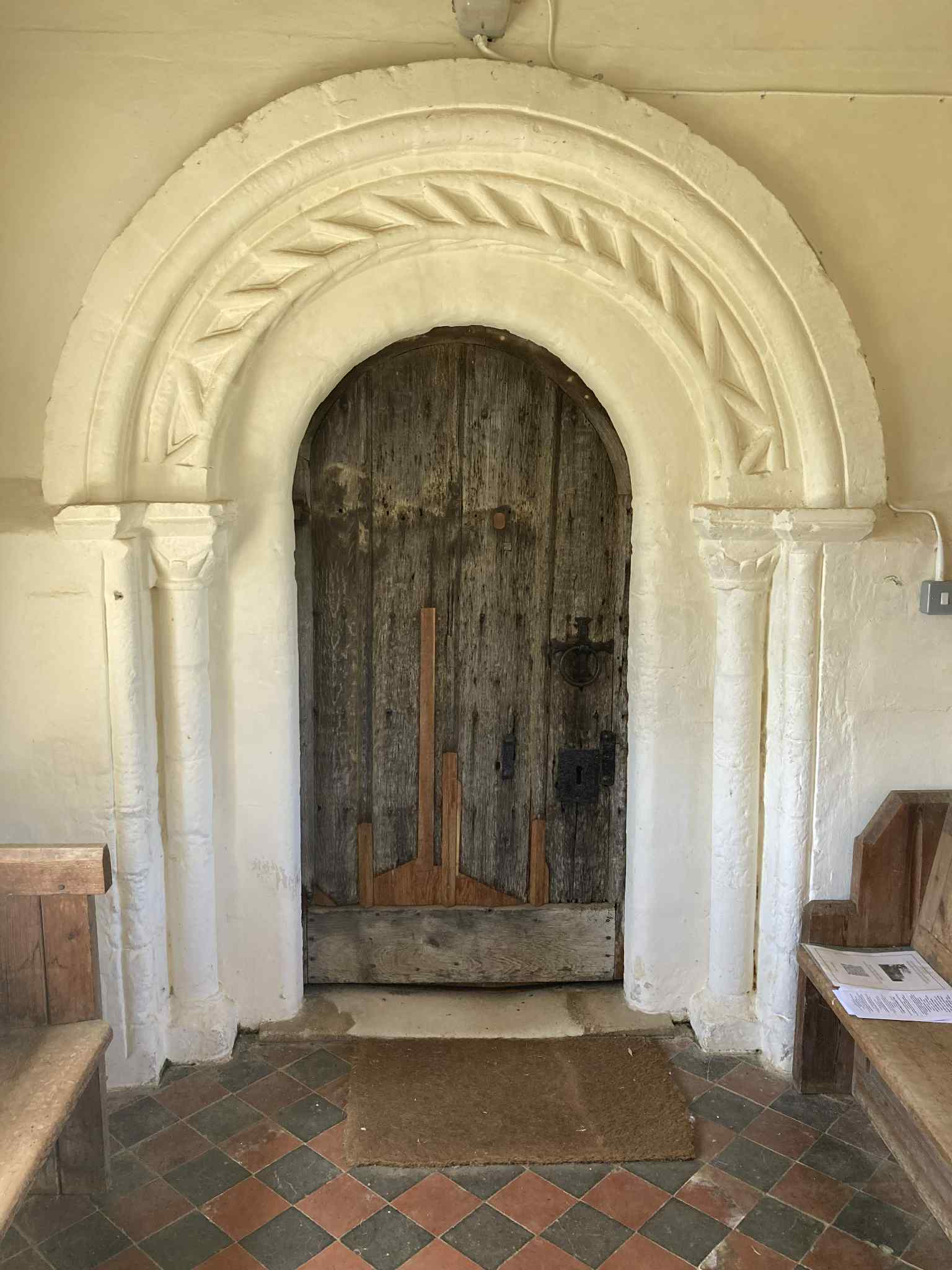
St Mary's church, west door

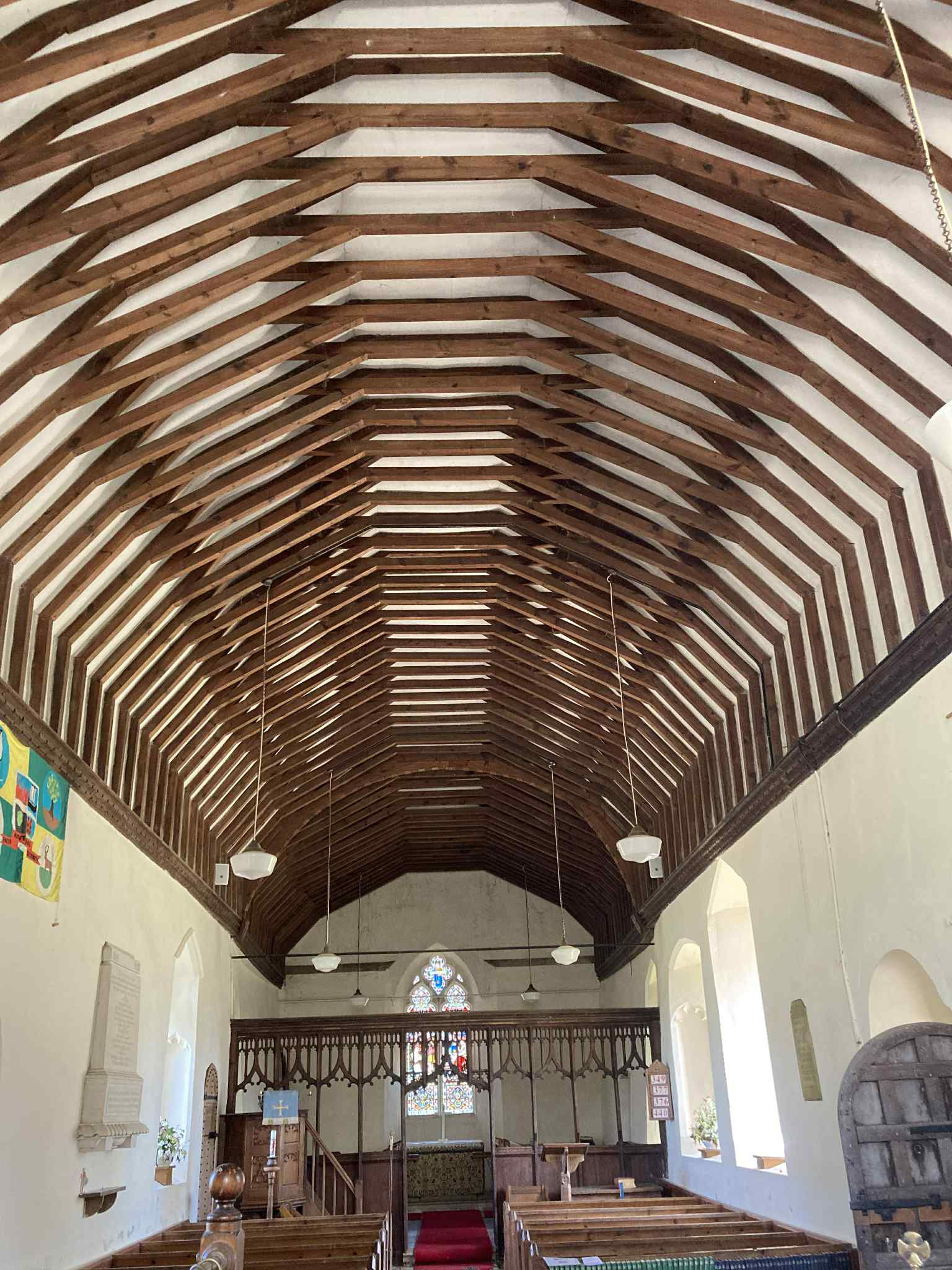
St Mary's church, ceiling

== See also ==
- Telecommunications Research Establishment
- Deben Estuary
