= EV12 North Sea Cycle Route =

European cycling route

- Logo of the North Sea Cycle Route
- Length: 5,932 km (3,686 mi)
- Designation: European Cyclists' Federation
- Trailheads: Bergen, Norway to Shetland Islands, UK
- Use: cycling
- Website: eurovelo.com/en/eurovelos/eurovelo-12
Trail map

The North Sea Cycle Route (EuroVelo 12) as of May 2009. The Belgian & Scottish Islands sections are not shown.

EuroVelo 12 (EV12), the North Sea Cycle Route, is a 5,942 km (3,692 mi) long-distance cycling route circuit around the coastlines of the countries that border the North Sea: these countries are (going clockwise from an arbitrary starting point of Harwich in Essex) England, Scotland, Norway, Sweden, Denmark, Germany, the Netherlands and Belgium.

The North Sea Cycle Route was officially opened in 2001, and is an international project between the countries participating, with 68 partners in 8 countries. In 2003, the route was awarded a Guinness world record certificate confirming that the North Sea Cycle Route was the world's longest cycle route.

== Route ==
The route starting from the Shetland islands towards Norway would go through the countries in the following order:

=== Scotland ===
The Scottish section of the North Sea Cycle Route follows the British National Cycle Route 1 (NCR 1) from the English border to Thurso on the north-east tip of the Scottish mainland. From the nearby port of Scrabster the route continues via ferry services to Stromness in Orkney and from there to Shetland. From there the route starts up again in Norway.

(The ferry service linking Lerwick in Shetland with Bergen in Norway has been discontinued. The alternative is the summer-only twice-weekly flights from Sumburgh Airport south of Lerwick to Bergen in Norway, operated by Loganair.)

=== England ===
Heading clockwise, starting at the English portside town of Harwich takes you through the following route. Travellers from the Continent would typically begin the English section of the North Sea Cycle Route at Harwich International Port in Parkeston. From there, there is a signposted route that meets the National Cycle Network's NCR51 in a park to the south of Dovercourt station. The route is then signposted as NCR51 south-east to Colchester where it then follows National Cycle Route 1. Once on NCR 1, this route takes you all the way to the Scottish border.

An alternative route from Harwich is to take the National Cycle Route 51 in the other direction, then take a (seasonal) foot ferry north using NCR 51 to Felixstowe and then either head directly for the NCR1 using Regional Cycle Route 41 to Woodbridge or take a more scenic route using RCR41 up the Suffolk coast and join NCR1 near Saxmundham.

=== Belgium ===
The Belgian section of the North Sea Cycle Route has been added in at a later date. It basically continues to follow the LF1 from the Netherlands and goes from Knokke in the Zwin region through to Ostend, to Nieuwpoort and to De Panne close to the border with France. (The LF1 ultimately terminates at Boulogne-sur-Mer in France.)

=== Netherlands ===
The Dutch section of the North Sea Cycle Route is approximately 585 km (364 mi) long and follows two national LF-routes, the LF10 (Waddenzeeroute) and the LF1 (Noordzeeroute), starting at the German border at Nieuweschans to Sluis near the Belgian border.

The LF10 starts from Nieuweschans near the German border and continues 275 km (171 mi) to Callantsoog. The route passes along the Groningen and Frisian coast, through pastures, and past former villages, inland seas, stinzen, mounds and basalt dikes. Highlights include the former island of Wieringen in North Holland, part of the route, Lauwersmeer National Park. The route also passes over all ports with ferry connections to the Dutch Wadden Sea. A little "island hopping" to Vlieland and Schiermonnikoog is easily possible.

From Callantsoog, the route follows the LF1 from nearby Den Helder and continues 310 km (190 mi) to Sluis near the Belgian border.

Before the Belgian sections were included, the North Sea Cycle Route originally terminated at the Hook of Holland where passenger ferries sail to the English port of Harwich, thus completing the circuit of the North Sea Cycle Route.

=== Germany ===
The German section of the North Sea Cycle Route follows the German Cycling Network's D1 route. This route follows for the most part the North Sea coast through rural areas, but also passes several towns and cities. It goes through various parts of the Wadden Sea landscape and varied inland landscapes.

=== Denmark ===
The Danish section of the North Sea Cycle Route follows two routes of the Danish National Cycle Routes network, routes 5 and 1. It starts just across the channel from Sweden at the Danish port of Grenå on the Djursland peninsula. Following national route 5 it travels north to Skagen. From Skagen it continues south along the west coast following route 1 all the way to the town of Rudbøl on the German border.

=== Sweden ===
The Swedish section of the North Sea Cycle Route is 380 km (240 mi) and follows the west coast of Sweden through the counties of Halland and Västra Götaland.

From Norway, the route starts at Svinesund and follows the Cykelspåret cycling route through the province of Bohuslän towards Gothenburg. The navigation signs of the Cykelspåret cycling route are badly maintained, which makes additional GPS-navigation necessary. From Gothenburg, it follows the Ginstleden and Cykelspåret Väst cycling routes southwards to the port of Varberg. From there the route departs Sweden with the ferry to Grenå in Denmark.

=== Norway ===
The Norwegian section of the North Sea Cycle Route starts in Bergen, and exits to Sweden at Svinesund. The route follows the southern coastline, and is approx 1000 kilometres long. Along the route several towns are visited, among them Haugesund, Stavanger, Kristiansand, Arendal, Larvik, Sandefjord, Tønsberg, Fredrikstad and Sarpsborg.

The whole route is marked with a sign that reads 1, as it shares its route with the Norwegian National Cycle Route 1.

Because former ferry routes have been replaced with tunnels forbidden for bicycles, the route is now moving far into the inland east of Stavanger in order to still reach Bergen. Even this route might be changed, because it uses the ferry from Stavanger to Tau, which has been replaced by the 14 km Ryfylke Tunnel, which is forbidden for bicycles.

== See also ==
- EuroVelo
- North Sea

== Travelogues ==
- Friend, Bernie, Cycling Back to Happiness - Adventure on the North Sea Cycle Route, ISBN 978-1-906206-71-0.
