= National Cycle Route 51 =

Long distance cycle route in England

National Cycle Route 51 is an English long-distance cycle route running broadly east–west connecting Colchester and the port of Harwich to Oxford via Ipswich, Bury St Edmunds, Cambridge, Bedford, Milton Keynes, Bicester, and Kidlington. It runs for 189.3 miles for the full route.

Links to:

- National Cycle Route 1 at Colchester and Ipswich
- National Cycle Route 6 at Milton Keynes
- RCR 41 at Felixstowe
- NCR 11 at Cambridge
- NCR 12 at Huntingdon
- National Cycle Route 50 near Verney Junction

Forms part of the North Sea Cycle Route.

== Route ==
=== Colchester to Harwich ===
Colchester | Wivenhoe | Great Oakley | Harwich

This section runs from Colchester and National Cycle Route 1 to Harwich, where a seasonal foot ferry can be caught to Suffolk where the line continues.

For much of its length it is also the route of the North Sea Cycle Route, although this branches off at a park in Dovercourt to head to the Harwich International Port at Parkeston where there is access via ferry to the Continent.

At Harwich the signs indicate the route is 22 miles to Colchester, 3 to the International Port and 1 to Dovercourt. The North Sea Cycle Route junction is 1 mile along the route from Harwich to Colchester.

=== Harwich to Ipswich ===
Harwich | Felixstowe | Nacton | Ipswich

The route from Harwich to Felixstowe uses the Harwich Harbour Ferry (summer only, check timetable) to Langard Point offering an impressive view of The Port of Felixstowe.

On the Felixstowe side the ferry lands near Landguard Fort which is rich with history. The route then heads along the sea front into the centre of Old Felixstowe itself, a Victorian seaside town.

From Felixstowe the route heads out of town though a residential area and then mainly along minor roads towards Ipswich. There is a 1400-metre section of the official route takes one along a dedicated cycletrack very close to the A14. For this section there is an alternative route that uses a narrow single track road further away from the A14 which is also used by motorists and buses. The route then heads through Statton Hall, Levington and Nacton into Ipswich via Landseer Park, Holywells Park and the new waterfront area, where the routes crosses National Cycle Route 1.

Alternatively from Felixstowe one can take the RCR41 up the coast through the Suffolk Coast and Heaths Area of Outstanding Natural Beauty.

=== Ipswich to Bury St Edmunds ===
Ipswich | Needham Market | Stowmarket | Woolpit | Tostock | Thurston | Bury St Edmunds

This section of the route uses quiet roads passing the entrance to the Museum of East Anglian Life in Stowmarket, the village of Shelland and then through Thurston using a couple of off-road sections and finally into Bury St Edmunds using another section of off-road good cycle track running parallel with the road.

In late 2008/early 2009 part a section for the route west of Stowmarket was re-routed to take advantage of changes to the A14. It now uses a section of road that used to form the Eastbound carriageway of the A14 at Haughley Bends and has been turned into a traffic free route for cyclists, walkers and horse riders as shown on the official map of the works.

=== Bury St Edmunds to Cambridge ===
Bury St Edmunds | Newmarket | Burwell | Cambridge

Links to NCR 11 at Burwell and Cambridge

=== Cambridge to Bedford ===
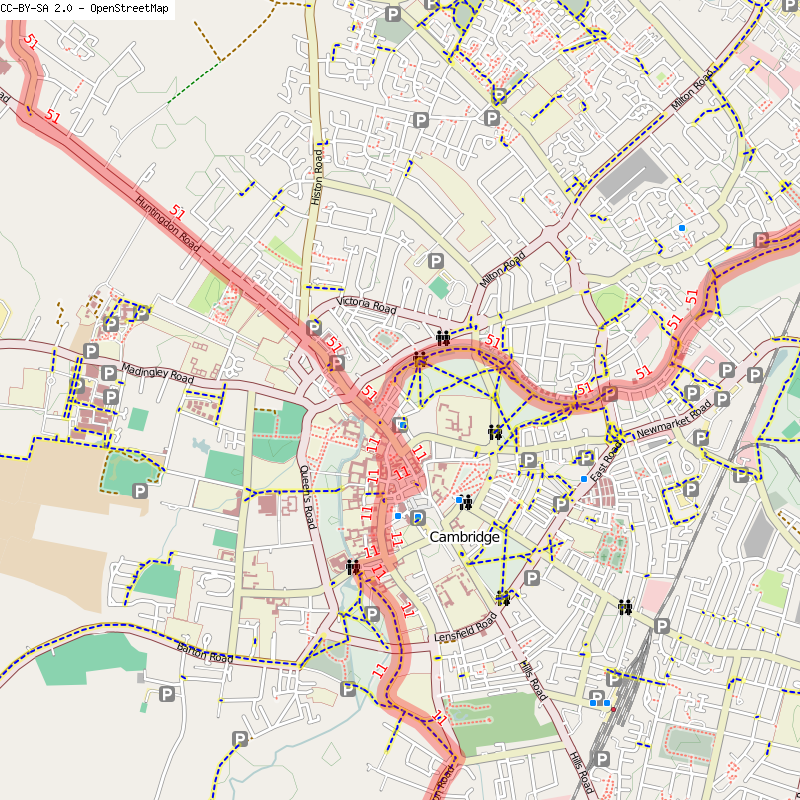
NCR 51 route through Cambridge city centre

Cambridge | Girton | Swavesey | Huntingdon | Sandy | Bedford

NCR 51 leaves Cambridge crossing the A14 near Histon, routing north to St Ives adjacent to the Cambridgeshire Guided Busway, passing near Oakington and Swavesey, (adjacent to a guided bus route, no vehicles). Then via the old stone bridge from St Ives to Hemingford Abbots and Grey, then via Cow lane into Godmanchester and generally east towards Huntingdon railway station.

At Huntingdon, it loses its identity, merging with NCR 12 (London–Grimsby) as far as Great Barford (between Sandy and Bedford.

From here, the route follows the trackbed of the old Varsity Line, now a rail trail, briefly joining the public highway at the village of Blunham, past Willington and the wetlands around Priory Marina, before arriving at the outskirts of Bedford where it follows the south bank of the River Great Ouse through parkland to the south end of Bedford Bridge.

=== Bedford to Milton Keynes ===
Bedford | Cranfield | Milton Keynes

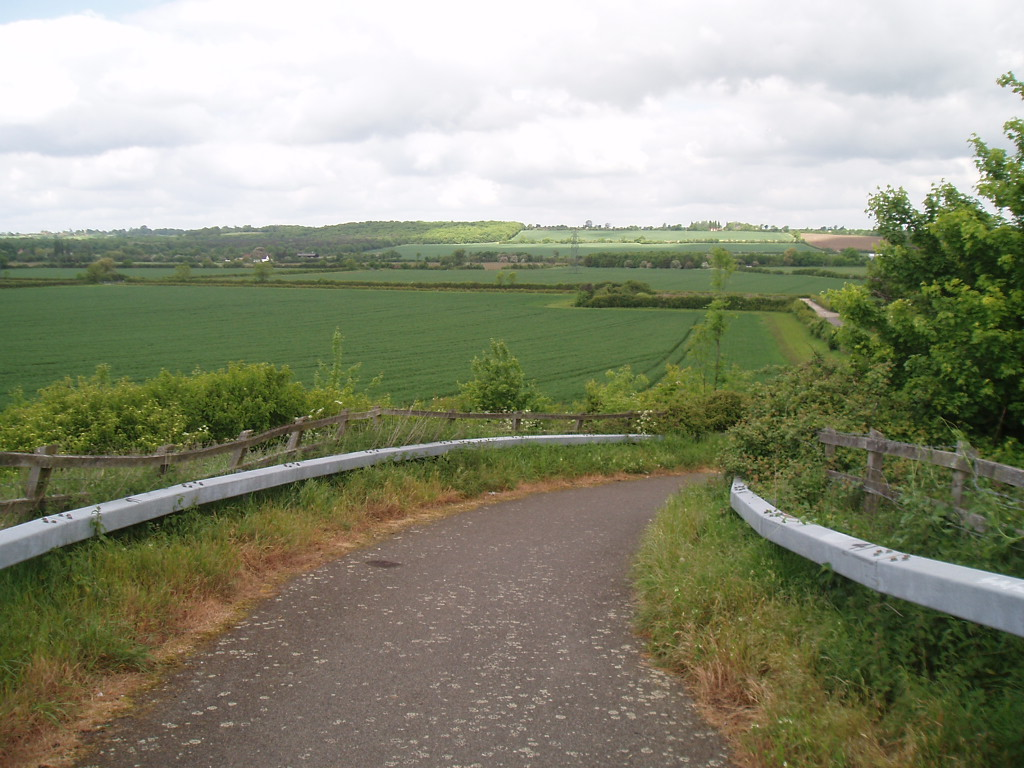
Section from Marston Moretaine to Cranfield

From Bedford, the route follows the north bank of the River Great Ouse through town, passing under County Bridge at Prebend Street, and following a surfaced path along the river before crossing the river into Kempston at a footbridge. This section is prone to flooding, and an alternative cycle route is available by crossing County Bridge and following Prebend Street south to the Bedford Road cycleway.

NCR 51 follows a split cycle path (pedestrians/cycles separated by solid white line) through Kempston, past a supermarket, and through alleyways to Ridgeway School.

From the limits of Kempston, there is a well-marked route on roads, crossing the Bedford western bypass via Wootton to Marston Moretaine

The route travels through the Forest of Marston Vale (bike hire in the Forest centre) where there is a cycleway connecting with Millbrook railway station.

From the Forest of Marston Vale, NCR 51 takes residential roads, tracks, and bridleways to Cranfield

At Cranfield, there are no further NCR signs westbound until Salford, where the route crosses the M1 towards Wavendon and Woburn Sands (in the Milton Keynes Urban Area).

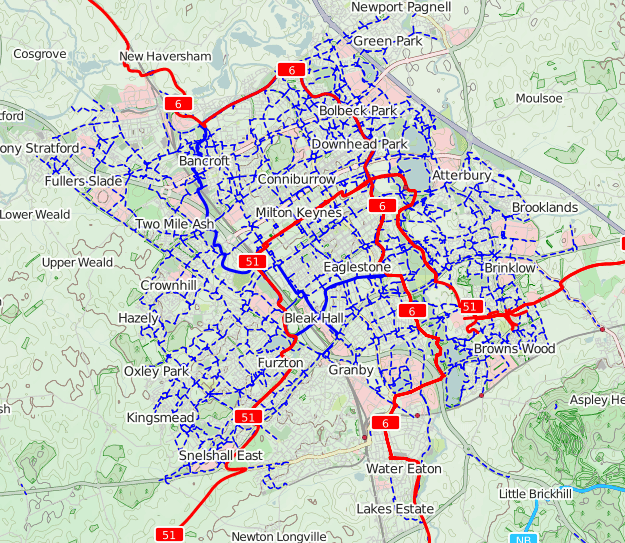
Cycleway network in Milton Keynes. NCR routes 6 and 51 are highlighted in red. (Openstreetmap.org)

Entering the eastern edge of Milton Keynes, the route follows Lower End Road (Wavendon) and then Walton Road (Wavendon Gate, Milton Keynes), then onwards along the Milton Keynes redway system (a segregated shared path (cycleway and footpath) network) around the south edge of Willen Lake (where there is some bike hire, tourist attractions etc.). A little further on (at the bottom of Campbell Park), it meets National Cycle Route 6 that leads to London and Northampton. Climbing through Campbell Park, it enters the central business district of Milton Keynes then follows Midsummer Boulevard down to Milton Keynes Central railway station.

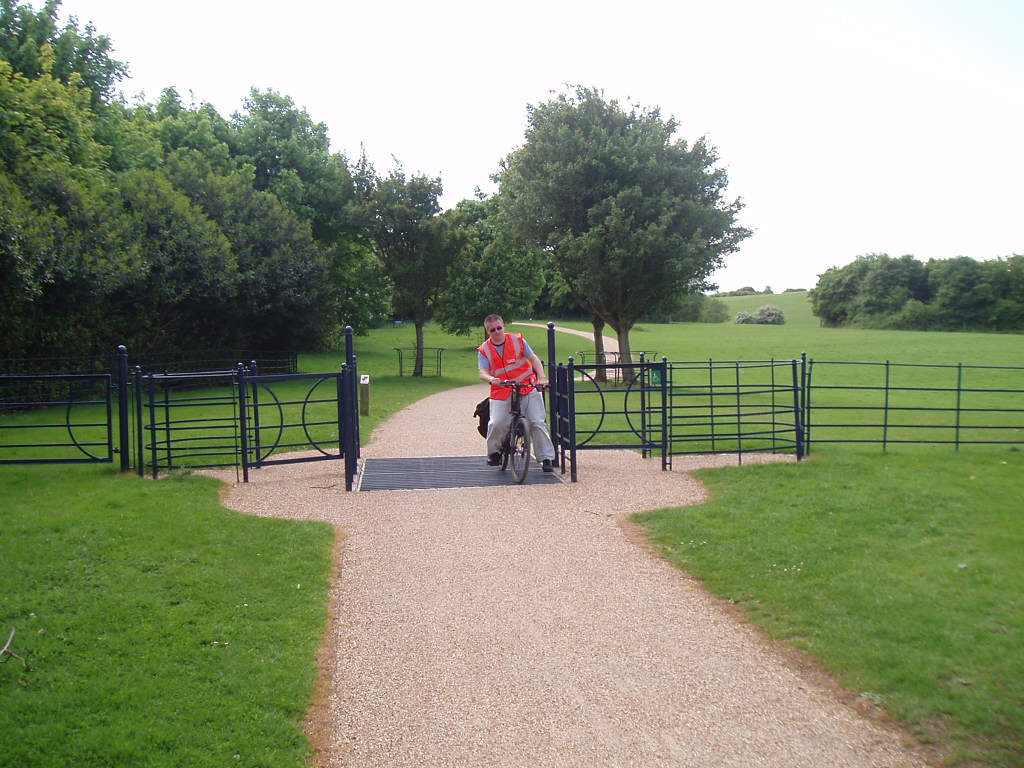
NCR51 crosses a cattle grid in a sheep-grazed linear park in Milton Keynes

=== Milton Keynes to Oxford ===
Milton Keynes | Winslow | Bicester | Oxford

From Milton Keynes Central railway station, the route goes over the West Coast Main Line on a pedestrian/cycle bridge, and follows paved routes in parkland past the National Bowl and Furzton Lake to the A421 junction with Buckingham Road in West Bletchley. There is a cycleway here along Buckingham Road to link with Bletchley railway station.

Leaving Milton Keynes, the NCR 51 continues south-west along bridleways to Winslow. Onwards from Winslow, the route reaches Verney Junction and a little further on it interconnects with National Cycle Route 50 for Buckingham and Daventry. Minor roads then take it through Middle Claydon (from whence a short diversion may be made to Claydon House, a National Trust property). Next comes Steeple Claydon and then onwards to Bicester.

In Bicester, there are local routes to Bicester North railway station and Bicester Village railway station. Thereafter, a minor road beside the A41 takes it through Wendlebury, Weston on the Green, Bletchingdon, Kidlington, and then on into Oxford.
