= RAF Bawdsey =

Former RAF station in Suffolk, England

RAF Bawdsey
- Near Felixstowe, Suffolk in England
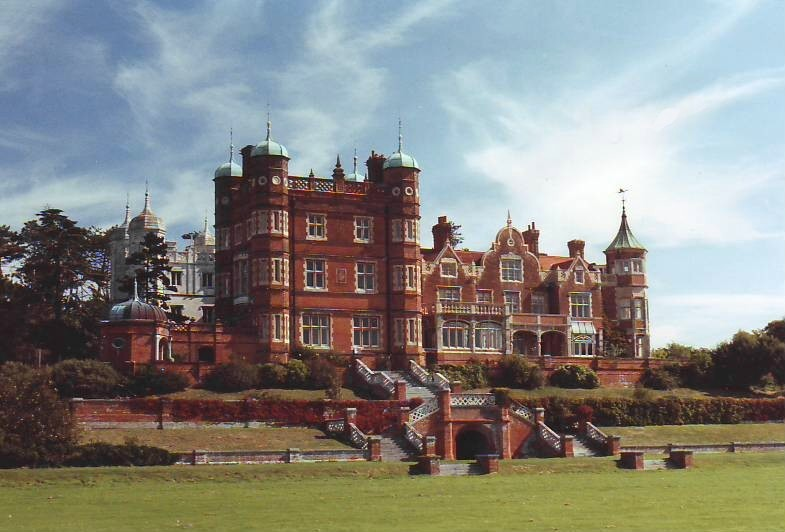
- The manor building at RAF Bawdsey during 1992

- First in the field

Site information
- Type: Royal Air Force station
- Owner: Ministry of Defence
- Operator: Royal Air Force
- Condition: Closed

Location
- Shown within Suffolk
- Coordinates: 51°59′32″N 001°24′10″E

Site history
- Built: 1936
- In use: 1936–1991
- Fate: Converted into a boarding school which operated between 1994 and 2016 and later a holiday park. Transmitter block now a radar museum.

Royal Air Force Bawdsey or more simply RAF Bawdsey is a former Royal Air Force station situated on the eastern coast in Suffolk, England. Also known as Bawdsey Research Station (BRS), the first Chain Home radar station was built there, characterized by eight tall masts, four for transmitting and four for receiving. When the research group moved to Dundee in September 1939, the radar station was left active under the name RAF Bawdsey. The site later hosted a Bristol Bloodhound surface-to-air missile station until 1990, with the station closing in 1991.

== History ==
Bawdsey Manor, dating from 1886, was taken over in March 1936 by the Air Ministry for developing the Chain Home (CH) RDF (radar) system. The station's Superintendent was initially Robert Watson-Watt, later followed by A. P. Rowe. The experimental radar station was located just northeast of the Manor, about 200 yards (180 m) distant. When war was declared in September 1939, fears of a possible commando raid on the group led to the development activities being relocated, first to Dundee, Scotland, and later to Worth Matravers near Swanage in Dorset on the southern coast of England, where they became the Telecommunications Research Establishment (TRE).

In the 1950s, the Bawdsey CH station was upgraded as part of the ROTOR programme and gained an underground control centre with living quarters and air filtration to make it capable of operating during nuclear attack. The command centre was accessed by way of a small bungalow which can be seen on the left of the road which runs from Bawdsey village to Bawdsey Manor.

The station was stood down for a number of years, but was re-opened in 1978 as a Bloodhound missile site, with the launchers located just to the northwest of the CH site. The missiles were moved to RAF West Raynham in July 1990 and the station closed in March 1991.

== Current use ==
The remains of the site are still fairly well preserved and will undergo restoration in 2017 due to a £1.4 million Lottery Grant.

== See also ==
- History of Radar
- Robert Watson-Watt
