= River Deben =

River in Suffolk, England

Deben
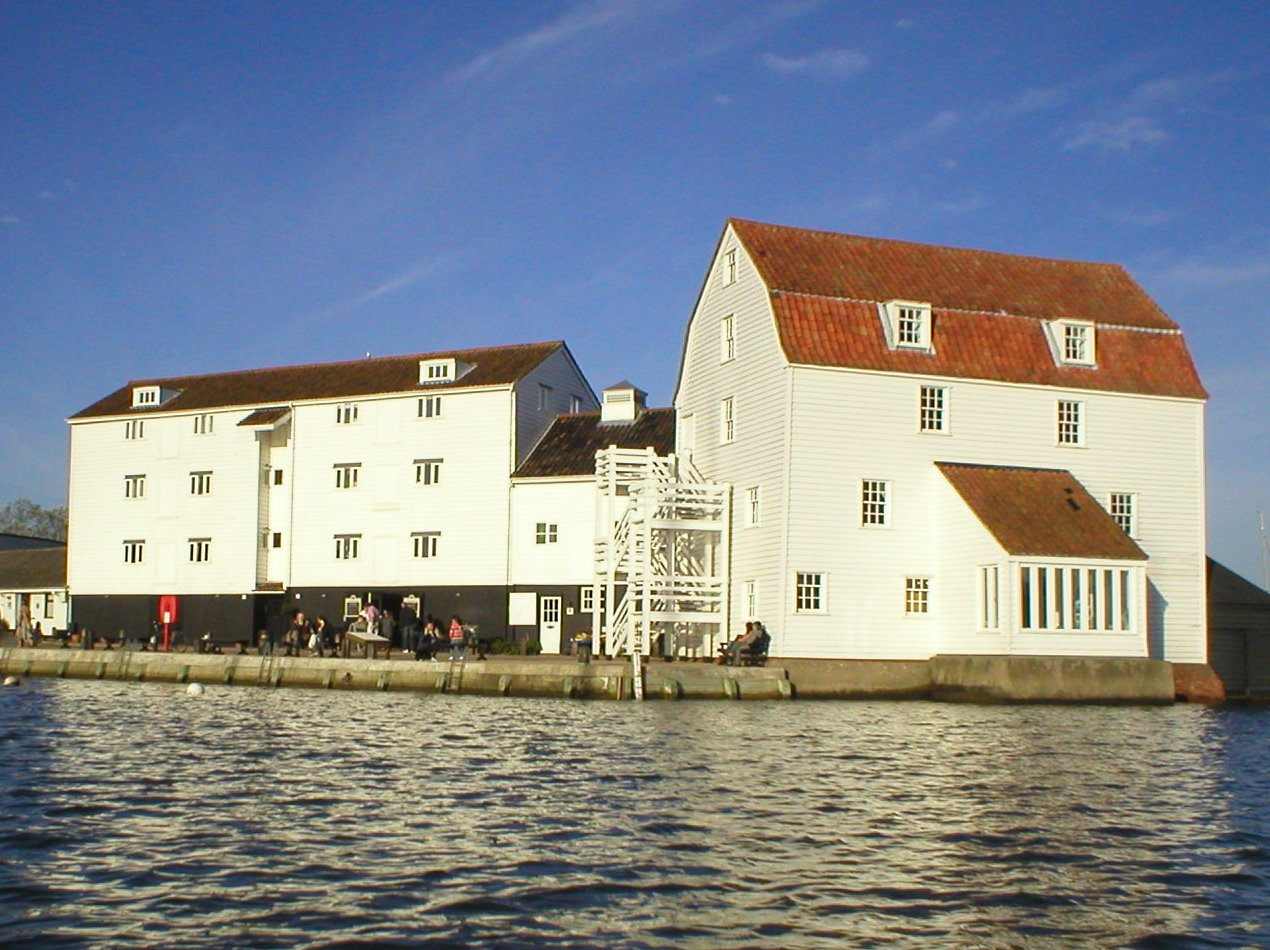
- Woodbridge Tide Mill from the River Deben

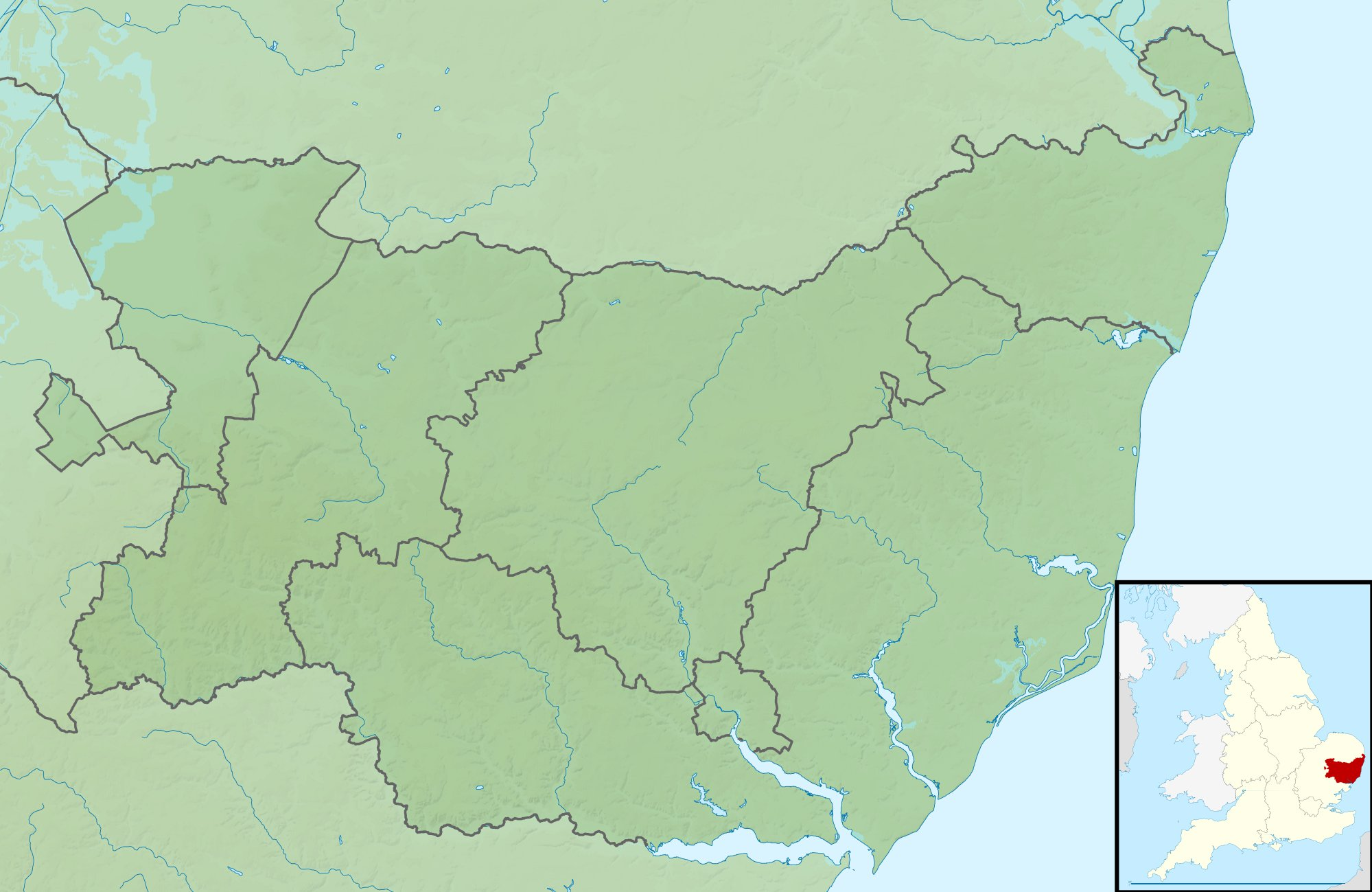
- Location of the river mouth within Suffolk

Location
- Country: England
- Region: Suffolk

Physical characteristics
- Source: Bedingfield
  - coordinates: 52.2594°N 1.1873°E
  - elevation: 60 m (200 ft)
- 2nd source: Debenham
  - coordinates: 52.2263°N 1.1336°E
  - elevation: 54 m (177 ft)
- Mouth: North Sea near Felixstowe
  - coordinates: 51.9808°N 1.3927°E
  - elevation: 0 m (0 ft)
- Length: 54 km (34 mi)

Basin features
- Tributaries
  - right: River Fynn; Bucklesham Mill River

The River Deben is a river in Suffolk, England. It rises to the west of Debenham in central Suffolk, though a second, higher source runs south from the parish of Bedingfield. The river passes through the port town of Woodbridge, turning into a tidal estuary before entering the North Sea at Felixstowe Ferry. The mouth of the estuary is crossed by a ferry connecting Felixstowe and Bawdsey.

== History ==
Both the river's name and the name of the village of Debenham are of uncertain origin and relationship, but one theory is that the river's name was originally Dēope meaning 'the deep one'. The name, however, is not recorded in the form Deben before 1735, when it appears thus in Kirby's Suffolk Traveller. The river, though still little more than a stream, is forded twice in the village, with that which runs along Stoney Lane being claimed to be among the longest in England.

== Course of the River Deben ==
=== River Deben Estuary ===
Tide mills at Woodbridge have operated off the tide from the river Deben since at least 1170. The present mill, built in 1793, produces stone ground wholemeal flour. It marks the point from which the River Deben flows into the Deben Estuary. In 2009, the Deben Estuary Partnership was developed to enable the local communities to have an input into complex and increasingly important issues that will be crucial for the River Deben and the surrounding estuary area. In 2015, the Deben Estuary Plan was drawn up following feedback.

The Deben Estuary is a Special Protection Area and Ramsar site and within the Suffolk & Essex Coast & Heaths National Landscape. Its significance arises from its overwintering population of avocets (Recurvirostra avosetta). The estuary features shifting sandbanks. Plant life is dominated by the common reed (Phragmites australis). The salt marsh and intertidal mud-flats that occupy most of the area have the widest range of salt marsh flora in Suffolk.

== Water resource management ==
Water resource management has evolved in relation to the River Deben. Since 2023 the East Suffolk Water Management Board has been responsible for this. It traces its origin to the English internal drainage boards established in 1933. The "River Deben (upper) Internal Drainage Board" and the "River Deben (lower) Internal Drainage Board' were established at this time, and were responsible for water management until amalgamation in 2005.

== Leisure ==
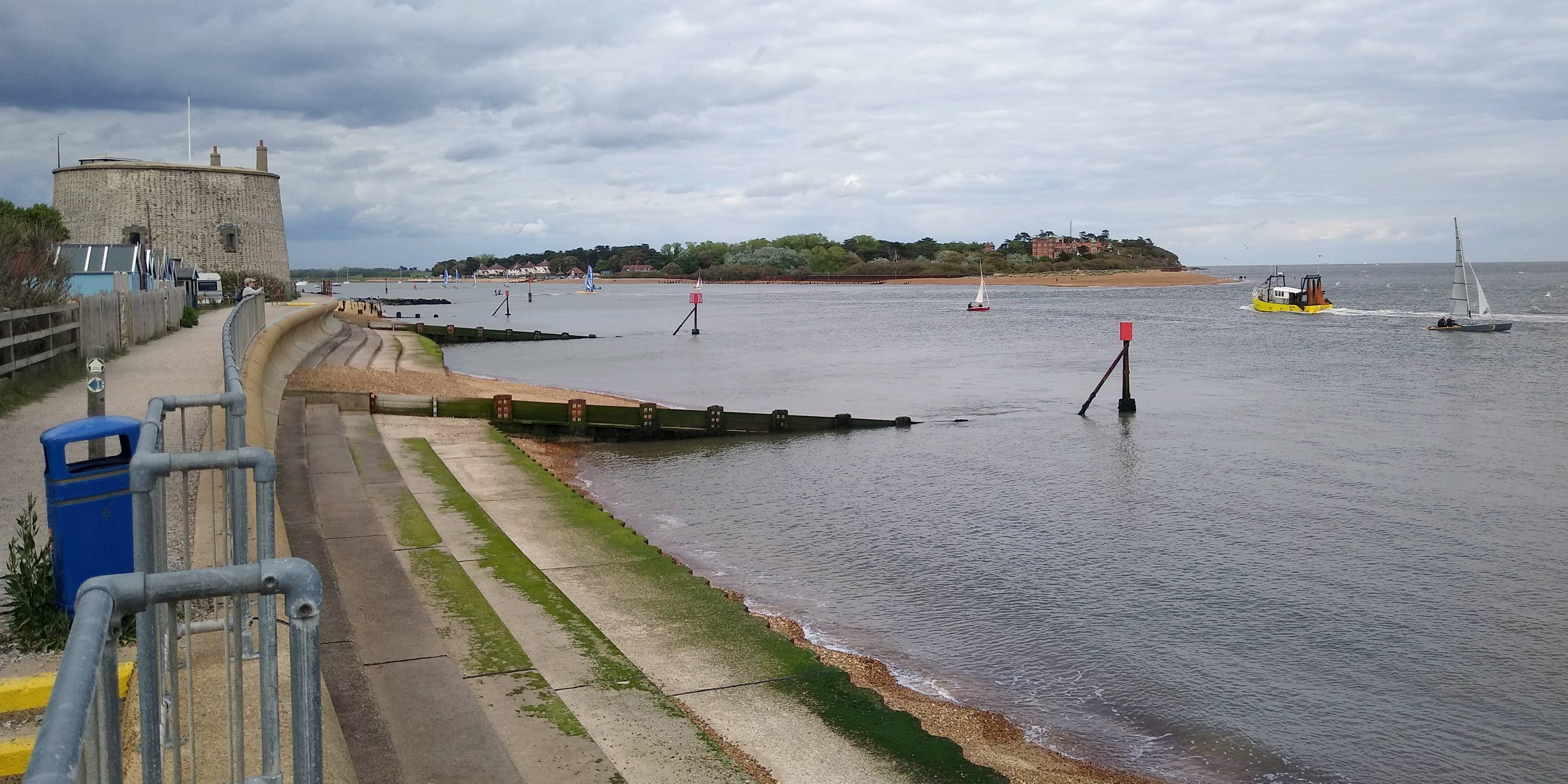
A Martello tower and the mouth of River Deben at Felixstowe Ferry in June 2019

There are several yacht and dinghy clubs on the river Deben. These include the Deben Rowing Club, Deben Yacht Club, the Waldringfield Sailing Club, Felixstowe Ferry Sailing Club and the Woodbridge Cruising Club. There are two yacht harbours, the Tidemill Yacht Harbour, close to the Tide Mill; and the Granary Yacht Harbour, further upstream at Melton.

The river Deben is a popular location for many other water sports including canoeing, wakeboarding, paddle boarding and windsurfing. The area where the river Deben enters the North Sea at Felixstowe Ferry is also a popular location for kiteboarding.

== Peninsula ==
The Deben Peninsula is a region of Suffolk made up of the area of the Coast and Heaths National Landscape between the River Deben to the south and the Alde and Ore Estuary in the north. The area is relatively remote, and noted for its coastline.

== See also ==
- Bawdsey Ferry
- River Alde
