= Carlton, Suffolk =

Village in Suffolk, England

Coordinates: 52.225°N 1.494°E

Carlton
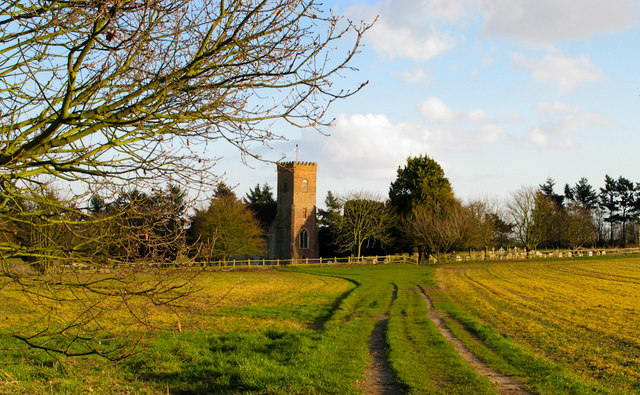
- St Peter's Church, Carlton

- Location within Suffolk
- Civil parish: Kelsale cum Carlton
- District: East Suffolk
- Shire county: Suffolk
- Region: East
- Country: England
- Sovereign state: United Kingdom

Carlton is a village and former civil parish, now in the parish of Kelsale cum Carlton, in the East Suffolk district, in the county of Suffolk, England. It is located one mile north of Saxmundham. The village is bordered by Kelsale in the north, the B1121 in the east and the A12 to the west. In 1881 the civil parish had a population of 94. On 25 March 1885 the parish was abolished and merged with Kelsale.

Carlton is the location for all the larger businesses based at the Carlton Park Industrial Estate. Adjoining this is the Carlton Park Sports ground which is owned by Saxmundham Sports Club, also the location of the Carlton Park Caravan Site. Also on the Carlton Park is Carlton Hall former home of Richard Garrett III who is buried there in the churchyard. The Church of St Peter has a brick tower set amongst arable land in the grounds of Carlton Park.

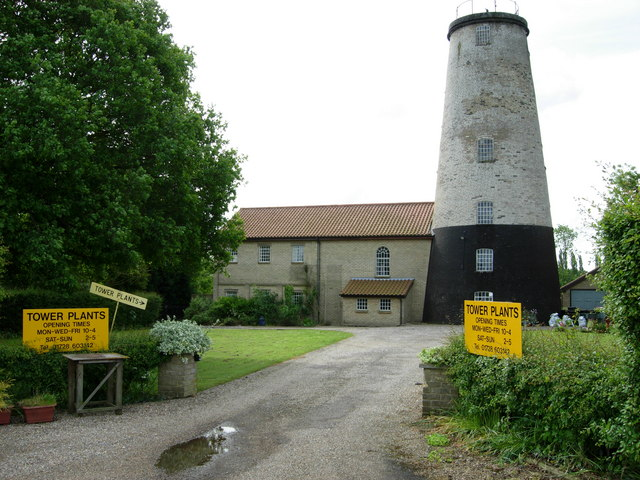
Skoulding's Mill

Carlton also has a Church of England Voluntary Controlled Primary (CEVCP) School. Prominent on the skyline is Skoulding's Mill, a tower windmill which has been converted to residential accommodation.
