= John Shipp =

John Shipp may refer to:

- John Shipp (British Army officer) (1785–1834), British army soldier
- John Shipp (vet) (fl. 1796), British army veterinary surgeon
- John Wesley Shipp, American actor
