= Kelsale cum Carlton =

Civil parish in Suffolk, England

Coordinates: 52.229°N 1.492°E

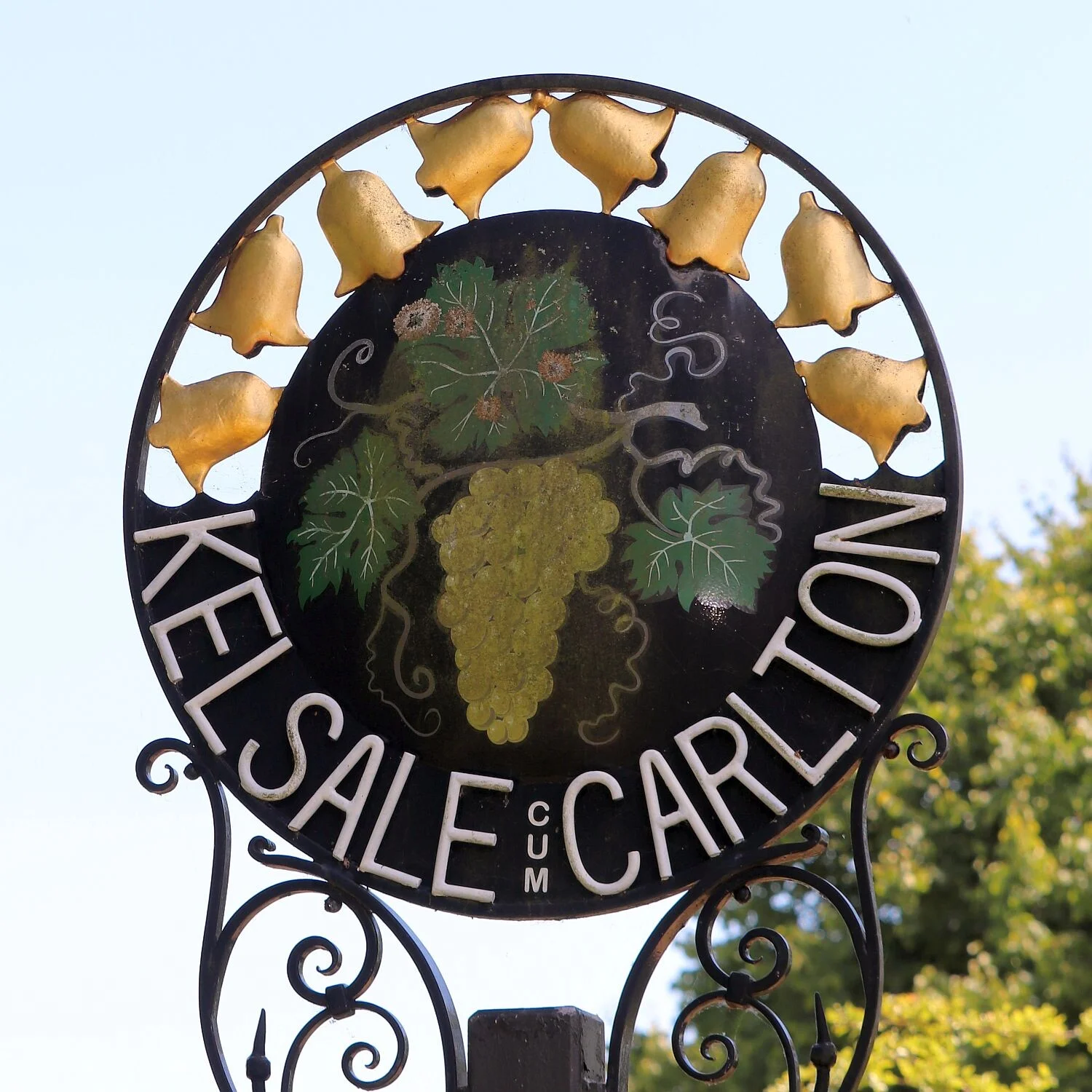
Kelsale cum Carlton village sign

Lych gate (1890) of St Mary and St Peter's Church, Kelsale; by Edward Schroeder Prior

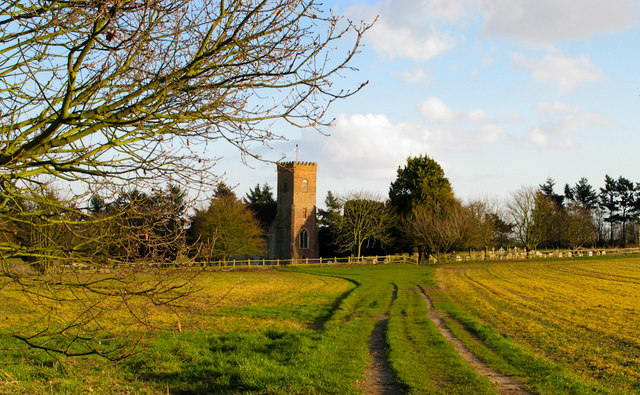
St Peter's church, Carlton

Kelsale cum Carlton is a civil parish in the English county of Suffolk. Situated to the north of Saxmundham, Kelsale cum Carlton is one of the largest parishes in Suffolk by area and includes, in addition to Kelsale and Carlton, villages and hamlets such as Dorley's Corner, Curlew Green, East Green and North Green within its boundaries. The population of the civil parish at the 2011 Census was 990. It forms an exclave of the Hoxne Hundred. The parish was formed in 1885.
