= Rendham =

Village in Suffolk, England

Coordinates: 52.229°N 1.437°E

- Entering Rendham from the south on the B1119

- Location within Suffolk
- Population: 216 (2011 Census)
- OS grid reference: TM350645
- Civil parish: Rendham
- District: East Suffolk
- Shire county: Suffolk
- Region: East
- Country: England
- Sovereign state: United Kingdom
- Post town: Saxmundham
- Postcode district: IP17
- Dialling code: 01728
- Police: Suffolk
- Fire: Suffolk
- Ambulance: East of England
- UK Parliament: Central Suffolk and North Ipswich

Rendham is a village and civil parish on the B1119 road, in the East Suffolk district, in the English county of Suffolk. It is near the town Saxmundham and the village Sweffling.

== Etymology ==
Rendham comes from Old English and Saxon. Rend is the Old English "rymed" meaning cleared. "Ham" is Saxon, meaning village. Rendham therefore means cleared village, taken from that the village being placed in a clearing by the River Alde, surrounded by woodland.

== Geography ==
Rendham lies on the River Alde, near its confluence with The Gull which diverts to Sweffling downstream from Rendham. The surrounding area is rural, farmland dotted with small areas of woodland. Rendham has two village greens called Rendham Green and The Knoll which are owned by the local Parish.

Between 1870 and 1872, Rendham's location was described in John Marius Wilson's Imperial Gazetteer of England and Wales:

The village stands on an affluent of the river Alde, 3 miles N W by W of Saxmundham r.station; and has a post-office under Saxmundham.

Rendham has a healthy populace, the majority of the population (175 people) in 2011 having very good health or good health. Only 41 people had fair, bad or very bad health. Most people in Rendham have at least one qualification with only 32 people in 2011 not having one and 77 people having a level four qualification or above. Most of Rendham in 2001 was aged between 30 and 59 (116 people) with only a small proportion of younger people (only 60 people aged between zero and 19) compared to 20-year-olds and over making 202 of the population with 116 of those people as stated before being between 30 and 59. 61% of the population in 2011 was Christian (132 people).

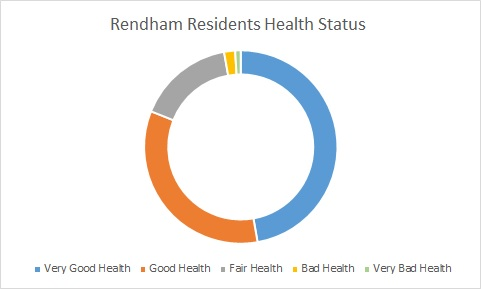
Health status of the residents of Rendham in 2011. Retrieved from Neighborhood Statistics.

Rendham has traditionally been a farming village with the majority of males in the past being employed in agriculture. In the 18th century, nearly all villagers were involved in agriculture in some way as farm workers, farmers or horticulturalists. By 1881, 46 males were involved in agriculture, more than all the other occupational orders combined at the time. Agriculture was key in the village due to its relative isolation from market towns such as Saxmundham meaning independent sources of food were needed. Occupational orders of females in 1881 is mainly unknown, however 19 were in domestic service or offices.

Most people in Rendham were employed in professional occupations in 2011 (24). Associate Professional and Technical Occupations employed the next largest number of residents at 20. Managers, directors and senior officials make up 17 of Rendhams population. This is a change from 1881 where the majority of residents were employed under agriculture to support the food production of the village (46 males of the villages 367 population). This change could be down to two things. The first being population decline from 1881 (367 people) to 2011 (216 people) meaning not as many crops were needed and males moved from agriculture to other employment. The second is more likely and is due to the changing economy from 1881 to 2011. Between the years, the United Kingdom has gone from a primary sector based economy where industry revolves around farming and fishing, into one dominated by the tertiary sector based on services. People moved away from primary agriculture occupations (the largest employer in 1881) into tertiary based jobs (the largest employer in 2011).

Nearly all of the housing in Rendham in 2011 was detached (76 houses) or semi detached (24 houses). The number of detached houses (which are usually more expensive than other houses) shows the village is affluent and as stated previously is populated by people with professional occupations and high income. This affluence is demonstrated further by most houses having three bedrooms or more (89 houses), the majority having three bedrooms (51 houses) and only 12 houses having one or two bedrooms (in 2011). 130 people or 69.9% of the population in 2011 were living as a couple (married or civil partnership) showing the spare rooms were probably used for visitors and not children as the number of children is low (60 people 19 or below).

== History ==
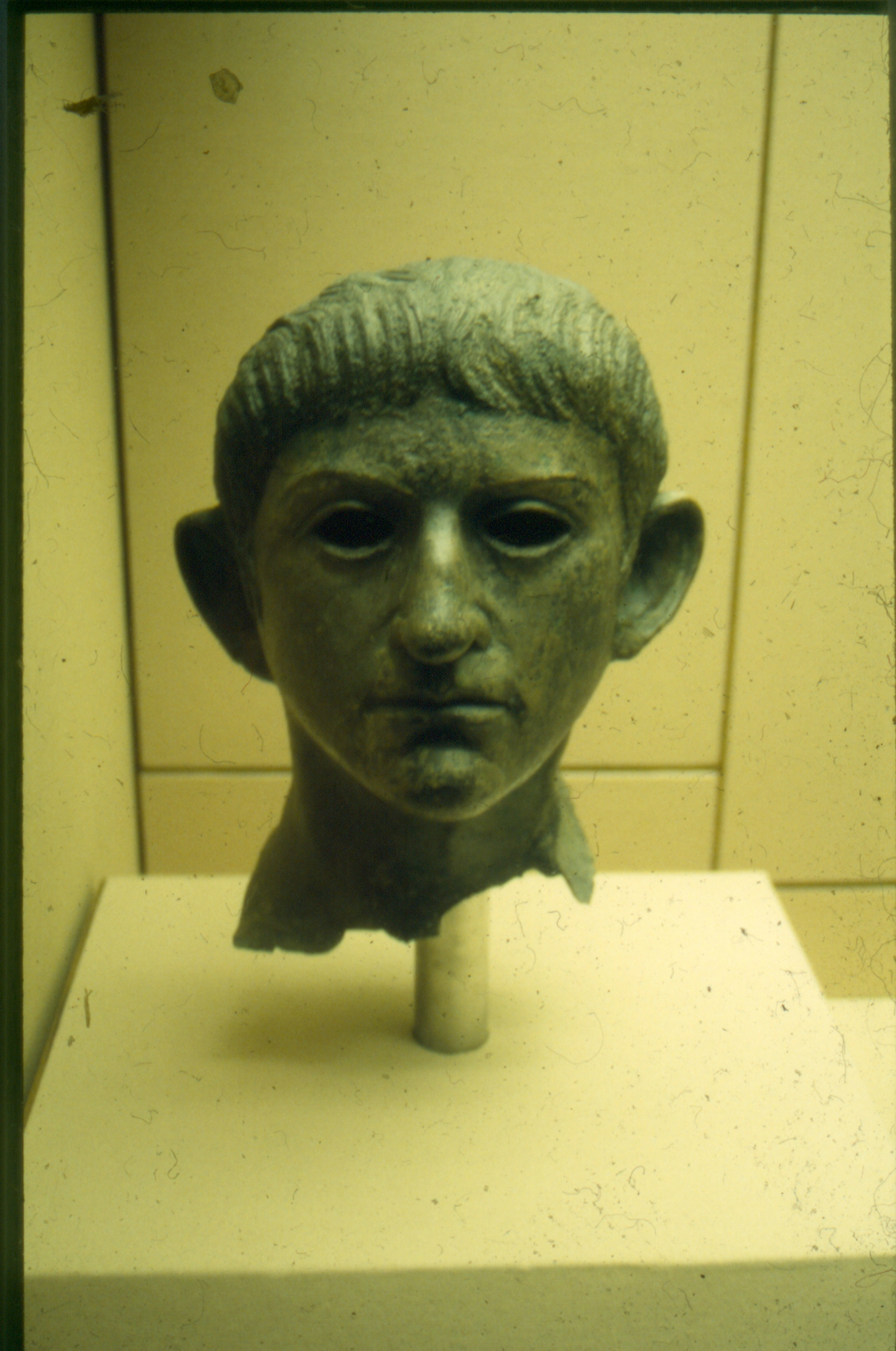
Bronze head of the Emperor Claudius, found in the River Alde. British Museum, cat.no. PRB 1965.12-1.1

The first inhabitants of Rendham were believed to have settled in the 1st century, due to the river providing food (fish and river birds), fertile soils from flooding and transport by boat. In AD60 Queen Boudicca ruled the area of Suffolk as leader of the Iceni, 20 years into the Roman invasion of Britain. There is evidence that residents of Rendham joined her army and were present at the storming of the Temple of Claudius in Colchester. In 1907 two Rendham schoolboys (Arthur Baxter and Arthur Godbold) found an object in the River Alde at Rendham. After a few years a schoolmaster from Benhall purchased the sculpture for five shillings. It was the looted head of the Emperor Claudius from a bronze statue in Colchester, plundered by the Iceni. It later sold for £15,500 in Sotheby's to the British Museum (where it is on display currently), annoying residents of Rendham as they were not mentioned. A replica head is in the history corner of St Michael's church. Following the restoration of the monarchy in 1660, Rendham became popular amongst non-conformists. A congregation chapel was formed in 1680 and by 1740 its popularity meant people attended from as far out as Debenham and a new chapel was built. This was finished in 1750 and had a donation from famous hymn writer Dr. Isaac Watts. Rendham Chapel was later attended by painter Henry Bright. Rendham Chapel became the United Reform Church and closed in 1977.

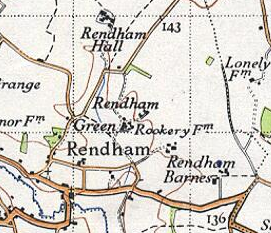
Rendham shown on an Ordnance Survey map of 20th-century Great Britain

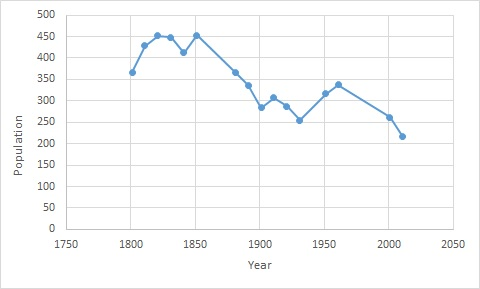
Graph showing the population change of Rendham between 1801 and 2011

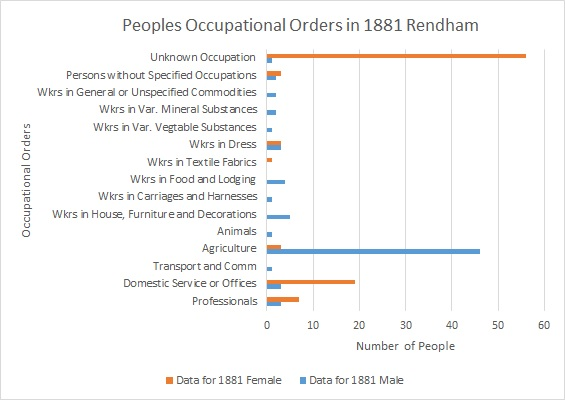
Peoples Occupational Orders in Rendham in 1881

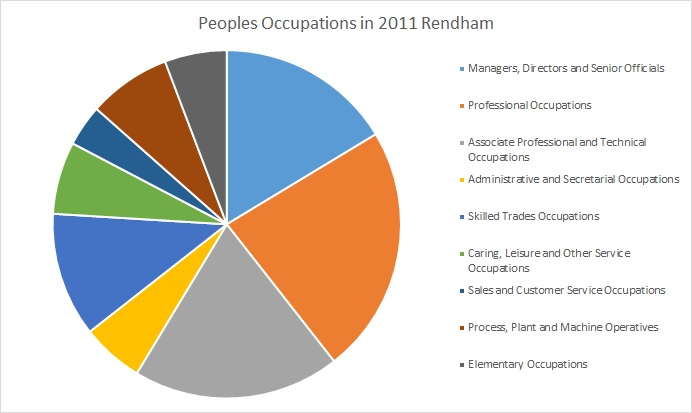
Peoples Occupations in Rendham in 2011
