= St Peter and St Paul's Church, Aldeburgh =

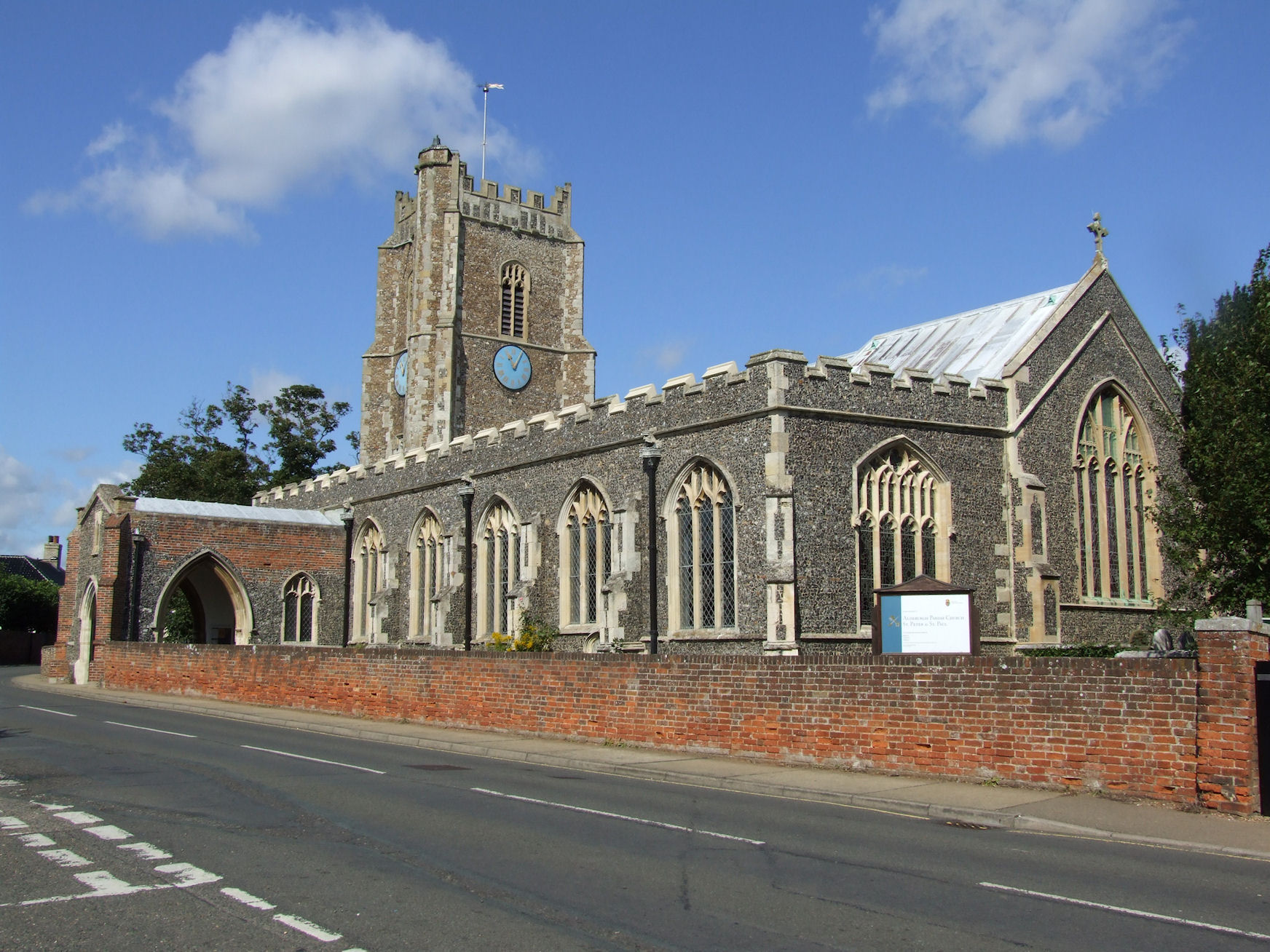
- St Peter and St Paul's Church, Aldeburgh
- St Peter and St Paul's Church, Aldeburgh
- 52°09′18″N 1°36′00″E
- Location: Aldeburgh
- Country: England
- Denomination: Church of England

History
- Dedication: St Peter and St Paul

Architecture
- Heritage designation: Grade II* listed

Administration
- Province: Province of Canterbury
- Diocese: Diocese of St Edmundsbury and Ipswich
- Archdeaconry: Archdeaconry of Suffolk
- Deanery: Saxmundham
- Parish: Aldeburgh with Hazlewood

St Peter and St Paul's Church is a Church of England parish church in the town of Aldeburgh in Suffolk, England. It is dedicated to the apostles Peter and Paul. It has been a Grade II* listed building since 1950.

Buried in the churchyard are the composer Benjamin Britten and the physician and suffragist Elizabeth Garrett Anderson.

== History and architecture ==
Of probable Saxon foundation, a church was recorded at Aldeburgh in the Domesday Book. The oldest extant fabric is probably the 14th-century three-stage tower with polygonal stair turret. The remainder of the building is the result of a major Perpendicular Gothic rebuilding during the first half of the 16th century, which spanned the years of the English reformation.

The nave, north aisle and north chapel were rebuilt between 1525–1529, followed by the south aisle and south chapel in 1534–1535, the south porch in 1539, and the chancel in 1545. The west gallery was added by Robert Appleton in 1840. Restorations were undertaken in 1870–1871 by Henry Perkin and again in 1891 by Edward Bishop.

Much of the building is in typical East Anglian flint flushwork with ashlar dressings. The unusual south porch adjoins the pavement and has arches opening to the east and west to allow processions to pass through the precinct.

The stained glass in the east chancel window, depicting the Crucifixion, was installed in 1891 and has been attributed to Hardman & Co. The Lady Chapel contains a 1929 window of St Anne teaching the Infant Mary to read, designed by Archibald Keightley Nicholson. The 1980 Benjamin Britten memorial window was designed by John Piper and manufactured by Patrick Reyntiens. Across three lights the window depicts representations of Britten's Parables for Church Performance written between 1964 and 1968 - The Prodigal Son, Curlew River, and The Burning Fiery Furnace. Piper had been a longtime collaborator of Britten, designing many stage sets for his operatic productions.

== Fittings ==
The baptismal font, dating from about 1320, is the oldest surviving fitting. Several of its carved panels of angels and lions were defaced in 1643 during the Puritan iconoclasm of William Dowsing. A number of carved 15th-century Suffolk-style poppyhead bench ends also survive.

The octagonal wineglass pulpit, made in 1632 by John Garrard, is carved with fish and vine motifs in high relief and stands on a tapering pedestal.

The church contains several interesting monuments. In the south chapel stands a neoclassical memorial to Lady Henrietta Vernon, who died in 1786, comprising a sarcophagus with a female figure and angel above. The north aisle contains a bust memorial to the poet and former curate George Crabbe, by Thomas Thurlow (1847). A part-gilded marble relief of a dying soldier by Gilbert Bayes was first exhibited at the Royal Academy of Arts in 1917 before being installed as the town’s war memorial.

The church has a two manual pipe organ by J. W. Walker & Sons Ltd dating from 1884. A specification of the organ can be found on the National Pipe Organ Register.

== Burials ==
The churchyard contains a large sculpted marble memorial to the seven RNLI lifeboatmen - John Butcher, Charles Crisp, Thomas Morris, Walter George Ward, Allan Arthur Easter, Herbert William Downing, and James Miller Ward - who perished in the Aldeburgh lifeboat disaster on 7 December 1899, when their boat capsized in heavy seas while attempting a rescue. All seven men are buried in a single plot with their own individual cross-shaped marker stone facing the main memorial and looking out to sea. There is also a copper memorial tablet to the men inside the church.

Buried in her family plot is Elizabeth Garrett Anderson, who in 1865 became the first woman to qualify as a physician and surgeon in England. A longstanding supporter of women’s suffrage, Anderson’s election as Mayor of Aldeburgh in 1908 marked the first time in England a woman would be elected to such a role.

The composer, conductor and pianist Benjamin Britten, who lived in Aldeburgh for twenty years, is buried in the churchyard alongside his partner, the tenor Peter Pears. The soprano Joan Cross and the composer and conductor Imogen Holst are also interred here.

== Bells ==
The church has a ring of eight bells, with all but the sixth bell being cast by John Taylor & Co at their Loughborough foundry in 1960 and 1961 as part of the restoration and augmentation of the ring. The restored bells were rededicated on 18 June 1961. Previously there were six bells, which were rehung by George Day of Eye in 1885, with fourth bell recast and treble added by John Warner & Sons to make six. The bells hang in an iroko wooden frame installed at the same time as the bells were overhauled in the 1960s.

Peals lasting around three hours are rung on the bells most months by members of the Suffolk Guild of Ringers. In 2008 a complaint was lodged with Suffolk Coastal district council by a neighbour. The complaint was not upheld and dismissed during a debate in the House of Commons.

Bells of St Peter and St Paul's, Aldeburgh
Bell	Date	Note	Diameter	Founder	Weight		
Bell	Date	Note	Diameter	Founder	long measure	lb	kg
Treble	1961	Ab	23.50 in (59.7 cm)	John Taylor & Co	3 long cwt 0 qr 20 lb	356	161
2nd	1961	G	24.50 in (62.2 cm)	John Taylor & Co	3 long cwt 1 qr 25 lb	389	176
3rd	1960	F	26.00 in (66.0 cm)	John Taylor & Co	3 long cwt 3 qr 21 lb	441	200
4th	1960	Eb	27.50 in (69.9 cm)	John Taylor & Co	4 long cwt 2 qr 2 lb	506	230
5th	1622	Db	28.50 in (72.4 cm)	William & John II Brend	4 long cwt 1 qr 7 lb	483	219
6th	1913	C	31.13 in (79.1 cm)	John Taylor & Co	6 long cwt 0 qr 4 lb	676	307
7th	1913	Bb	35.00 in (88.9 cm)	John Taylor & Co	8 long cwt 2 qr 1 lb	953	432
Tenor	1960	Ab	39.13 in (99.4 cm)	John Taylor & Co	11 long cwt 2 qr 20 lb	1,308	593

== Gallery ==
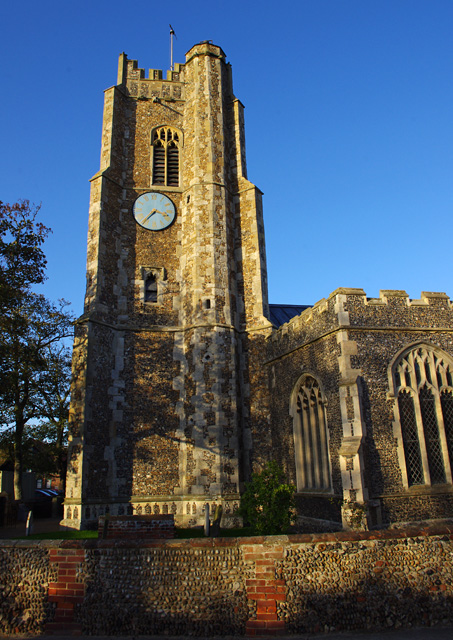
View of west tower and stair turret

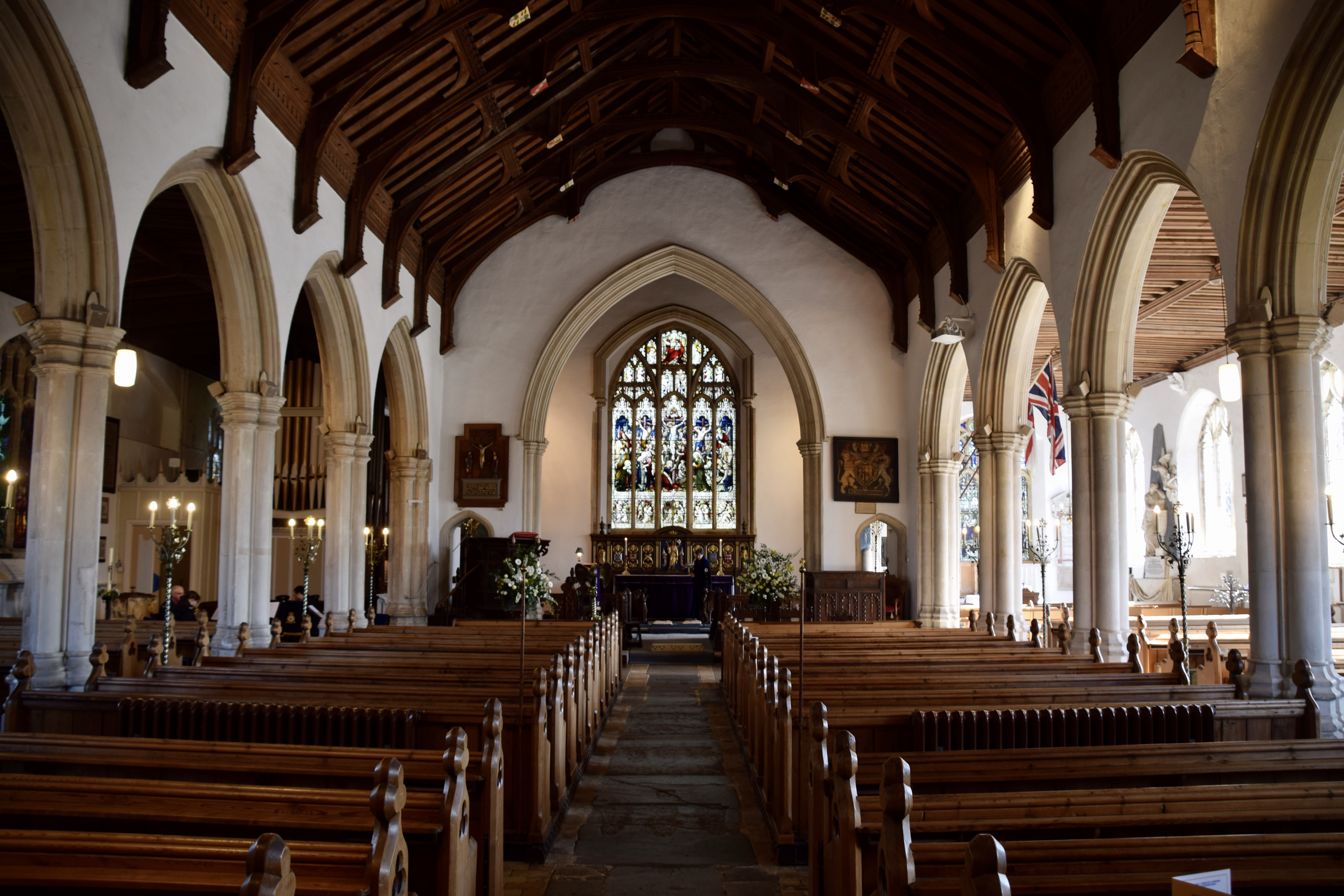
Interior view of nave and chancel

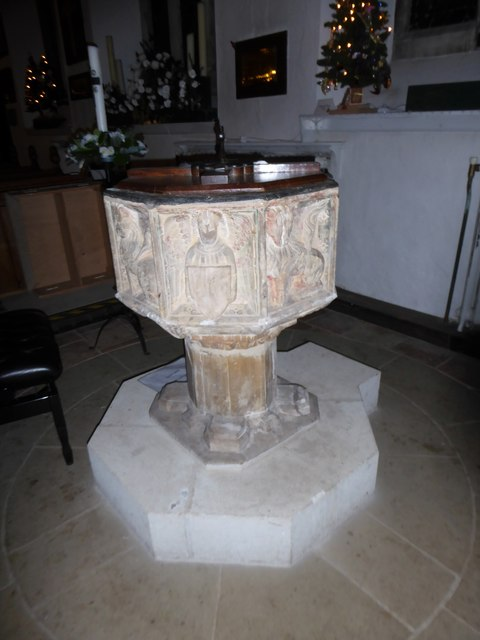
14th century baptismal font

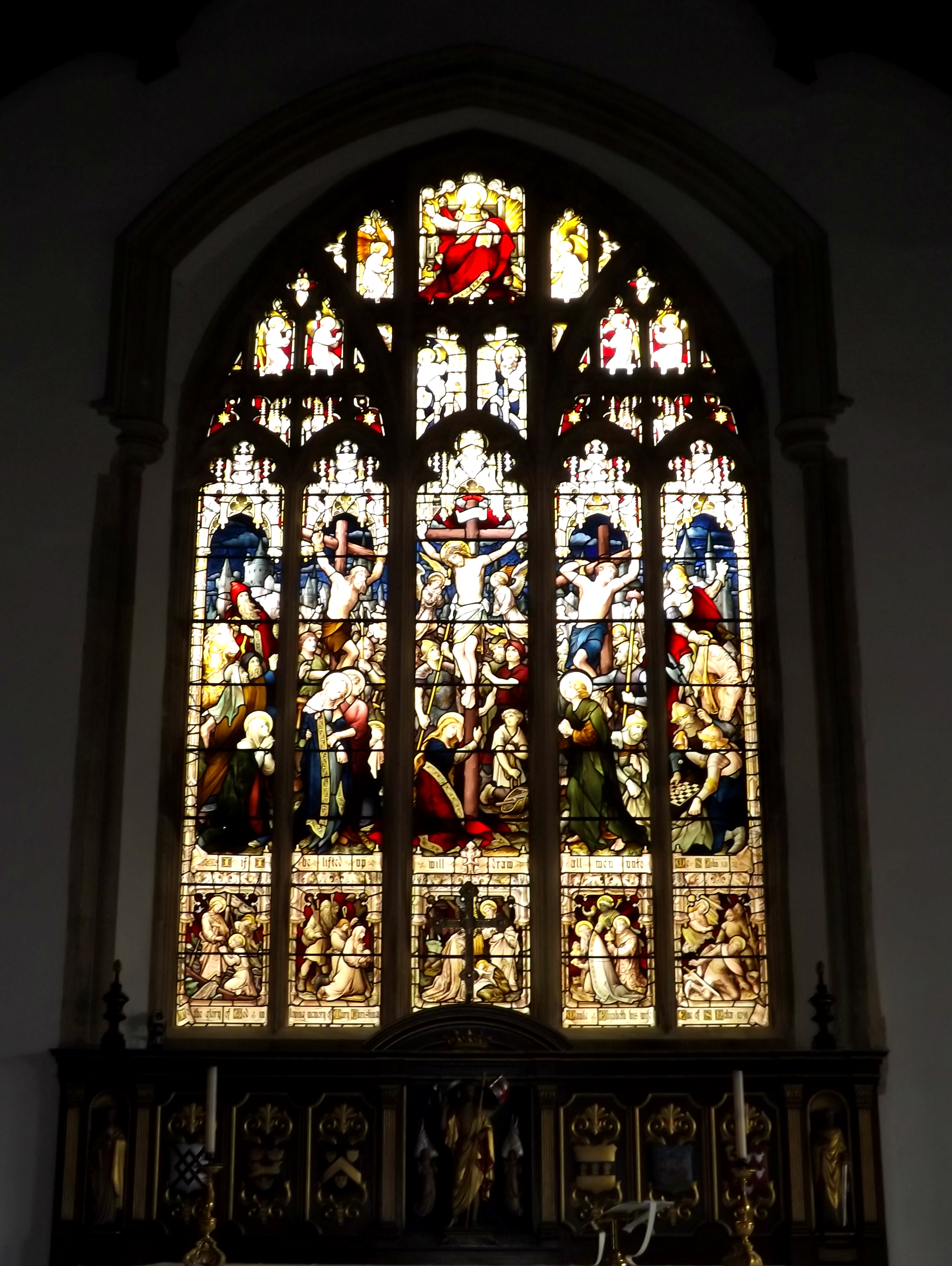
East chancel window by Hardman & Co.

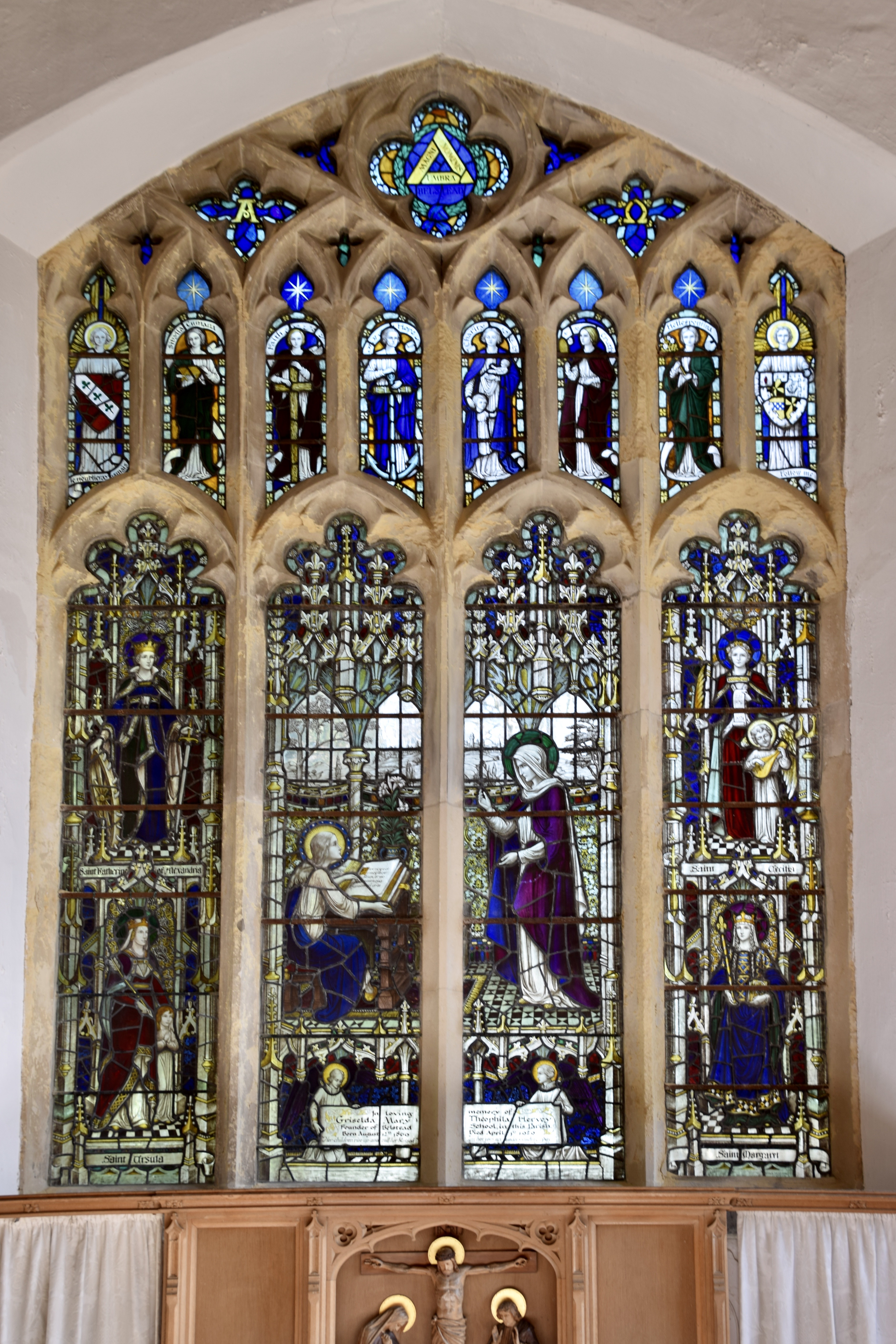
Window by Archibald Keightley Nicholson

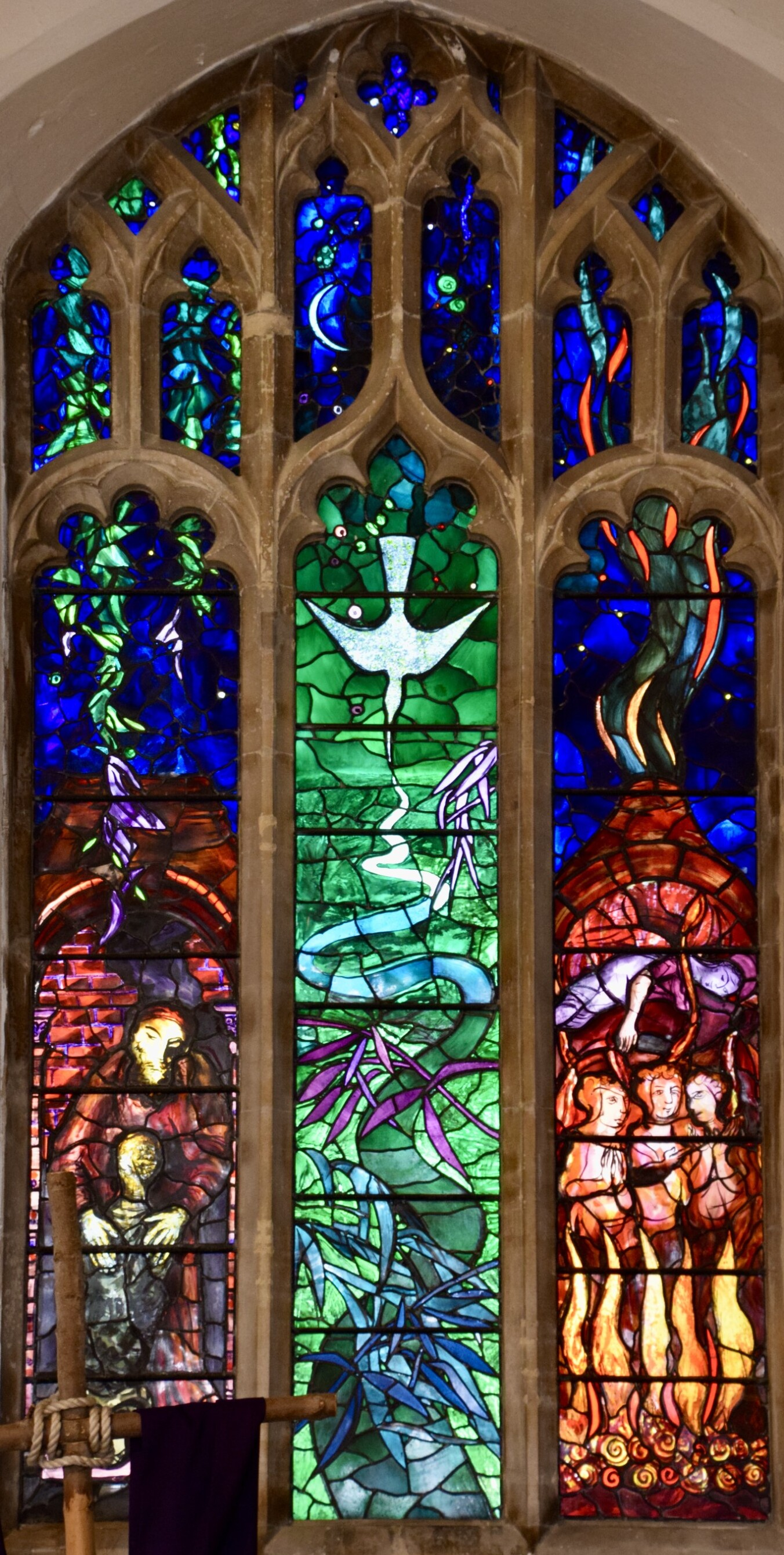
Memorial window to Benjamin Britten by John Piper

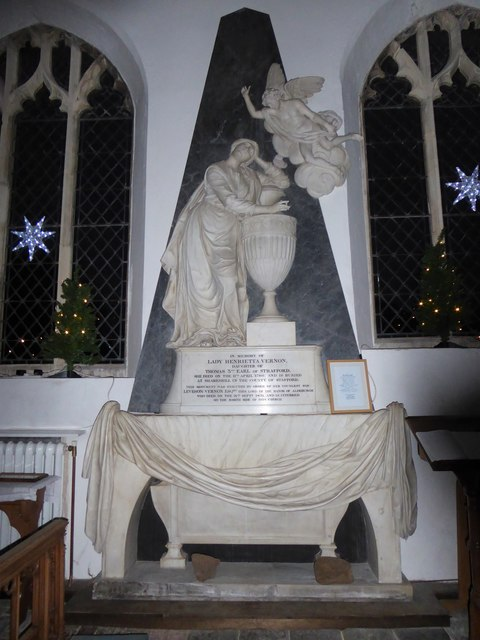
Memorial to Lady Henrietta Vernon

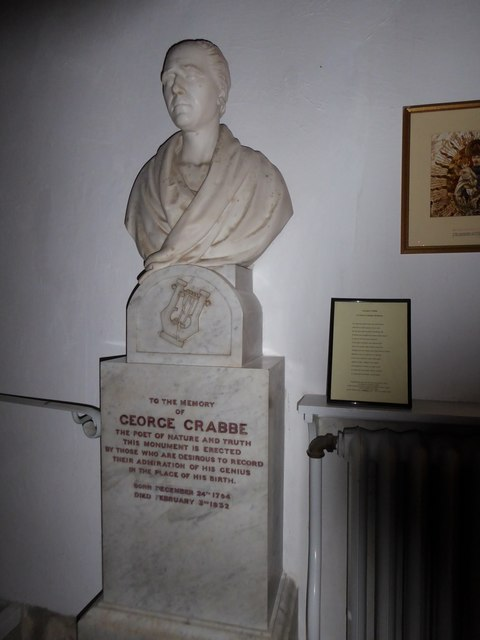
Memorial to George Crabbe by Thomas Thurlow

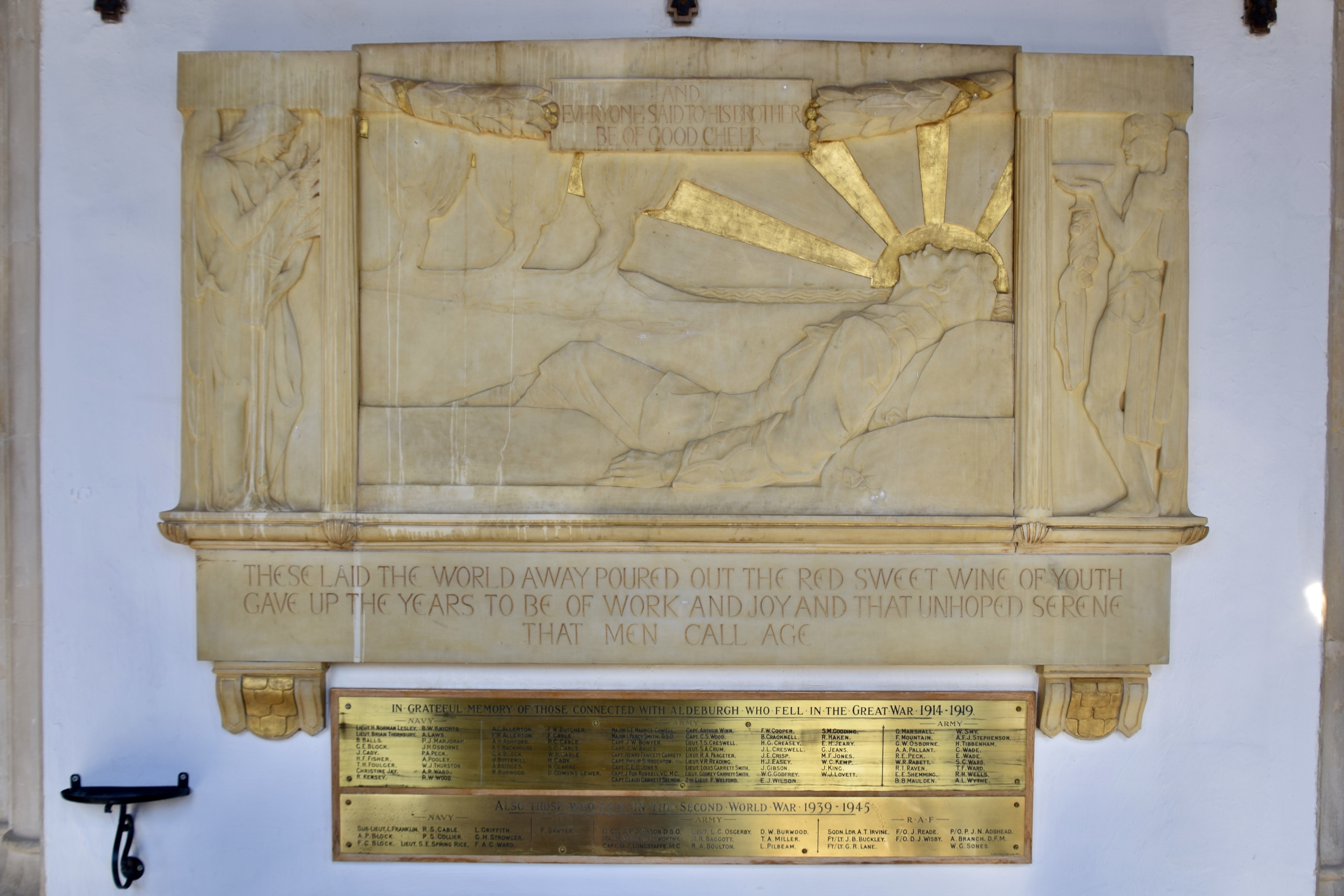
War memorial by Gilbert Bayes

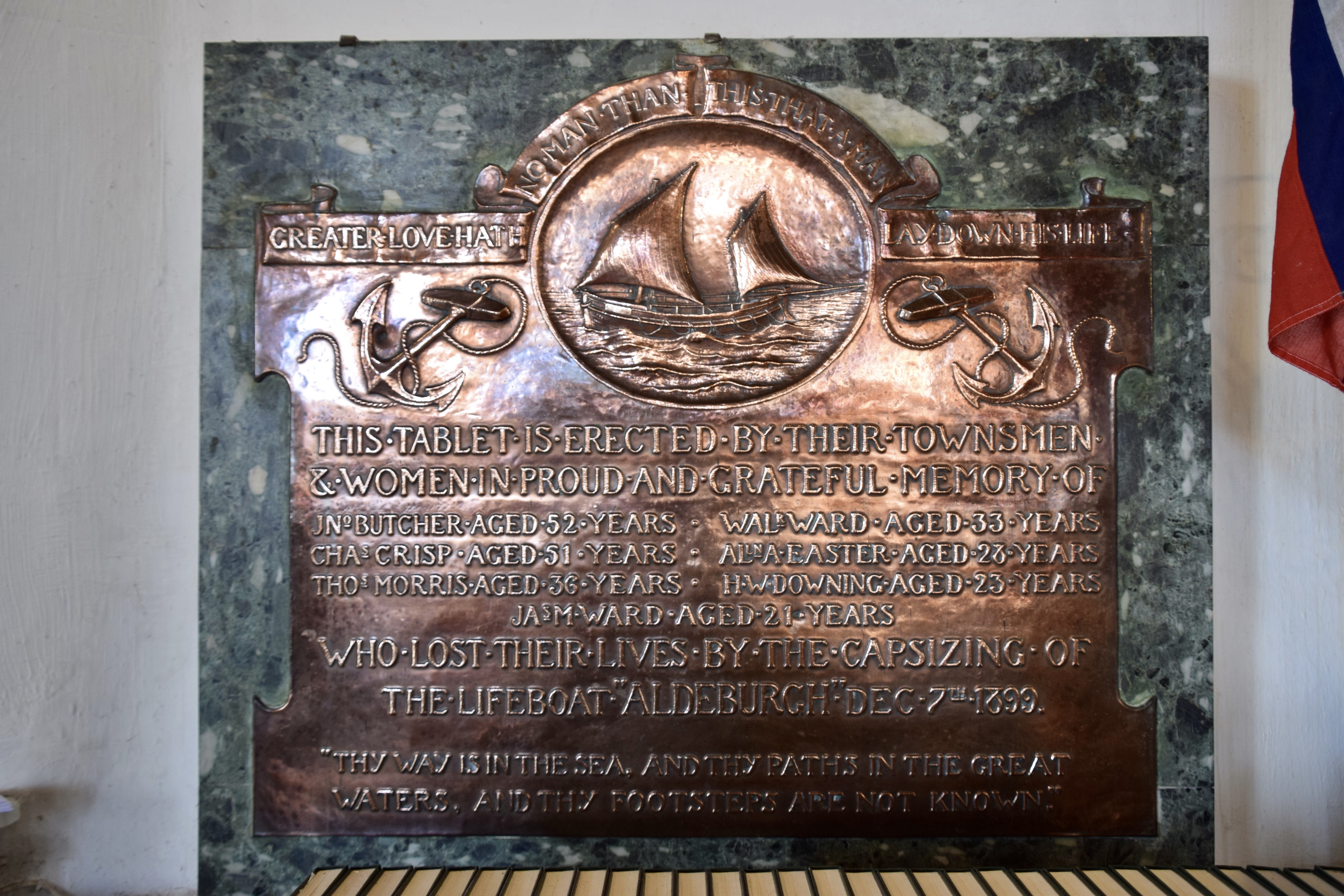
Memorial plaque commemorating the 1899 Aldeburgh lifeboat disaster

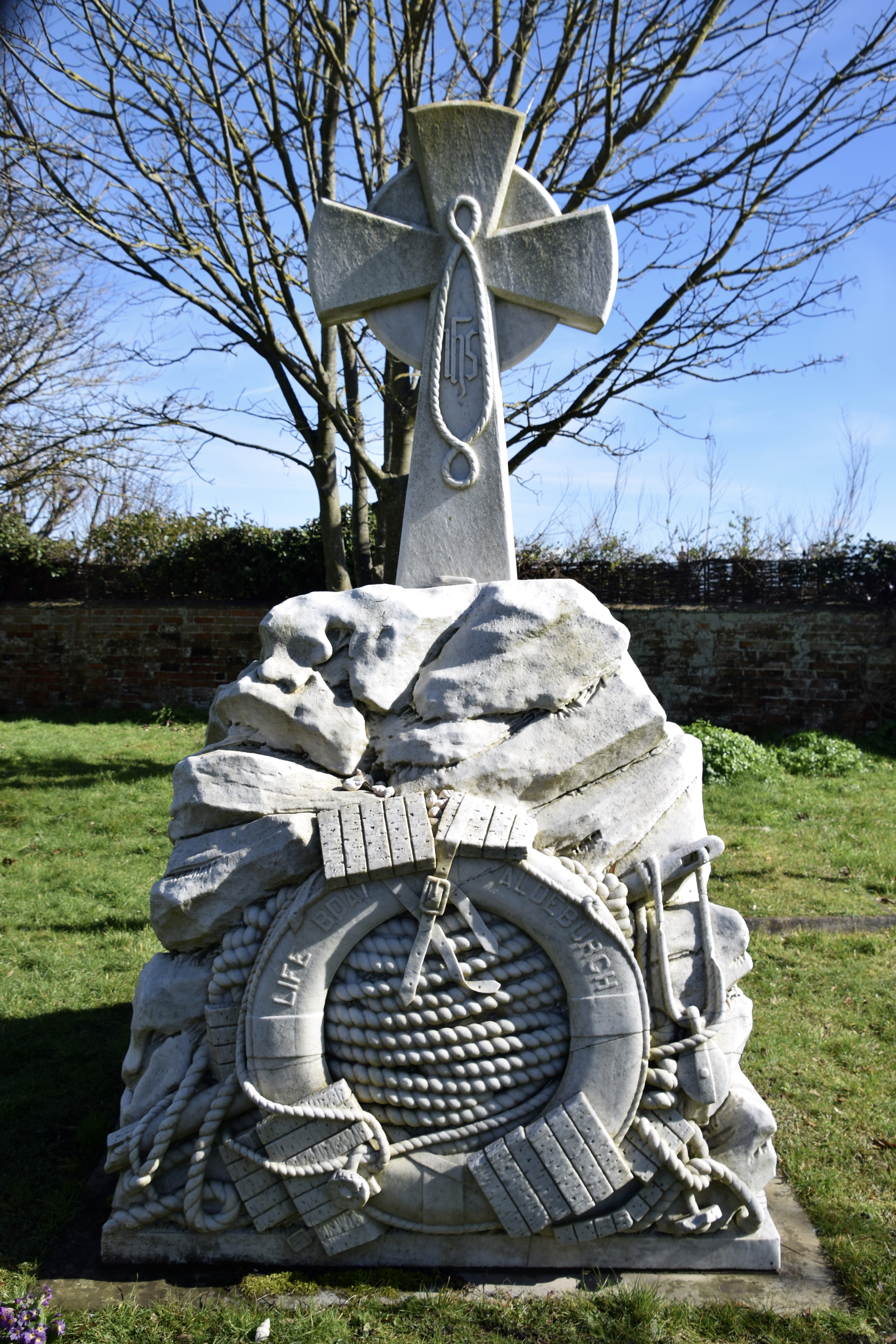
Churchyard memorial commemorating the 1899 Aldeburgh lifeboat disaster (front)

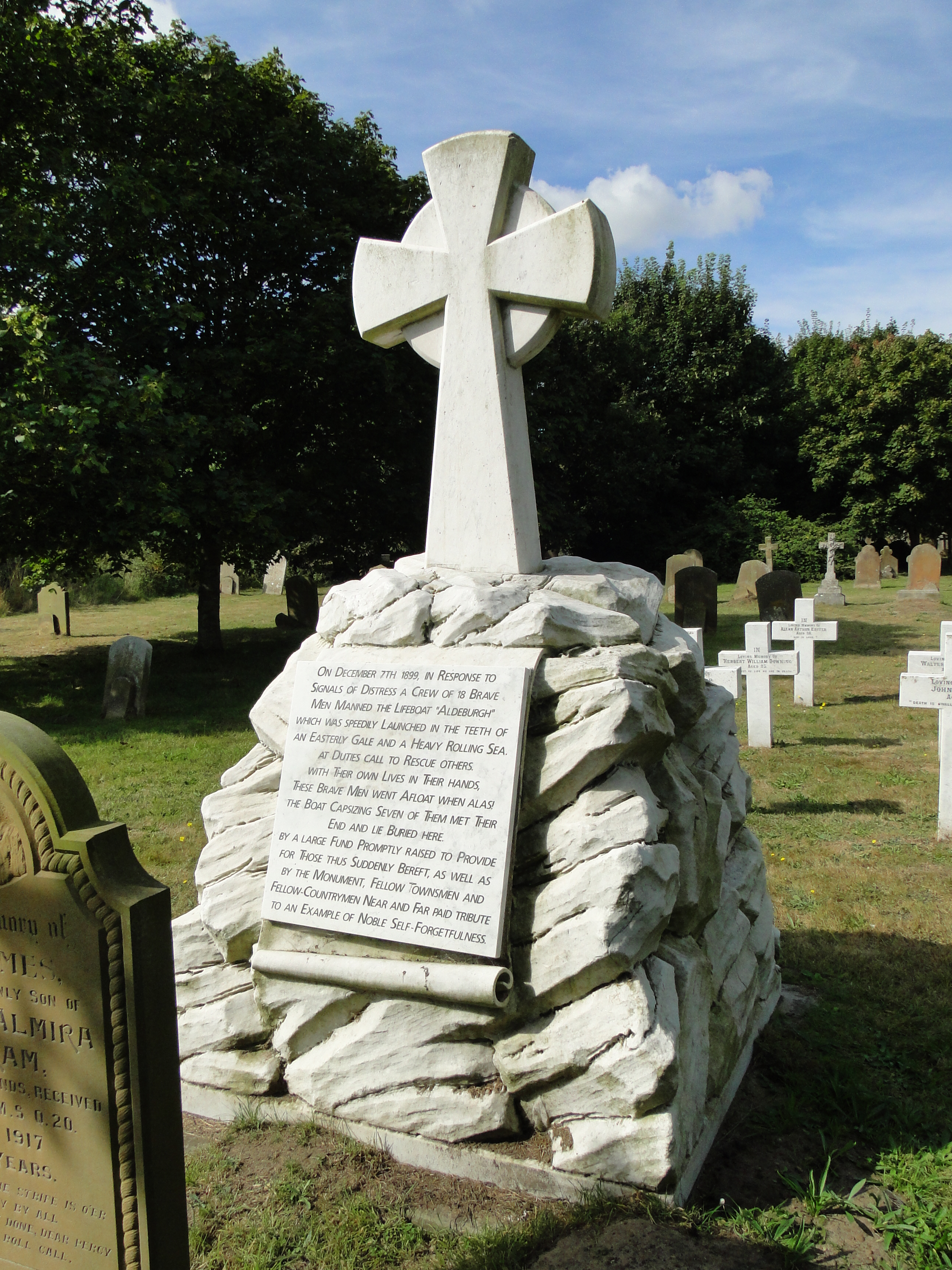
Churchyard memorial commemorating the 1899 Aldeburgh lifeboat disaster (rear)

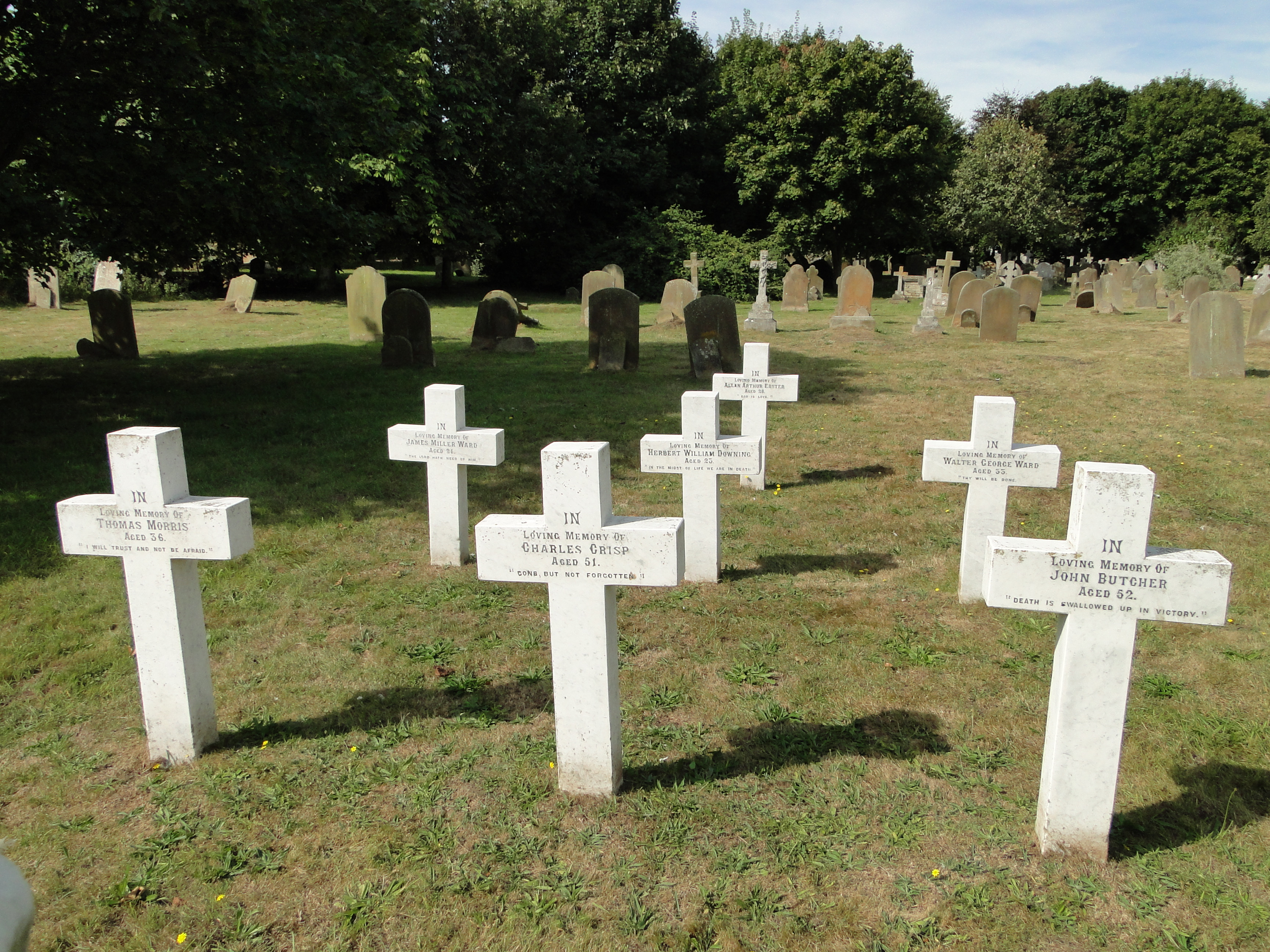
Gravestones of the seven lifeboatmen killed in the 1899 Aldeburgh lifeboat disaster

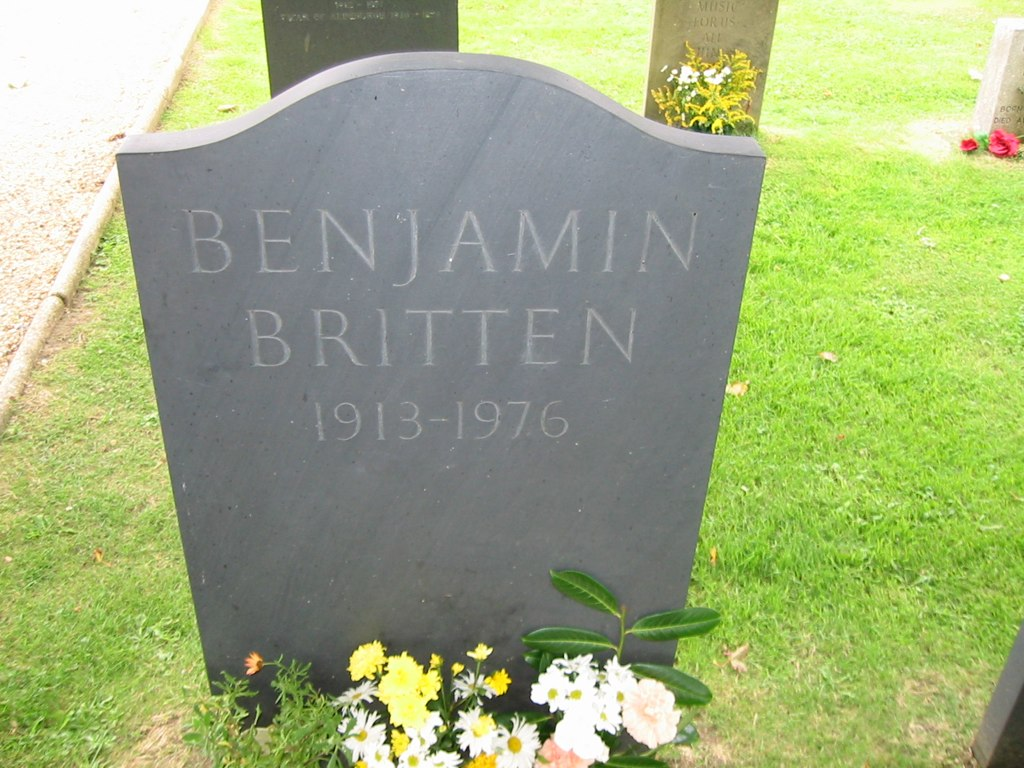
Gravestone of Benjamin Britten

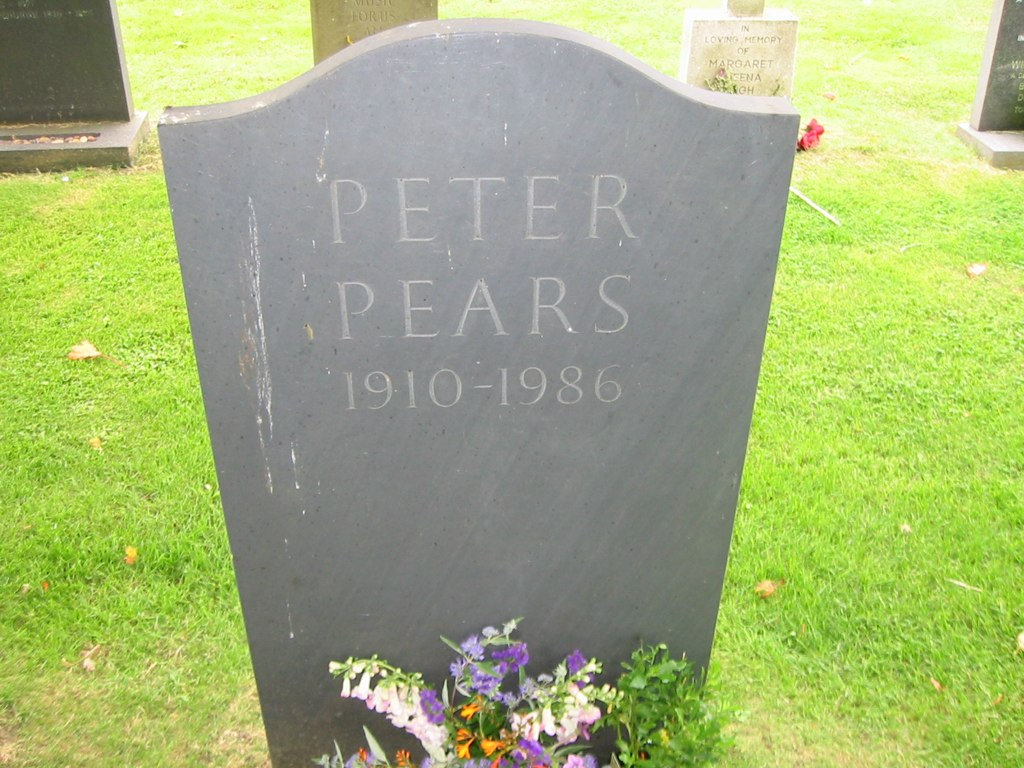
Grave of Sir Peter Pears

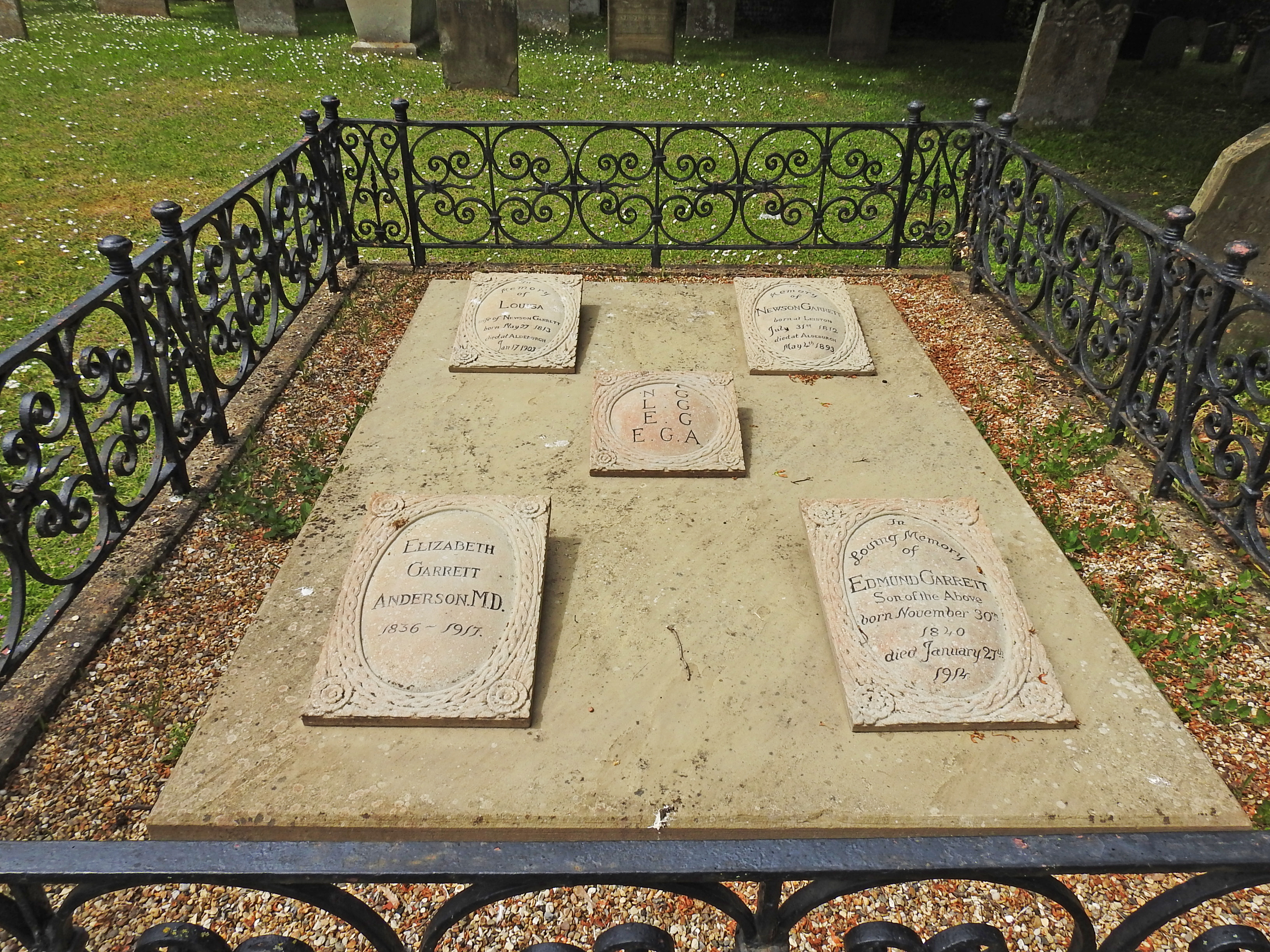
Grave of Elizabeth Garrett Anderson
