= Sweffling =

Village in Suffolk, England

Coordinates: 52.223°N 1.435°E

- Sweffling village and village sign

- Location within Suffolk
- Population: 187 (2011)
- Civil parish: Swefling
- District: East Suffolk
- Shire county: Suffolk
- Region: East
- Country: England
- Sovereign state: United Kingdom
- Post town: Saxmundham
- Postcode district: IP17
- Police: Suffolk
- Fire: Suffolk
- Ambulance: East of England
- UK Parliament: Central Suffolk and North Ipswich

Sweffling or Swefling is a village and civil parish in the East Suffolk district, in the county of Suffolk, England. Nearby settlements include the town of Saxmundham and the village of Rendham. In 2011 the parish had a population of 187. From 1974 to 2019 it was in Suffolk Coastal district.

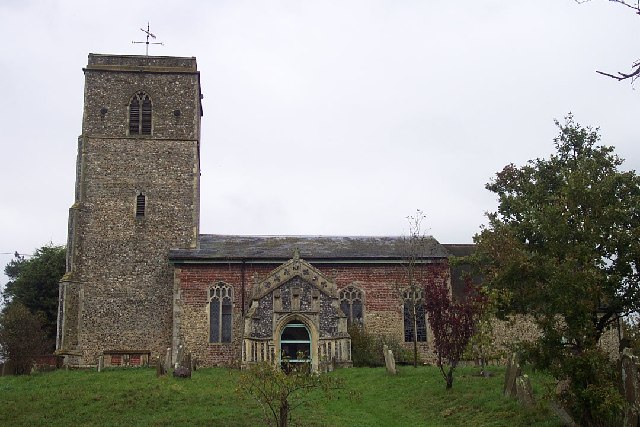
St Mary the Virgin church, Sweffling

The medieval church of St Mary the Virgin, restored in 1832, is a grade II* listed building.
