= Thomas Thurlow (sculptor) =

English sculptor

Thomas Thurlow (1813 – 1899) was a renowned English sculptor who created memorials in churches in the Saxmundham, Suffolk area, including a bust of the poet George Crabbe in St Peter and St Paul's Church, Aldeburgh. His father, John Thurlow (b. c1784), was a builder and stonemason who built 'The White House' (now Holly Lodge) in the High Street. Both are buried along with other members of the Thurlow family in the churchyard of the parish church.

== Life ==
Thomas Thurlow was born in North Entrance in Saxmundham and went to a school in Brook Cottage; Henry Bright (painter) went to the same school, and in Thurlow's memoirs he also claims Newson Garrett (who later built Snape Maltings) as a school friend. As a teenager he would turn his hand to anything such as wood and plaster carving, polishing stones, and he even made a violin, succeeding at the second attempt. At the age of 23 he left home for London where he was engaged by a monument manufacturer in Regent Street. During his spare time he took lessons in oil painting, something he pursued throughout his life (some of his paintings are in the Moot Hall, Aldeburgh). After a time employed with the London Marble Works, where he gained experience of stone carving, Thurlow returned to Suffolk first opening a business in Halesworth and then settling back in Saxmundham in 1839.

During his life, Thurlow completed many works for local people and various churches, including a memorial to Sir C. Blois from Cockfield Hall in Yoxford Church, a life-size statue of Samuel Clouting in Kelsale Church, a marble bust of Richard Garrett III in Leiston Church, and a commission from William Long of Hurts Hall to carve a rose and spray for the entrance to his mansion. As well as paid works, he exhibited widely including at the Royal Academy and the Ipswich Fine Art Club.

He was active in the town being appointed the Secretary and manager of the Saxmundham Gas Works (which was in Gas Hill now New Cut), he was an Overseer for the Parish making and collecting the Rates, he was the town Surveyor supervising the building of Gurneys bank in Market Place amongst others, and in 1847 he acquired the Licence for Photography for the County of Suffolk which he practised for a time. He is reported to have given penny readings in the Market Hall, reciting from Dickens to packed audiences.
