= Bernard Collins =

English cricketer

Personal information
- Full name: Bernard Abdy Collins
- Born: 17 February 1880; Saxmundham, Suffolk, England
- Died: 22 October 1951 (aged 71); Bedford, Bedfordshire, England
- Batting: Right-handed

Domestic team information
- Years: Team
- 1901: Oxford University
- 1904: Suffolk

Career statistics
| Competition | First-class |
|---|---|
| Matches | 1 |
| Runs scored | 83 |
| Batting average | 83.00 |
| 100s/50s | –/1 |
| Top score | 83* |
| Catches/stumpings | 1/– |
- Source: Cricinfo, 12 July 2019

Bernard Abdy Collins CIE (17 February 1880 – 22 October 1951) was a British administrator in India and English first-class cricketer.

Collins was born at Saxmundham in February 1880 to Henry Abdy Collins and his wife, Florence Ellen Cartwright. He was educated at Malvern College, before going up to Brasenose College, Oxford. While studying at Oxford, he made a single appearance in first-class cricket for Oxford University against the Marylebone Cricket Club at Oxford in 1901. Collins batted twice in the match at number eleven. He was dismissed in the Oxford first-innings and was dismissed without scoring by John Rawlin. In their second-innings he top-scored with an unbeaten 83, sharing in a last wicket partnership of 149 with Frank Hollins. In addition to playing first-class cricket, Collins also played minor counties cricket for Suffolk in 1904, making five appearances in the Minor Counties Championship. He was also the editor of 'Psychic Science' and the author of the book 'Death is Not the End' (Psychic Press, London 1939) in which he puts forth the case for survival after death.

Collins was admitted to the Indian Civil Service in October 1904. He served as the director-general of commerce and industry in Hyderabad State, and was later made a Companion of the Order of the Indian Empire in December 1925. He died at Bedford in October 1951.
