= Henry Manners Chichester =

British army officer (1832–1894)

- Born: 11 April 1832; London, England
- Died: 1894 (aged 61–62)
- Occupations: Lieutenant, 85th Foot Regiment, British Army; author

Henry Manners Chichester (11 April 1832 – 1894) was a British Army officer who after ten years active service overseas returned home and became an author.

== Life ==
Chichester was the son of Henry William Chichester and Isabella Manners-Sutton, the daughter of Charles Manners-Sutton.

He entered the army in 1853, and became lieutenant in the 85th regiment (the Shropshire light infantry). For ten years he served abroad with his regiment, chiefly at Mauritius and the Cape of Good Hope, and at the Cape he was employed for a time as acting engineer officer. Returning home in 1863, he retired from the army, and thenceforth devoted himself almost exclusively to the study of military history. He gave valuable assistance in compiling and editing several regimental histories. The Historical Records of the 24th foot and of the 40th foot (2nd Somersetshire regiment, now 1st battalion the Prince of Wales's volunteers)—the former published in 1892 and the latter in 1893—owe much to his labours, and at the time of his death he was beginning work on the records of his own regiment, the 80th foot. In 1890, he edited The Memoirs of the Extraordinary Military Career of John Shipp in Mr. Fisher Unwin's Adventure Series. He collaborated with George Burges-Short in preparing The Records and Badges of every Regiment and Corps in the British Army, which was published in 1895, the year following Chichester's death.

Probably Chichester's most important contributions to military history appeared in this dictionary, for which he wrote memoirs of 499 military officers or writers on military subjects. His name figured in the list of writers prefixed to each volume from the first to the forty-sixth (omitting the forty-fifth). Among the more conspicuous military names entrusted to him were Lords Cadogan and Cutts, Viscount Hardinge of Lahore, Rowland, first Viscount Hill, Lord Lynedoch, Stringer Lawrence, and Sir John Moore. He was indefatigable in his efforts to collect authentic biograpliic details. His method of work is well illustrated by his notice of Francis Jarry, a Frenchman who founded the Royal Military College now located at Sandhurst. It was already known that Jarry in earlier life had served at various times in both the Prussian and French armies, but, in order to ascertain definitely his services abroad, Chichester applied to the ministries of war at both Paris and Berlin, and induced the authorities in both places to make investigation, of which the results appeared in the Dictionary.

== Works ==
- Memoirs of the extraordinary military career of John Shipp, late a lieut. in His Majesty's 87th regiment (1890) (as editor)
- The Records and Badges of Every Regiment and Corps in the British Army (1900) with George Burges-Short
- Chichester wrote over 480 entries for the Dictionary of National Biography, 1885-1900.

== Sources ==
This article incorporates text from a publication now in the public domain: Lee, Sidney (1901). "Chichester, Henry Manners". In Lee, Sidney (ed.). Dictionary of National Biography (1st supplement). London: Smith, Elder & Co.
