= Henry Jutsum =

English painter (1816–1869)

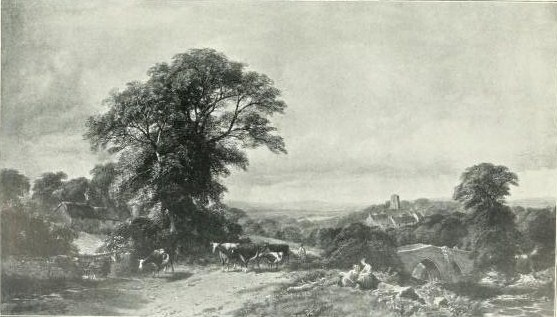
Landscape with cattle and trees (b/w plate)

Henry Jutsum (1816 – 3 March 1869), was an English landscape painter.

== Life and work ==
Jutsum was born in London and educated in Devonshire. There he acquired a taste for landscape painting, and on returning to London to further his art studies, he drew from nature, frequently in Kensington Gardens. In 1830 he became an apprentice to artist James Stark (of the Norwich School of painters).

He first exhibited at the Royal Academy in 1836 and also showed work at the British Institution. He devoted himself for some time to watercolour painting, probably because of the influence of the work of J S Cotman (an important Norwich School artist), and in 1843 was elected a member of the New Watercolour Society. He continued, however, to exhibit at the Royal Academy, and preferring painting in oil, eventually resigned his membership of the Watercolour Society.

He was a frequent contributor to the chief exhibitions up to his death, and his works were always greatly admired. "The Noonday Walk" in the Royal Collection was engraved for "The Art Journal"; "The Foot Bridge" is in the Victoria and Albert Museum. Jutsum was also an associate of painter Henry Bright.

Jutsum died at Hamilton terrace, St. John's Wood, London in March 1869, aged 53. Many of his own drawings in his possession and others collected by him were sold by auction at Christie's on 17 April 1882.

== Principal works ==
- The Foot Bridge (1865 - V & A).
- Tintem Abbey - Evening (1843).
- Rabbit Warren (1849).
- A Cottage Home in the Highlands of Scotland (1853).
- The Deer Park (1856).
