= SET Saxmundham School =

Location
- Seaman Avenue; Saxmundham, Suffolk, IP17 1DZ; England; 52.213723°N 1.482927°E

Information
- Type: Free school
- Motto: Providing a foundation for life
- Department for Education URN: 138273 Tables
- Ofsted: Reports
- Head teacher: Malcom Short
- Gender: Mixed
- Age: 11 to 16
- Enrolment: 222
- Capacity: 600
- Website: saxmundhamschool.org.uk

SET Saxmundham School (formerly Saxmundham Free School) is a free school in Saxmundham, Suffolk, East Anglia, with approximately 222 pupils. It opened in 2012, replacing Saxmundham Middle School, with 105 pupils out of a total of 312 places available. It was rated "good" by Ofsted in May 2014. In March 2018 Ofsted carried out a short inspection of the school where it maintained its "good" rating. In a full inspection by Ofsted in January 2022 it was rated "inadequate". In June 2023 the Seckford Education Trust announced it would be closing the school in August 2024.

== Results ==
The School's first GCSE results, in August 2015, made it the third-worst performing school in Suffolk. The school's education trust, Seckford Education Trust, launched an external review in August 2015, after only 28% of the 47 pupils achieved five or more A* to C grades, including English and Maths. 19% of the pupils achieved the English Baccalaureate (EBacc). The results were criticised by Tim Coulson, regional schools commissioner for the east of England, in a warning letter. An excerpt of the letter read: "the secretary of state is satisfied that the standards of performance of pupils at Saxmundham Free School and Beccles Free School are unacceptably low".

The School received its third set of GCSE results in 2017, and continued its trend of improving its results year on year since opening. Although not a direct comparison, due to the new GCSE measures, the results show that GCSE performance has increased at the School by 28% in 2017 compared to 2016.

The School was fourth in Suffolk for the Progress 8 measure, with a score of 0.46, meaning all students progressed to achieve half a grade higher in their GCSEs than was predicted at age 11. Progress for English and maths is also incredibly strong and significantly above National outcomes, with 89% achieving a grade 4 or above in English and 73% achieving a grade 4 or above in maths.

In August 2018 63% of pupils achieved at least a Grade 4 in English and maths GCSE.

In its 2023 GCSE results just 12% of pupils achieved a Grade 5 or above in English and maths. Its Progress 8 score, a measure of pupils' progress in eight subjects from Key Stage 2 to Key Stage 4, was -1.01, a rating of "Well below average".

SET Saxmundham School is part of the Seckford Education Trust (The Trust) which also operates SET Beccles and SET Ixworth Schools as well as SET Causton Juniors and SET Maidstone Infants in Felixstowe. In this latest set of results, the Trust was 7th (out of 62) in the whole country in terms of student progress and was number 1 in the country for improving the performance of disadvantaged students.
