= Henry Bright (painter) =

English painter (1810–1873)

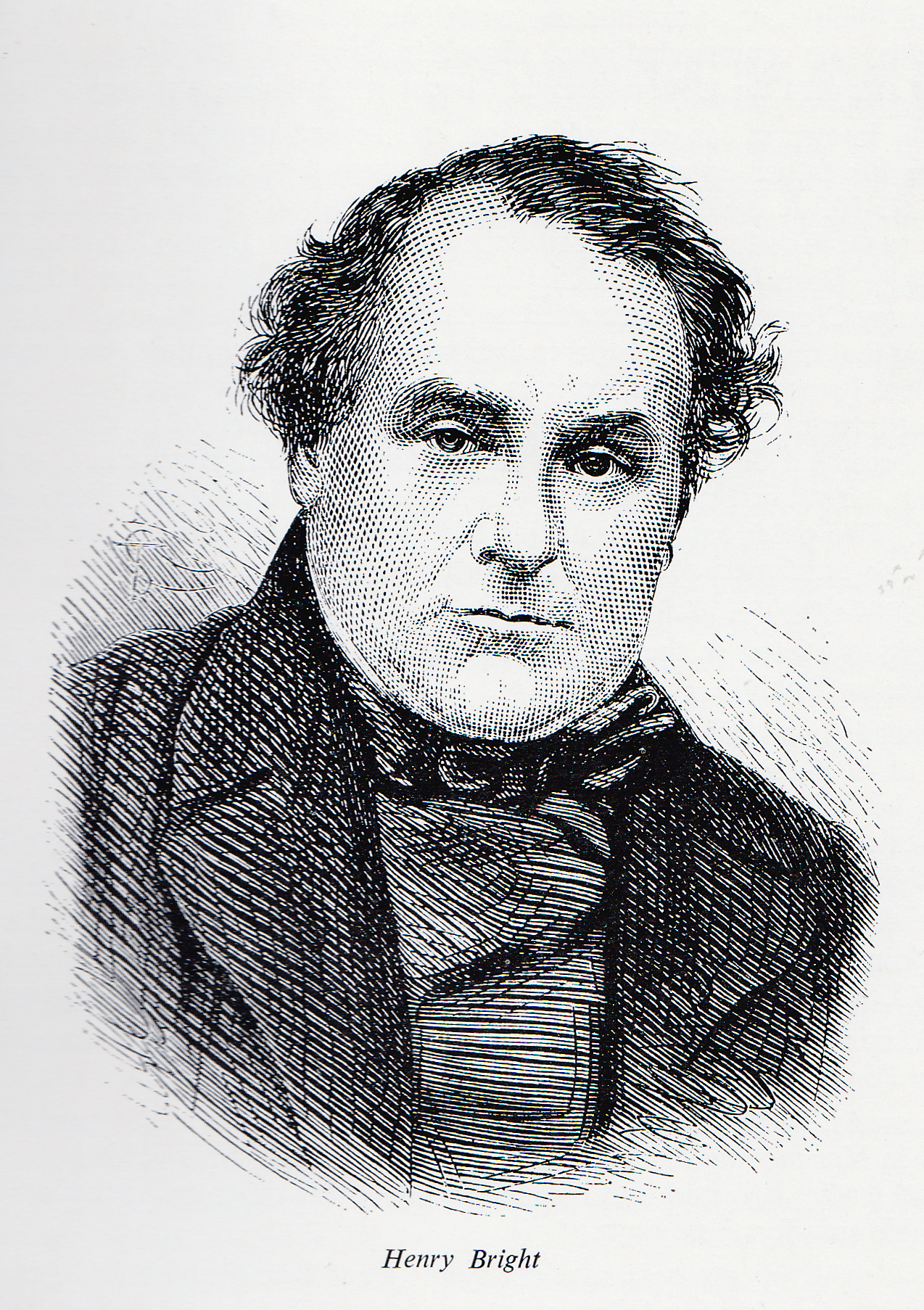
- Born: 5 June 1810; Saxmundham, Suffolk
- Died: 21 September 1873 (aged 63); Ipswich, Suffolk
- Education: trained by Alfred Stannard and John Berney Crome
- Known for: landscape painting
- Movement: Norwich School of painters
- Spouse: Eliza Brightley

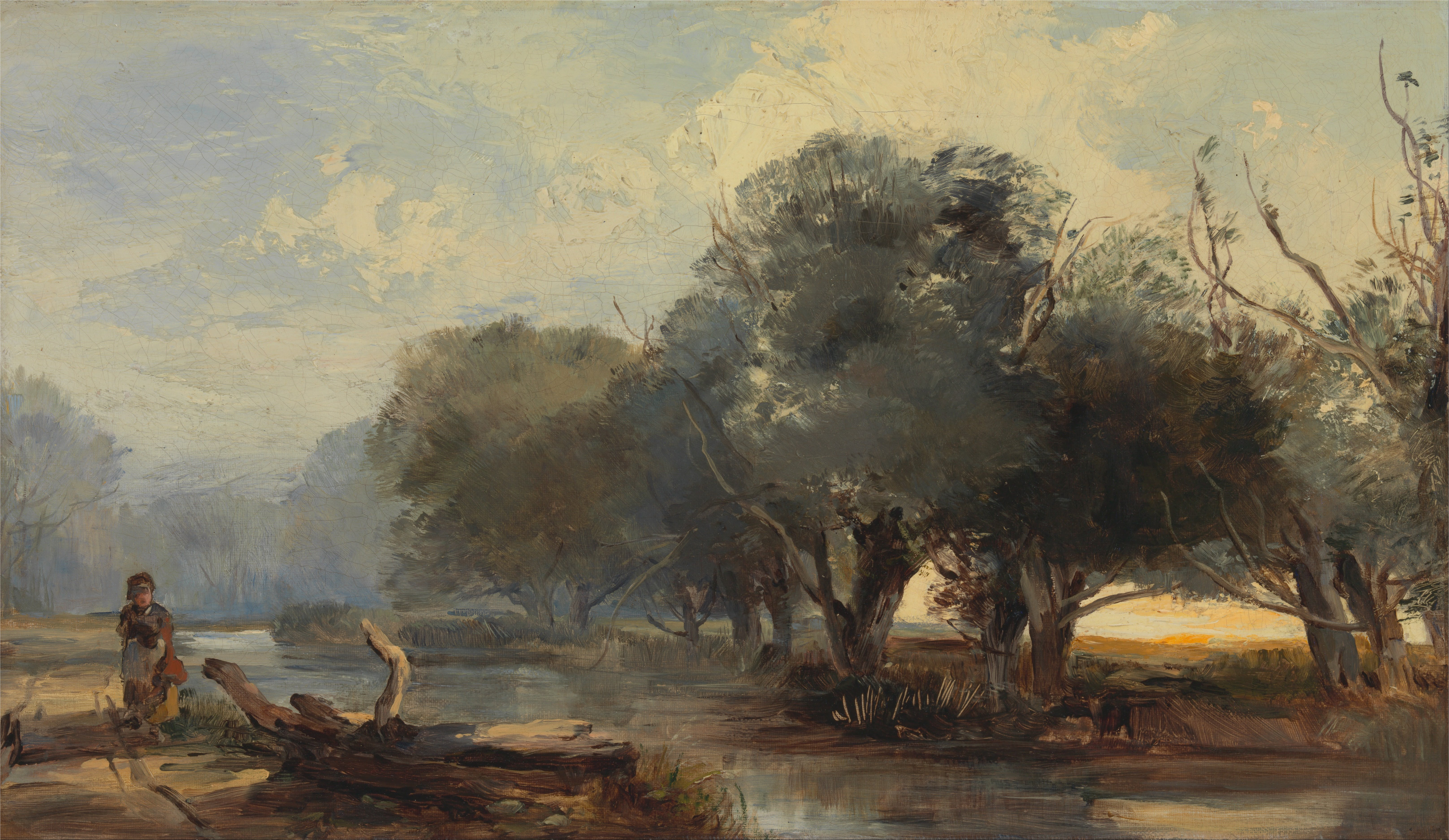
On the Norfolk Broads (c.1855), Yale Center for British Art

Henry Bright (5 June 1810 – 21 September 1873), was a distinguished English landscape painter associated with the Norwich School of painters.

== Life ==
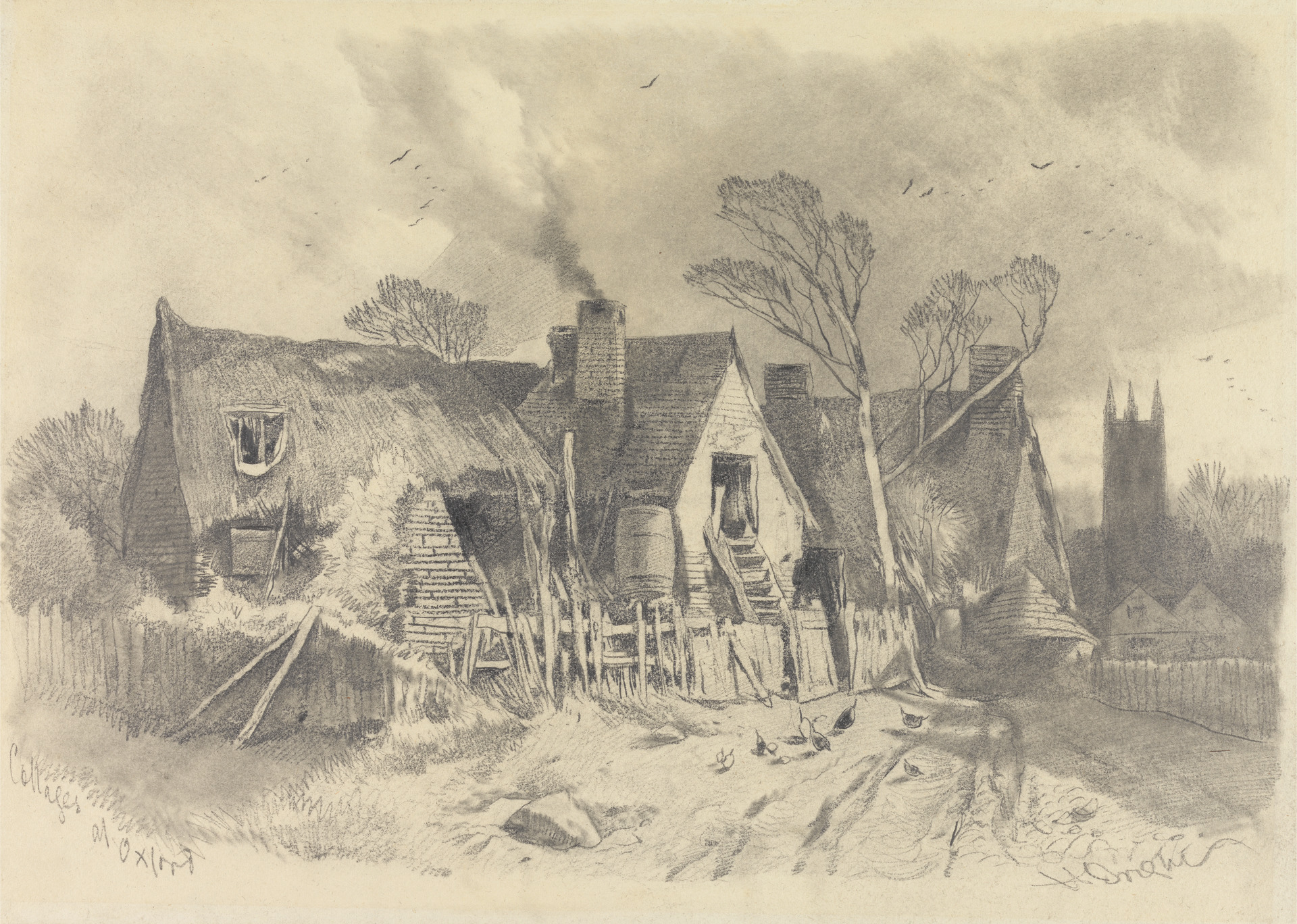
Cottages at Oxford (undated), Yale Center for British Art

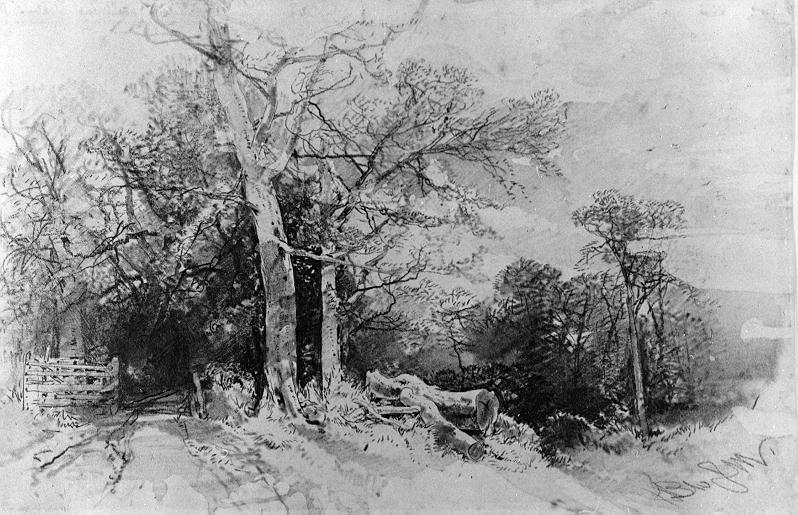
Trees with felled timber

Henry Bright was born on 5 June 1810 in Saxmundham, Suffolk, the third son of some nine children of Jerome Bright (1770–1846), a clockmaker, and Susannah Denny, of Alburgh in Norfolk, who were married on 28 June 1790. Jerome and Susannah Bright attended services in the Congregational chapel at Rendham, a few miles from Saxmundham. (Note: Saxmundham was described in the 1797 Universal British Directory as being "situated upon a hill, and has one large church, and a differing meeting house. The town consists of about 400 houses, which are in general pretty good ones; but the streets are narrow, and not paved. No particular manufacture is carried on here, and the town contains nothing remarkable". Nevertheless, notable residents were Henry's father, Jerome Bright, who was listed in G. H. Baillie's Watchmakers and Clockmakers of the World (1929), sculptor Thomas Thurlow and master craftsman in wood, Thomas Stopher.)

Bright was apprenticed by his family to a chemist in Woodbridge, Suffolk, but was then transferred to a Norwich chemist, Paul Squires. During this apprenticeship, or perhaps afterwards, he became a dispenser at the Norfolk and Norwich Hospital. During this period he is said to have spent all his free time sketching.

His obvious artistic talents were finally recognised and he became a pupil of Alfred Stannard. He is also said to have been trained by John Berney Crome and John Sell Cotman, both of whom were members of the Norwich Society of Artists.

About 1833 Bright returned to Saxmundham to marry a local girl, Eliza Brightley, on 8 May. Two of their children are known to have survived into adulthood. Bright moved with his family to Paddington in 1836. In 1848, the year they moved to Ealing, his wife Eliza died.

By 1854, Bright was living in St John's Wood, but left London in 1858 because of health reasons and settled with his daughters in his brother's house in Saxmundham. Bright continued to visit London for business reasons and to view exhibitions. From 1860, he lived at Redhill in Surrey. He also spent some time in Maidstone.

He died in Ipswich in 1873. (Note: The family vault bears the following inscriptions: "In Memory of Harriet, daughter of J & S Bright of Saxmundham who departed this life June 15th 1810 in the 16th year of her age also [Catherine] who died 1817 aged 21 years also of Alfred their 2nd Son who died Augt 1821 in the 20th year of his age Also of JEROME BRIGHT who died July 17th 1846 aged 76 years also of SUSANNAH BRIGHT who died Jan. 17th 1847 aged 76 years also of JEROME DENNY BRIGHT who died April 21st 1871 aged 79 years and also JANE FULLER BRIGHT who died July 10th 1876 aged 83 years; NEAR THIS PLACE LIES MARY THE WIFE OF J.D. BRIGHT OF SAXM SHE DIED OCTR 21ST 1825 AGED 29 YEARS")

== Works ==
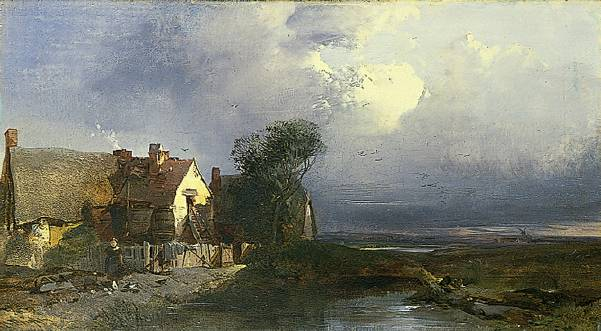
Effect after rain

Bright painted in various locations in England, Scotland, Wales and across Europe, working in oils, watercolour, chalk and pencil. During a few of these sketching expeditions he was accompanied by J. M. W. Turner, with whom he had struck up a friendship. Bright's work was also highly regarded by John Ruskin.

Bright's first major exhibition was at the British Institution, London in 1836. He exhibited at the Liverpool Academy exhibition that year as "Draughtsman in crayons to her Royal Highness the Langravine of Hesse Hamberg". He became a member of the New Society of Painters in Watercolours in 1839, where he exhibited until 1844. Although his obituary in The Art Journal stated that he did not exhibit in oils until the Royal Academy exhibition of 1845, this is not known for certain.

Bright developed friendships with other leading artists, including Samuel Prout, Henry Jutsum, David Cox, George Lance, William Collingwood Smith, William Leighton Leitch and James Duffield Harding. He was influenced by Harding's oil and pencil technique and, like him, issued a number of drawing-books in the 1840s. His use of chalk and stump on buff paper is similar to that of Robert Leman (1799–1863), while John Middleton strongly influenced his use of watercolour, particularly in around 1847.

Bright's name was also associated with the manufacture of coloured crayons. He established a profitable career teaching the titled and well-to-do, many of whom became his patrons. In 1844 Queen Victoria purchased Bright's Entrance to an Old Prussian Town (London, Royal Collection) from the New Society of Painters in Watercolours. He also received several commissions from the Grand Duchess Marie of Russia.

His professional success extended to working collaboratively with other artists, including John Frederick Herring and William Shayer, where Bright usually contributed the background. Throughout his career in London, Bright maintained links with the artists of the Norwich School of painters.

== Public collections ==
There is an extensive collection of Bright's paintings at the Norwich Castle Museum. He is also represented at major art galleries in London, Boston and San Francisco.

== Sources ==
- Day, Harold (1979). The Norwich School of Painters. Eastbourne Fine Art.
- Dickes, William Frederick (1905). The Norwich school of painting: being a full account of the Norwich exhibitions, the lives of the painters, the lists of their respective exhibits and descriptions of the pictures. Norwich: Jarrold & Sons Ltd.
- Moore, Andrew W. (1985). The Norwich School of Artists. Norwich: HMSO/Norwich Museums Service. ISBN 978-0-11-701587-6.
