= Kelsale =

Village in Suffolk, England

Coordinates: 52.231013°N 1.491972°E

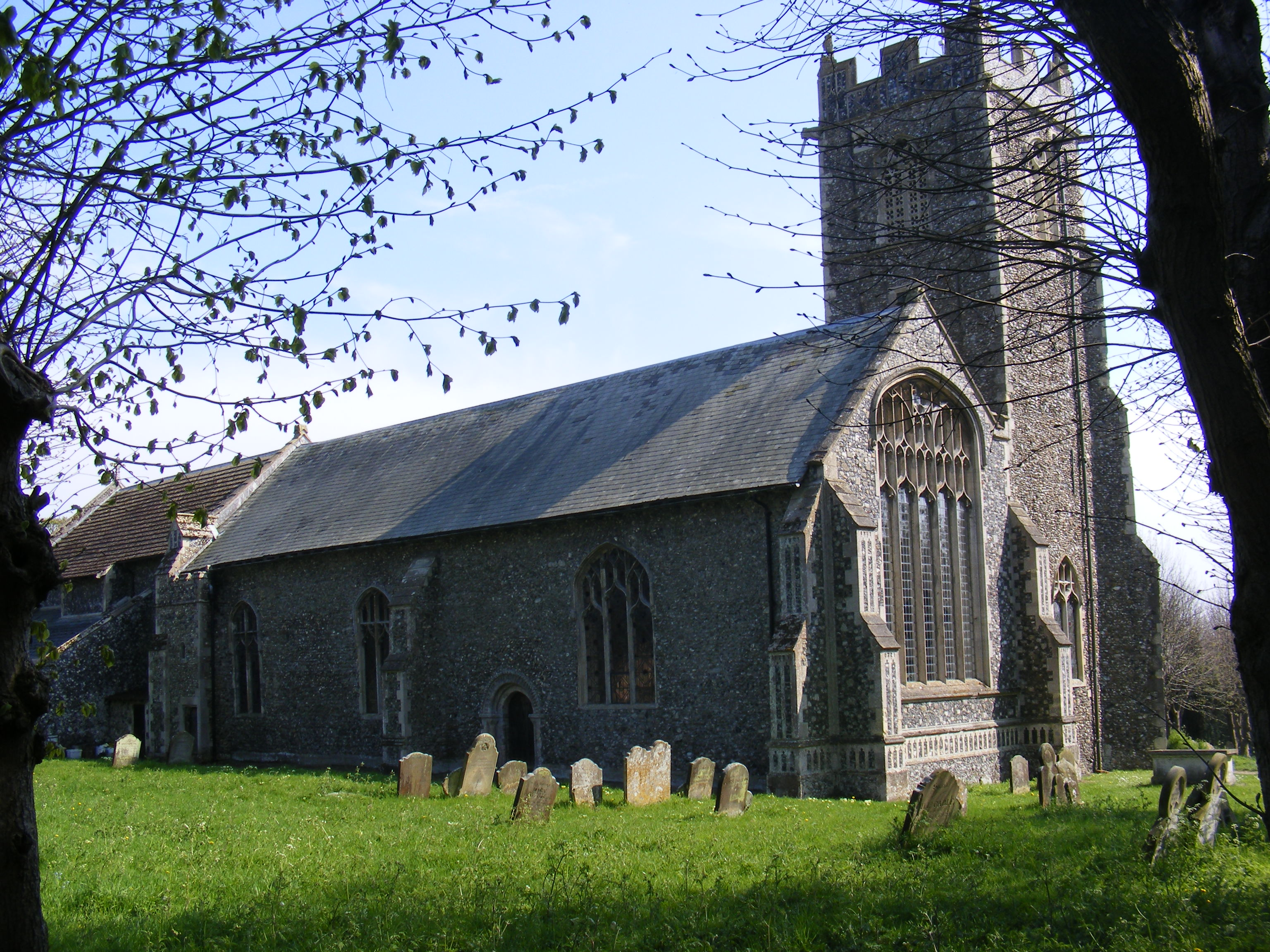
- Kelsale, Church of St Mary and St Peter

- Location within Suffolk
- Civil parish: Kelsale cum Carlton
- District: East Suffolk
- Shire county: Suffolk
- Region: East
- Country: England
- Sovereign state: United Kingdom
- Post town: Saxmundham
- Postcode district: IP17

Kelsale is a village and former civil parish, now in the parish of Kelsale cum Carlton, in the East Suffolk district, in the county of Suffolk, England. It is located approximately 1 mile north of Saxmundham town centre at the junction of the B1121 and the A12. In 1881 the civil parish had a population of 973.

== Notable buildings ==
In Kelsale village centre there is a former Guildhall built in 1495 that is now used as a training centre.

Kelsale has a primary school, Kelsale C of E VC Primary School, a Methodist Chapel and a Grade II* listed Village Hall. Situated below the Village Hall is a very popular committee-run Social Club & Bar.

On the hill, the Grade I listed Parish Church of St Mary and St Peter has a distinctive lych gate (1890) by Edward Schroeder Prior which is separately listed Grade II*. The church is medieval with a Victorian restoration of 1876-77 by Richard Norman Shaw and the nave was restored 1882-83 by E. S. Prior. Inside there is an elaborate pulpit dated before 1631 and a statue of Samuel Clouting by Thomas Thurlow of Saxmundham.
