= John Shipp (British Army officer) =

British soldier and author

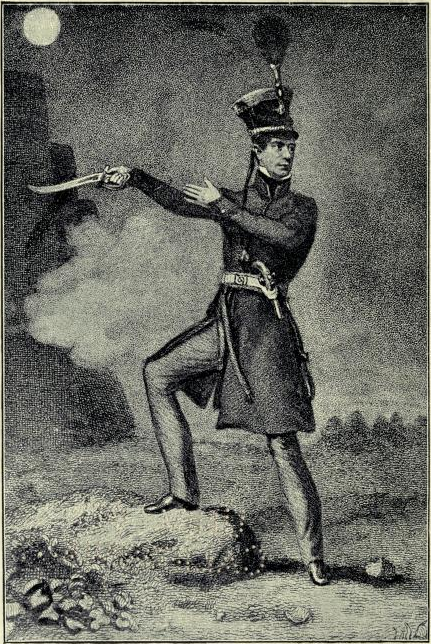
- John Shipp leading his troop into the fort of Huttrass in 1817
- Born: March 1784
- Died: 27 February 1834 (aged 49)
- Occupations: Soldier, author, playwright, inspector of police,
- Known for: Gallantry, memoirs

John Shipp (March 1784 – 27 February 1834) was a British soldier and writer best known for his memoirs, which were popular and ran to at least four editions. Shipp began his military career as a drummer boy at the age of ten and twice won commissions from the ranks due to his ability and conduct; he had to sell his first commission due to a lack of funds. He attained the rank of lieutenant in the 87th Regiment.

The Times reviewed the third edition of Shipp's memoir in 1890 where the work was listed as one of the "Books of the Week". The reviewer states that "for a man of little more than 30 to have twice won his commission from the ranks was ... an achievement unique in the annals of the British army".

== Early life ==
Shipp, younger son of Thomas Shipp, a marine, and his wife Lætitia, was born in Saxmundham, and was enchanted by the military from an early age. His mother died in poor circumstances in 1789, his elder brother was lost at sea, and John became an inmate of the parish poorhouse; he was apprenticed by the overseers to a neighbouring farmer, who repeatedly beat him and from whom he was glad to escape by enlistment as a boy in the 22nd (Cheshire) Regiment of Foot, at Colchester, on 17 January 1797.

== Military career ==
Through the kindness of his captain, he picked up some education, and, after service in the Channel Islands and the Cape, sailed for India, where, having risen to be a sergeant in the grenadier company, he served against the Mahrattas under Lord Lake. He was one of the stormers at the capture of Deig on 24 December 1804, and thrice led the forlorn hope of the storming column in the unsuccessful assaults on Bhurtpore (January–February 1805). He was severely wounded, but his daring was rewarded by Lord Lake with an ensigncy in the 65th foot. On 10 March in the same year, he was gazetted lieutenant in the 76th foot.

Returning home after two and a half years' further service, he found himself constrained to sell out on 19 March 1808 in order to obtain a sum (about £250) to pay his debts. After a short interval he found himself in London without money, and decided to again enlist in the ranks. He returned to India as a private in the 24th Light Dragoons, and rose by 1812 to the position of regimental sergeant-major. In May 1815, Francis Rawdon Hastings, 1st Marquis of Hastings and 2nd Earl of Moira, reappointed him to an ensigncy in the 87th Prince's own Irish fusiliers, then recently arrived in India from Mauritius. Shipp had thus performed the unique feat of twice winning a commission from the ranks before he was thirty-two.

Shipp distinguished himself greatly by his bravery in the second campaign of the Ghorka war, notably in a single combat with one of the enemy's sirdars near Muckwanpore. He was on the staff of the left division of the 'grand army' under the Marquis of Hastings in the Mahratta and Pindaree war (1817–18), and was promoted lieutenant on 5 July 1821.

He seems to have been highly popular in his regiment for his gallantry in the field; but during 1822, while quartered at Calcutta, he was inveigled into a series of bets on horse races which proved highly disastrous. Shipp was imprudent enough to reflect in writing upon the behaviour of a superior officer in regard to these transactions, and was discharged from the service by a court-martial held at Fort William on 14–27 July 1823. He was, however, recommended to mercy, 'in consideration of his past services and wounds, and the high character that he had borne as an officer and a gentleman.’ On selling out, on 3 November 1825, the East India Company granted him a pension of £50, upon which he settled near Ealing in Middlesex.

== Later life ==
Shipp now turned his hand to relating some of his experiences in his 1829 autobiography. Two years later, he issued Flogging and its Substitute: a Voice from the Ranks, in the form of a letter to Sir Francis Burdett, being a powerful indictment of the detestable barbarities of the cat, which, as the author maintained, 'flogged one devil out and fifty devils in.' Burdett sent the writer a sum of £50, and most of his suggestions were adopted by the military authorities.

In 1830, Shipp was offered an inspectorship in the Stepney division of metropolitan police by Sir Charles Rowan; he was shortly afterwards appointed superintendent of the night watch at Liverpool, and in 1833 was elected master of the workhouse at Liverpool, where he was highly esteemed.

Shipp died at Liverpool, in easy circumstances, on 27 February 1834. He twice married, and left a widow with children.

His obituary is featured in The Annual Register, Or, A View of the History, Politics, and Literature of the Year 1834:

At Liverpool, of pleurisy, aged 50, lieut. John Shipp, author of Memoirs of his “ Extraordinary Military Career", published in 1829. From his first entrance into the army, at Colchester, as a drummer, at the age of nine, he wore the king’s uniform for thirty-two years; and received six match-lock ball wounds, one on the forehead, two on the top of the head, and in the right arm, one through the forefinger of his left hand, and one in his right leg; besides a flesh wound in his left shoulder, and others of minor consequence. He was the author of at least two plays, one entitled “ The Shepherdess of Arranville, or, Father and Daughter, a pathetic tale, in three acts", 1826; and the other, “ The Maniac of the Pyrenees, or the Heroic Soldier’s Wife, a melodrama, in two acts", 1829. These were printed at Brentford. In the spring of 1830, he was appointed an inspector of the new police; and, during the riots on lord mayor's day that year, he was knocked down, and severely hurt on the side. He was afterwards governor of the workhouse at Liverpool.

== Writings ==
Shipp's memoirs (Memoirs of the extraordinary military career of John Shipp, late a lieut. in His Majesty's 87th regiment) tell his life story from his youth, admiring the recruiting band, through his entire military career, and include extensive reflection as well as narrative. The volumes were reprinted several times over the succeeding century.

Shipp's memoirs were first published c. 1829, subsequent editions were revised by the addition of material relating to his court-martial, and in 1890 with an introduction by Henry Manners Chichester, who also selected illustrations and corrected the text. The 1930 edition is without the introduction and illustrations.

Shipp also published:

- The Military Bijou, or the Contents of a Soldier's Knapsack, 1831, duodecimo
- The Eastern Story Teller: a Collection of Indian Tales, 1832, duodecimo
- The Soldier's Friend, 1833, duodecimo

He was also the author of two melodramas, The Shepherdess of Aranville, or Father and Daughter, and The Maniac of the Pyrenees (Brentford, 1826 and 1829).

== Portrait ==
A full-length portrait by Wageman, representing him leading his troop into the fort of Huttrass in 1817, was engraved by Holl, and was reproduced for the 'Memoirs' (1890); (see above) another portrait was engraved by W. T. Fry after John Buchanan.
