= Saxmundham =

Town in Suffolk, England

Coordinates: 52.215°N 1.487°E

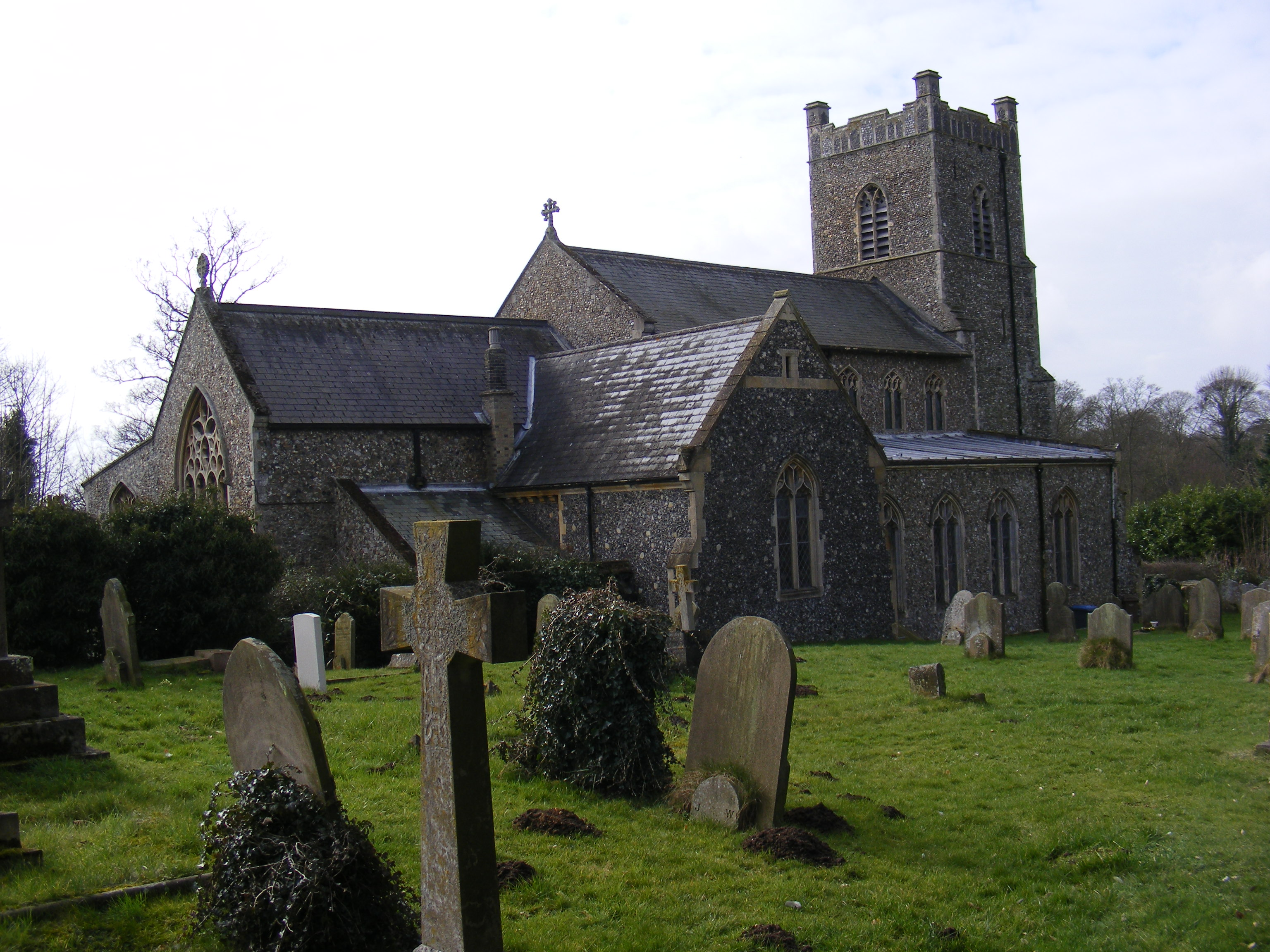
- St John the Baptist Church, Saxmundham

- Location within Suffolk
- Population: 3,644 (2011 Census)
- OS grid reference: TM381632
- Civil parish: Saxmundham
- District: East Suffolk
- Shire county: Suffolk
- Region: East
- Country: England
- Sovereign state: United Kingdom
- Post town: SAXMUNDHAM
- Postcode district: IP17
- Dialling code: 01728
- Police: Suffolk
- Fire: Suffolk
- Ambulance: East of England
- UK Parliament: Suffolk Coastal

Saxmundham (/sæksˈmʌndəm/ saks-MUN-dəm) is a market town and civil parish in the East Suffolk district, in the county Suffolk, England. It is set in the valley of the River Fromus, about 18 miles (29 km) north-east of Ipswich and 5 miles (8 km) west of the coast at Sizewell. The town is bypassed by the main A12 road between London and Lowestoft. The town is served by Saxmundham railway station on the East Suffolk Line between Ipswich and Lowestoft. In 2021 the parish had a population of 4,777.

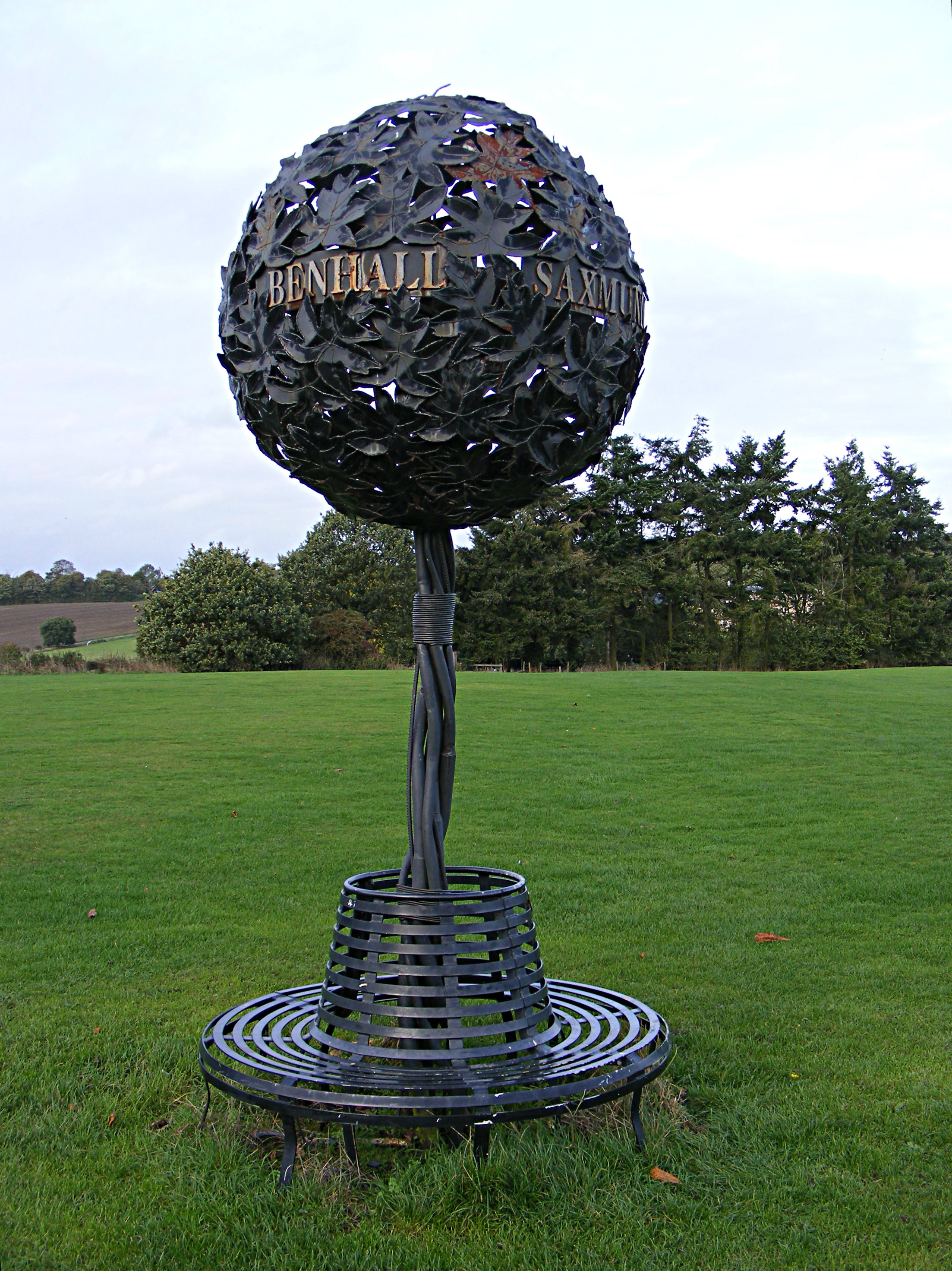
Seat on Saxmundham Recreation Ground with names of nearby Benhall parish and Kelsale village

== Governance ==
The district electoral ward also has the name Saxmundham. Its population at the 2011 census was 4,913.

As of February 2024, Saxmundham Town Council consisted of eleven councillors.

Marianne Kiff
Benjamin Alexander Gulliford
James Sandbach
Geraldine Barker
Charlotte Hawkins
John Fisher
Tim Lock
John Findlay
Jeremy Smith
Di Eastman
Elizabeth Clark

The Town Clerk is Mrs Sharon Smith.

In 1894 Saxmundham became part of Plomesgate Rural District, in 1900 Saxmundham became an urban district, containing the parish Saxmundham. On 1 April 1974 the district and parish were abolished and became part of Suffolk Coastal district in the non-metropolitan county of Suffolk. A successor parish was formed covering the same area as the former district and its parish. In 2019 it became part of East Suffolk district.

== Heritage ==
The place-name Saxmundham is first attested in the Domesday Book of 1086 as Sasmunde(s)ham. It appears as Saxmundham in the Feet of Fines of 1213. The name denotes "Seaxmund's village or estate".

The Parish Church of St John the Baptist dates back to the 11th century. Some features remain from the medieval period, but its present appearance owes most to the 19th century. Much of the church's official architectural guide, with accounts of its medieval remnants, can be read on the Town Council site.

== Facilities ==
Saxmundham has facilities for overnight, bed-and-breakfast and camping accommodation.

It has had a market charter since at least 1272, and holds a market every Wednesday in the Market Place just off the High Street, with indoor and outdoor stalls.

== Notable residents ==
With a Wikipedia page, in birth order:

- John Shipp (1784–1834), army officer, was born in Saxmundham. His military memoirs were widely read in the 19th century.
- Henry Bright (1810–1873), painter.
- Thomas Thurlow (1813–1899), sculptor.
- Hamlet Watling (1818–1908), archaeologist, illustrator and schoolmaster.
- Bernard Collins (1880–1951), county cricketer, also wrote a book on life after death: Death is Not the End (London: Psychic Press, 1939).
- Buck Read (1880–1970), American basketball coach, was born in Saxmundham.
- Herbert Heyner (1882–1954), baritone, died here.
- Jennifer Toombs (1940–2018), stamp designer.
- Eleanor Berwick (born 1943), wine-grower.
- Maggi Hambling (born 1945), artist, has lived in a cottage near Saxmundham since the mid-1980s.
- Sam Miller (born 1962) works as a television director.
- Ray Allen (born 1975), NBA All-Star, spent some childhood years in Saxmundham.

== In fiction ==
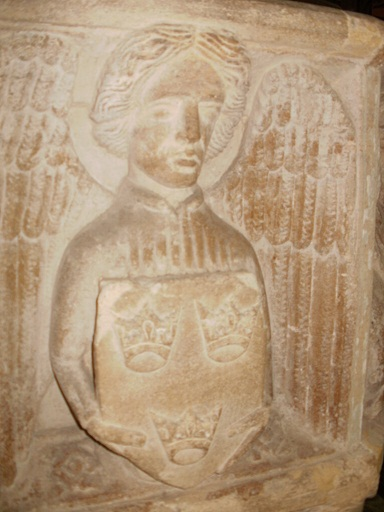
Carving of an angel holding a Three Crowns emblem on the baptismal font (c.1400) in the parish church of St John the Baptist; the crowns are a symbol of East Anglia.

Brother Eadulf has become Saxmundham's most famous international fictional character, through the best-selling Sister Fidelma mysteries by Peter Tremayne (a pseudonym of the Celtic scholar and author Peter Berresford Ellis). Brother Eadulf, as companion and assistant to Sister Fidelma, often plays a crucial part in resolving the mystery. He is introduced as originally the hereditary gerefa (magistrate) of "Seaxmund's Ham in the land of the South Folk." He attends the famous Synod of Whitby in AD 664 and joins Sister Fidelma in solving a murder of one of the delegates (Absolution by Murder, 1994). He has since appeared in most of the novels and some of the short stories, although the Saxmundham area has been used as a setting in only two of the novels: The Haunted Abbot (2002) and “The Grave of the Lawgiver” (2025). Tremayne chose Saxmundham as Eadulf's place of origin because of local connections, the nearness of the town to an ancient royal burial site of the East Angles, and the historic East Anglian connections with Irish Christian missionaries. He appears in all but two of the Sister Fidelma series of mystery novels, set in 7th century Ireland.

The series has now reached 31 published titles, appearing in a score of languages. An International Sister Fidelma Society, devoted to the author and his work, has existed for 20 years and publishes a 20-page colour magazine three times a year.

== See also ==
- SET Saxmundham School
- Saxmundham railway station
