= Milo Crispin =

Milo Crispin (died 1149?) was cantor of the Benedictine Abbey of Bec. He wrote the lives of five of its abbots: Lanfranc, Archbishop of Canterbury, Gulielmus de Bellomonte, Boso, Theobaldus, and Letardus.

== Biography and works ==
His life of Lanfranc is printed in the Acta Sanctorum of the Bollandists (May 28). The other four (those of Theobaldus and Letardus being mere summaries) are included in the Patrologia Latina (Vol. CL).

Milo must have been an old man when he wrote them, for in the last chapter of his life of Lanfranc he relates something which he himself heard Anselm say. As Anselm died in 1109, and Letardus did not die till 1149, Milo Crispin shows here incidentally that his own religious life had lasted more than forty years.

He came of the noble family of Crispin descended from the Neustrian, Gislebert, who first received the name Crispin because of his erect curly hair. All Gislebert's sons distinguished themselves, and the family proved generous benefactors to the Abbey of Bec. Two of his descendants subsequently became monks there: Gilbert, afterwards Abbot of Westminster, who wrote the life of Herluin of Bec, founder and first Abbot of Bec; and his brother Milo. No details of the latter's career have been preserved, nor is it known when he died.
