= Guitmund =

Benedictine theologian and bishop

The Norman Guitmund (died c. 1090–1095), Bishop of Aversa, was a Benedictine monk who was an opponent of the teachings of Berengar of Tours.

== Life ==
=== Early life ===
In his youth Guitmund entered the monastery of La-Croix-Saint-Leufroy in the Diocese of Évreux. By 1060 he was studying theology at the Abbey of Bec, where he had Lanfranc as teacher and Anselm as a fellow-student, each of them later Archbishop of Canterbury. In 1070 William the Conqueror called him to take up a diocese in England, but Guitmund rejected the offer after witnessing in England to William's brutality and oppression of the English people. Guitmund answered William with his Oratio ad Guillelmum, denouncing the Norman Conquest.

In his native Normandy, Guitmund defended the doctrine of transubstantiation against Berengar of Tours. During the 1070s he wrote a treatise on the Holy Eucharist, entitled De corporis et sanguinis Jesu Christi veritate in Eucharistia ("On the body and blood of Jesus Christ truly in the Eucharist"), which takes the familiar literary form of a dialogue between himself and a fellow monk, Roger, to present the doctrine of the real presence of Christ in the Eucharist. He attributes the perceived decay of the reserved sacrament, not as an accident of its essential substance (the orthodox view), but merely as a deception of our senses. The first printed edition of Guitmund's De corporis et sanguinis was edited by Erasmus (Freiburg, 1530).

=== In Italy ===
Shortly after Guitmund had published his treatise against Berengar, he obtained permission from his abbot, Odilo, to make a pilgrimage to Rome, where he lived for a time in a Roman monastery under the pseudonym of Christianus, which afforded him obscurity. According to the Historiae Ecclesiasticae written by Ordericus Vitalis, he was made a cardinal by Pope Gregory VII. However, August Prévost, Ordericus' editor, states: "Guitmond n'a jamais été élevé au cardinalat." Paul Fridolin Kehr, too, denies the cardinalate.

It remains more certain that he was appointed by pope Gregory VII to a papal legation north of the Alps and that he remained in Rome after Gregory's death. Pope Urban II, formerly a monk at the Abbey of Cluny, appointed Guitmund as Bishop of Aversa at the Synod of Melfi in September 1089. Guitmund is thought to have died in Aversa around the year 1095.

== Bibliography ==
- Dell'Omo, M. (1993). "Per la storia dei monaci-vescovi nell'Italia normanna del secolo XI: ricerche biografiche su Guitmondo di La Croix-Saint-Leufroy, vescovo di Aversa", in: Benedictina 40 (1993), pp. 9–34. (in Italian)
- Kamp, Norbert (2000). "Le fonti per una biografia di Guitmondo d’Aversa," in: Guitmondo di Aversa, la cultura europea e la riforma gregoriana nel mezzogiorno..., vol. I, pp. 137 ff.
- Orabona, L. (ed.) (2000). Guitmondo di Aversa, la cultura europea e la riforma gregoriana nel mezzogiorno. Atti del Convegno internazionale di studi, Cassino-Aversa, 13-14-15 novembre 1997. 2 vols. Napoli-Roma 2000. (in Italian)
- Shaughnessy, P. (1939). The Eucharistic Doctrine of Guitmund of Aversa. Roma 1939.
- Vaillancourt, Mark G. (2009). On the Body and Blood of the Lord; On the Truth of the Body and Blood of Christ in the Eucharist. CUA Press. ISBN 978-0-8132-1678-2.

Catholic Encyclopedia: "Guitmund"
