= Thomas Frique =

28th Abbot of Le Bec

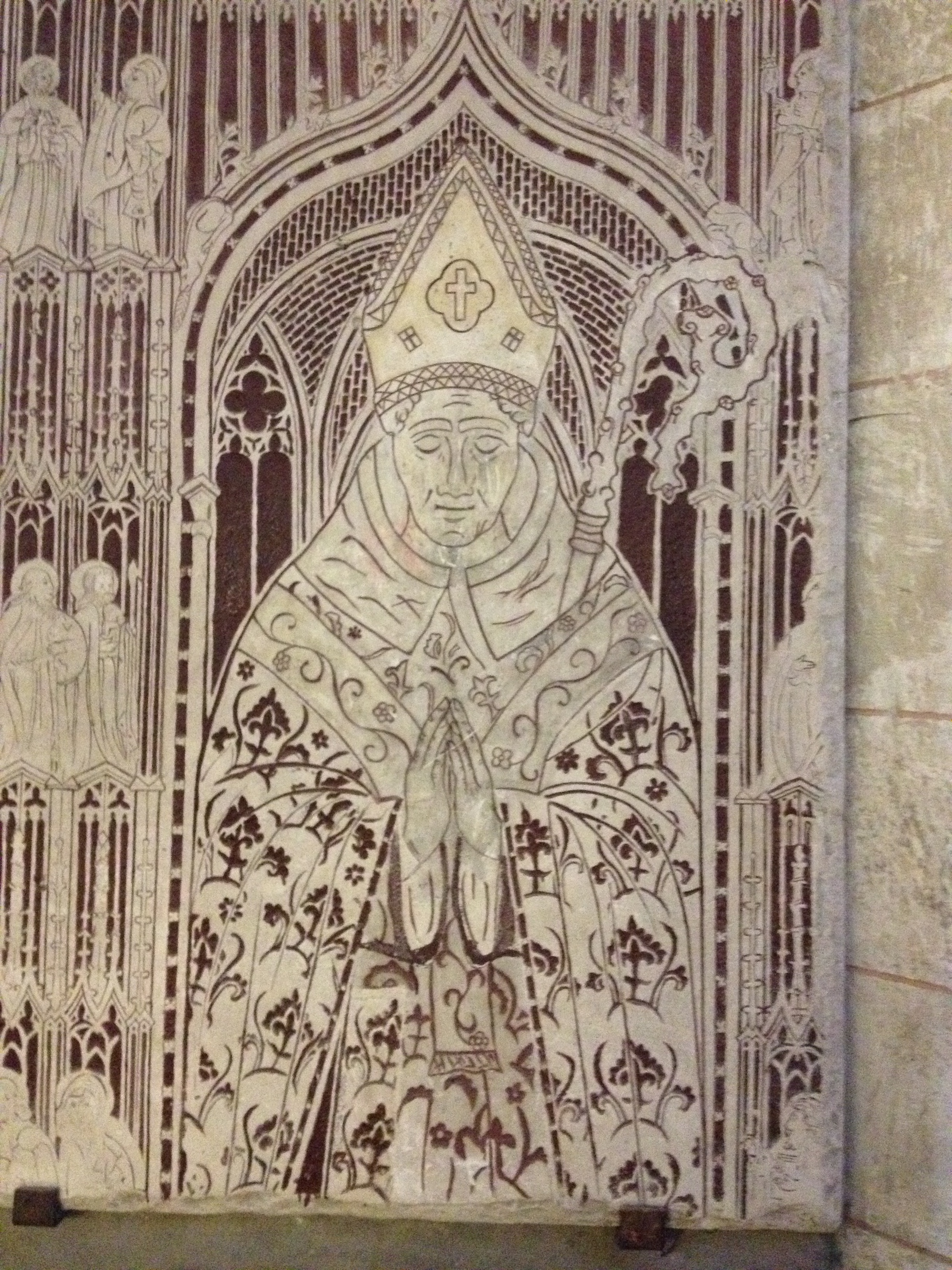
Thomas Frique

Thomas Frique or Thomas du Bec († 5 July 1446) was the 28th abbot of Le Bec.

== Biography ==
Originally from Le Bec Abbey, he was prior of the abbey before succeeding Robert III Vallée in 1430. Although Abbott at Bec he lived most of the time in Rouen, because of the wars that ravaged the province at the time.

On 24 May 1431 he was present at the trial of Joan of Arc, but was not called as a judge, as was the case for the abbots of Fécamp, Jumièges and Cormeilles. In October he was present at the consecration of Jean de la Chaussée, abbot of Jumièges.

He died on 5 July 1446 and was buried next to Guillaume d'Auvillars in the abbey church. His funerary slab, stolen during the French Revolution, is offered and kept at the Sainte-Croix church in Bernay.
