= Gilbert Crispin =

Abbot of Westminster

Gilbert Crispin (c. 1055 – 1117) was a Christian author and Anglo-Norman monk, appointed by Archbishop Lanfranc in 1085 to be the abbot, proctor and servant of Westminster Abbey, England. Gilbert became the third Norman Abbot of Westminster to be appointed after the Norman Conquest, succeeding Abbot Vitalis of Bernay.

== Biography ==
He was probably the grandson of Gislebert Crispin, Baron of Bec, although the Crispin line is notoriously convoluted and uncertain. His father may have been William Crispin, and his mother Eve the daughter of Simon de Montfort l'Aumary. He was closely related to Robert Crispin (Latin Ro(d)bertus Crispinus) a Norman mercenary who died in 1073.

Gilbert was a young monk under Saint Anselm at the Abbey of Bec, Normandy. There Gilbert was said to have: "become a perfect scholar in all the liberal arts". In 1093 Anselm became Archbishop of Canterbury. Gilbert promoted Anselm's arguments in his disputes with King Henry I of England. Gilbert was probably useful to Anselm's cause, since he apparently also acted as a general administrator to the King.

Gilbert's own careful and subtle writings opened a dialogue between the Christian and Jewish faiths, which may possibly have drawn on earlier (and now lost) work by an anonymous writer from the time of Charlemagne. Gilbert also wrote the life of Herluin (Vita Herluini), the knight-founder and first Abbot of Bec, and created many other works.

On Gilbert's death there was no Abbot appointed for four years. Much of Gilbert's organisational work was thus undone, until the appointment of Abbot Herbert in 1121 stabilised matters somewhat. Gilbert's tomb can be seen in Westminster Abbey, in the 'south walk'.

Gilbert's brother was Milo Crispin (d. 1149), precentor at the monastery at the Abbey of Bec. Milo wrote the Vita Lanfranci that drew on his brother Gilbert's Vita Herluini. Gilbert is also believed to be related to Miles Crispin of Wallingford.
