= Bec Abbey =

Benedictine monastic foundation in Normandy, France

Coordinates: 49.2288°N 0.7220°E

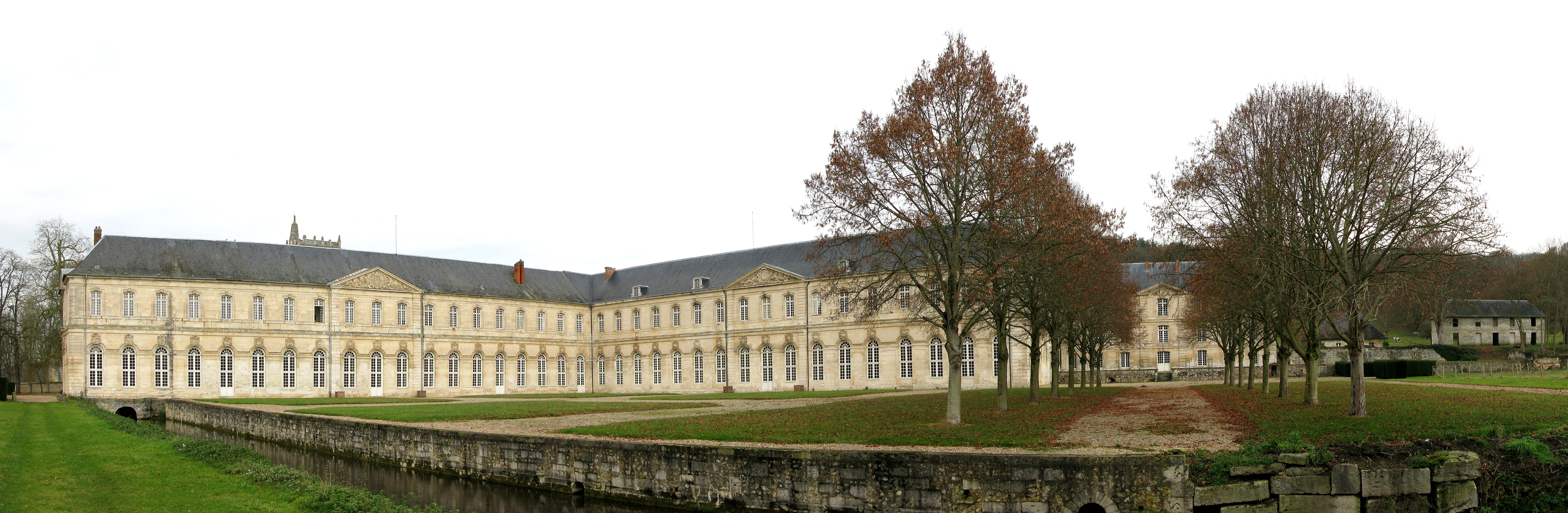
South side of the abbey, the church and the monks' cells seen from Le Bec-Hellouin

Bec Abbey, formally the Abbey of Our Lady of Bec (French: Abbaye Notre-Dame du Bec), is a Benedictine monastic foundation in the Eure département, in the Bec valley midway between the cities of Rouen and Bernay. It is located in Le Bec-Hellouin, Normandy, France, and was the most influential abbey of the 12th-century Anglo-Norman kingdom.

Like all abbeys, Bec maintained annals of the house but uniquely its first abbots also received individual biographies, brought together by the monk of Bec, Milo Crispin. Because of the abbey's cross-Channel influence, these hagiographic lives sometimes disclose historical information of more than local importance.

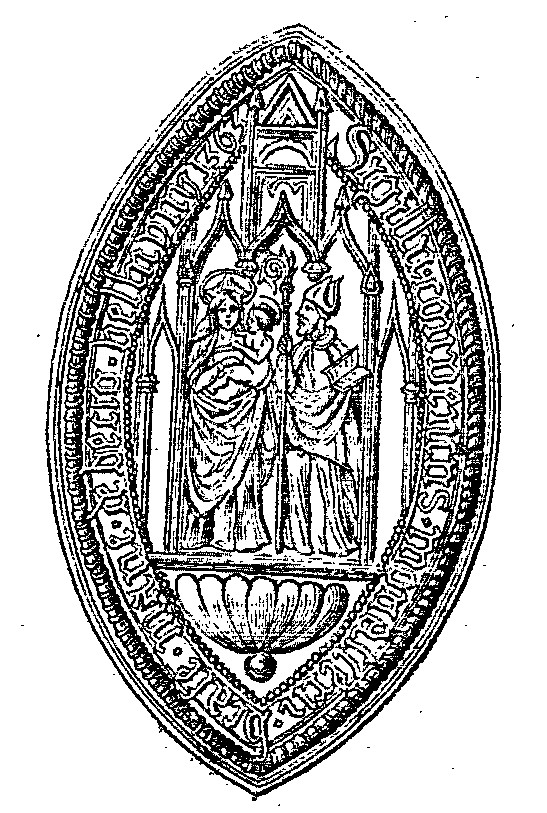
Seal Abbaye du Bec.

== Name ==
The name of the abbey derives from the bec, or stream, that runs nearby. The word derives from the Scandinavian root, bekkr.

== First foundation ==
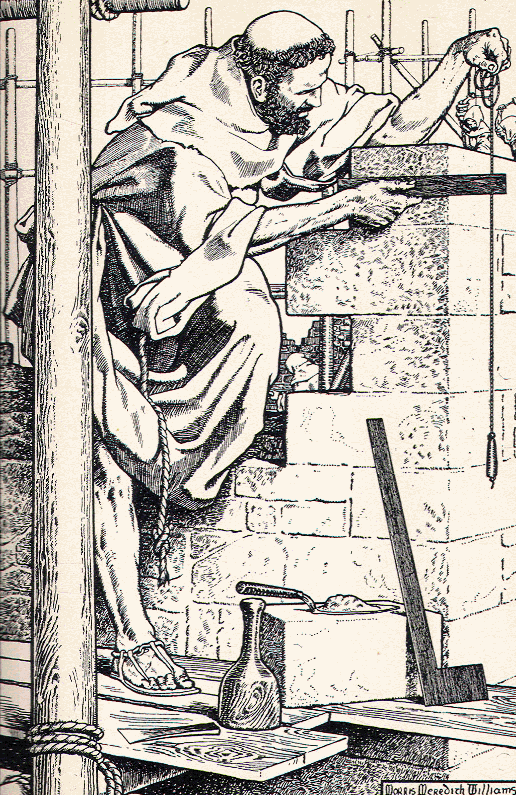
"Herlwin Building His First Church", from E.M. Wilmot-Buxton's 1915 Anselm.

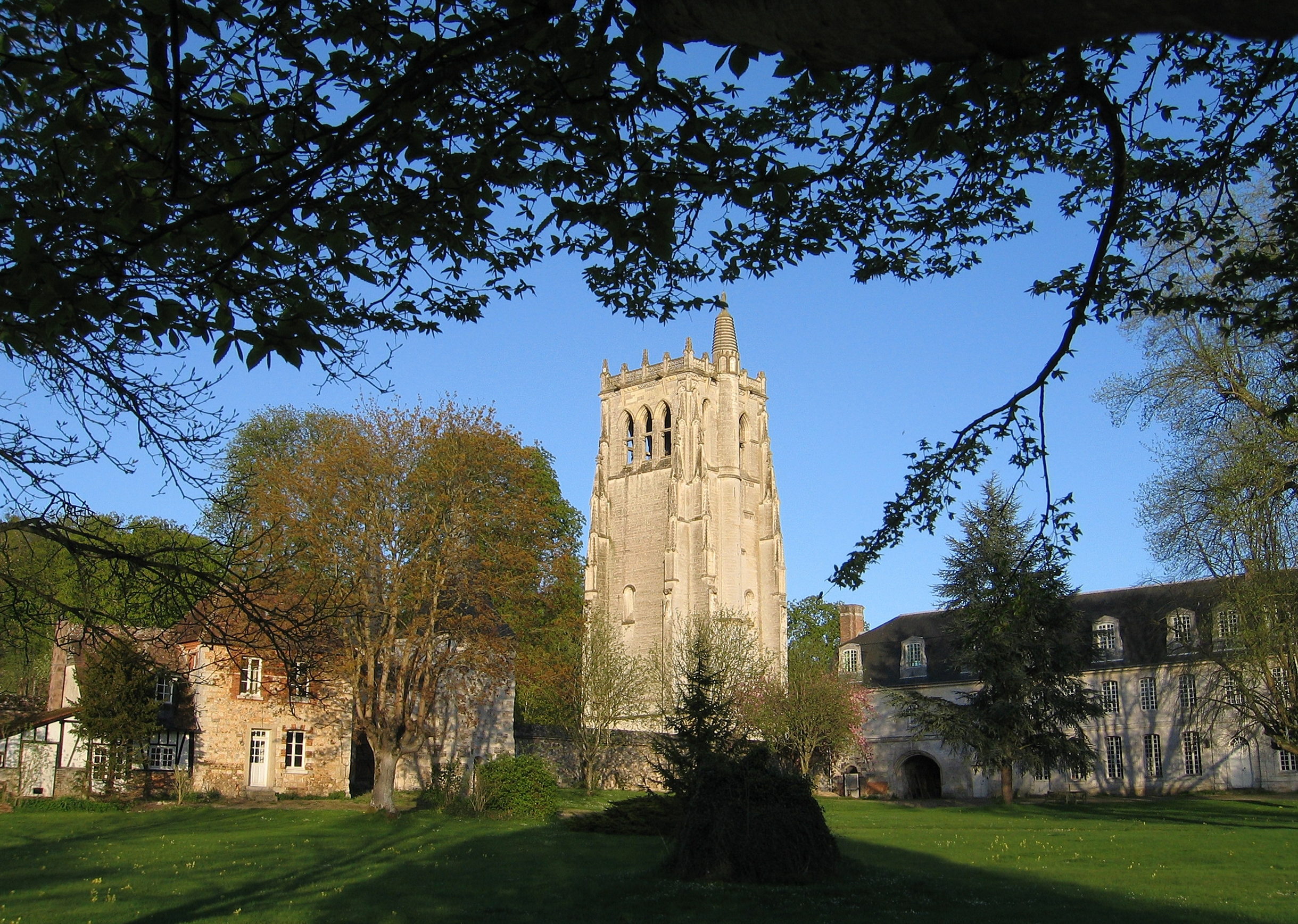
West side of the Tour Saint-Nicolas, between the ancient pottery to its left and the monks' residential building to its right

The abbey was founded in 1034 by Saint Herluin, (Note: Not to be confused with Herluin, father of Odo of Bayeux and Robert of Mortain) whose life was written by Gilbert Crispin, Abbot of Westminster, formerly of Bec, and collated with three other lives by Milo Crispin. Abbey construction began in 1034 and continued through 1035. Further lands were added through 1040. Saint Herluin was a Norman knight who in about 1031 left the court of Gilbert, Count of Brionne, to devote himself to a life of religion: the commune of Le Bec Hellouin preserves his name. One hundred and thirty-six monks made their profession while Herluin was in charge.

Already an important part of the revival of Norman monasticism, with the arrival of Lanfranc of Pavia, Bec became a focus of 11th century intellectual life. Lanfranc, who was already famous for his lectures at Avranches, came to teach as prior and master of the monastic school, but left in 1062, to become abbot of St. Stephen's Abbey, Caen, and later Archbishop of Canterbury. He was followed as abbot by Anselm, also later an Archbishop of Canterbury, as was the fifth abbot, Theobald of Bec. Many distinguished ecclesiastics, probably including the future Pope Alexander II and Saint Ivo of Chartres, were educated in the school at Bec.

The life of the founder (Vita Herluini) was written by Gilbert Crispin. Archbishop Lanfranc also wrote a Chronicon Beccense of the life of Herlui. Milo Crispin's biography of the first four abbots was published at Paris in 1648.

The followers of William the Conqueror supported the abbey, enriching it with extensive properties in England. Bec also owned and managed St Neots Priory, now in Cambridgeshire, as well as a number of other British foundations, including Goldcliff Priory in Monmouthshire founded in 1113 by Robert de Chandos. The village of Tooting Bec, now a London suburb in Wandsworth, is so named because the abbey owned the land.

Bec Abbey was the original burial place of the Empress Matilda, whose bones were later transferred to Rouen Cathedral, where they remain.

Bec Abbey was damaged during the Wars of Religion and left a ruin in the French Revolution but the 15th-century St. Nicholas Tower (Tour Saint-Nicolas) from the medieval monastery is still standing.

== Second foundation ==
In 1948 the site was re-established as the Abbaye de Notre-Dame du Bec by Olivetan monks led by Dom Grammont, who effected some restorations. The abbey is known for its links with Anglicanism and has been visited by successive archbishops of Canterbury. The abbey library contains the John Graham Bishop deposit of 5,000 works concerning Anglicanism.

Today the Abbey is probably best known for the pottery the monks produce.

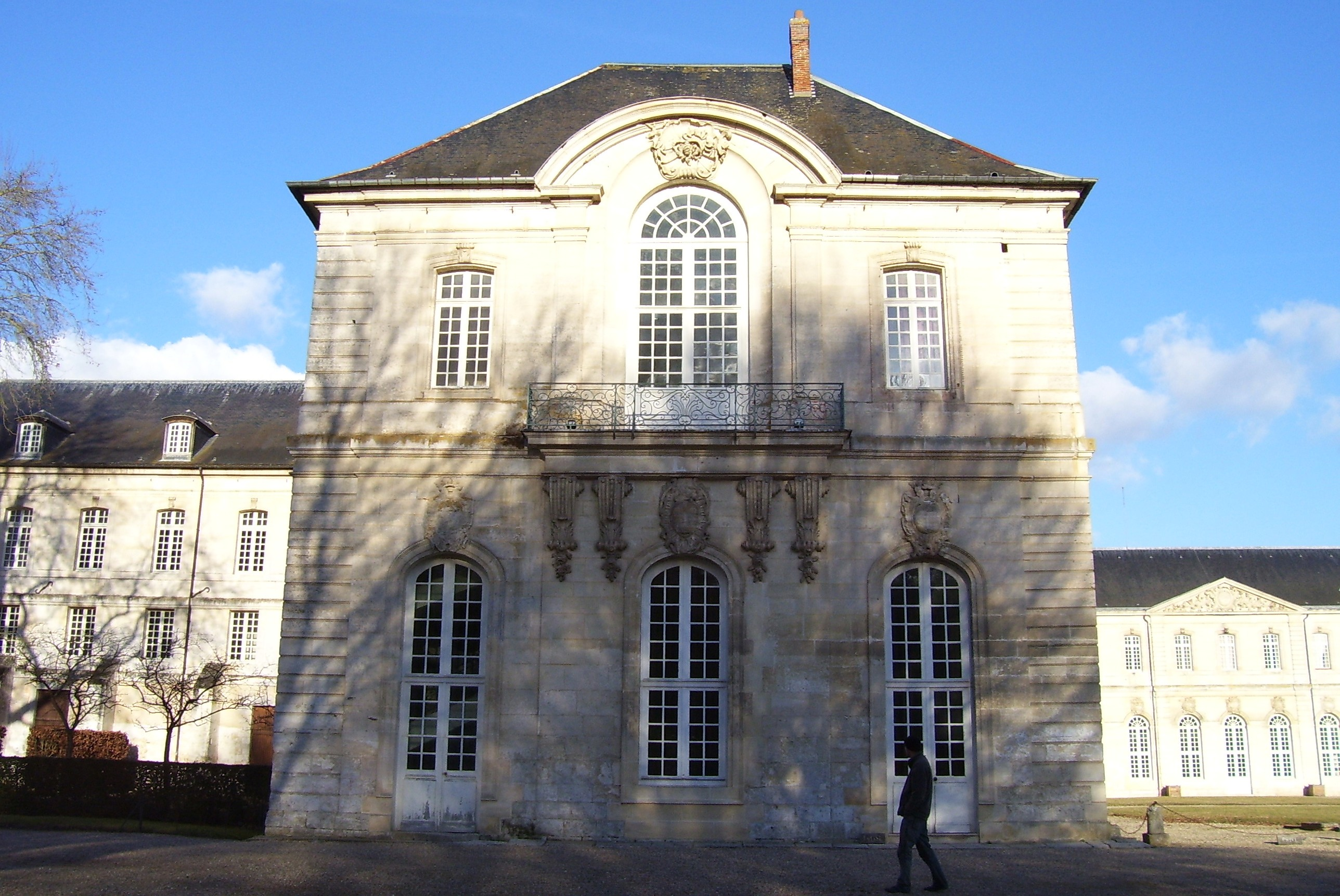
Abbey church

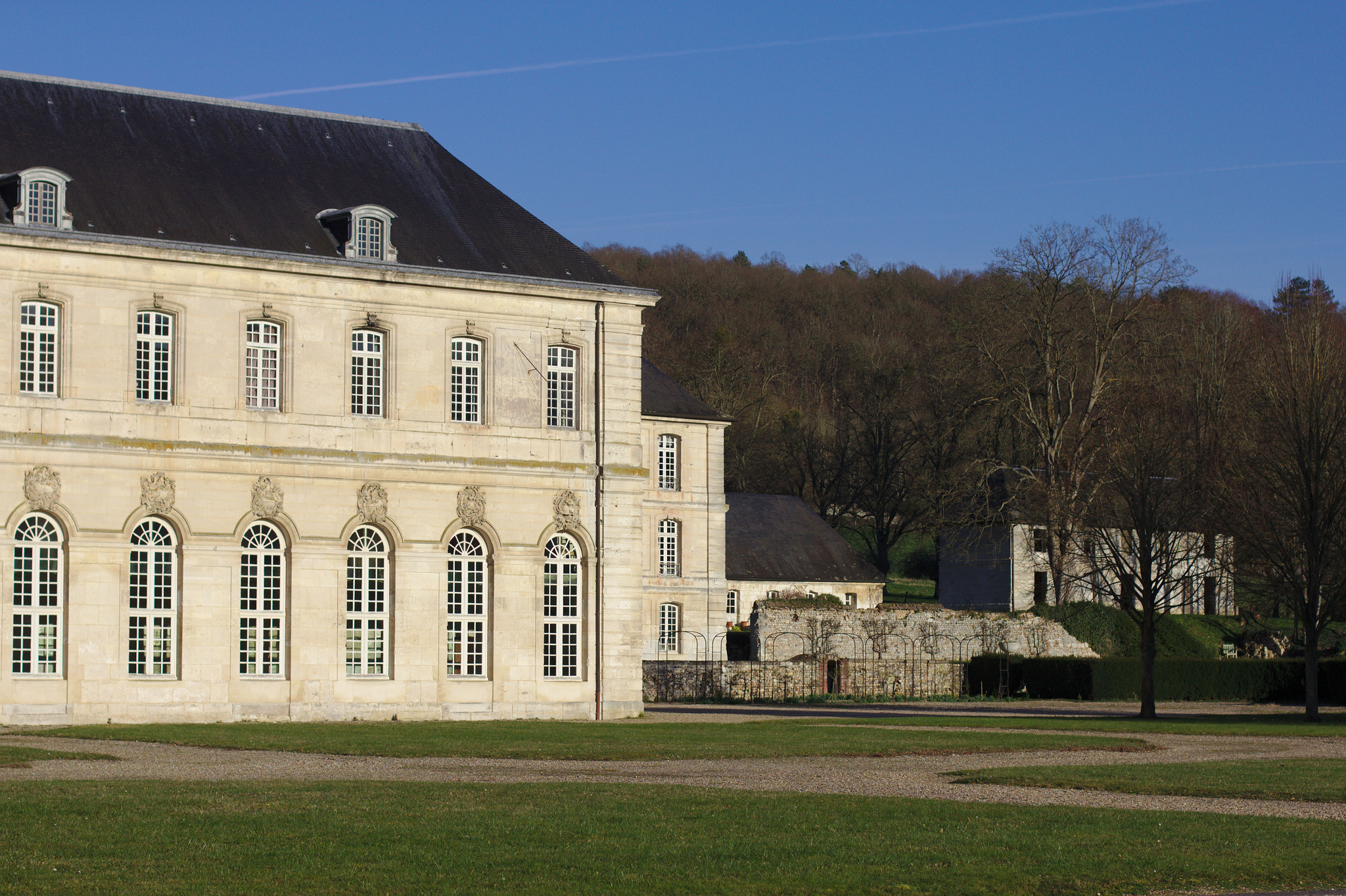
Residential building

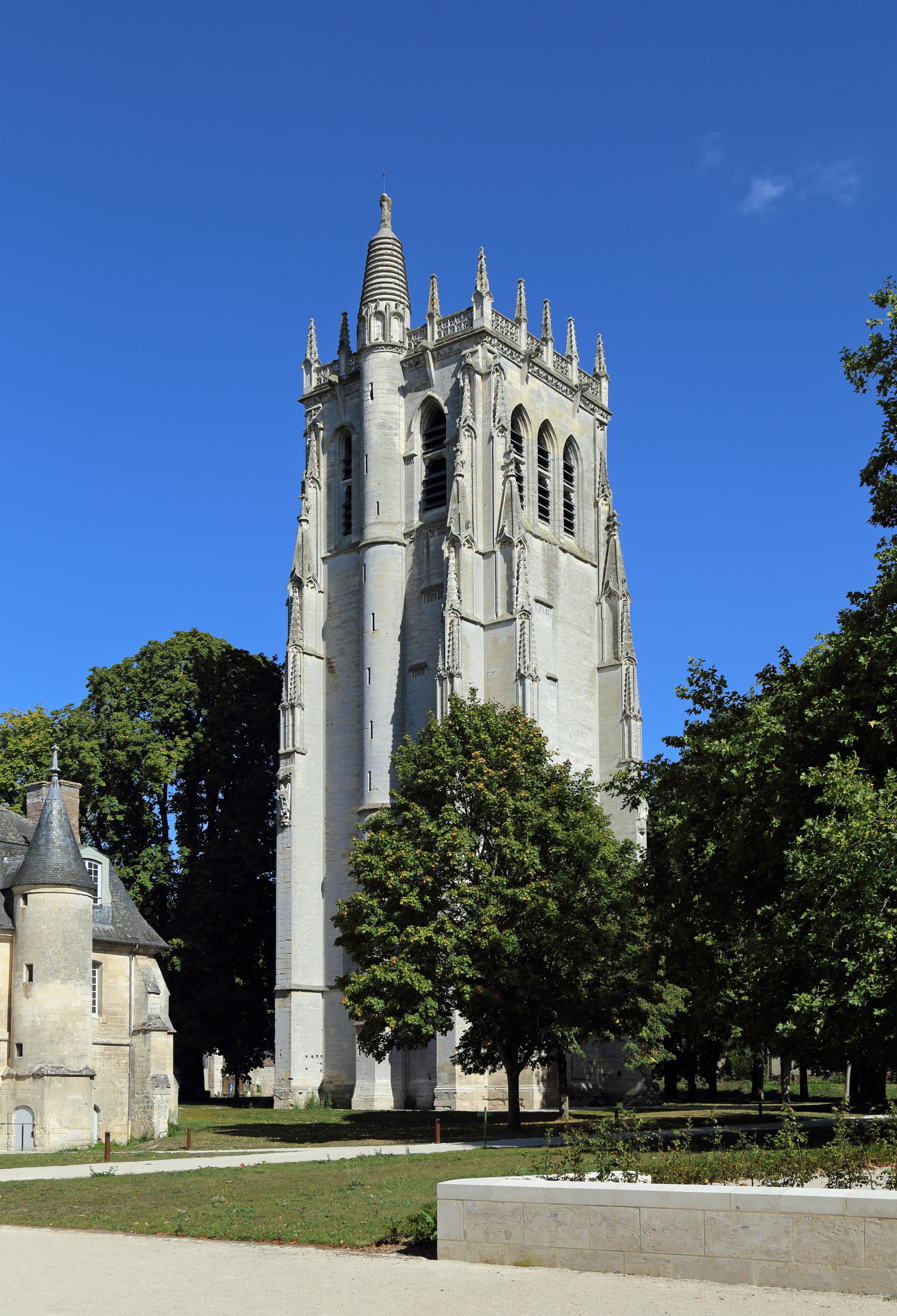
Tour Saint-Nicolas

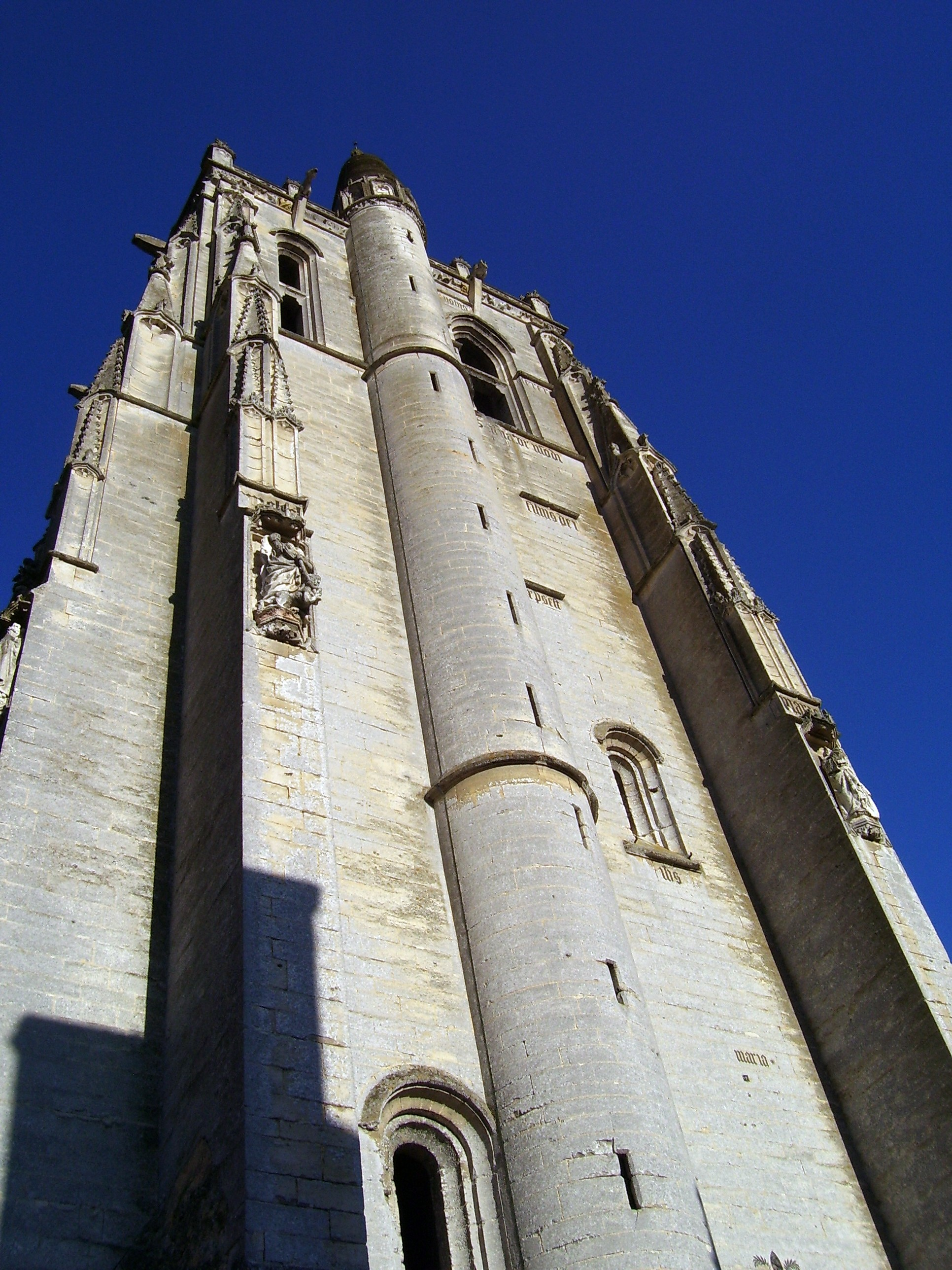
Close-up of the Tour Saint-Nicolas

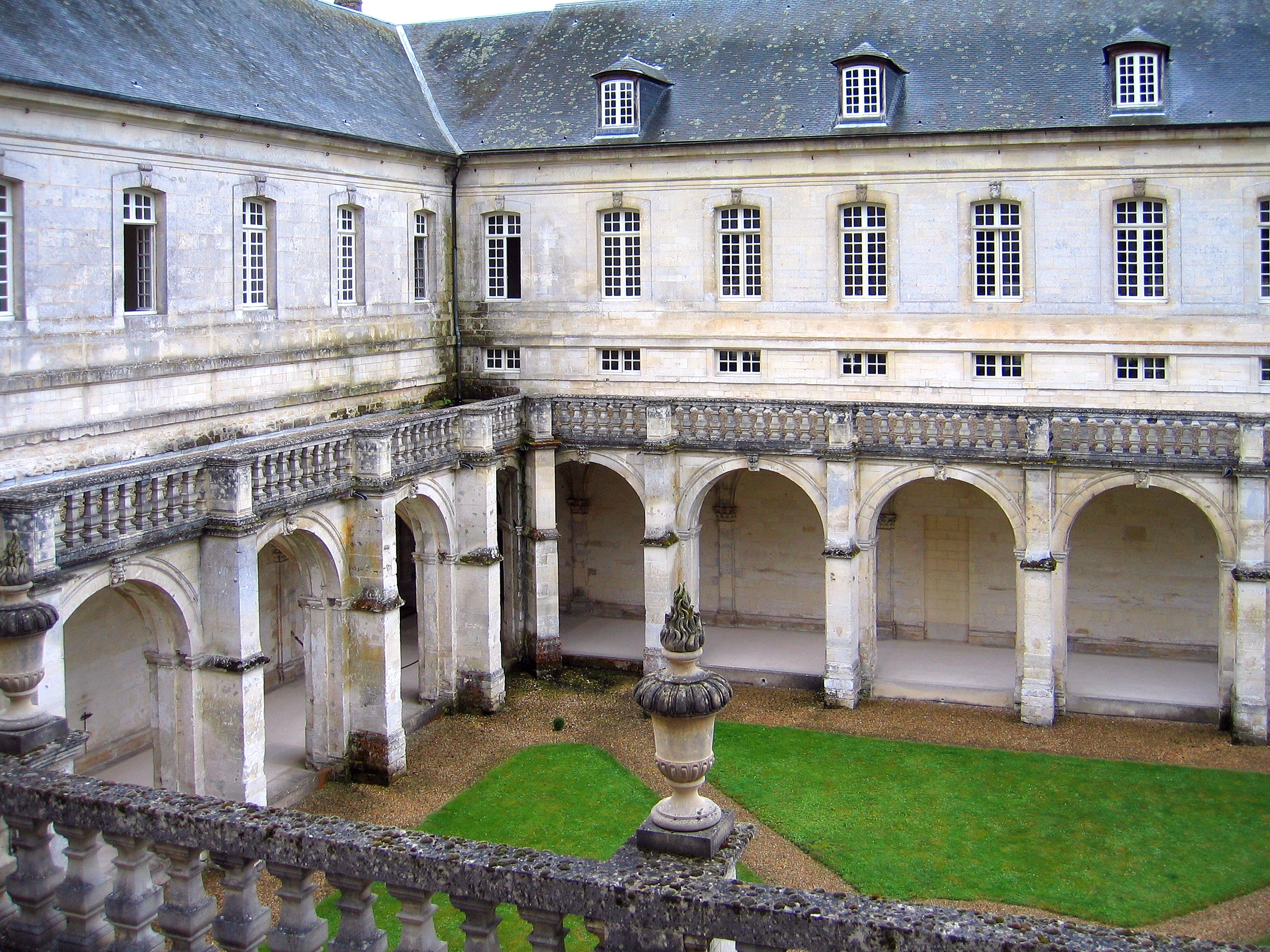
Cloister

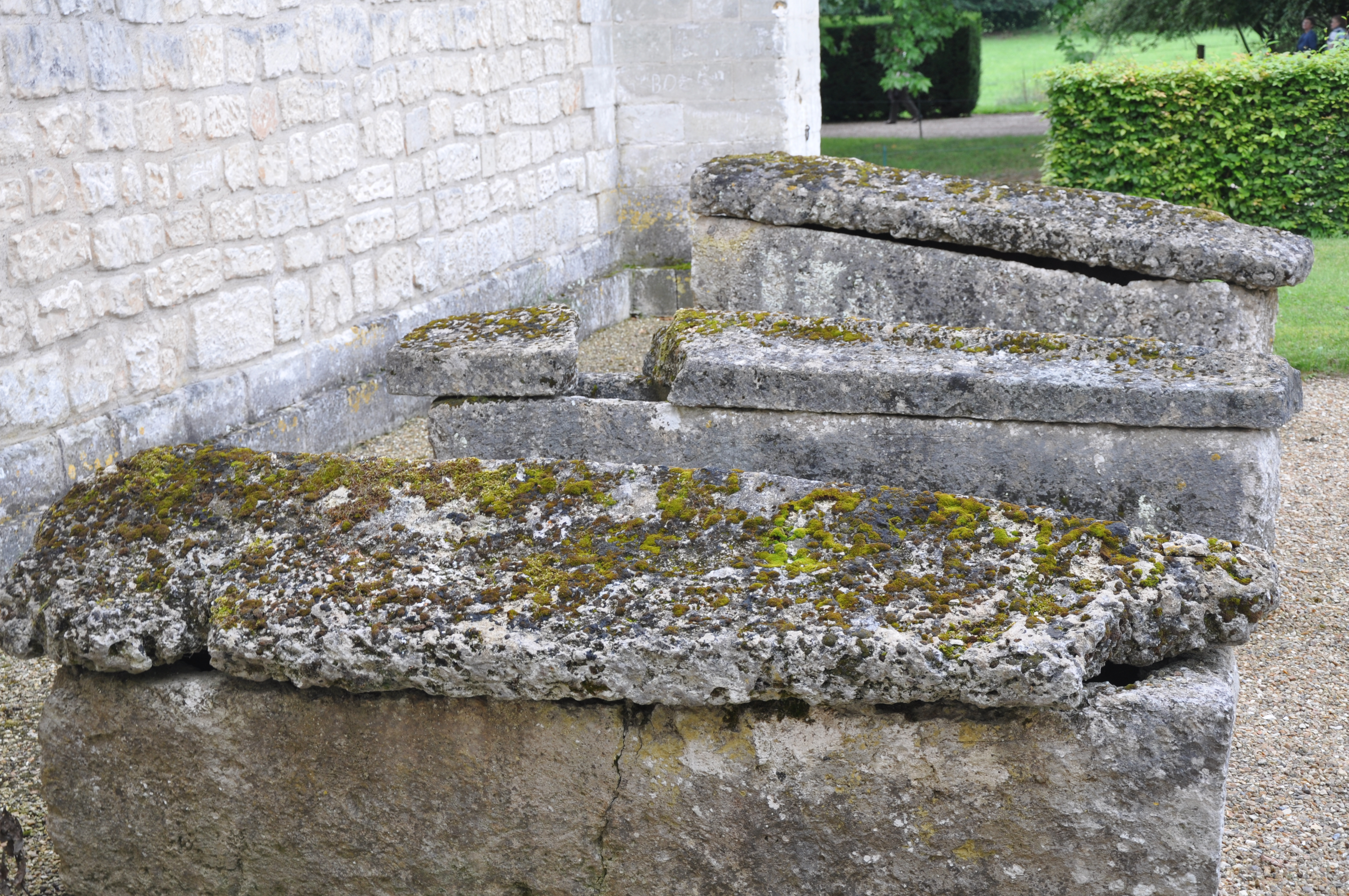
Sarcophagi in the park of the abbey

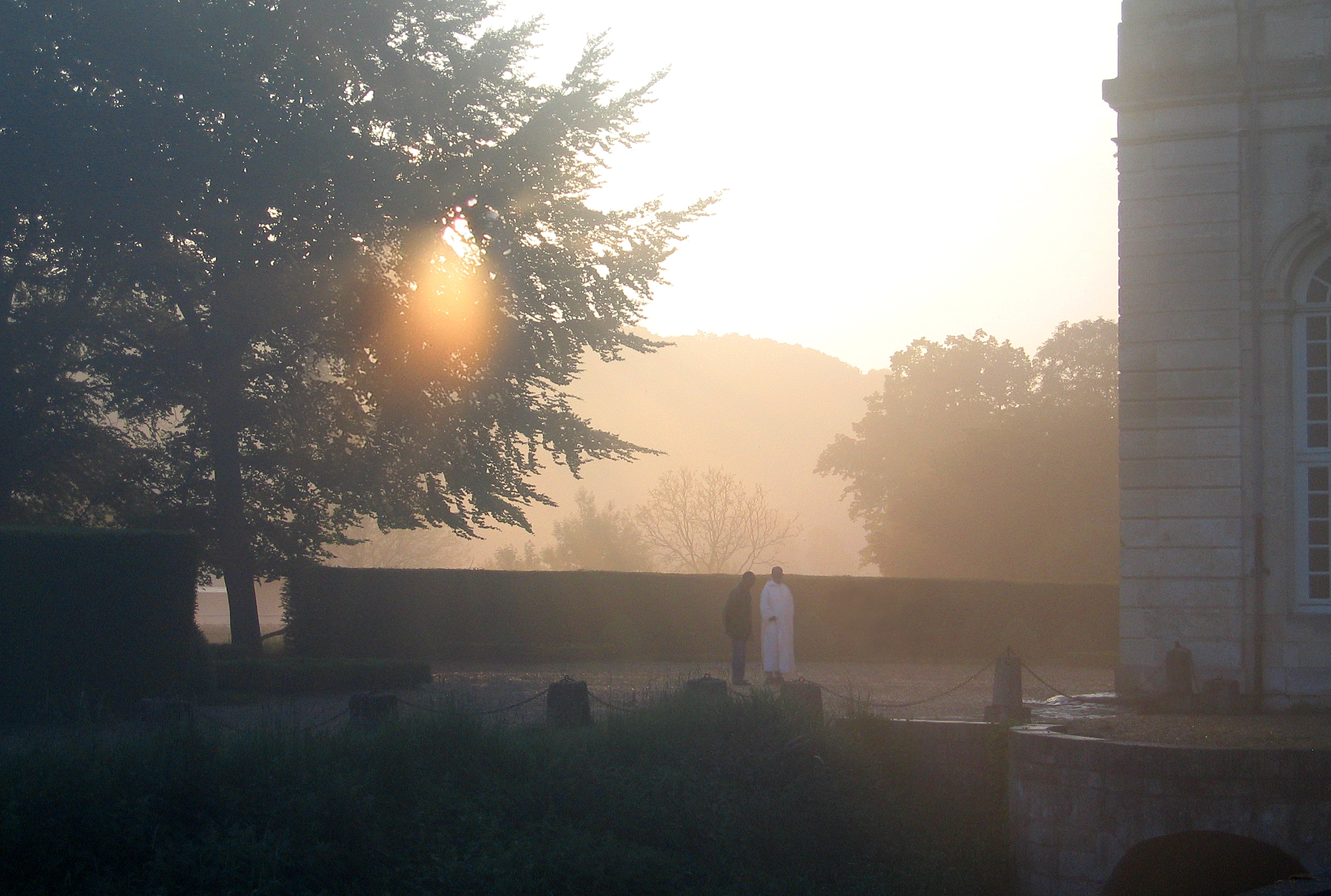
Morning in the abbey grounds

== List of abbots ==
The following is a list of the abbots:

- 1034–1078: Herluin (or Hellouin)
- 1078–1093: Anselm (afterwards archbishop of Canterbury)
- 1093–1124: Guillaume de Montfort-sur-Risle
- 1124–1136: Boson of Bec
- 1136–1138: Theobald (afterwards archbishop of Canterbury)
- 1139–1149: Létard of Bec
- 1149–1179: Roger de Bailleul (elected archbishop of Canterbury, but declined the position)
- 1179–1187: Osbern
- 1187–1194: Roger II
- 1195–1197: Gauthier
- 1197–1198: Hugues de Cauquainvilliers
- 1198–1211: Guillaume Le Petit
- 1211–1223: Richard de Saint-Léger alias de Bellevue (afterwards bishop of Évreux)
- 1223–1247: Henri de Saint-Léger
- 1247–1265: Robert de Clairbec
- 1265–1272: Jean de Guineville
- 1272–1281: Pierre de la Cambe Pierre de la Cambe
- 1281–1304: Ymer de Saint-Ymer
- 1304–1327: Gilbert de Saint-Étienne
- 1327–1335: Geoffroy Faé (afterwards Bishop of Évreux)
- 1335–1351: Jean des Granges
- 1351–1361: Robert de Rotes alias Couraye
- 1361–1388: Guillaume de Beuzeville alias Popeline
- 1388–1391: Estout d'Estouteville
- 1391–1399: Geoffroy Harenc
- 1399–1418: Guillaume d'Auvillars
- 1418–1430: Robert Vallée
- 1430–1446: Thomas Frique
- 1446–1452: Jean de La Motte
- 1452–1476: Geoffroy d'Épaignes
- 1476–1484: Jean Boucard
- 1484–1491: Robert d'Évreux
- 1491–1515: Guillaume Guérin
- 1515–1515: Jean Ribault
- 1515–1520: Adrien Gouffier de Boissy (created cardinal in 1515, also bishop of Coutances and the administrator of the see of Albi)
- 1520–1533: Jean d'Orléans-Longueville (also archbishop of Toulouse and bishop of Orléans, created cardinal in 1533)
- 1534–1543: Jean Le Veneur (also Bishop of Lisieux)
- 1544–1557: Jacques d'Annebaut (created cardinal in 1544, also Bishop of Lisieux)
- 1558–1572: Louis de Lorraine (created cardinal in 1553, also successively bishop of Troyes, archbishop of Sens and bishop of Metz)
- 1572–1591: Claude de Lorraine
- 1591–1597: Emeric de Vic
- 1597–1661: Dominique de Vic (also archbishop of Auch)
- 1661–1664: vacant
- 1664–1707: Jacques-Nicolas Colbert (also archbishop of Rouen)
- 1707–1717: Roger de La Rochefoucauld
- 1717–1771: Louis de Bourbon-Condé
- 1771–1782: vacant
- 1782–1790: Yves-Alexandre de Marbeuf (also bishop of Autun, later archbishop of Lyon)
- 1790–1948: vacant
- 1948–1986: Paul Grammont
- 1988–1990: Philippe Aubin
- 1990–1996: Philibert Zobel
- 1996–2020: Paul-Emmanuel Clénet

== See also ==
- List of Benedictine monasteries in France
- St Werburgh's Abbey
- Povington Priory
- Tooting Bec
- Weedon Bec
