= Richard de Saint-Léger =

French cleric (d 1236)

Also known as Richard de Bellevue, Richard de Saint-Léger (born in Fécamp, parish of Saint-Léger, and died on April 4, 1236), was a 13th-century French clergyman, abbot of Bec and then bishop of Évreux.

== Biography ==
=== Abbot of Bec ===
Justicier du Bec, Richard was elected abbot on September 26, 1211, succeeding Guillaume II Le Petit. Presented before King Philippe Auguste, it was consecrated by Robert Poulain, Archbishop of Rouen.

He undertook the reconstruction of the abbey, partially destroyed in 1195. Work began in 1215 under the direction of Enguerran, master builder of Rouen Cathedral. The construction slowed down, he was fired in mid 1216 and replaced by Gautier de Meulan, attested as Philippe Auguste's master builder. The work was completed at the end of 1217.

In 1219 he published statutes for the dependent priories of Bec.

A prior of Bec and relative of Richard, Henri de Saint-Léger, died June 1247, succeeded him as abbott.

=== Bishop of Évreux ===
Elected bishop of Évreux on July 17, 1223, he was consecrated and inaugurated by Thibaut d'Amiens, archbishop of Rouen.

He attended the Council of Rouen the following year and consecrated Ascension Day with Gautier, Bishop of Chartres, the church of Saint-Martin de Broglie. In 1226 he dedicated the church of Notre-Dame de la Haye-le-Comte, then in 1227 that of La Noë.

In 1229, he subscribed to the charter for tithes and the construction of a new church in Les Essarts (Saint-Jacques church).

He was present at the meetings held by King Louis IX at Bernay. He agrees to the request, made by Richard de Tournebu to the king, to build a chapel in his castle of Aubevoie.

He died on April 4, 1236 and his body was brought to the Abbey of Saint-Taurin.
