= Jean des Granges =

Abbott of Bec Abbey, France (died 1351)

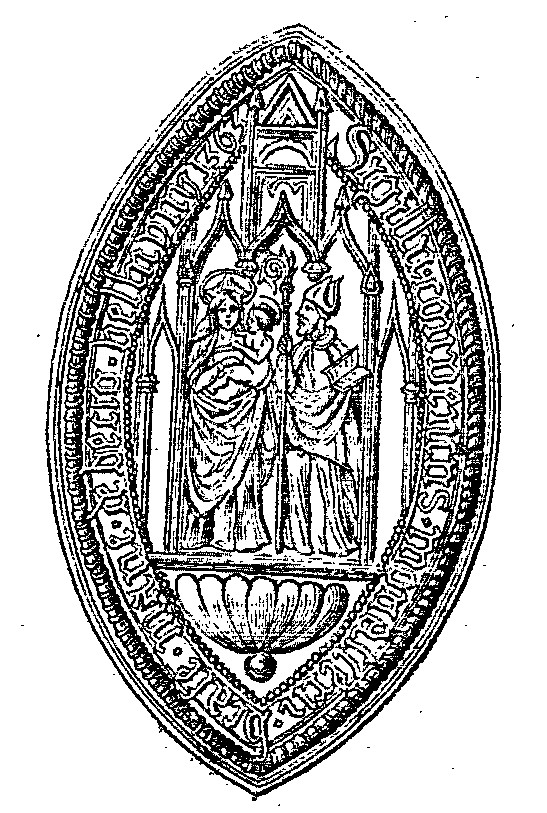
Seal of Bec Abbey:.

Jean II des Granges was Abbott of Bec Abbey in Northern France during the High Middle Ages.

Prior to being Abbott, he had been first justice of the Abbey, and was elected bishop on 23 June 1335. In his time as Abbott he oversaw the reconstructions in 1327.

He spent much of his time as Abbott in struggles with the king of France, Philip VI of France, who because of his fight against the English and the pope to resume the crusade, had imposed oppressive taxes on the abbey.

Jean des Granges died on 19 February 1351.
