= Jean de La Motte =

French abbot (died 1452)

Jean de La Motte was a 15th-century abbot of the Bec Abbey.

He was son of a bourgeois of Rouen, in Northern France. He earned a doctor decree from the University of Paris. He was first prior of Bec Abbey until he was promoted to be its abbot, a position he served between 1446 and 1452.

He died November 17, 1452, in Rouen.
