= Synod of Melfi (1089) =

The synod of Melfi was an ecclesiastical synod held in Melfi from 10 to 15 September 1089, convened by pope Urban II. Seventy bishops and twelve abbots attended and the synod dealt with various ecclesiastic topics connected to the reform movement as well the relation with the Greek part of the church.

== Background ==
The Norman conquest of southern Italy brought the former Catepanate of Italy under Latin control

At the beginning of his papacy, pope Urban II was facing an antipope backed by the German Emperor Henry IV and was therefore aiming to end this schism by convening Church councils. At the same time, though both Greeks and Latins were considered as part of the same church, relations between both sides were difficult, especially due to the Norman conquest of southern Italy which brought a predominantly Greek population under Latin rule.

== Synod ==
=== Attendance ===
The synod began on 10 September 1089 and was attended by seventy bishops and twelve abbots. Further, the Byzantine emperor also sent ambassadors as did the Norman duke of southern Italy, Roger Borsa, and his half-brother Bohemond of Taranto. The Norman delegation included duke Roger Borsa himself as well as the Benedictine Elias who invited Urban II to Bari in order to consecrate the crypt of the church being built for the relics of Saint Nicholas and consecrate Elias as the new archbishop.

=== Outcome ===
On one hand, the synod dealt with many church issues such as penance, age of ordination and similar issues. Though not a topic of the clerical reform movement, one canon among those dealing with the separation of the clergy from the laity forbade clergy wearing certain clothing that would be too decorative. It also aimed to prohibit simony and forbade the investing of priests or monks as bishops or abbots by lay people. Further, Urban II settled territorial disputes, as such confirming, for instance, the monastery of Saint Benedict in Taranto among the possessions of the abbey of Cava and appointed Guitmund to the see of Aversa. Finally, the synod promulgated the Truce of God in the southern Italy.

The second important focus of the synod was the relation with the Greek part of the Church. The concerns of pope Urban II was not only restricted to the Greek clergy that lived now in the areas the Normans had conquered, he was also eager to restore relations with the church of Constantinople and restore greater unity in the Christian church. As such, the synod dealt with the choice of the legitimate bishop of Reggio. The monk Basil had been installed and consecrated in Constantinople by patriarch Cosmas I. a couple of years prior, but had been not permitted (probably by the Norman Robert Guiscard) to take office in Reggio. At the synod, Basil agitated for his reinstallation, but he clashed with pope Urban II who referred to ancient canons according to which only the bishop of Rome was competent to consecrate other Italian bishops. As Basil contested this and refused to submit to the pope, another person, Rangerius of Marmoutier, was chosen as archbishop of Reggio, with the Greek metropolitans of Santa Severina and Rossano acknowledging the papal claim. During the synod pope Urban II also lifted the excommunication against Alexios I.

Also, Urban II invested Roger Borsa as Norman duke of southern Italy, though Roger had de facto been ruler for eighteen months.

== Sources ==
- Hamilton, Sarah (12 August 2015). Church and People in the Medieval West, 900-1200. Routledge. ISBN 978-1-317-32532-1.
- Herde, Peter (1 January 2002). "The Papacy and the Greek Church in Southern Italy". In Loud, Graham A.; Metcalfe, Alex (eds.). The Society of Norman Italy. Brill. ISBN 978-90-04-12541-4.
- Loud, G. A. (20 December 2007). The Latin Church in Norman Italy. Cambridge University Press. ISBN 978-1-107-32000-0.
- Loud, G. A. (2021). The Social World of the Abbey of Cava, C. 1020-1300. Boydell & Brewer. ISBN 978-1-78327-632-5.
- Moosa, Matti (2008). The Crusades: Conflict Between Christendom and Islam. Gorgias Press. ISBN 978-1-59333-366-9.
- Somerville, Robert (22 November 2016). "CHAOS TO ORDER: CLERMONT, 1095 TO LATERAN IV, 1215". Innocent III and his time: from absolute papal monarchy to the Fourth Lateran Council (PDF). pp. 269–283.
- Somerville, Robert (1996). Pope Urban II, The Collectio Britannica, and the Council of Melfi ( 1089) (PDF). Oxford: Clarendon Press.
- Vaillancourt, Mark G. (2009). On the Body and Blood of the Lord; On the Truth of the Body and Blood of Christ in the Eucharist. CUA Press. ISBN 978-0-8132-1678-2.
- Vernon, Clare (26 January 2023). From Byzantine to Norman Italy: Mediterranean Art and Architecture in Medieval Bari. Bloomsbury Publishing. ISBN 978-0-7556-3575-7.
- Wiedemann, Benedict (2022). Papal Overlordship and European Princes, 1000-1270. Oxford University Press. ISBN 978-0-19-285503-9.
