= Guillaume d'Auvillars =

French abbot (died 1418)

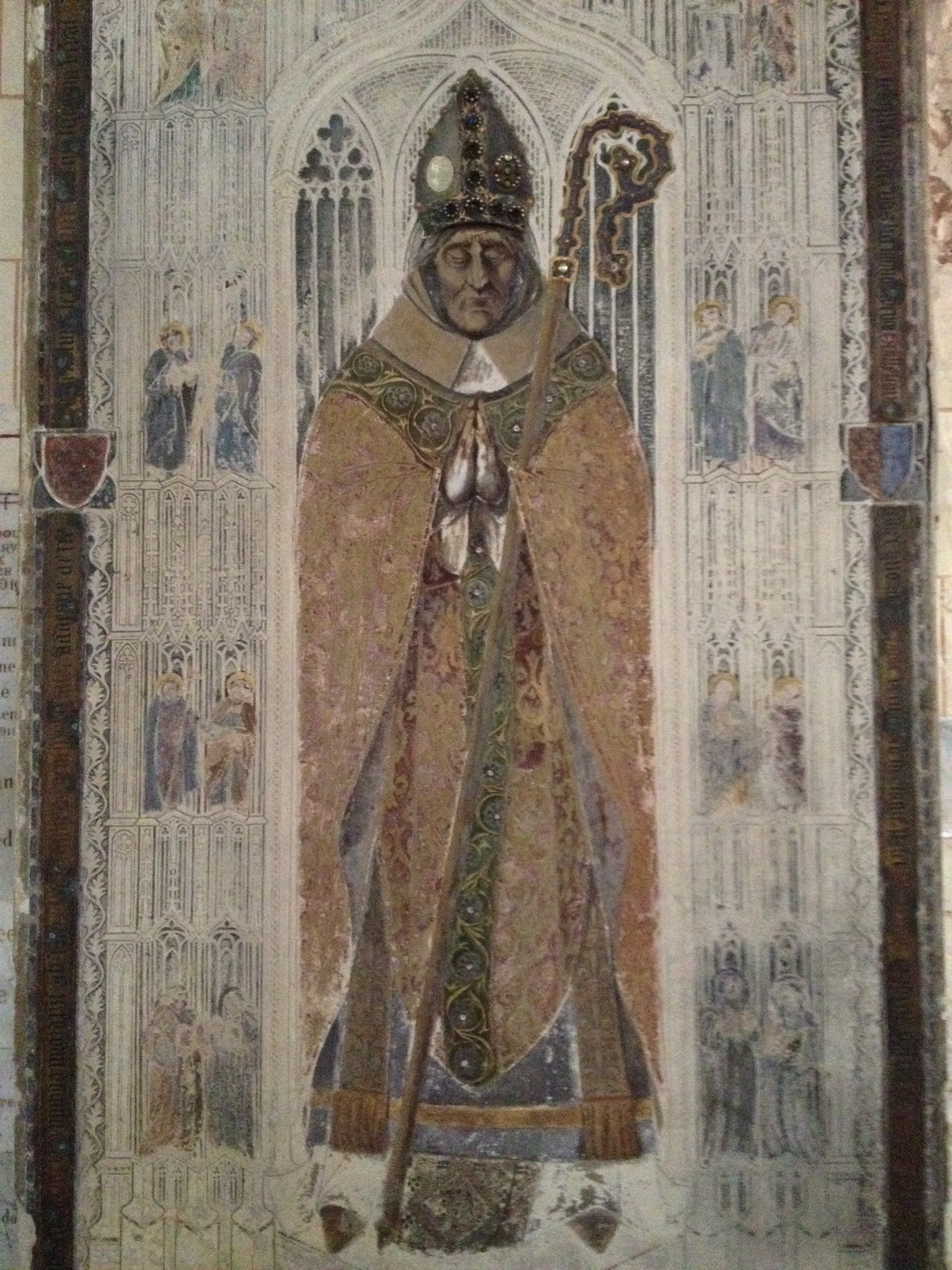
Détail de la dalle funéraire de Guillaume IV d'Auvillars.

Guillaume IV d'Auvillars, (died 3 January 1418) was the 26th abbot of Bec Abbey in France.

== Biography ==
Guillaume was born in the village of Auvillars in Normandy.

He was consecrated Abbot of Bec in 1399 by Guillaume de Vienne, Archbishop of Rouen. Following the king's order, he continued and completed the fortification of the abbey.

He died on 3 January 1418 and was buried in the middle of the choir of the abbey. His funerary slab, extracted during the Revolution, is now in the Sainte-Croix de Bernay church, which keeps it against the wall of the south transept. It was restored by Pierre-Victorien Lottin.
