= Le Bec-Hellouin =

- Commune
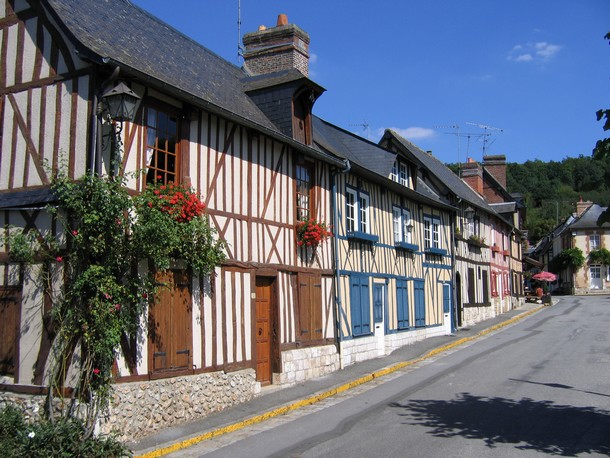
- Houses in Le Bec-Hellouin

- Coat of arms
- Location of Le Bec-Hellouin
- Location within France Location within Normandy
- Coordinates: 49°13′57″N 0°43′18″E
- Country: France
- Region: Normandy
- Department: Eure
- Arrondissement: Bernay
- Canton: Brionne
- Intercommunality: Bernay Terres de Normandie

Government
  - Mayor (2020–2026): Pascal Finet
- Area^{1}: 9.55 km^{2} (3.69 sq mi)
- Highest elevation: 141 m (463 ft)
- Lowest elevation: 46 m (151 ft)
- Population (2023): 366
  - Density: 38.3/km^{2} (99.3/sq mi)
- Time zone: UTC+01:00 (CET)
  - Summer (DST): UTC+02:00 (CEST)
- INSEE/Postal code: 27052 /27800
- ^{1} French Land Register data, which excludes lakes, ponds, glaciers > 1 km^{2} (0.386 sq mi or 247 acres) and river estuaries.

Le Bec-Hellouin (French pronunciation: [lə bɛk ɛlwɛ̃]) is a commune in the department of Eure in the Normandy region in northern France.

It is best known for Bec Abbey and has recently been voted one of the "most beautiful villages of France". The current mayor is Pascal Finet who replaced Jean-Paul Vittecoq in 2014.

== Geography ==
The commune along with another 69 communes shares part of a 4,747 hectare, Natura 2000 conservation area, called Risle, Guiel, Charentonne.

== History ==
Bec Abbey was founded in 1034 by Herluin, who was a knight at the court of Brionne and a Benedictine. Near to the abbey, in the village, the church, dedicated to Saint-André, was built in 1039. The original church burned down in 1264. It was rebuilt but damaged during the Hundred Years' War (1417). The nave and the bell tower were reconstructed in the 18th century.

In 1791 the abbey was closed because of the French Revolution and the departing monks transferred many statues to the village church; even the tomb of Herluin was moved to the church in 1792. From 1792 to 1794 bells and valuable decorative objects were removed from the church and finally brought to Bernay.

The windows of the church were destroyed during the bombing of Le Bec-Hellouin on 13 August 1944, in the course of World War II. The new windows were made in 1959. The Benedictine monks returned in 1948 and the tomb of Herluin was moved back to the abbey in 1959.

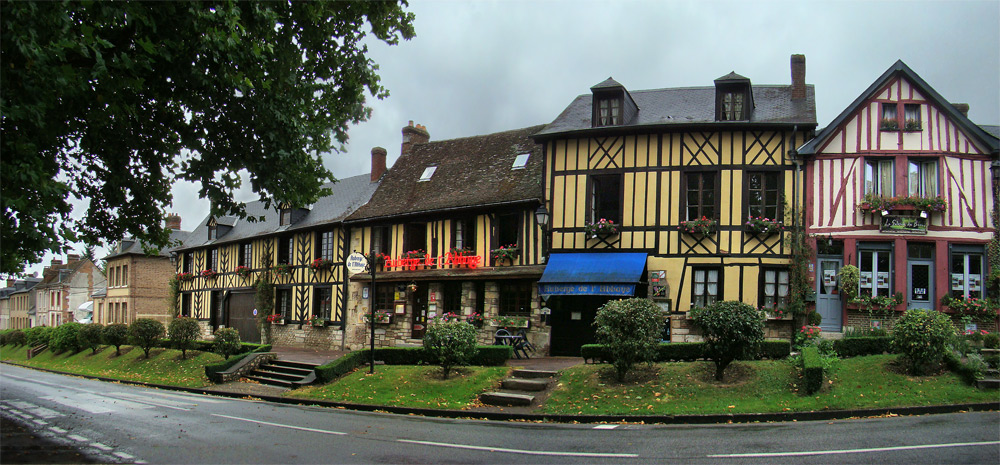

== Etymology ==
Known as Beccensis Ecclesia in 1041 and in Beccus Herlevini 1160. The village takes its name from the Scandinavian word for creek mouth (bekkr). While Hellouin refers to Blessed Herluin, founder of the nearby abbey. whose name is of Germanic origin.

== Notable people ==
Arnost, bishop of Rochester, England, 1076

== Landmarks ==
- Abbey of Bec-Hellouin.
- Monastery of Saint Francesca Romana
- St. Andrew's Church
- The village has a set of typical half-timbered houses, grouped around the Abbey Our Lady of Bec.
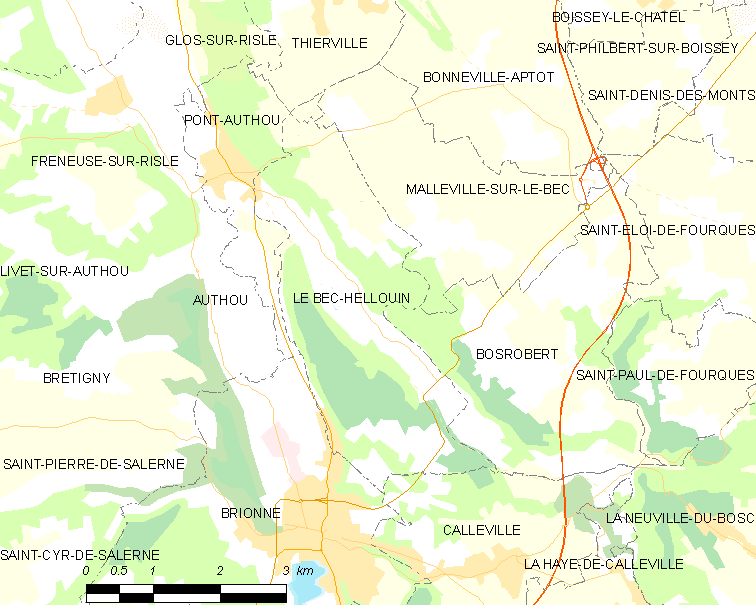
Map of Le Bec-Hellouin

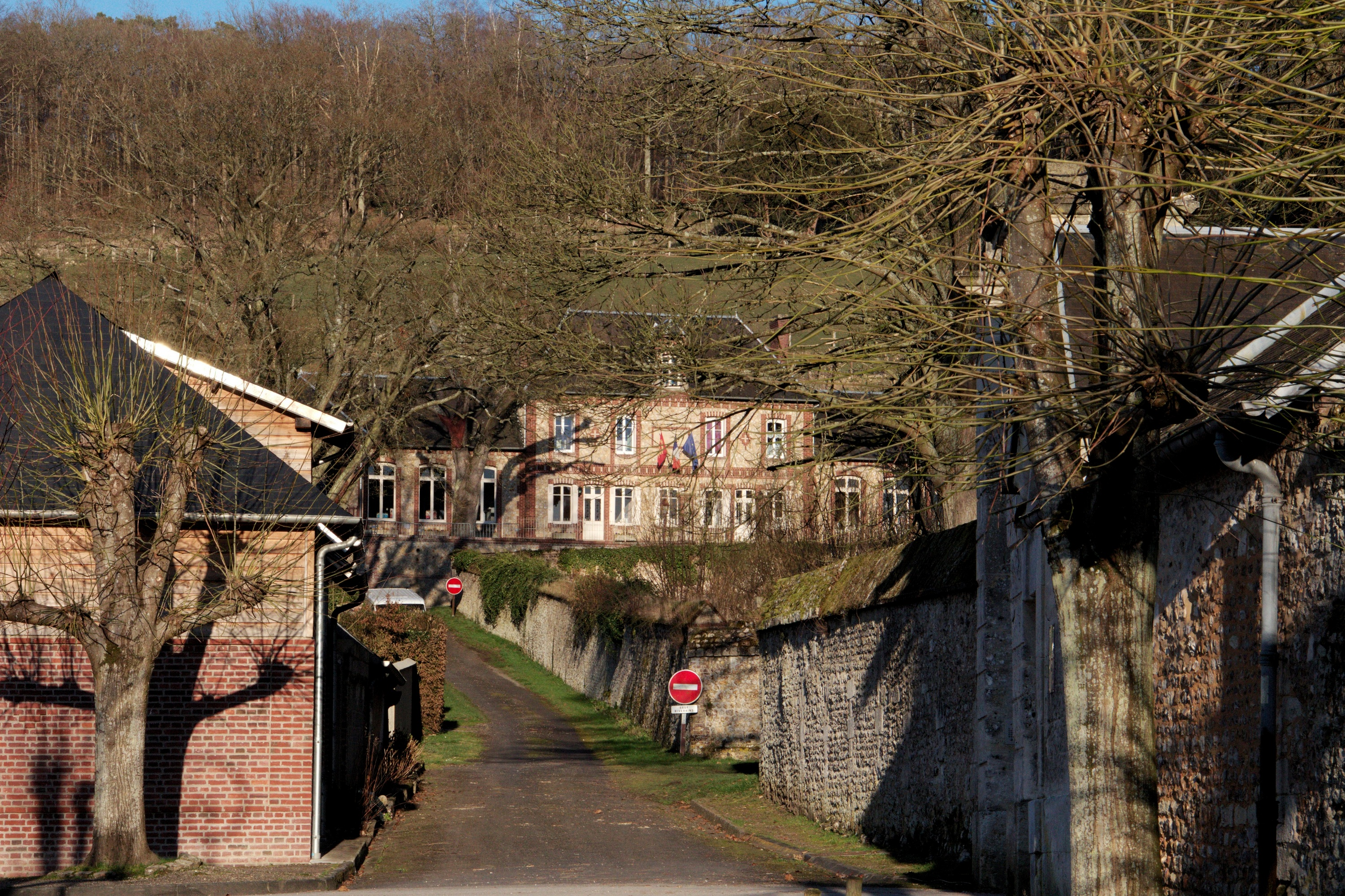
Town hall

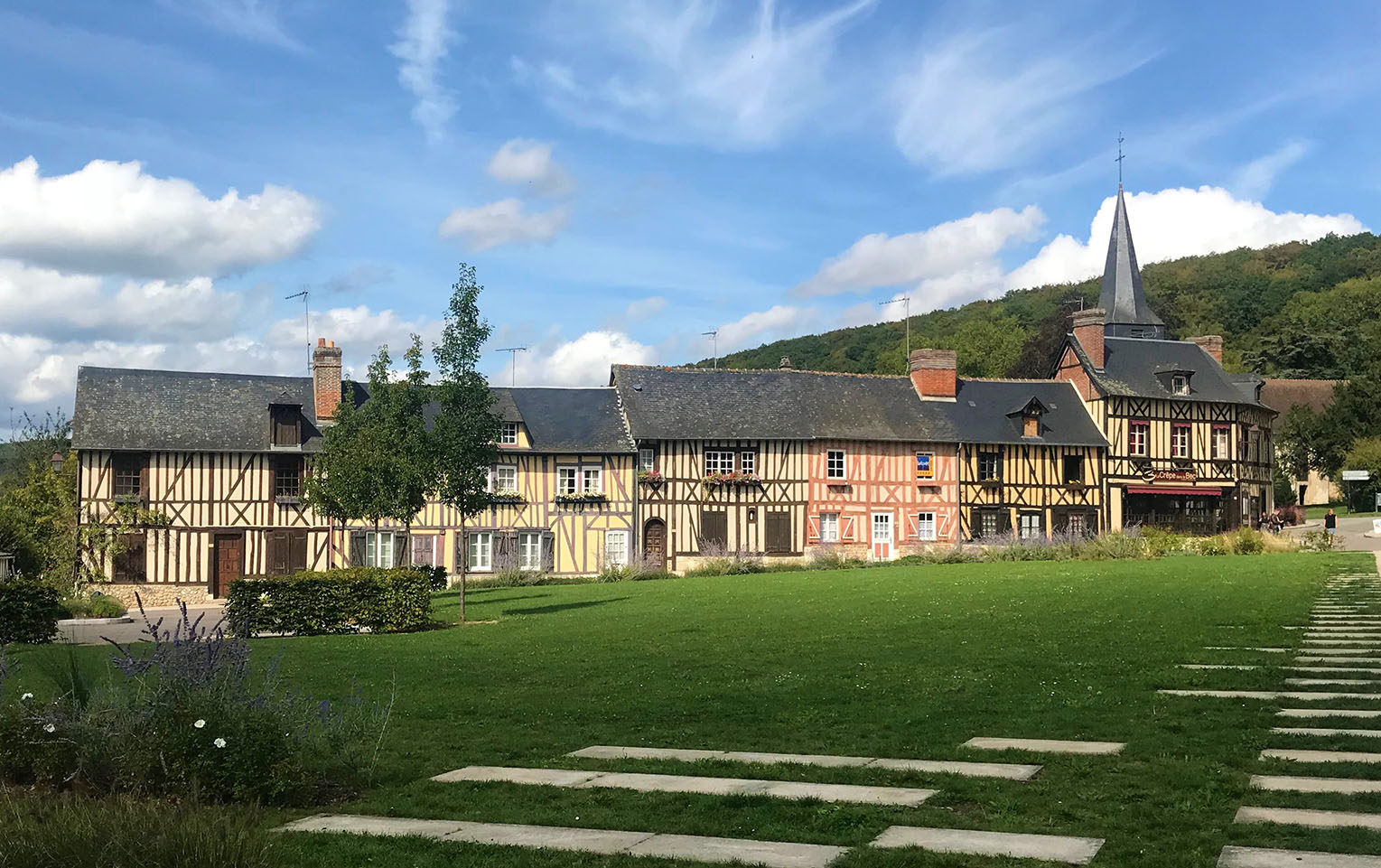
Rue du Quartier Burcy in the village of Le Bec-Hellouin

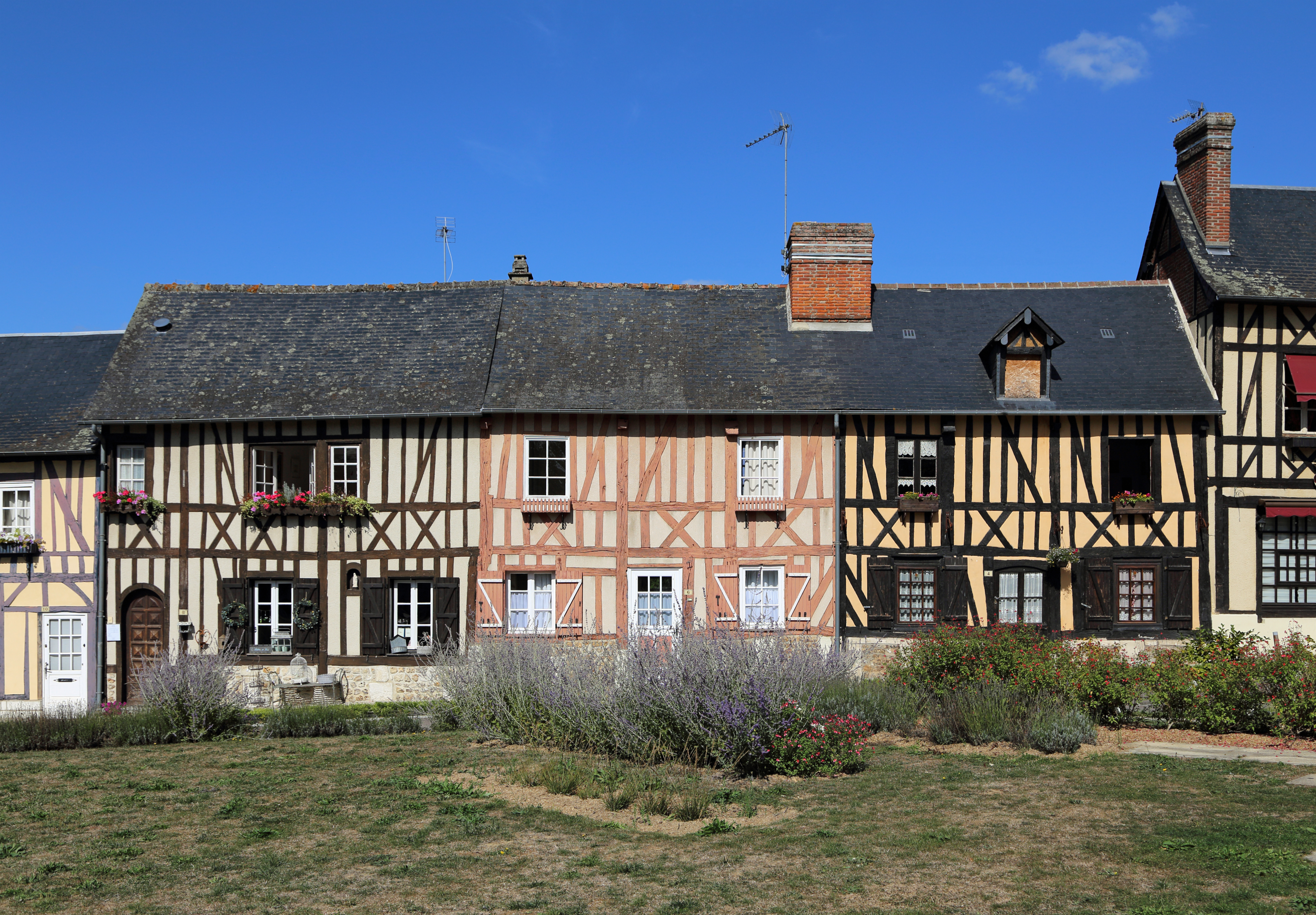
Half-timbered houses

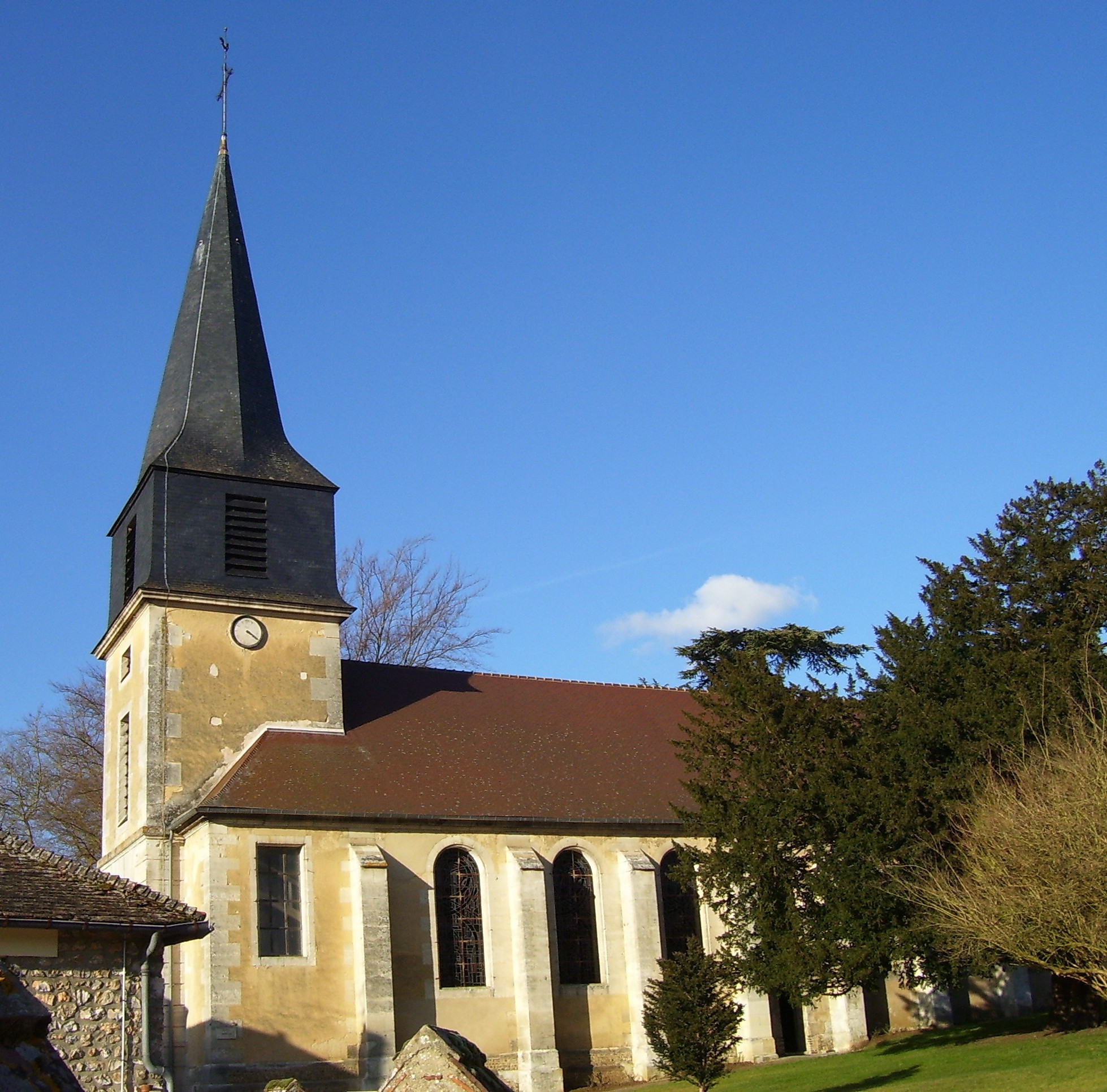
Church of St Andrews

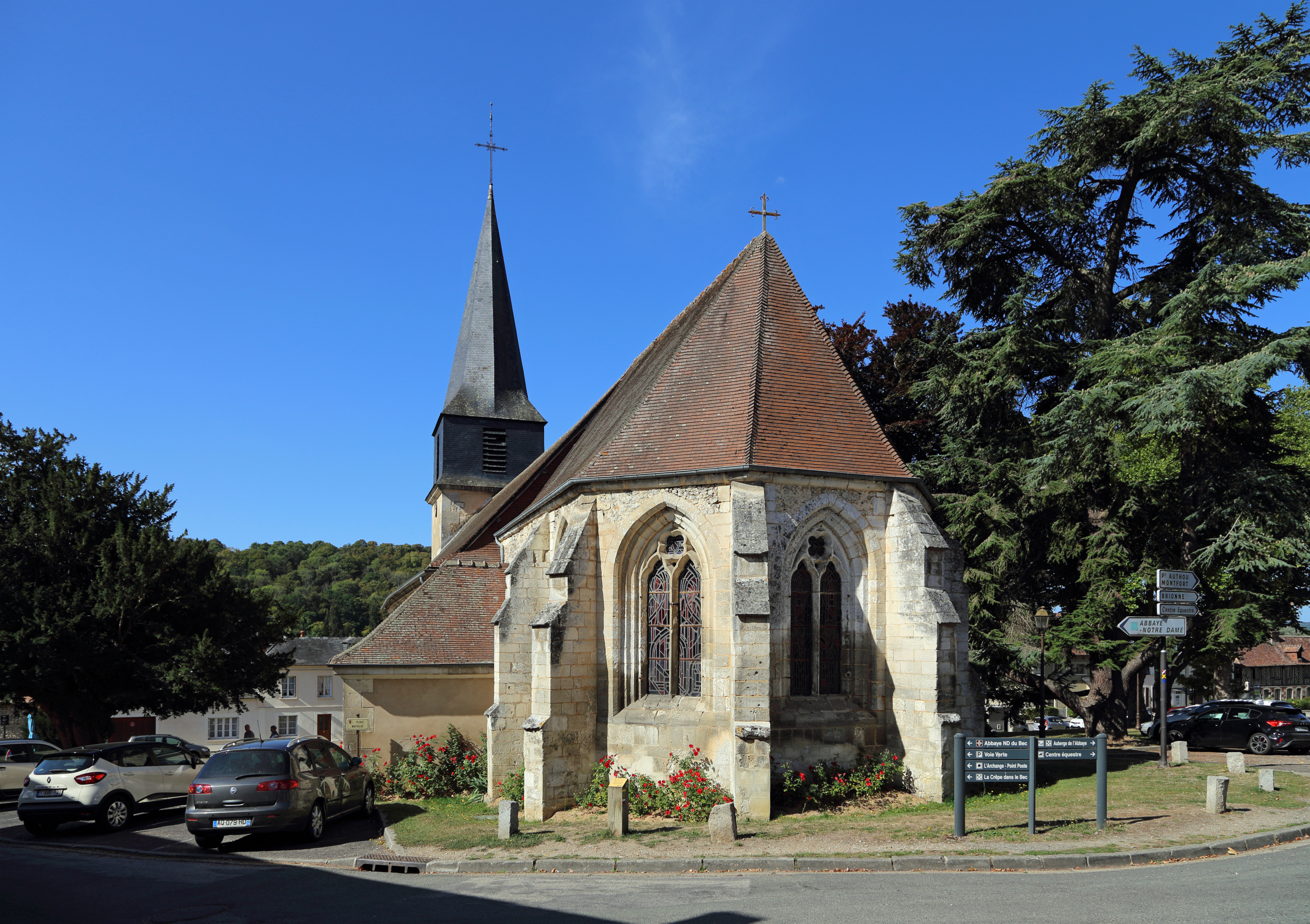
Church of St Andrews from the east

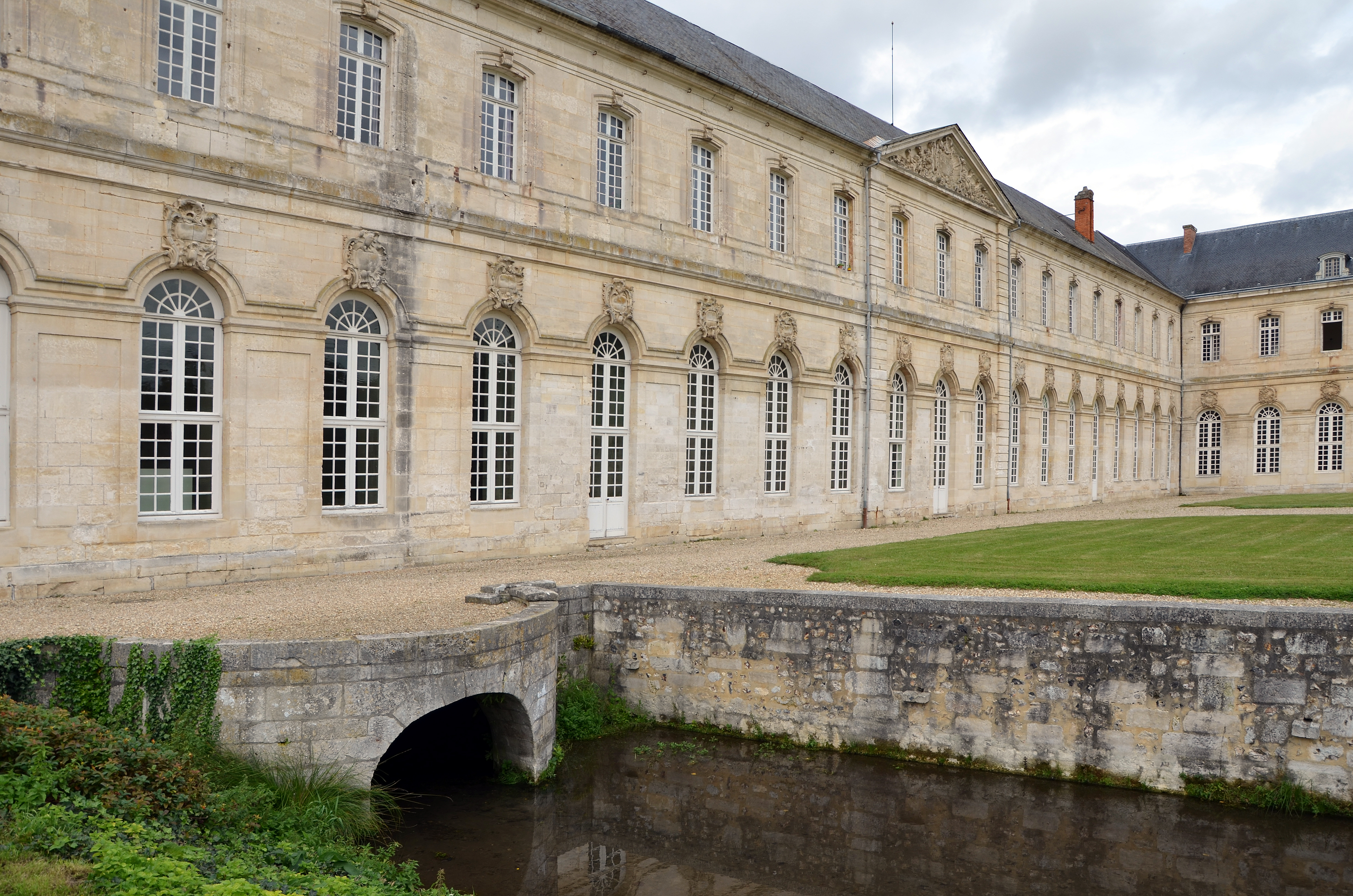
Church in abbaye Notre-Dame du Bec

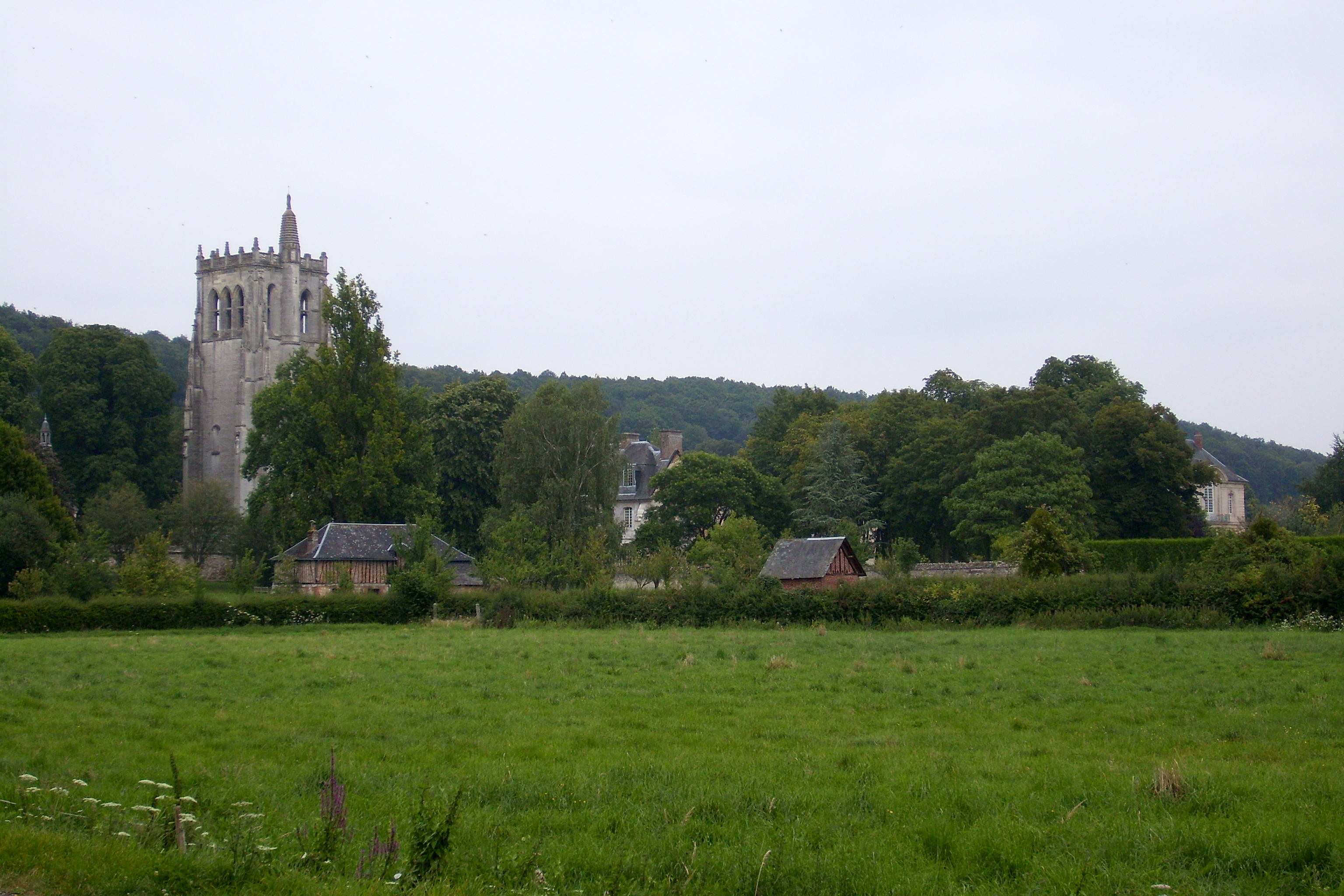
Bec Abbey

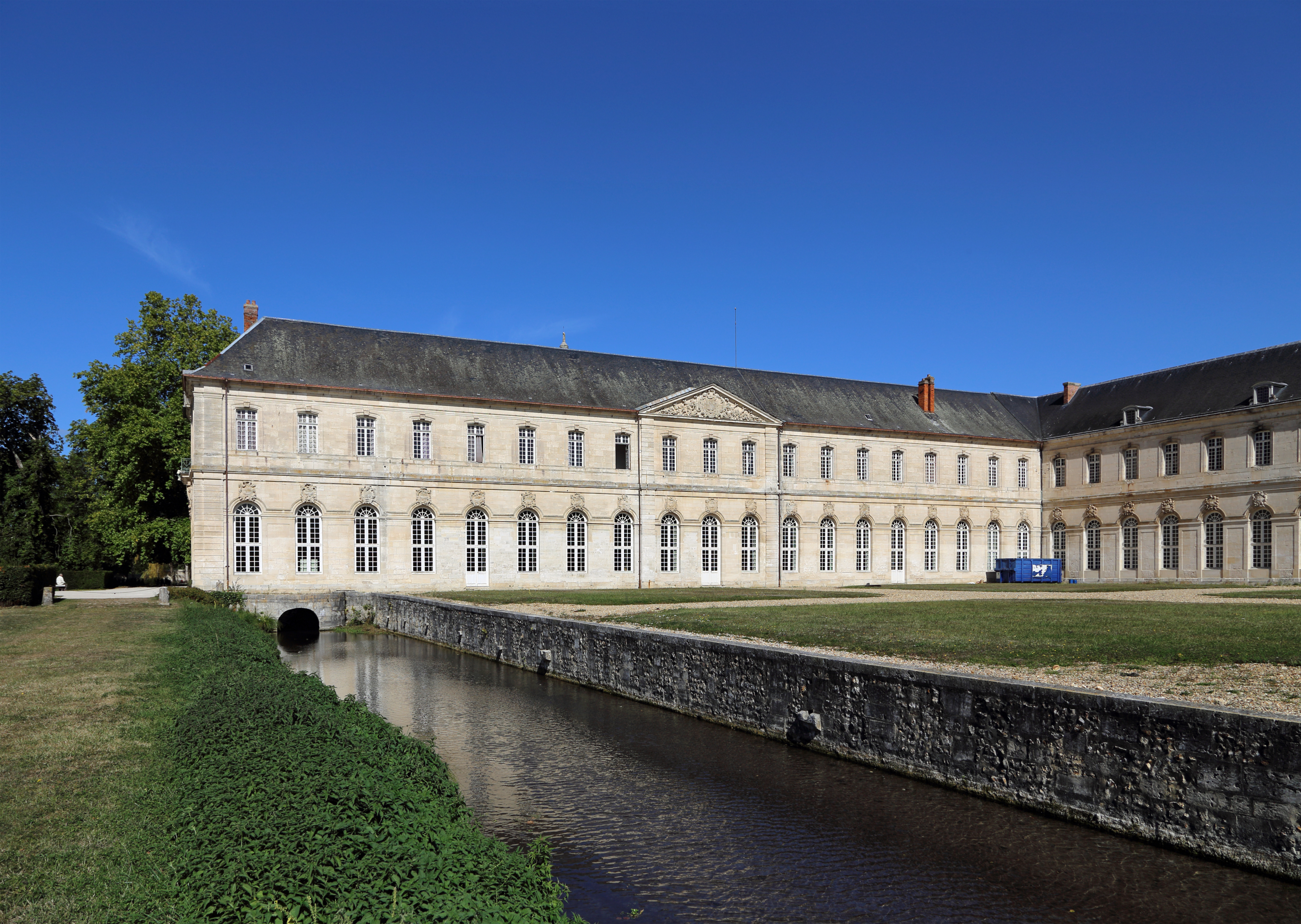
Bec Abbey

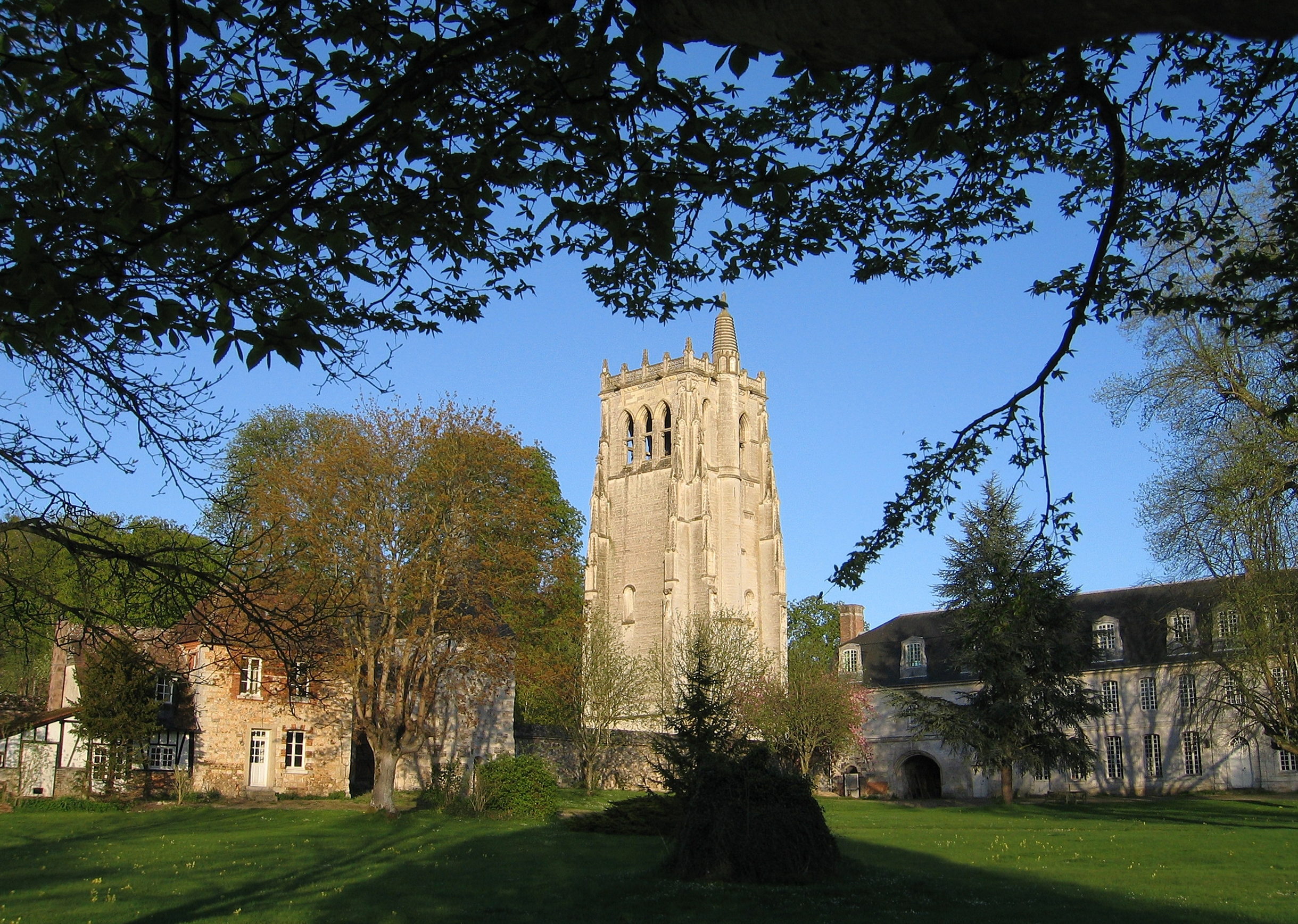
West side of the Tour Saint-Nicolas, between the ancient pottery to its left and the monks' residential building to its right

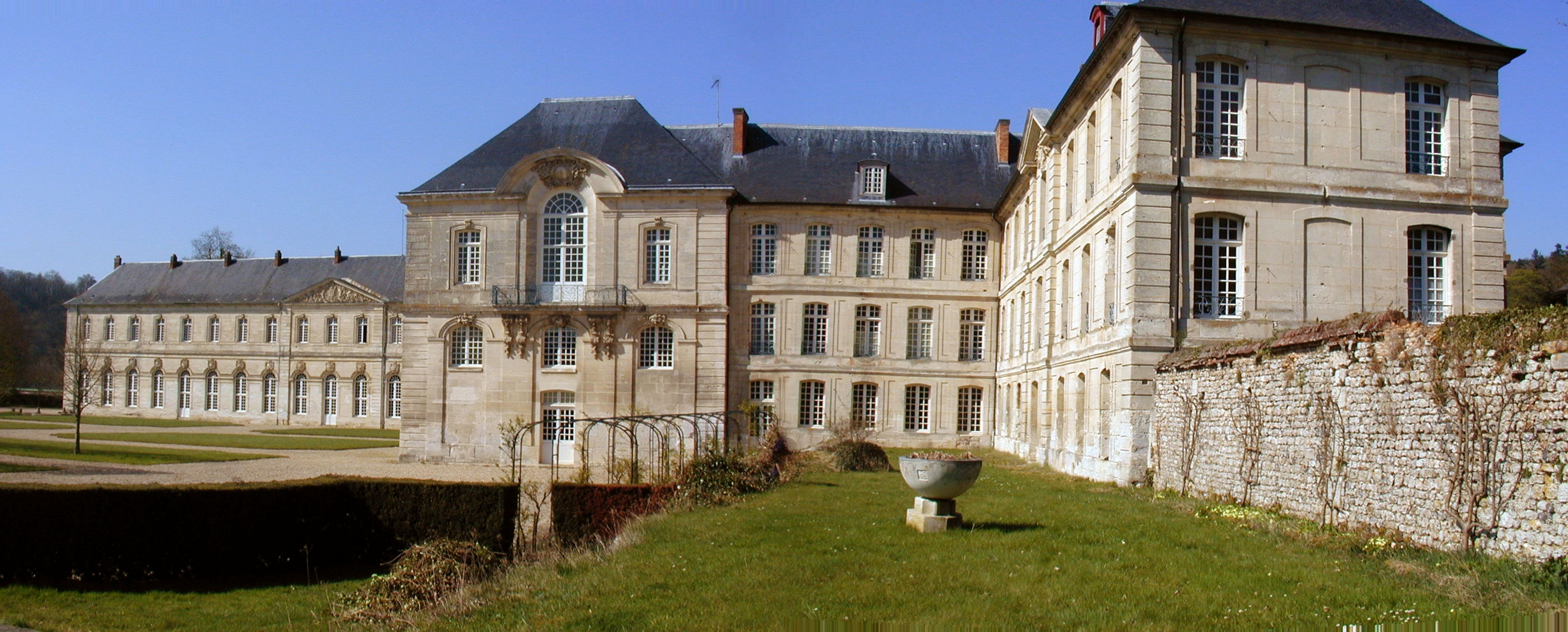
Southern façade of the abbey

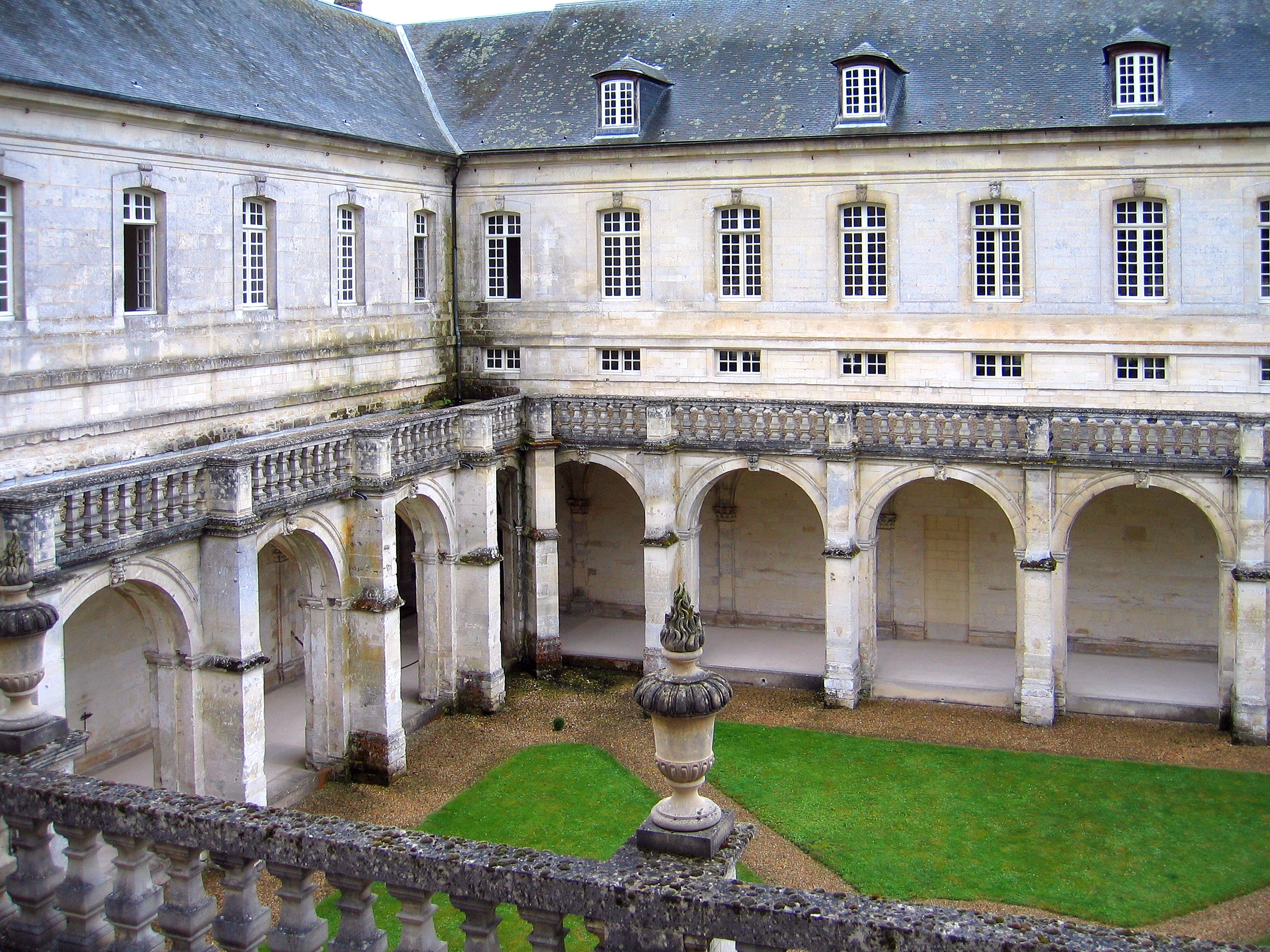
The cloister

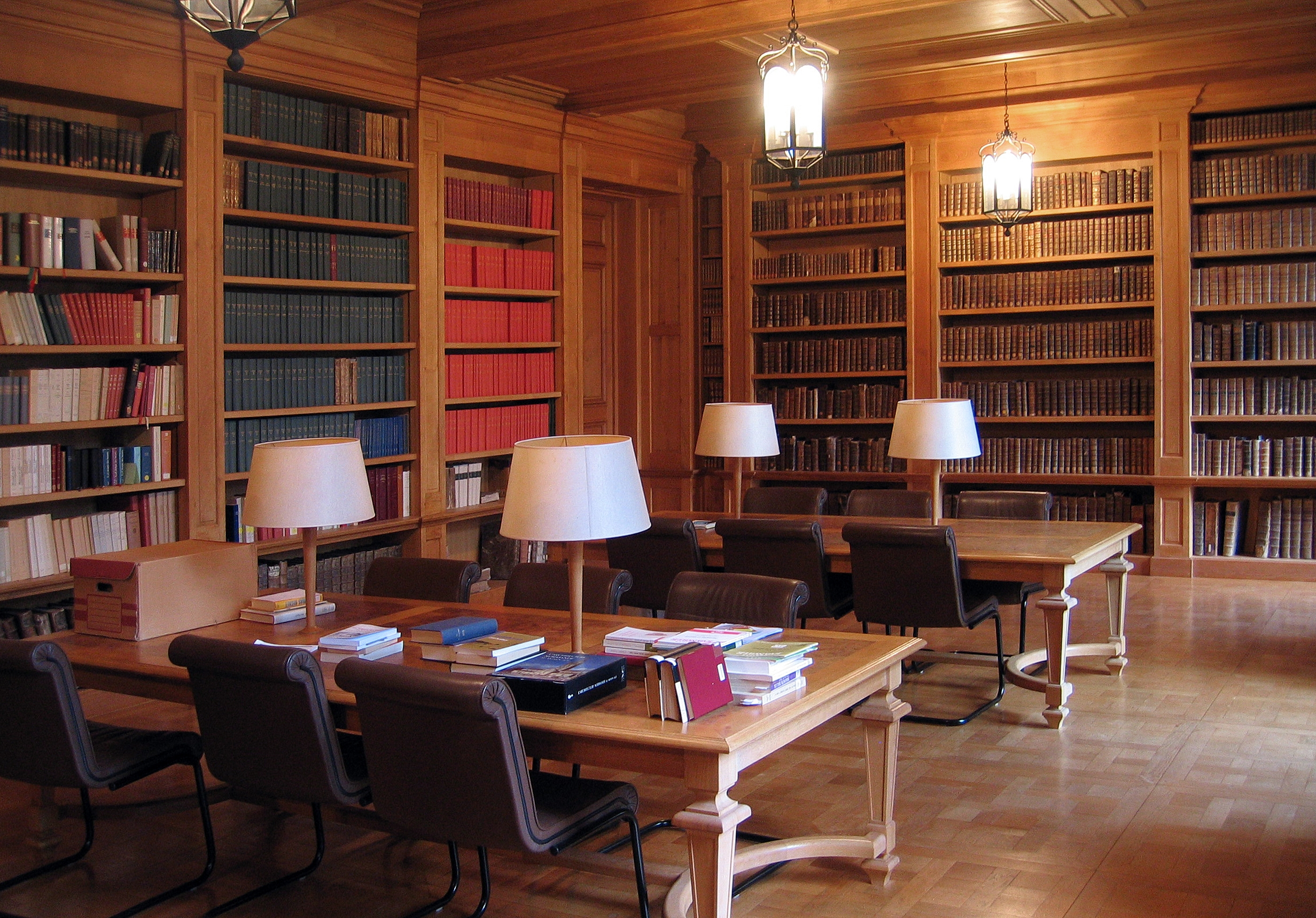
Bec Abbey Library

== Population ==
Historical population

Year	Pop.	±% p.a.
1793	710	—
1821	650	−0.31%
1846	640	−0.06%
1872	647	+0.04%
1901	490	−0.95%
1926	429	−0.53%
1946	338	−1.18%
1954	450	+3.64%
1962	465	+0.41%

Year	Pop.	±% p.a.
1968	566	+3.33%
1975	439	−3.56%
1982	470	+0.98%
1990	434	−0.99%
1999	406	−0.74%
2007	414	+0.24%
2012	420	+0.29%
2017	396	−1.17%
2023	366	−1.30%

Source: EHESS and INSEE (1968-2023)

== See also ==
- Communes of the Eure department
