= List of natural disasters in the United Kingdom =

This is a list of natural disasters in the United Kingdom.

Key to background colours
Geological event
Cold weather event
Hot weather event
High winds event
Wet weather event
Famine
Sickness epidemic

Year	Disaster event	Notes; disaster type, people killed, region affected, etc.
75,000–70,000 BP	Prolonged volcanic winter	Long lasting volcanic winters following the Toba catastrophe have been hypothesised to have killed every human not living in Africa at the time.
6100 BC	Tsunami	Caused by the Storegga Slide, struck east Scotland with 70-foot (21 m) wave after undersea landslip off Norway.
535–536	Severe cooling	The most severe cooling in the Northern Hemisphere in the last 2,000 years; likely caused crop failures and freezing for the Anglo-Saxons.
10th century	Regular heatwaves	Extended droughts with regularity: also through the period summers lasted half a year and were often warm or very warm – some notably extreme summers.
1014	Floods	Anglo-Saxon Chronicle: "And in this year on St Michael's Eve [28 September], that great sea-flood came widely throughout this country, and ran further inland than it ever did before, and drowned many settlements and a countless number of human beings."
1091	London tornado	Two deaths, the early London Bridge, 600 houses, many churches (inc. St Mary-le-Bow) demolished.
1235	Famine	England; 20,000 die in London alone.
1252–53	Both dry years and excessive heat	Considered by some (e.g. Brooks) as the driest pair of consecutive years known in the record. The summer (and possibly the spring in London/south) of 1252 was outstandingly dry/hot, with the ensuing drought ruining crops and many people died from the excessive heat. Spring/summer 1253 was also noted as dry/hot London/south.
1287	St. Lucia's flood	Not known by that name, the flood killed hundreds in England. This flood, along with the South England flood of February 1287, contributed to the decline of Dunwich as a major port.
1315–17	Great Famine	Throughout Europe.
1324	10 years of hot summers	Drought in summer (London/south). Possibly the start of 10 or so years of warm, often dry summers.
1348–1350s	Black Death	European pandemic of bubonic plague. The initial outbreak killed around 50% of the population.
1360s	Black Death	A later outbreak killed a further 20% of the population.
1485–1551	Sweating sickness	Sporadic outbreaks kill many thousands.
1540–41	Great heat and drought	Dry, in 1538–39. In 1540–41, the River Thames was so low that seawater extended above London Bridge. Reports at the time suggest that there were many deaths due to the 'ague', and 1540 is described in contemporary chronicles as the 'Big Sun Year'.
1580	Dover Straits earthquake	Estimated to have been 5.3–5.9 M_{L}. Two deaths in England.
1607	Bristol Channel floods	30 January 1607 (possible tsunami). Flooding in the Bristol Channel hit Carmarthenshire, Glamorgan, Monmouthshire, Devon, and Somerset.
1623–24	Famine	Said to be the last peace-time famine in England.
1638	The Great Thunderstorm	Widecombe-in-the-Moor, Devon, four killed and 60 injured.
1665	Great Plague of London	Bubonic plague killed an estimated 100,000 people, 20% of London's population.
1665	Derby plague	The bubonic plague spread north, but was stalled by the famous quarantine of Eyam.
1665–66	Long drought followed by a hot summer	Every month from November 1665 to September 1666 was dry. The climatological summer (June, July and August) of 1666 was amongst the top 10 or so of warm summers in the Central English Temperatures (CET) series (began 1659). CET also suggests that July 1666 had a mean value of 18 °C (64 °F), and August was 17 °C (63 °F). The heat and long drought added to a heightened risk of fire in populated areas. Lack of rain and hot temperatures helped spark the Great Fire of London (not itself classified as a natural disaster). As a result, this year saw an end to the Great Plague of London due to extreme heat and fire.
1690s	Famine	Known as the seven ill years, it occurred throughout Scotland, killing 15% of the population.
1697	Hertfordshire hailstorm	The most severe hailstorm ever documented in the UK, travelling 25 km from Hitchin (Hertfordshire) to Potton (Bedfordshire). At least one person was killed. Hailstones as large as bowling balls caused severe damage to homes.
1703	Great Storm	Up to 15,000 deaths, ships lost, mass damage to buildings and trees.
16th–18th centuries	Little Ice Age	Long-lasting period of lower-than-normal average temperatures throughout Europe.
1709	Great Frost	Extremely cold winter, temperatures as low as −12 °C (10 °F) on 5 January.
1729	Tornado	Bexhill-on-Sea struck by a waterspout that came ashore.
1755	Tsunami	Following the Lisbon earthquake, Cornwall was struck by a 10 ft (3.0 m) wave.
1770	Flooding and storms	In August throughout southern England. A flood was thought to have occurred in Lynmouth, Devon in 1769 and the date may have transposed to 1796.
1783	"Laki haze"	Sulphurous gas from an eruption in Iceland suffocates more than 10,000 in Britain, followed by about 8,000 deaths in winter.
1816	Year Without a Summer	Caused by the 1815 eruption of Mount Tambora. Crops devastated, unknown thousands die.
1831–50	Cholera pandemic	Part of the 1829–1851 cholera pandemic: beginning in London, 55,000 die in outbreaks across England and Wales.
1836	Lewes avalanche	Lewes, the only major avalanche recorded in England.
1840s	Highland Potato Famine	Starvation events caused by potato blight. Very few deaths, but 200,000 were said to have emigrated.
1848	Moray Firth fishing disaster	100 fishermen and 124 boats lost at sea during a storm in Scotland.
1852	Holmfirth Flood	Bilberry Reservoir embankment collapses, causing 81 deaths and a large amount of damage to property.
1859	Royal Charter Storm	Named for the ship Royal Charter, the storm, which lasted for two days, sank 133 ships, killing 800.
1864	Great Sheffield Flood	A flood that devastated parts of Sheffield on 11 March 1864, when a new reservoir was being filled for the first time. It killed at least 240 people.
1871	Great Gale	Occurring in the North Sea on 10 February 1871, it killed at least 50 people.
1879	Tay Bridge disaster	A European windstorm on 28 December 1879 caused the Tay Rail Bridge to collapse, killing between 60 and 75 people.
1881	Eyemouth disaster	189 fishermen died during a storm in Scotland.
1881	Blizzard of January 1881	Around 100 died in one of the most severe blizzards ever to hit the southern parts of the United Kingdom.
1884	Colchester earthquake	Several people killed and 1,200 buildings destroyed in Essex.
1894–95	Severe winter	Conditions were such that many people died of hypothermia or respiratory conditions.
1911	UK heatwave	Heatwave lasted from early July to mid-September. Newspapers ran deaths by heat columns.
1913	UK tornado outbreak	Series on tornados on 27 October, particularly in England and Wales. This day was the only known time in British history where two tornados exceeded F3 on the Fujita scale. One tornado in Edwardsville, Merthyr Tydfil, resulted in hundreds of injuries and six deaths and is the deadliest-known tornado to occur in the UK. The damage caused was around £100,000.
1918–19	Flu pandemic	Worldwide influenza pandemic nicknamed the Spanish flu.
1920	Louth flood	A severe flash flooding event in the Lincolnshire market town of Louth which caused 23 fatalities in 20 minutes.
1928	Thames flood	A disastrous flood of the River Thames in London. 14 drowned and thousands were made homeless.
1931	Dogger Bank earthquake	At 6.1 on the Richter Scale, it was the largest earthquake in British history, but caused only minor damage as it was offshore.
1946–47	Severe winter	Right after WWII, blizzards blocked roads and cause blackouts, resulting in industrial stagnation. It was followed by heavy flooding in March, causing £250–375 million of damage.
1952	Lynmouth Flood	34 people were killed, with a further 420 made homeless. Over 100 buildings were destroyed.
1953	North Sea flood	307 were killed in the United Kingdom, in the counties of Lincolnshire, Norfolk, Suffolk and Essex.
1955	UK heatwave	Heatwave and drought throughout the country.
1962	Great Sheffield Gale	High winds affected much of the United Kingdom, causing particular devastation in Sheffield, killing nine people.
1962–63	Severe winter	Coldest winter for hundreds of years, temperatures as low as −16 °C (3 °F).
1968	July 1968 England and Wales dust fall storms	Dust from the Sahara desert causes extremely heavy rain and hail, causing widespread damage across Wales and western and northern England.
1968	Great Flood	Flooding causes extensive damage to Southern England.
1968	Scotland Hurricane	Hurricane-force winds cause 20 deaths in the Central Belt of Scotland. In Glasgow alone, over 300 houses were destroyed and 70,000 homes were damaged. Electrical power also failed in Glasgow, leaving the whole city in darkness. In total, the storm felled 8,000 hectares of forest across Scotland (1.6 million cubic metres of timber). The storm, which affected Northern England, Scotland and Northern Ireland, received little attention from the BBC or the national press.
1976	Gale of January 1976	The gale of 2–5 January resulted in severe wind damage across western and central Europe and coastal flooding around the southern North Sea coasts. At the time, this was the most severe storm over the British Isles.
1974–1976	Two-year drought and heatwaves, including the 1976 British Isles heatwave	1974–1975 was the mildest winter in England and Wales since 1869. However, during the first few days of June 1975, in and around London snow and sleet occurred. During the next week maximum temperatures of 27 °C (81 °F) were recorded each day across the country. Later, August 1975 was nationally the second-hottest on record in the nationwide series dating back to 1884, with an extended period starting from late July of temperatures regularly reaching over 30 °C (86 °F). August 8th saw temperatures as high as 34.2 °C (93.6 °F). The autumn of 1975 was notably dry. The summer of 1976 experienced five days of temperatures exceeding 35 °C (95 °F) somewhere in the UK. Between 23 June to 7 July, temperatures in London and other parts of Southern England reached above 32 °C (90 °F) for 15 consecutive days. The weather was settled and temperatures were above average, with many short and long periods of above 30 °C (86 °F) heat, between mid June to mid September. In 1976, the country suffered forest fires, grass fires and water shortages. Summer 1976 was followed by an extremely unsettled autumn.
1978	North Sea storm surge	A storm surge which occurred over 11–12 January caused extensive coastal flooding and considerable damage on the east coast of England between the Humber and Kent. Locally severe flooding occurred in Lincolnshire, The Wash, north Norfolk and Kent. Improvements in flood protection following the devastating flood of 1953 meant that the catastrophic losses seen during that storm were not repeated. The storm caused severe damage to many piers along the east coast of England.
1981	UK tornado outbreak	The 1981 United Kingdom tornado outbreak is regarded as the largest tornado outbreak in European history. 104 confirmed tornadoes touched down across Wales and central, northern and eastern England. 8 injuries were recorded but there were no casualties.
1981-now	AIDS outbreak	The first case of AIDS in the United Kingdom was reported in December 1981. The patient was a 49-year-old gay man who regularly visited Florida and was referred to a London hospital with opportunistic infections. The first UK death from AIDS was in London in July 1982, and was attributed to Terry Higgins, who was one of the first people in the UK to die of an AIDS-related illness. Millions of people have died from this plague since 1981.
1987	Great Storm	After Michael Fish famously forecast "very windy" weather mainly over France, an unusually strong storm occurred in October 1987, with wind speeds widely over 100 mph (160 km/h) along England's southern coastline, and which killed 18 people in England. The great storm caused substantial damage over much of Southern England, downing an estimated 15 million trees (including six of the seven eponymous oaks in Sevenoaks).
Latest 1980s - Late 1990s	Recurring droughts, heatwaves and exceptionally mild winters	Starting from c. November 1988, the UK experienced regular periods of abnormally mild, warm and notably dry conditions over the 1990s. Historically mild winters include 1988/89, 1989/90, 1994/95 and 1997/98, with several other particularly mild spells across other winters, such as in January 1993. Unusually hot spells include the extended summer of 1989, July and August 1990, May 1992, July 1994, the summer of 1995 and August 1997. The periods November 1988 - August 1990 and c. April 1995 - February 1998 were particularly dry for part or all of the UK. Note that there were significant breaks in the drought, and weather at times chaotically swung between dry and wet extremes, so this list may not be exhaustive.
Late 1988 - 1990	Prolonged warm and dry conditions, including the 1990 United Kingdom heatwave	From c. November 1988, part or all of the UK experienced a prolonged warm and dry spell, with winter 1988/89 being the mildest on record. Conditions were particularly warm and notably dry from May to September 1989, with May and July being particularly dry. The abnormally mild conditions returned in winter 1989/90. From March 1990, the southern half of the country experienced a prolonged drought, with consecutive months of below average rainfall. May in particular was historically dry. By July, temperatures were persistently hotter than average, and this culminated in the August 1990 heatwave, which saw three consecutive days above 35.2 °C (95.4 °F), peaking at a value of 37.1 °C (98.8 °F) at Cheltenham on the 3rd, which if accurate, was the highest temperature ever recorded in UK history, although this reading is disputed and a figure of 36.5 °C (97.7 °F) recorded at Heathrow Airport and Cambridge may be more reliable. Temperatures remained elevated for the rest of August and later reached 30 °C (86 °F) again. Conditions were less settled from September, but both October and November saw notably warm spells and both the autumn and winter of 1990 remained dry, with significant rainfall only arriving from March 1991.
1990	Burns' Day Storm	Winds of up to 100 mph (160 km/h) kill 47 people and cause £3.37 billion worth of damage, the most costly weather event for insurers in British history.
1990–91	Severe winter	Periods of heavy snow and rainstorms lasting from December 1990 to February 1991 throughout the United Kingdom, Ireland and Western Europe. About 42 people died, almost all in the UK and Ireland.
1991–92	New Year's Day Storm	The most violent winds ever successfully recorded unofficially hit the Northern isles of Scotland, with winds exceeding 200 mph (320 km/h), leading to the deaths of 2 people in Unst, Shetland and 1 person in Frei, Norway.
1995 - 1998	Prolonged hot and dry conditions, including the 1995 United Kingdom heatwave	Following the dry and hot summer of 1994, from c. April 1995 part or all of the UK experienced extremely dry conditions, with all months between May and August 1995 being notably dry, June and August in particular being among the driest on record. By the end of June, temperatures were regularly surpassing 30 °C (86 °F). Between July 30th and August 5th, temperatures remained above 30 °C (86 °F), with a peak of 35.2 °C (95.4 °F) recorded at Boxworth in Cambridgeshire, although this figure is disputed and a more reliable figure is perhaps 34.7 °C (94.5 °F) recorded at Kew Gardens (a higher figure of 34.9 °C (94.8 °F) recorded there on the 2nd is unreliable). Temperatures remained elevated all month and August 1995 is the hottest on record in all series. September saw a significant break in the spell, but by October conditions were notably dry again and October in particular was among the mildest on record. A pronounced lack of wetter than average conditions over 1996, along with a notably dry March, meant that the UK was facing significant water supply issues by summer. Autumn 1996 was again dry, and January 1997 was the driest on record. 1997 saw violent swings between notably dry and notably wet conditions, with March, April and October being notably dry, and June being the wettest of the 20th century. From November conditions remained wetter than average, but winter 1997/98 was again dry and mild. From March 1998, conditions turned much wetter and would largely remain wet until the early 2000s.
Early 1998 - Early 2003	Prolonged wetter than average conditions and repeated flooding episodes	From March 1998, the UK experienced overwhelmingly wetter than average conditions, with few breaks. Both 1998 and 2000 are among the wettest years on record, with particularly wet episodes occurring in April and July 1998, April 2000 and autumn 2000. The latter two are both the wettest of their kind on record. All years between 1998 and 2002 were wetter than usual. Springs had a tendency to arrive late with more colder than average Marches and Aprils than average or warm over this period. Winters were very mild, continuing the spell of mild winters from the 1990s. By 2002 the wetter than average conditions were in decline and the year saw the first notable dry spells since 1997. From February 2003 the UK would see a significantly dry spell with generally drier than average conditions prevailing until May 2007.
1998	Easter floods	At the start of Easter 1998 (9–10 April) a stationary band of heavy rain affected the Midlands. This resulted in floods in which five people died and thousands had to be evacuated from their homes. The wettest area, with over 75 mm (3.0 in), stretched from Worcestershire towards The Wash and the flooded towns included Evesham, Leamington Spa, Stratford-upon-Avon, Bedford, Northampton and Huntingdon. On Maundy Thursday (9 April), thundery rain in the south of England moved northwards and became slow-moving from East Anglia through the Midlands to north Wales. This band gave some very heavy downpours with hail and thunder. On Good Friday (10th) the band rotated slowly anticlockwise spreading to Lincolnshire and the West Country and continued to rotate, with sleet and heavy bursts of rain in places. There was sleet and snow across the Pennines and north Wales during the evening.
2000	Autumn 2000 Western Europe floods	Severe flooding hit many parts of the UK. Among the worst hit were York, Kent (incl. Maidstone), Sussex (incl. Lewes and Uckfield) and Shrewsbury.
2002	Glasgow floods	200 people immediately evacuated, and the water supply for 140,000 people was affected.
2003	European heatwave	More than 2,000 people may have died in the UK alone as a result of the hottest summer recorded in Europe since at least 1540, and possibly in thousands of years. Temperatures remained above 30 °C (86 °F) for 10 days, between 3 and 13 August. The highest temperature known and accepted was recorded at Faversham, Kent on 10 August when it reached 38.5 °C (101.3 °F). The death toll across Europe as a result of the heatwave was eventually estimated at 70,000.
2004	Boscastle flood	Boscastle and Crackington Haven, two villages in Cornwall, were heavily damaged due to flash floods.
2005	Cyclone Gudrun	Significant flooding was seen in Cumbria, which was the hardest hit area in the UK, and affected more than 3,000 properties.
2005	Birmingham Tornado	30 injuries caused by the tornado, which uprooted trees, destroyed roofs and picked up cars, causing £40 million in damage.
2006	London tornado	Only one injury, but £10 million of damage caused.
2007	Storm Kyrill	Hurricane-force winds across the British Isles, at least 11 people dead.
2007	UK floods	Killed 13 people. Gloucestershire suffered many road and rail closures, power cuts and evacuations, with 420,000 inhabitants left without drinking water requiring emergency assistance from the army. Other areas heavily affected included Yorkshire, Hull and Worcestershire. The disaster is estimated to have caused £6 billion of damage.
2008	Floods	River Wansbeck bursts its banks causing damage to 995 properties costing £40 million. Flooding across the Midlands and North East England associated with a slow moving front of the low pressure system Mattea.
2009	Swine flu pandemic	Global outbreak of a new strain of influenza A virus subtype H1N1. First cases confirmed 27 April 2009 in passengers returning from Mexico. 392 people were confirmed to have died in the UK.
2009	Great Britain and Ireland floods	Strong winds and heavy rain across the United Kingdom with the worst flooding concentrated in Cumbria. Four people were killed as a direct result of the flooding.
2009	February 2009 snowfall	55 cm (22 in) of snow in places, causing at least four deaths and an estimated £1.3 billion in damages.
2009–10	Severe winter	Reported to be the coldest weather since 1987. About 22 people died.
2010–11	Severe winter	The winter of 2010–2011 brought heavy snowfalls, record low temperatures, travel chaos and school disruption to Great Britain and Ireland. It included the UK's coldest December since Met Office records began in 1910, with a mean temperature of −1 °C (30 °F), breaking the previous record of 0.1 °C (32.2 °F) in December 1981.
2012	Great Britain and Ireland floods	A series of low pressure systems steered by the jet stream bring the wettest April in 100 years, and flooding across Britain and Ireland. Continuing through May and leading to the wettest beginning to June in 150 years, with flooding and extreme events occurring periodically throughout Britain and parts of Western Europe. On 9 June, severe flooding began around Aberystwyth, West Wales with people evacuated from two holiday parks. 150 people saved by lifeboats with 4–5 ft (1.2–1.5 m) of water. On 28 June, a large low-pressure area moved across Northern Ireland. Its fronts brought heavy rain and large hail to many areas in England. One man died from the storm.
2012–13	Swansea measles epidemic	Beginning in November 2012, there were a total of 1,219 cases of measles across Wales. 88 people were hospitalised during the epidemic and one person died.
2013	St. Jude storm	Torrential rain and winds of up to 100 mph (160 km/h) hit the south of England and Wales. 600,000 homes were left without power, and five people were killed. In Europe, another six people were killed by the same storm.
2013	British Isles heatwave	An extra 760 deaths were reported in the UK. In Ireland, the heatwave indirectly caused 30 deaths by drowning.
2013	Cyclone Xaver	On 5 December 2013, a large depression that passed eastwards over Scotland brought strong northerly winds along the eastern coast of Britain. This coincided with the spring tide and caused a large tidal surge to affect large swathes of the east coast. Many settlements along the coast were severely flooded, with sea defences breached in many locations.
2013–14	Winter storms	During the winter of 2013–14, the British Isles were in the path of several winter storms, which culminated in serious coastal damage and widespread persistent flooding. The storms brought the greatest January rainfall in Southern England since at least the year records began in 1910. The season saw persistent flooding on the Somerset Levels with recurrent fluvial flooding in Southern England of the non-tidal Thames, Severn and in Kent, Sussex and Hampshire and the Stour in Dorset. Briefer coastal flooding and wave battering damage took place in exposed parts of Dorset, Devon and Cornwall.
2015–16	GB and Ireland floods	Flooding in Cumbria, Yorkshire, southern Scotland and parts of Ireland.
2017	Hurricane Ophelia	During the autumn of 2017, Ireland and the United Kingdom were hit by Hurricane Ophelia, which had completed its transition into an extratropical cyclone shortly before its landfall in Ireland and subjected the island to hurricane-force winds. Three people were killed by fallen trees in Ireland and 22,000 people were left without electricity. This also cut off internet access for some households across the UK.
2018	Cold wave	Britain and Ireland were struck by a cold wave which began on 22 February and would affect most of Europe. Officially named Anticyclone Hartmut, the cold wave brought unusually low temperatures and heavy snowfall to the UK and would later combine with Storm Emma which would make landfall over South West England and Southern Ireland on 2 March. The lowest temperature recorded was −14.7 °C in Cairn Gorm. The cold spell was nicknamed the Beast from the East. 17 people in total died from this cold wave, with 95 casualties across Europe. This spell of cold weather cost £1.2 billion in damages.
2018	Heatwave	Summer 2018 was the fifth hottest in the CET records back to 1659, with the period May–July being the hottest such period on record. During this period there was very little rainfall, with particularly low totals in North West England and South East England. Some places had more than 54 consecutive days without rainfall. This led to wildfires. The dry weather continued into the autumn, with most places seeing less than 90% of average rainfall between September and November. By November 2018, Northern England, the Northern Midlands, Eastern England and some parts of East Anglia were still ranked as 'severely dry'.
2018	Wildfires	From June 2018, many destructive wildfires struck the United Kingdom; the most prolonged and severe of these were in England, with some fires burning for over a month.
2019–20	Floods	Flooding in much of England in November. 2019 was the wettest year on record across parts of the Midlands, Central and Northern England. Storm Ciara and Storm Dennis caused more flooding in February.
2020–	COVID-19 pandemic	Worldwide pandemic of COVID-19, a disease caused by SARS-CoV-2, a new coronavirus originating in China, has caused over 188 million cases and more than 4 million deaths globally as of July 2021. The United Kingdom recorded more than 22 million cases and 178,064 COVID-19 deaths as of May 2022.
2021	European floods	Heavy rainfall on 12 July resulted in more than the average monthly rainfall total to be recorded in a 24-hour period across parts of the country. The London Fire Brigade received over 1000 calls relating to flooding, and Thames Water more than 2500 calls, as sewers filled up and flooded. There was also flooding in Southampton. By 14 July, the low pressure system moved over mainland Europe.
2022	Storm Eunice	Three deaths, many injuries, as many as 1.4 million homes without power, widespread destruction and over £360 million in damage.
2024	Storm Darragh	Three deaths, over 1.1 million power outages and widespread damage to buildings.
2025	Storm Éowyn	One death, over 1 million people without power and widespread damage to buildings.
2026	Storm Goretti	Two deaths, over 65,000 homes were left without power across the UK alone with over 500 schools closed across Scotland and the Midlands. Widespread damage to buildings were reported across the country. Although not recorded in the UK, the highest wind gust from Goretti reached 132 mph (59 m/s; 115 kt; 212 km/h) in Barfleur, Manche, France.
2026	Severe Heatwave	

== See also ==
- List of disasters in Great Britain and Ireland by death toll
- Climate of the United Kingdom
- Geology of Great Britain
- Geology of Ireland
- Tsunamis affecting the British Isles
- Drought in the United Kingdom
- Floods in the United Kingdom
- List of natural disasters in Ireland
