= St Mary's Church, Nash =

Coordinates: 51.5480°N 2.9488°W

Church of St Mary, Nash
- Church of St Mary the Virgin, Nash
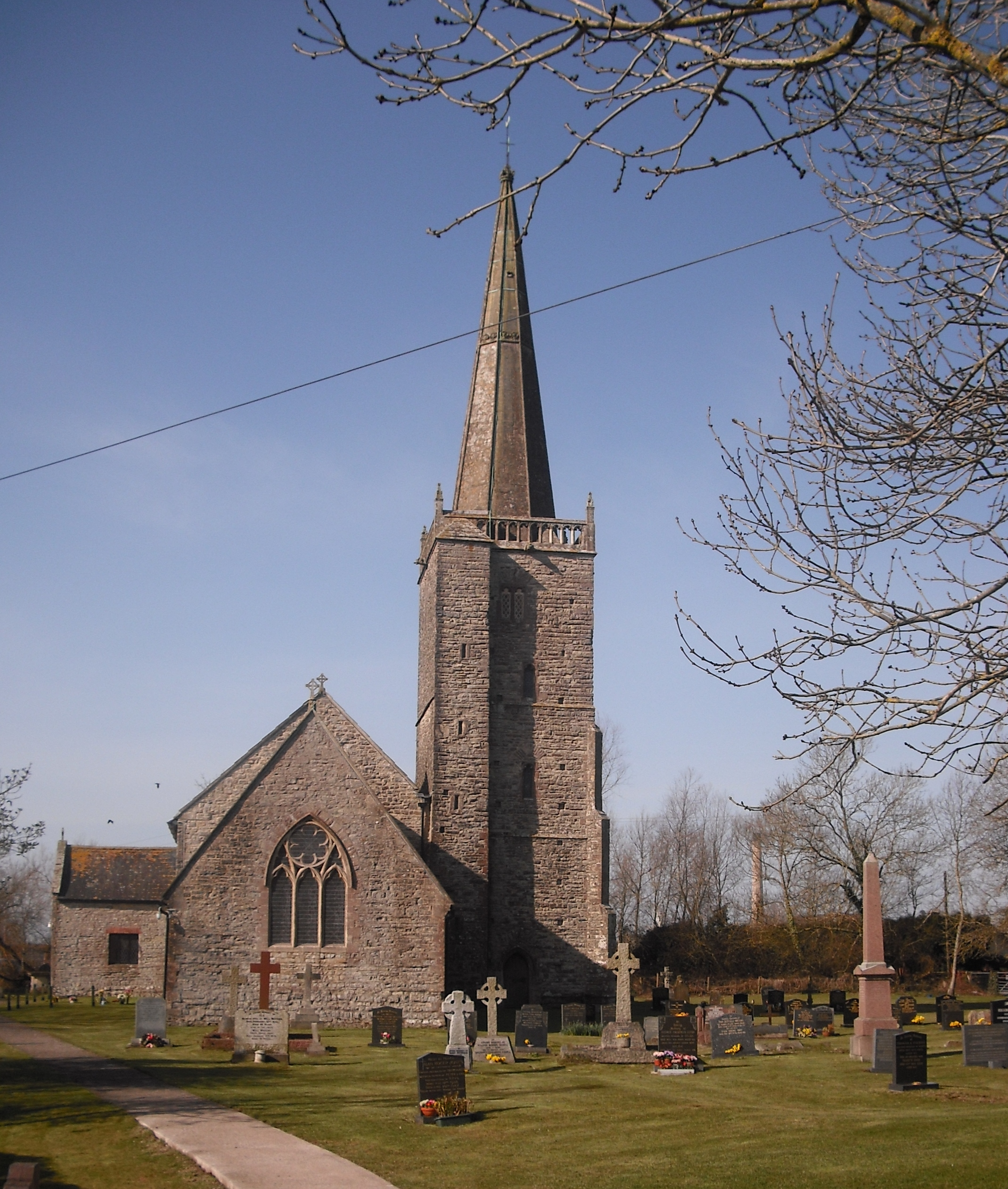
- The church from the east
- Church of St Mary, Nash
- Location: Nash
- Country: Wales
- Denomination: Church in Wales

History
- Status: Active
- Dedication: St Mary

Architecture
- Functional status: Parish church
- Heritage designation: Grade I
- Designated: 3 January 1963

Administration
- Diocese: Monmouth
- Parish: Rectorial Benefice of Magor

The Church of St Mary the Virgin, Nash is the parish church of the village of Nash, situated about 2 miles (3.2 km) south of the city of Newport, Wales. Described as "the cathedral of the moors" by Monmouthshire historian Fred Hando, the large church is medieval in origin, with additions and restorations dating from the 18th and 19th centuries. Newman describes the 15th-century steeple as "unique in South East Wales". Since 3 January 1963 it has been designated a Grade I listed building primarily due to its "medieval tower with fine spire."

== Description ==
The church consists of three parts. It has a three-story 15th-century steeple with an octagonal spire, but provides no access to the body of the church. The nave is 18th-century and the chancel 19th-century. The interior has "a complete Georgian ensemble of gallery, box pews and three-decker pulpit." Since 3 January 1963 it has been designated a Grade I listed building. primarily due to its "medieval tower with fine spire."

== History ==
The church belonged to Goldcliff Priory in 1349 when Robert Arney was instituted to the benefice. The Arney family, in the time of Charles II, left a cottage and 6 acres (2.4 ha) of land, called "The Poor's Six Acres", for the support of the poor of the parish. The church was largely rebuilt during the 16th century.

The only remains of the Norman church is the North Wall of the chancel and the squint or hagioscope. An unusual feature, the squint was used to enable those with leprosy, smallpox or other such diseases, to see or participate in the service without endangering the rest of the congregation with infection. The tower is unusually located on the north side of the chancel. The church is thought to originally have been much larger, incorporating a North aisle.

In the early years of the 20th century the floor of the bellringer's room was used as a temporary mortuary for the bodies of five sailors who had been drowned at sea, in a violent storm, near the East Usk Lighthouse. Four of the sailors had been found lashed to the mast. During World War II the church saw congregations of 400.

The church interior was restored in 2004–2005.

Described as "the cathedral of the moors" by Monmouthshire historian Fred Hando. Newman says the 15th-century steeple is "unique in South East Wales".

== Great flood of 1607 ==
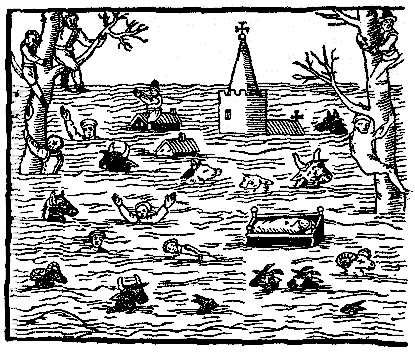
Contemporary depiction of the 1607 flood with a church thought to be St Mary's

On 30 January 1607 the Bristol Channel floods drowned many people and destroyed a large amount of farmland and livestock; recent research has suggested that the cause is likely to have been a storm surge. There is a memorial plaque in St Mary's Church in neighbouring Goldcliff. A contemporary depiction of the flood shows a church thought to be St Mary's, Nash.
