= List of natural disasters in the British Isles =

For natural disasters in the British Isles, see:

- List of natural disasters in the United Kingdom
- List of natural disasters in Ireland
