= Dijkshoek =

Dijkshoek Dykshoeke (West Frisian)
- Hamlet
- Location in the province of Friesland in the Netherlands Dijkshoek (Netherlands)
- Coordinates: 53.26129°N 5.54628°E
- Country: Netherlands
- Province: Friesland
- Municipality: Waadhoeke
- Village: Firdgum
- Elevation: 0.7 m (2.3 ft)

Population
  - Total: c. 15
- Time zone: UTC+1 (CET)
  - Summer (DST): UTC+2 (CEST)
- Postcode: 8852
- Area code: 0518

Dijkshoek (Dutch: [ˈdɛiksɦuk]; West Frisian: Dykshoeke [ˈdikshukə]) is a hamlet in the Dutch municipality of Waadhoeke in the province of Friesland. It is located near the Wadden Sea north of Tzummarum and northwest of Firdgum, of which it is a part administratively. The settlement of the hamlet is located on the Camstrawei, consisting of mainly farms on the edge of the Hornestreek.

Dijkshoek is mainly known for its location. It is a crossroads and border point; southwest of Westhoek, east of Koehool (where a bunker complex stood during the Second World War) and west of the Griene Dyk.

The hamlet was potentially first attested as Dijkshorn in 1287, the year in which the region was completely destroyed by the St. Lucia's flood. The hamlet later also appears as Dyckshoek in 1664, Dijkshoek in 1840, and Dykshoek in 1841. The name is a combination of dijk ('dyke') and hoek ('corner') as it is located on the corner of the Waddenzeedijk and the Griene Dyk. There once was an inn located in the hamlet.

The hamlet was part of the municipality of Barradeel until 1984, when it became part of Franekeradeel. In 2018, Franekeradeel became part of the current municipality of Waadhoeke.
