= Koehool =

Koehool Koehoal (West Frisian)
- Hamlet
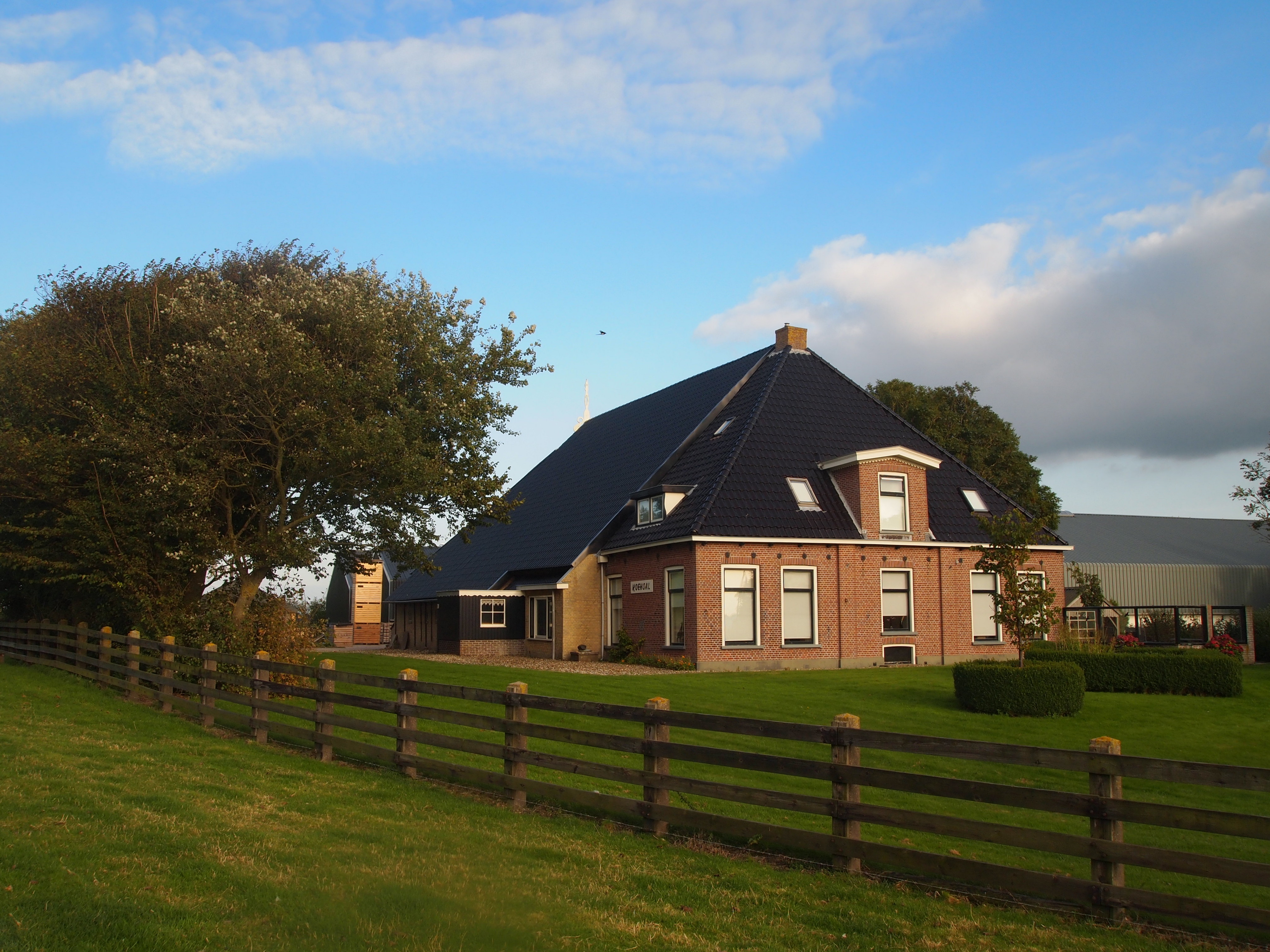
- Farmhouse in Koehool

- Location in the province of Friesland in the Netherlands Koehool (Netherlands)
- Coordinates: 53.25611°N 5.52827°E
- Country: Netherlands
- Province: Friesland
- Municipality: Waadhoeke
- Villages: Tzummarum; Oosterbierum
- Elevation: 0.3 m (0.98 ft)

Population
  - Total: c. 50
- Time zone: UTC+1 (CET)
  - Summer (DST): UTC+2 (CEST)
- Postcode: 8851; 8854
- Area code: 0518

Koehool (Dutch pronunciation: [ˈkuɦoːl]; West Frisian: Koehoal) is a hamlet in the Dutch municipality of Waadhoeke in the province of Friesland. It is located on the Wadden Sea north of Tzummarum and west of Dijkshoek and Westhoek. The settlement of the hamlet is located on the Sedyk (Dutch: Zeedijk) in the Horne region.

The hamlet runs from Sedyk 1 to Sedyk 1, which can be quite confusing. One house number 1 is administratively part of Oosterbierum while the other, like the rest of the hamlet, is part of Tzummarum. The residences consist of both farms and houses, mainly in the style of small fishermen's houses.

== History ==
In the monastic chronicles of the monastery of Lidlum, dated to the fourteenth century, the place appears as Cadahool. That name probably refers to a place near the old location of the monastery, a little further south of present-day Koehool. A mention from 1429 spells 't Koudehol, and one from 1511 spells Caudehoel. There was then a lock that was called the Coudehoelstera zyl in 1525. On a sixteenth-century map it is spelled Cohool. In 1546 the name was written as Kahoel and Coldhoe also occurs. The modern spelling Koehool can already be found on eighteenth- and nineteenth-century maps.

The second part of the place name originated from hol which can mean 'low, swampy place', but also 'inlet or bed'. The first part comes from the Frisian kald, which can mean 'uninhabited, deserted', but can also mean 'cold'.

Between about 1300 and 1584 there was a lock, the Koehoolsterzijl, in the seawall near Koehool. The outflow to the sea was quite small there and in 1562 it was observed that: de stroom liep zoe zacht uyt dat 't men nauwelincx coste zien van datter waeter uyt liep (transl. the current was so gentle that one could barely see the water running out). This could fit an alternative etymology if one considers one other meaning of kald or the Dutch variant, koud: 'insignificant' or 'not much'.

== Sights ==
- De Waadfisker ('The Wadden Fisher'): a statue by Frans Ram. It is located at the bottom of the seawall as a reminder of the herring fishery using traps that were set up perpendicular to the sea wall. Due to the construction of the Afsluitdijk, hundreds of wading fishermen in this region lost their jobs.
- Stelling Koehool: a bunker complex constructed by the German occupiers during the Second World War as part of the Atlantic Wall. It consisted of four bunkers. A bunker has been preserved and restored. It has served as an educational center since 2011.

== Gallery ==
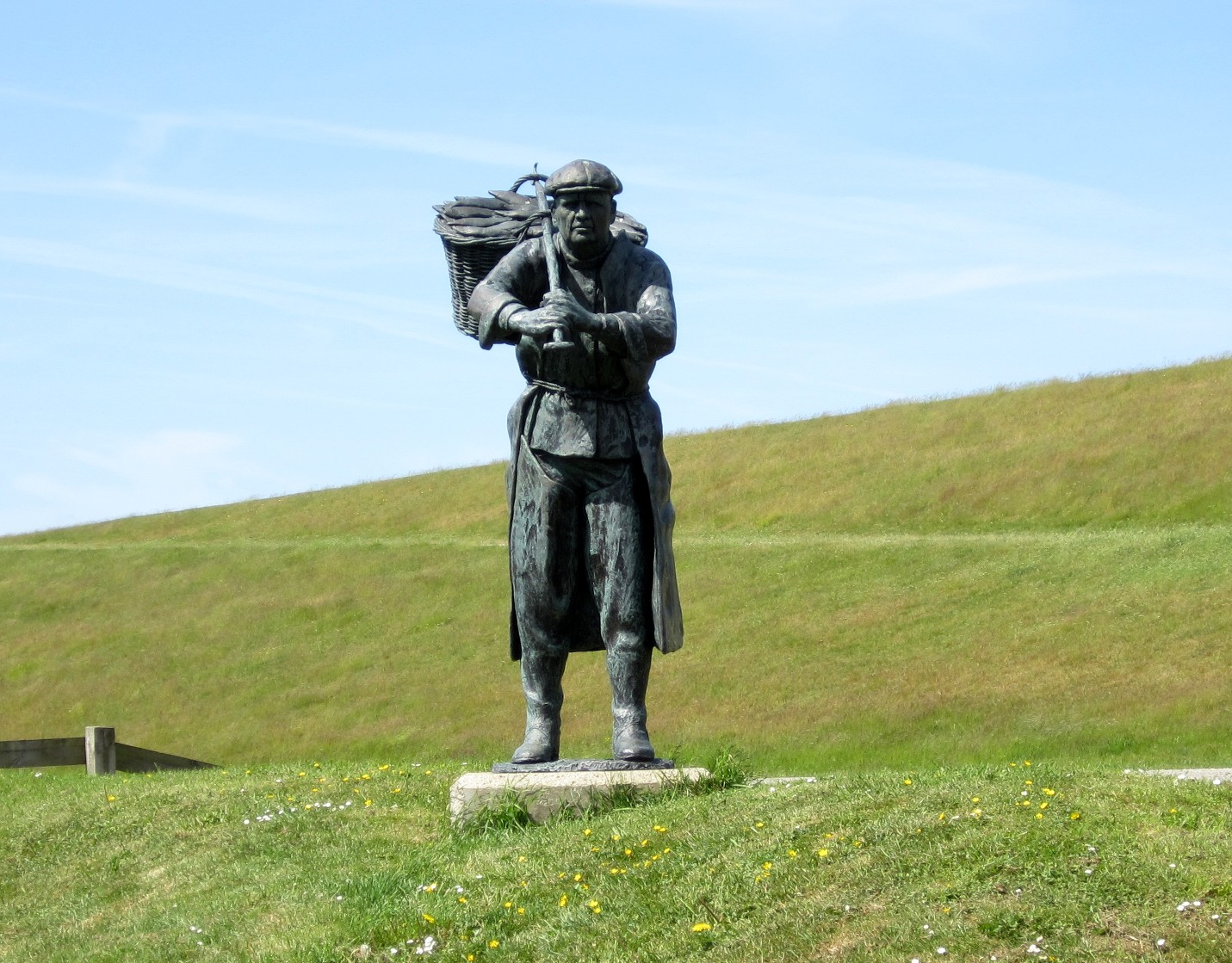
De Waadfisker

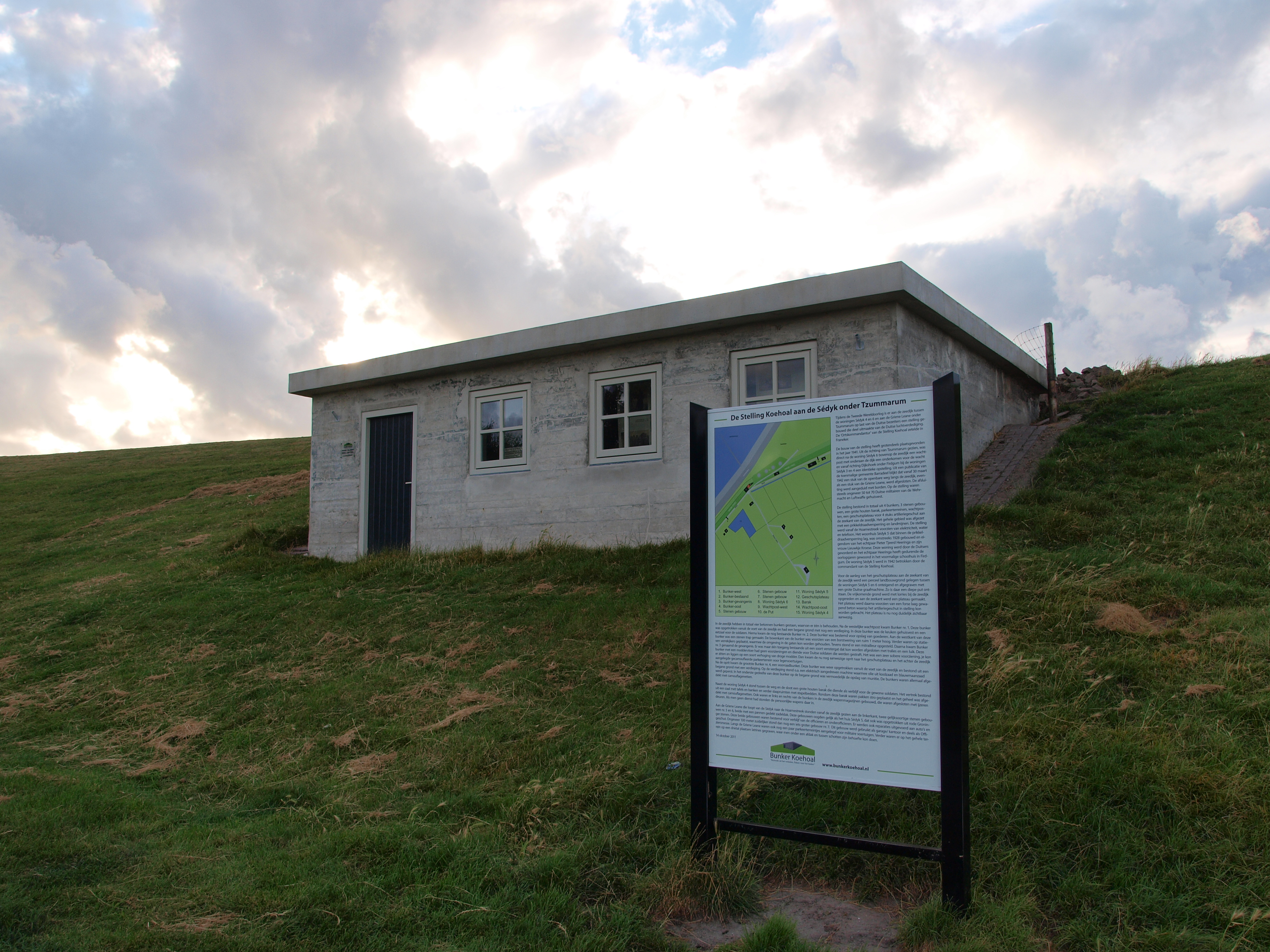
Koehool bunker

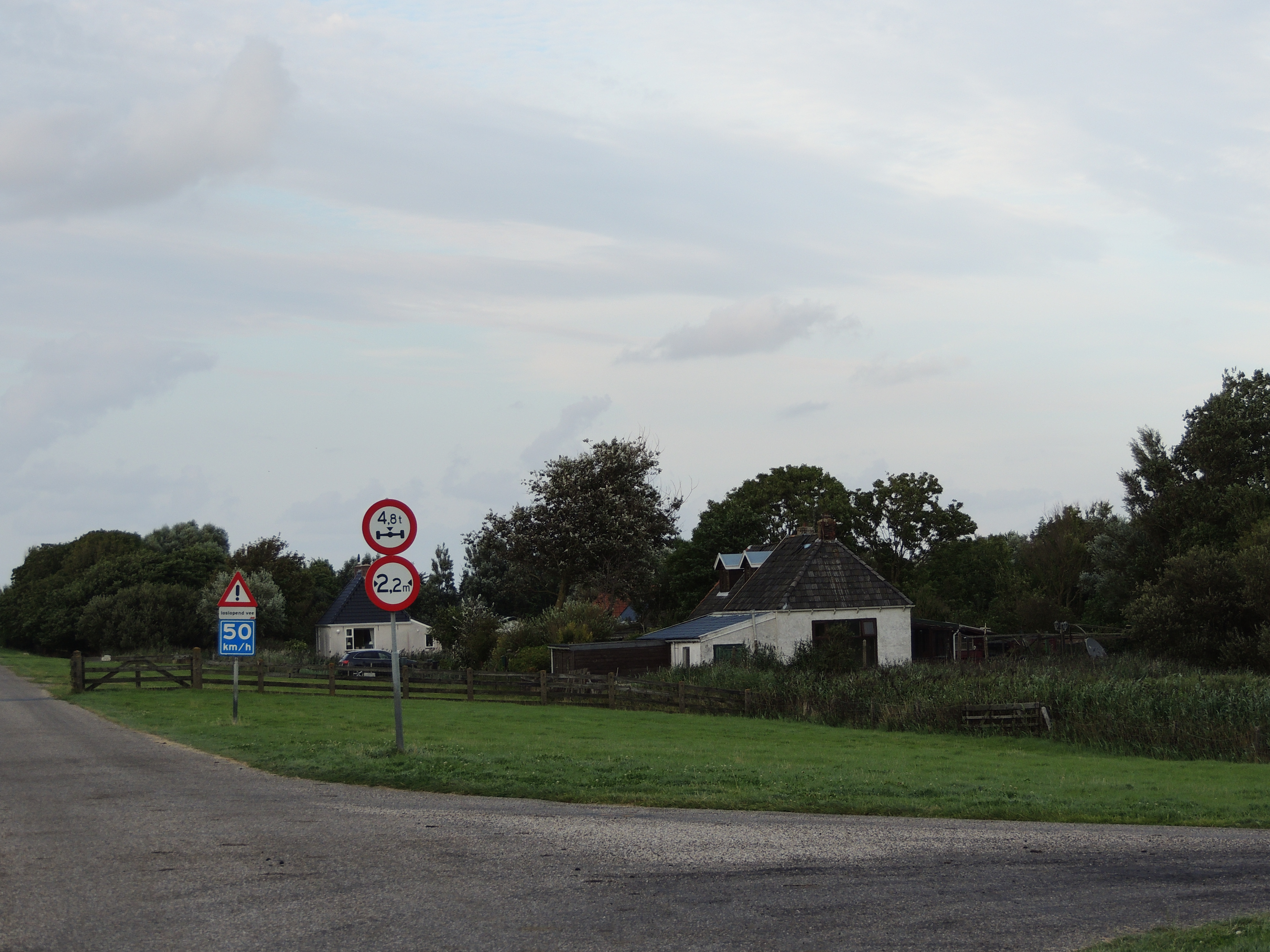
Koehool houses

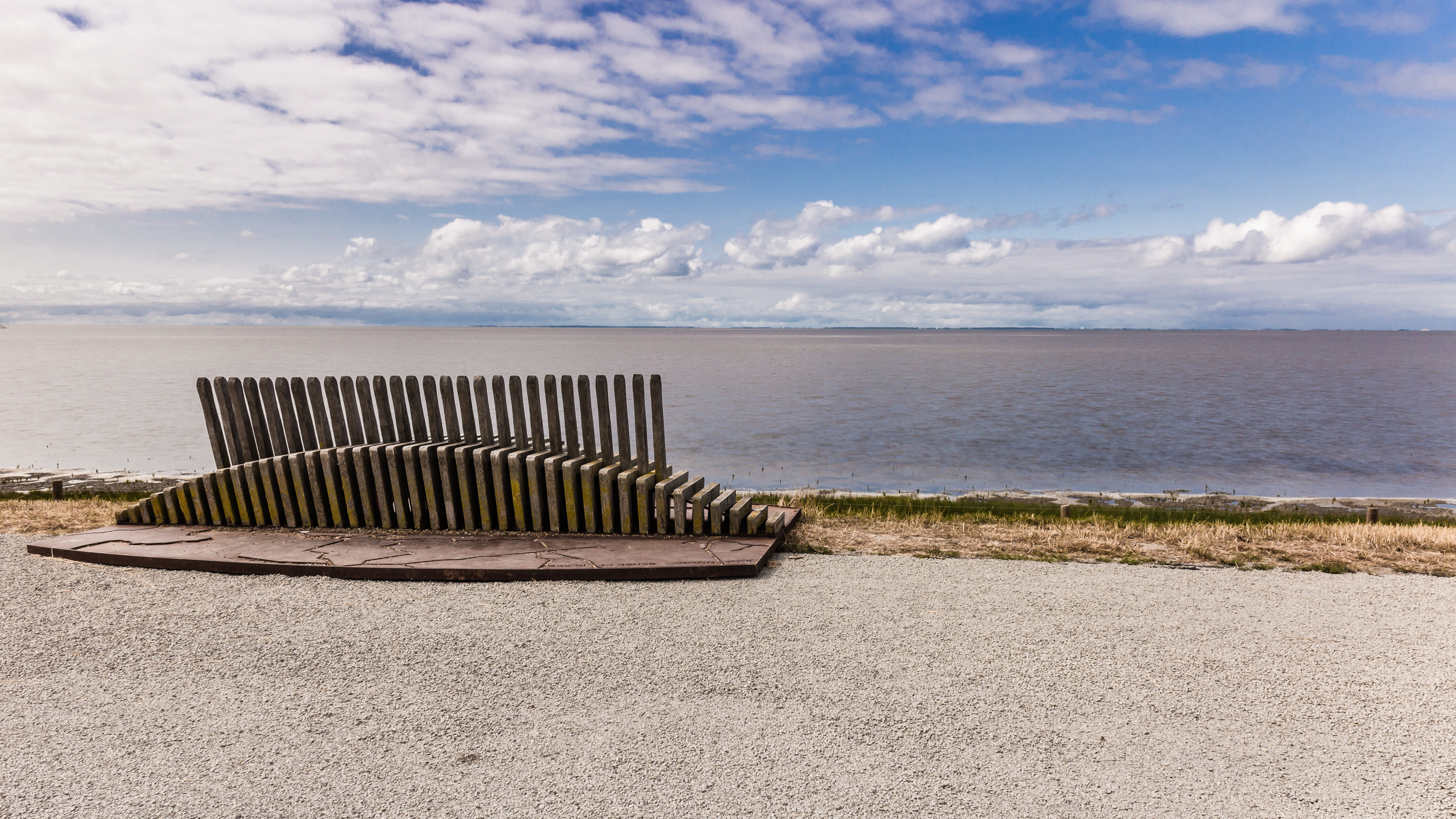
Artwork ‘Watdataaangaat’ on the sea dike near Koehool.

Sea dike at Koehool. view of the mudflats and the Wadden Sea at low tide. Rain coming.
