= Greyfriars, Dunwich =

English country

Coordinates: 52.2755°N 1.6307°E

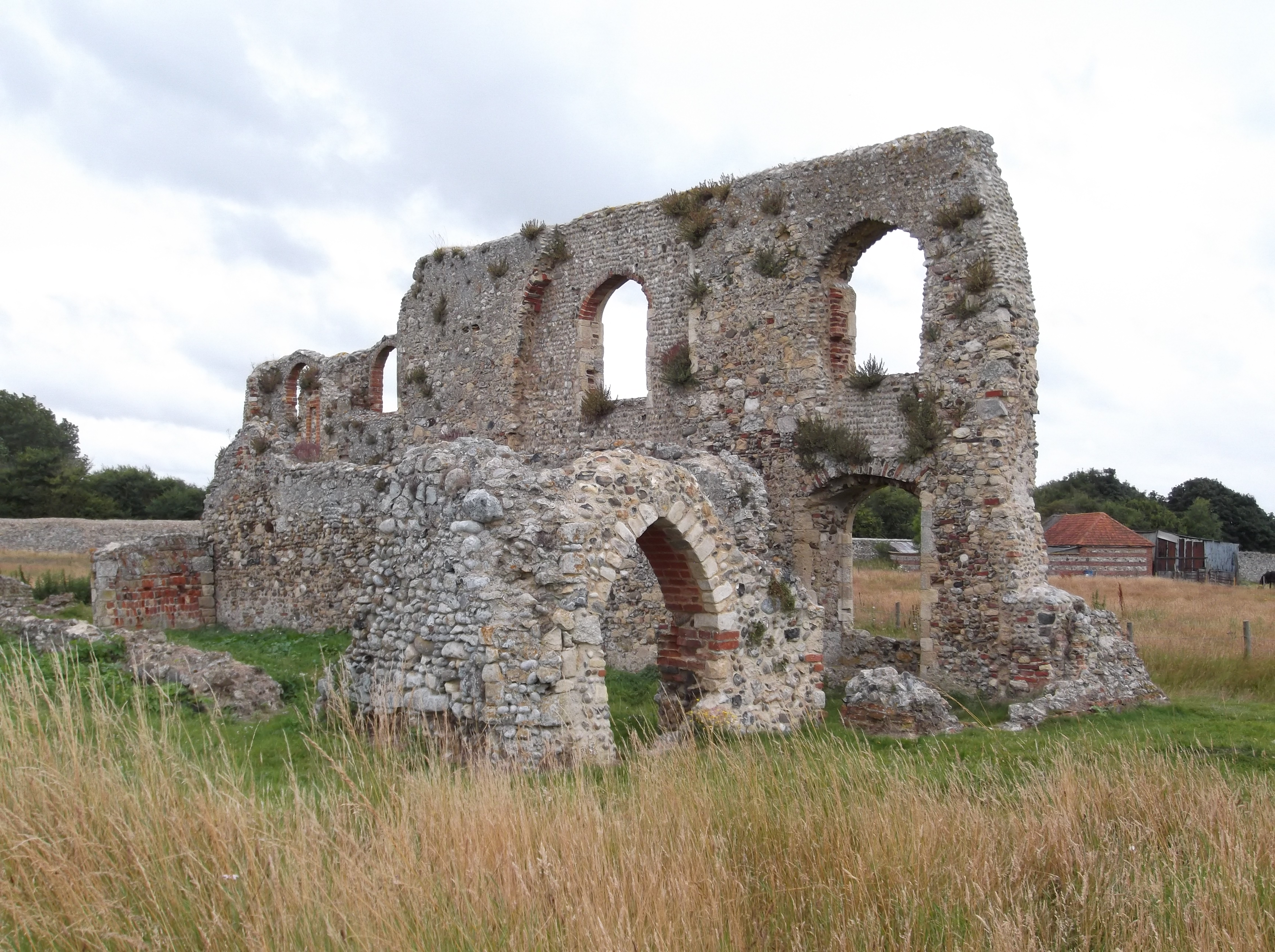
- Remains of Greyfriars Priory south range buildings, probably the refectory

- Location within Suffolk
- Interactive map of Greyfriars, Dunwich

Monastery information
- Order: Franciscan
- Established: Before 1277
- Disestablished: 1538

People
- Founders: Richard FitzJohn and Alice

Architecture
- Status: Ruins
- Heritage designation: Grade II* listed building, Scheduled Monument

Site
- Location: Dunwich, Suffolk, England
- Country: England
- Public access: Yes
- Website: Dunwich Greyfriars Trust

Greyfriars, Dunwich was a Franciscan friary in Dunwich in the English county of Suffolk. The friary was founded before 1277 by Richard FitzJohn and his wife Alice and dissolved in 1538. The original site, which had 20 friars in 1277 when it first appears in records, was threatened by coastal erosion and the friary was moved inland in 1289.

Many of the buildings are believed to have been destroyed on dissolution, with the remains used as a house, a town hall and a jail at various times. Modern remains consist of a precinct wall, two gatehouses and some two-storey walls believed to be the remains of a cloister building, possibly a refectory or infirmary building.

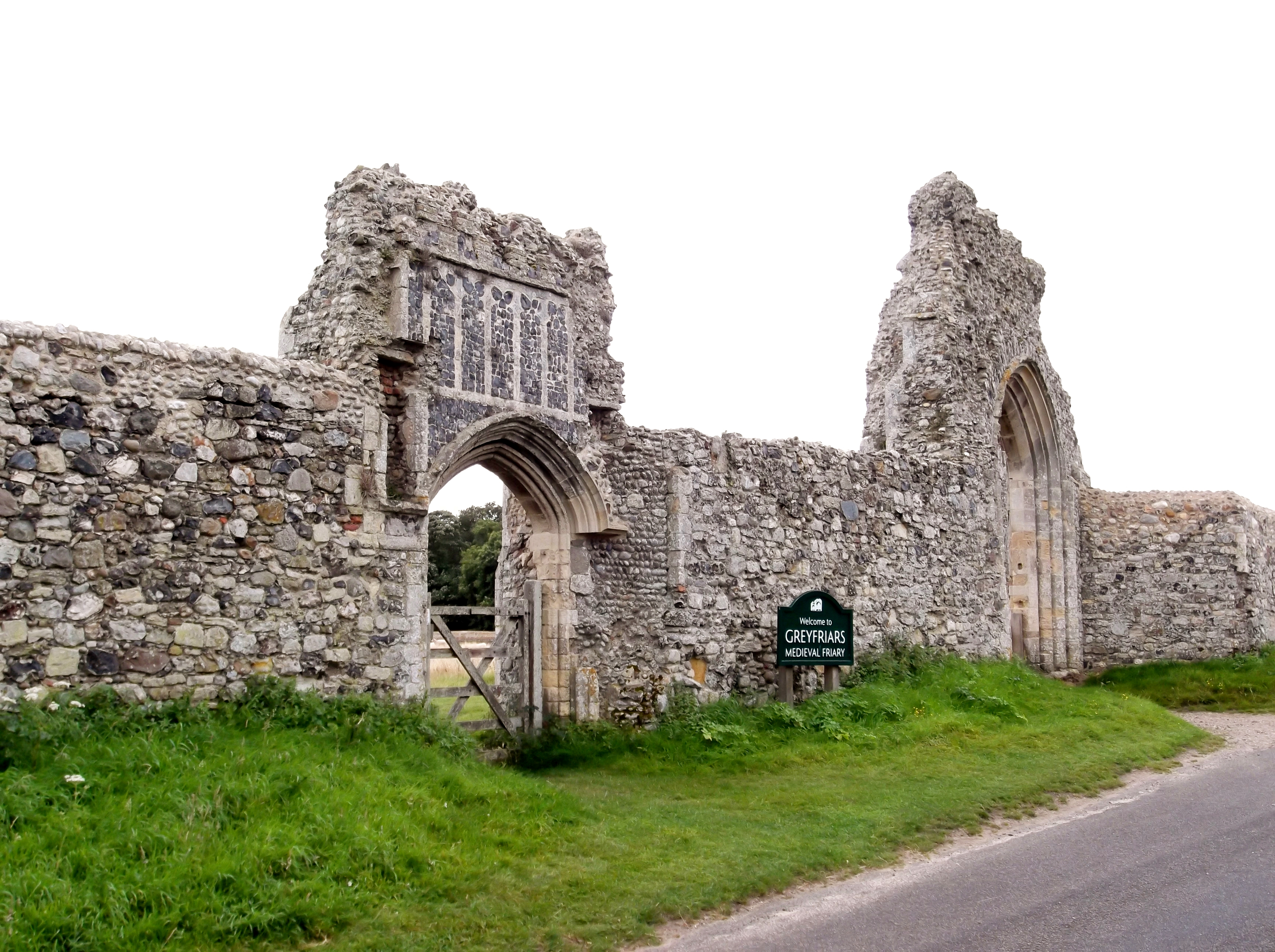
Dunwich Greyfriars gateway

The site was partly excavated in the 1930s and 1990s, with geophysical surveys being carried out on the site. The site was surveyed in 2011 as part of a dig by archaeological television programme Time Team. A geophysical survey using ground-penetrating radar confirmed a range of wall features and other anomalies in the precinct and trenches uncovered carved medieval stonework and medieval window glass fragments. Geophysical surveys suggest that the friary church may have been up to 60 metres in length.

Some restoration work was carried out in 2008, including the strengthening of some buildings and repair of collapsed section of the precinct wall. The site was then placed on the Heritage at Risk Register, leading to a £250,000 restoration project in 2012 by English Heritage and Suffolk County Council. The management of the site was taken over by a local voluntary group, the Dunwich Greyfriars Trust, in October 2013. The transfer occurred after budget cuts by the county council meant that the running costs would no longer be met by the council. The remains are classified as a Grade II* listed building and most of the site as a Scheduled Monument.

== See also ==
List of monastic houses in Suffolk
