= Old Town Hall, Dunwich =

Former municipal building in Dunwich, Suffolk, England

Old Town Hall
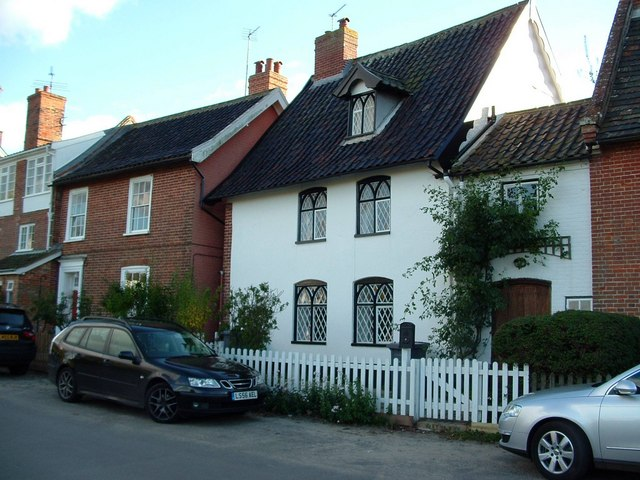
- The building in 2008

- Shown in Suffolk
- 52.2774°N 1.6311°E
- Location: St James's Street, Dunwich

History
- Built: c.1705

Site notes
- Architectural style: Tudor style

Listed Building – Grade II
- Official name: Old Town Hall
- Designated: 16 January 1984
- Reference no.: 1198313

The Old Town Hall is a former municipal building in St James's Street in Dunwich, a village in Suffolk, England. Currently operated as holiday accommodation, it is a Grade II listed building.

== History ==
The first town hall in the town was a medieval structure which may have dated back to the time that King John visited the town and presented a charter in 1216. It may well have also served as the headquarters of the local merchant's guild. Following some coastal erosion, it was rebuilt on a new site in 1663. However, the town was devastated by coastal flooding in 1702: St Peter's Church was so badly damaged that it had to be dismantled, and the town hall was destroyed.

Civic leaders decided to re-erect the whole town, including the town hall, some 0.25 miles (0.40 km) inland to protect it from the continuing coastal erosion. The new town hall was designed in the Tudor style, built using timber frame construction techniques and completed a few years later, probably about 1705. The design involved a symmetrical main frontage of two bays facing onto St James's Street. The town archives were locked in an ancient iron chest, made in The Netherlands and kept in one of the rooms in the building.

Dunwich had a very small electorate and, as most of the town had disappeared under the sea, it was recognised by the UK Parliament as a rotten borough. Its right to elect members of parliament was removed by the Reform Act 1832, and its borough council, which met in the town hall, was reformed under the Municipal Corporations Act 1883. The assets of the corporation, including the town hall, were transferred to a specially formed entity, the Dunwich Town Trust, with the lord of the manor, Colonel St John Barne of Sotterley Manor, becoming the first chairman of the trust in 1889. The town hall was subsequently converted for residential use and currently operates as holiday accommodation.

== Architecture ==
The building has a timber-framed core, with red brick external walls, with the facade being plastered, and a pantiled roof. It has two storeys and an attic, with two windows on each floor, and a single dormer window in the attic with wide bargeboards. The windows are in the Gothic style, with diamond lattice lights. There is a two-storey extension to the right, linking it to the next house, with a 20th-century door. It was grade II listed in 1984.
