= 1607 Bristol Channel floods =

Flooding in southwest England and south Wales

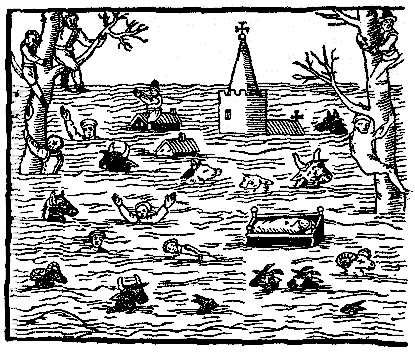
- Contemporary depiction of the 1607 flood. The church is thought to be St Mary's at Nash, near Newport.

Meteorological history
- Date: 30 January 1607

Overall effects
- Fatalities: 2,000+ (est.)
- Damage: 200 square miles (52,000 ha) (est.) of farmland destroyed
- Areas affected: Bristol Channel; Severn Estuary

The Bristol Channel floods of 30 January 1607 (Note: Modern sources for this event commonly use the Gregorian calendar; however, contemporary records record the event as having happened on 20 January 1606/07 under the Julian calendar (see for example the flood plaque, in St Mary's Church pictured on this page where the date is given as 20 January 1606). For a more detailed explanation of these changes in calendar and dating styles, see Old Style and New Style dates.) drowned many people and destroyed a large amount of farmland and livestock during a flood in the Bristol Channel. The known tide heights, probable weather, extent and depth of flooding, and coastal flooding elsewhere in the British Isles on the same day all point to the cause being a storm surge rather than a tsunami.

== Description ==
On 30 January 1607, around noon, the coasts of the Bristol Channel and Severn Estuary experienced coastal and tidal flooding in many counties. Pre-dating any modern flood defence construction, low-lying land in Devon, Somerset, Gloucestershire, and across South Wales was flooded. The devastation was particularly severe on the Welsh side, extending from Laugharne in Carmarthenshire to above Chepstow in Monmouthshire. Cardiff was the most badly affected town, with the foundations of St Mary's Church destroyed.

The impact was extensive: it is estimated that 2,000 or more people were drowned; houses and villages were swept away; and an estimated 200 square miles (51,800 ha) of farmland and livestock were destroyed. Along the coasts of the Bristol Channel and Severn Estuary, local economies suffered greatly as a result of the flooding.

The coast of Devon and the Somerset Levels as far inland as Glastonbury Tor, 14 miles (23 km) from the coast, were also affected. The sea wall at Burnham-on-Sea gave way, and the water flowed over the low-lying levels and moors.

Thirty villages in Somerset were affected, including Brean which was "swallowed up" and where seven out of the nine houses were destroyed with 26 of the inhabitants dying. For ten days the Church of All Saints at Kingston Seymour, near Weston-super-Mare, was filled with water to a depth of 5 feet (1.5 m). A chiselled mark remains showing that the maximum height of the water was 7.74 metres (25 feet 5 inches) above Ordnance Datum.

Contemporary accounts of the flood were written by people such as the Puritan pamphleteer, William Jones:

as soon as the people of those Countries, perceived that it was the violence of the Waters of the raging Seas, and that they began to exceede the compasse of their accustomed boundes, and making so furiously towardes them. happy were they that could make the best, and most speed away, many of them, leaving all their goods and substance, to the merciles Waters, being glad to escape away with life themselues: But so violent and swift were the outragiouse waves, that pursued one an other, with such vehemencie, and the Waters multiplying so much in so short a time, that in lesse then five houres space most part of those cuntreys (and especially the places which lay lowe) were all over flowen, and many hundreds of people both men women, and children were then quite devoured, by these outragious waters, such was the furie of the waves, of the Seas, the one of them dryving the other forwardes with such force and swiftnes, that it is almost incredible for any to beleeve the same....Many there were which fled into the tops of high trees, and there were inforced to abide some three daies, some more, and some lesse, without any victuals at all, there suffring much colde besides many other calamities, and...through ever much hunger and cold, some of them fell down againe out of the Trees, and so were like to perish for want of succour. Othersame, sate in the tops of high Trees as aforesaid, beholding their wives, children, and servants, swimming (remediles of all succour) in the Waters. Other some sitting in the tops of Trees might behold their houses overflowne with the waters. some their houses caryed quite away: and no signe or token left there of them.

— "Gods warning to his people of England By the great over-flowing of the waters..." by William Jones, 1607

== Cause ==
The flooding is thought to have been caused by a high astronomical spring tide combined with severe weather, namely low atmospheric pressure bringing strong winds and a storm surge. The spring tide in the Bristol Channel on 30 January 1607 reached a height of 7.86 metres (25 ft 9 in). This occurred in combination with a severe south-westerly gale with peak winds measured at Barnstaple from 3am to noon, and coastal flooding in East Anglia at night on the 30th, both of which are consistent with a storm tracking eastwards. It has been demonstrated that the tide and weather event that occurred on this date were capable of generating a storm surge consistent with the observed inundation.

== Tsunami hypothesis ==
A 2002 research paper, following investigations by Professor Simon Haslett of Bath Spa University and Australian geologist Ted Bryant of the University of Wollongong, suggested that the flooding may have been caused by a tsunami, after the authors had read some eyewitness accounts in the historical reports which described the flood. The British Geological Survey has suggested that, as there is no evidence of a landslide off the continental shelf, a tsunami would most likely have been caused by an earthquake on a known unstable fault off the coast of southwest Ireland, causing the vertical displacement of the sea floor. One contemporary report describes an earth tremor on the morning of the flood; however, other sources date this earthquake to a few months after the event.

Haslett and Bryant's evidence for the tsunami hypothesis included massive boulders that had been displaced up the beach by enormous force; a layer up to 8 inches (20 cm) thick composed of sand, shells and stones within an otherwise constant deposit of mud that was found in boreholes from Devon to Gloucestershire and the Gower Peninsula; and rock erosion characteristic of high water velocities throughout the Severn Estuary. However, because of high wave energy conditions it is not methodologically possible to distinguish between storm and tsunami boulder deposits on North Atlantic coasts.

In attributing the flood to a storm surge in their 2006 paper, Horsburgh and Horritt show that those proposing a tsunami hypothesis underestimate the volume of water and coastal damage involved in storm surges, and fail to account for flooding on the opposite side of the country on the same day. There is also a lack of evidence for the event affecting West Wales, Cornwall, or southern Ireland. Their tsunami modelling showed that it would not be possible for a tsunami not to affect these areas, while causing flooding elsewhere in the country. Contemporary sources also indicate the flooding proceeded for a period of five hours, which is consistent with a storm surge rather than a tsunami.

== Future recurrence ==
The risk of coastal flooding is highlighted in the UK National Risk Register . While the risk of similar events in the foreseeable future is considered to be low, thanks to advances in defences and flood warning, it is estimated that the potential cost caused by comparable flooding to residential, commercial, industrial, and agricultural property could range from £7 billion to £13 billion at 2007 insured values. There has also been concern that the nuclear power stations at Hinkley Point and Oldbury could be endangered.

== Commemorations ==
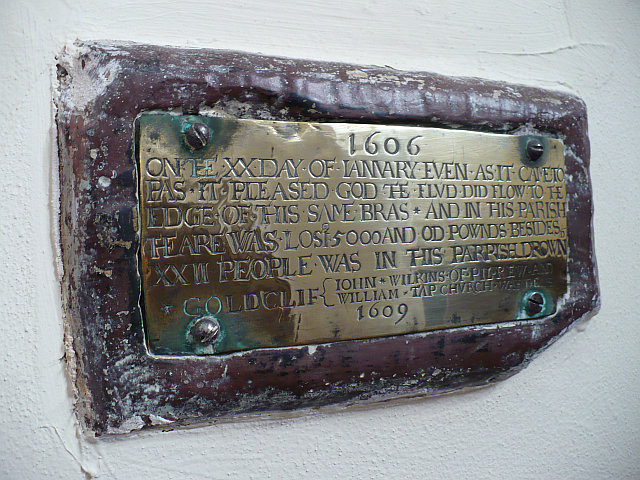
Flood plaque, in Church of St Mary Magdalene, Goldcliff, near Newport.

A number of commemorative plaques still remain, up to 8 feet (2.4 m) above sea level, showing how high the waters rose on the sides of surviving churches. The one inside the Church of St Mary Magdalene, Goldcliff, near Newport is a small brass plaque, inside on the north wall near the altar, today about 3 feet (0.9 m) above ground level, marking the height of the flood waters. The plaque records the year as 1606 because, under the Julian calendar in use at that time, the new year did not start until Lady Day, 25 March. The resultant financial loss in the parish was estimated as £5,000 (equivalent to £1.3 million in 2025).

The flood was commemorated in a contemporary pamphlet entitled God's warning to the people of England by the great overflowing of the waters or floods, by William Jones.

On the 400th anniversary, 30 January 2007, BBC for the Somerset area looked at the possible causes and asked whether it could happen again in the county. BBC Somerset Sound broadcast an anniversary programme and a special report was filed for BBC Points West.

== See also ==
- List of natural disasters in the United Kingdom
- List of disasters in Great Britain and Ireland by death toll
- List of deadliest tsunamis
- Geology of Great Britain
- Tsunamis affecting the British Isles
- 1999 Blayais Nuclear Power Plant flood
