= William de Goldcliff =

Bishop of Llandaff, Wales (died 1229)

- Bishop of Llandaff
- Church: Roman Catholic
- Diocese: Llandaff
- Elected: before 11 July 1219
- Installed: 1219
- Term ended: 1229
- Other post: Prior of Goldcliff Priory (c.1190–1219)

Orders
- Consecration: 27 October 1219

Personal details
- Died: 12 January 1229

William de Goldcliff (died 12 January 1229), was Bishop of Llandaff from 1219 until his death in 1229. He had formerly been the Prior of Goldcliff Priory from around 1190 to 1219. He was elected Bishop before 11 July 1219, and resigned from his position as Prior of Goldcliff. He received royal assent and the temporalities on 16 July, and was consecrated Bishop of Llandaff on 27 October. He died in office on 28 January 1229.
