= List of natural disasters in Ireland =

This is a list of natural disasters in Ireland.

Colour scheme used in this table:
Geological event
Cold weather event
Hot weather event
High winds event
Wet weather event
Famine
Sickness epidemic

Year	Disaster event	Notes; disaster type, people killed, region affected, etc.
70,000–75,000 ybp	Prolonged volcanic winter	Long lasting volcanic winters following the Toba catastrophe have been hypothesised to have killed every human not living in Africa at the time.
535–536	Extreme weather events of 535–536	The most severe cooling in the Northern Hemisphere in the last 2,000 years, likely caused crop failures and freezing for everyone in western Europe.
1315–17	Great Famine of 1315–1317	Throughout Europe.
1740	Irish Famine (1740–1741)	Somewhere between 310,000 and 480,000 people starve in Ireland due to cold weather affecting harvests.
1816–19	Typhus epidemic	Outbreak in Ireland.
1839	Night of the Big Wind	A European windstorm swept across Ireland causing hundreds of deaths and severe damage to property. Gusts were over 100 knots (190 km/h; 120 mph).
1840s	Great Famine (Ireland)	Starvation events. Killed over 400,000 people from starvation and disease.
1918–19	1918 flu pandemic	Worldwide influenza pandemic nicknamed The Spanish Flu.
1990–91	Winter of 1990–91	Periods of heavy snow and rainstorms lasting from December 1990 to February 1991 throughout Ireland and Western Europe.
2008	2008 Irish flash floods	Flash floods throughout August lead to one death and the destruction of 50 houses.
2009	2009 British Isles floods	Strong winds and heavy rain across the British Isles. Over 40,000 people in Cork were left without running water for a week, with 18,000 left without a supply for ten days. Many had to be rescued or evactuated from their homes.
2012	2012 British Isles floods	A series of low pressure systems steered by the jet stream bring the wettest April in 100 years, and flooding across Britain and Ireland. Continuing through May and leading to the wettest beginning to June in 150 years, with flooding and extreme events occurring periodically throughout parts of Western Europe.
2013	2013 British Isles heatwave	The heat wave indirectly caused 30 deaths by drowning.
2015	2015–16 British Isles floods	Flooding in Donegal, Connacht, Munster and the midlands caused millions of euro worth of damage. In Glaslough, County Monaghan, the dead body of a 70-year-old man was found when his car was believed to have become trapped in a dipped part of a flooded road.
2017	Hurricane Ophelia	During the autumn of 2017, Ireland was hit by Hurricane Ophelia, which had completed its transition into an extratropical cyclone shortly before its landfall in Ireland and subjected the island to hurricane-force winds. Three people were killed by fallen trees in Ireland and 22,000 people were left without electricity.
2018	2018 British Isles heatwave	Summer 2018 was the fifth hottest in the CET records back to 1659, with the period May–July being the hottest such period on record.
2020–	COVID-19 pandemic in the Republic of Ireland	Outbreak of SARS-CoV-2, originating in China, has caused over 188 million cases and more than 4 million deaths globally as of July 2021. In Ireland, it has resulted in 1,725,026 cases and 9,366 deaths.

== See also ==
- List of disasters in Great Britain and Ireland by death toll
- Geology of Ireland
- Tsunamis affecting the British Isles
