= Church of St Mary Magdalene, Goldcliff =

Coordinates: 51.5439°N 2.9168°W

St Mary Magdalene's Church, Goldcliff
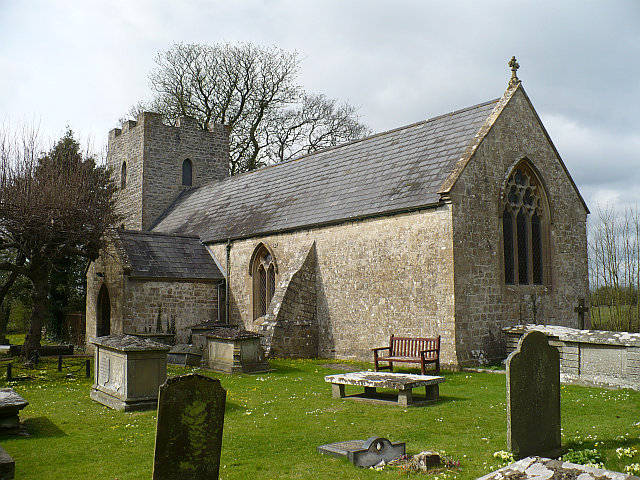

- Location in Newport
- OS grid reference: ST 365 831
- Location: Goldcliff, Newport
- Country: Wales
- Denomination: Church in Wales
- Website: Netherwent Ministry

History
- Status: Active

Architecture
- Functional status: Active
- Heritage designation: Grade II
- Designated: 1 March 1963
- Architectural type: Church

Specifications
- Materials: Stone, slate roof

St Mary Magdalene's Church stands in the village of Goldcliff, to the southeast of the city of Newport, Wales. An active parish church and a Grade II listed building, it is situated directly behind the Farmer's Arms public house.

== History ==
Cadw dates the church to the 12th century. It was rebuilt in the 14th century and afterwards, possibly using material from Goldcliff Priory after that was destroyed in a storm in 1424. (Note: The Living Levels website suggests that the earliest origins of the church may have been as a barn associated with Goldcliff Priory, and that the destruction of the priory in the 15th century saw the reconfiguration of the barn into a church. Odd pieces of decorative stonework, above the windows on the south, may have been taken from the ruins of the priory. The RCAHMW also notes that possibility.) The priory had been given to Eton College by Henry VI shortly after he had founded the school in 1440, and the connection between the church and the college continued into the early 20th century. (Note: The priory and parish records are held in the Eton College archives.)

The tower is probably an 18th- or 19th-century addition. It contains one bell, recast by Taylors of Loughborough in 1969. In the 19th century, the church was subject to an "austere" Victorian reconstruction.

The church contains a plaque, installed by the churchwardens in 1609, commemorating the losses, material and human, which occurred during the 1607 Bristol Channel floods. It also has a modest memorial to the three men of Goldcliff who died in the First World War. There is a medieval font with an 18th-century cover.

The church is described by local historian Fred Hando in his 1958 Out and About in Monmouthshire. He includes a sketch of the church, with its avenue of pollarded lime trees and notes that above the porch is a sundial inscribed "C.W. 1729".

St Mary Magdalene's is an active parish church within the Netherwent Ministry Area, which covers the area between Newport and Chepstow, from Portskewett and Sudbrook on the Severn Estuary in the east to Nash on the Gwent Levels in the west. Services are held fortnightly.

== Architecture and description ==
The Royal Commission on the Ancient and Historical Monuments of Wales echoes Cadw's description of the Victorian efforts, considering them an "austere" example of the Decorated Gothic Revival. The church is of stone with a slate roof. The battlemented tower is of three storeys. The church is a Grade II listed building. Its churchyard cross is a scheduled monument.

== Gallery ==
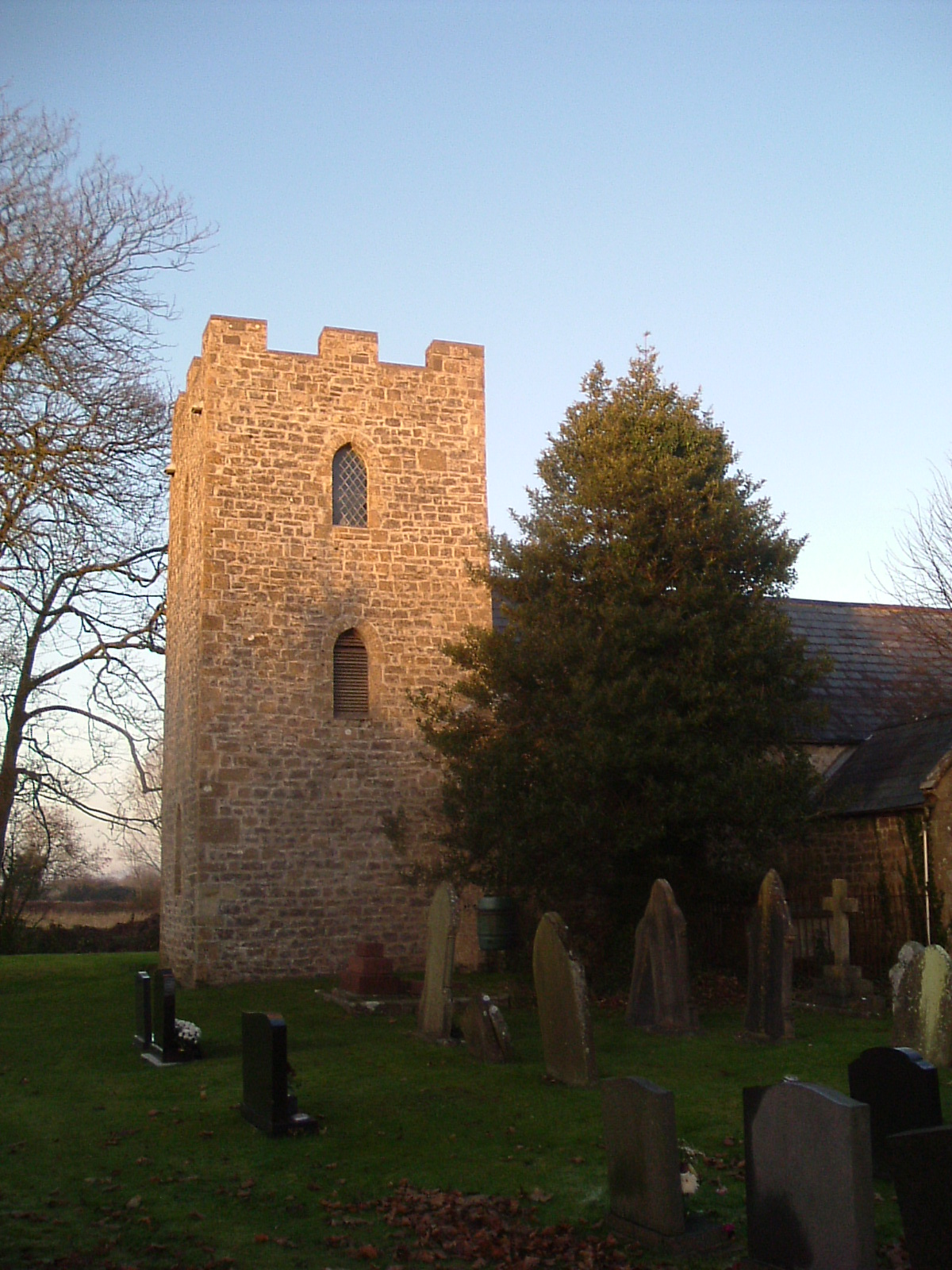
Church tower

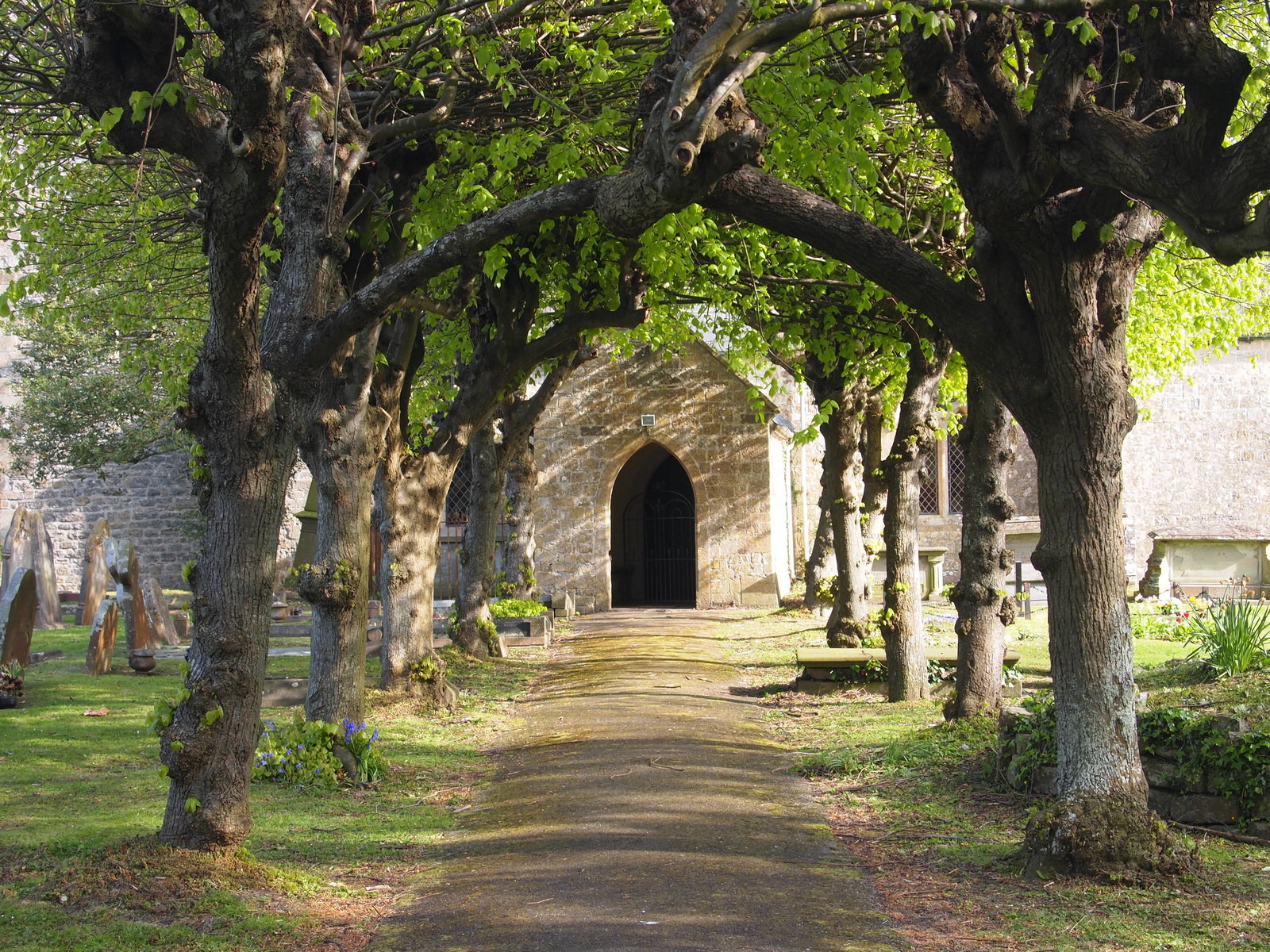
South Porch, with avenue of lime trees

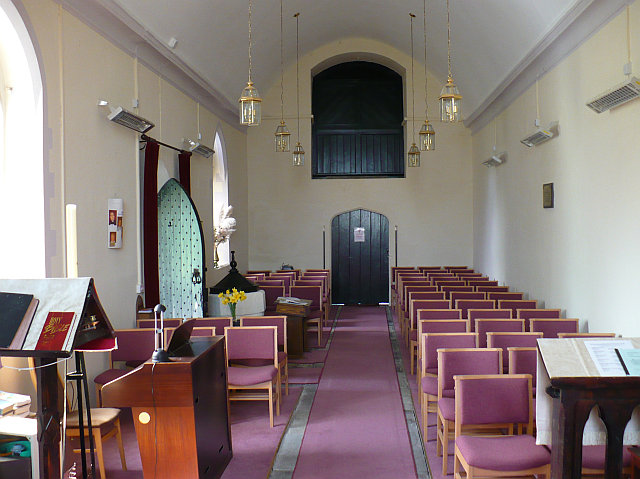
Church interior

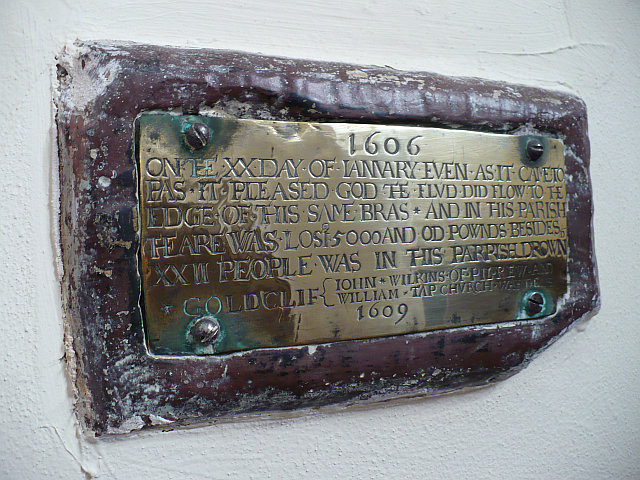
Brass plaque for the 1607 Great Flood
