= Dunwich =

Village in Suffolk, England

Coordinates: 52°16′39″N 1°37′52″E

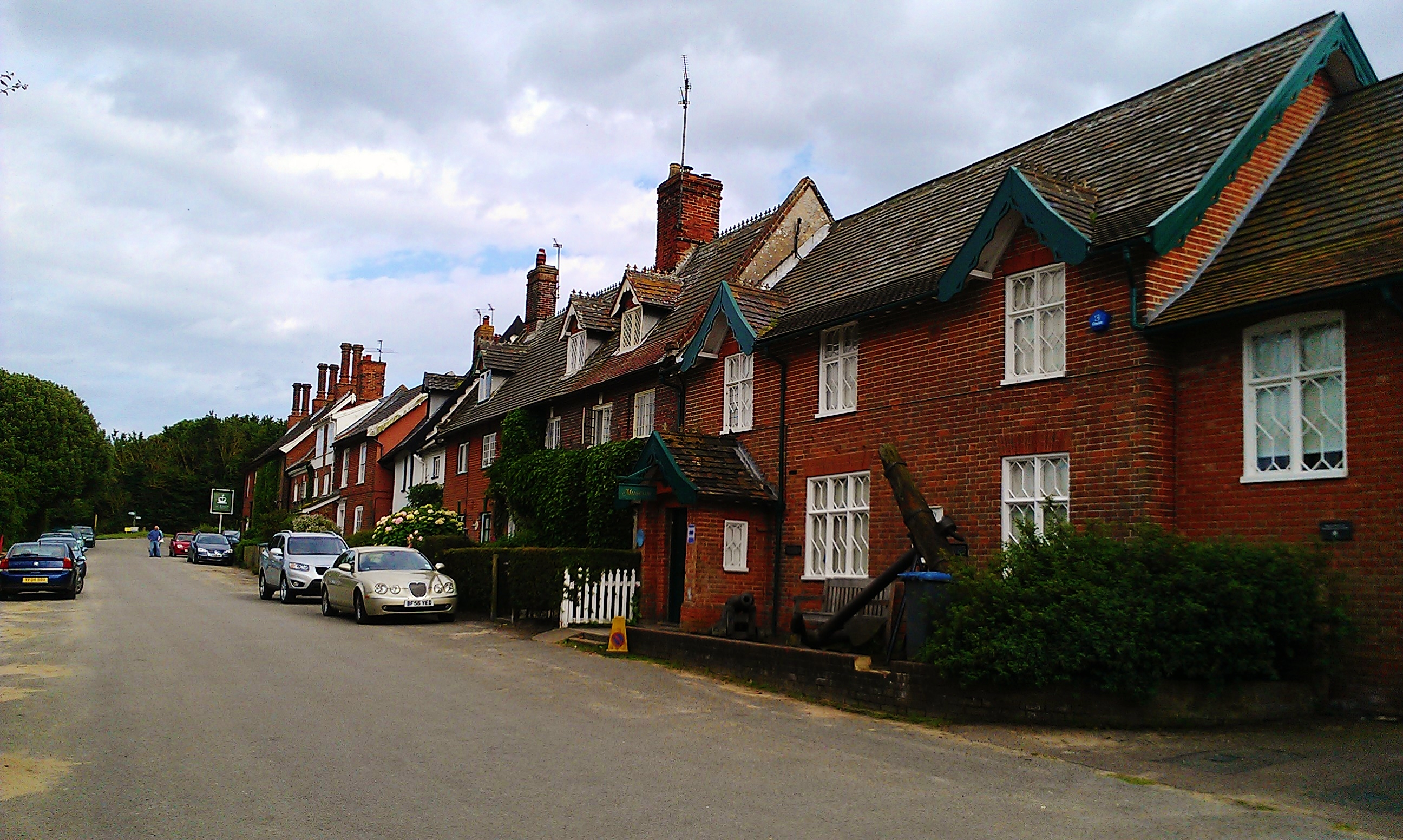
- Dunwich, view down St. James Street; to the right is the local museum

- Location within Suffolk
- Population: 189 (2021 census)
- OS grid reference: TM475705
- Civil parish: Dunwich
- District: East Suffolk
- Shire county: Suffolk
- Region: East
- Country: England
- Sovereign state: United Kingdom
- Post town: SAXMUNDHAM
- Postcode district: IP17
- Dialling code: 01728
- Police: Suffolk
- Fire: Suffolk
- Ambulance: East of England
- UK Parliament: Suffolk Coastal

Dunwich (/ˈdʌnɪtʃ/) is a village and civil parish in Suffolk, England. It is in the Suffolk & Essex Coast & Heaths National Landscape around 92 miles (148 km) north-east of London, 9 miles (14 km) south of Southwold and 7 miles (11 km) north of Leiston, on the North Sea coast.

In the Anglo-Saxon period, Dunwich was the capital of the Kingdom of the East Angles, but the harbour and most of the town have since disappeared due to coastal erosion. At its height it was an international port similar in area to 14th-century London (although much smaller in population). Its decline began in 1286 when a storm surge hit the East Anglian coast, followed by two great storms in February and December of 1287, until it eventually shrank to the village it is today. Dunwich is possibly connected with the lost Anglo-Saxon placename Dommoc.

The population of the civil parish at the 2001 census was 84, which increased to 183 according to the 2011 Census, though the area used by the Office of National Statistics for 2011 also includes part of the civil parish of Westleton. There is no parish council; instead there is a parish meeting.

== History ==
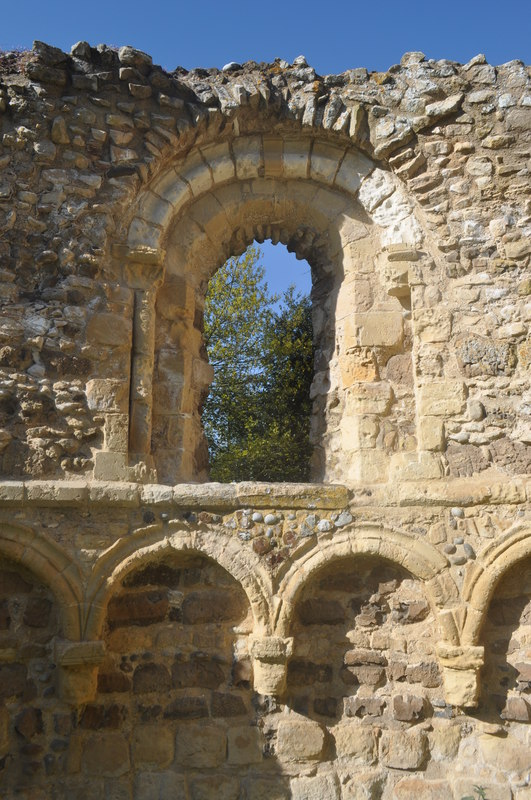
Former leper hospital, showing Romanesque window detail

Since the 15th century, Dunwich has frequently been identified with Dommoc – the original seat of the Anglo-Saxon bishops of the Kingdom of East Anglia established by Sigeberht of East Anglia for Saint Felix in c. 629–631. Dommoc was the seat of the bishops of Dommoc until around 870, when the East Anglian kingdom was taken over by the initially pagan Danes. The historian Rory Naismith refers to the bishopric of Dunwich, but Richard Hoggett locates Dommoc at Walton Castle.

The Domesday Book of 1086 describes Dunwich as possessing three churches. At that time it had an estimated population of 3,000.

On 1 January 1286, a storm surge reached the east edge of the town and destroyed buildings. Before that, most recorded damage to Dunwich was loss of land and damage to the harbour.

This was followed by two further surges the next year, the South England flood of February 1287 and St. Lucia's flood in December. There was a fierce storm on 14 January 1328. Another large storm in 1347 swept some 400 houses into the sea. The Grote Mandrenke around 16 January 1362 finally destroyed much of the remainder of the town.

Most of the buildings present in the 13th century have disappeared, including all eight churches, and Dunwich is now a small coastal village. The remains of a 13th-century Franciscan friary (Greyfriars) and the Leper Hospital of St James can still be seen. A popular local legend says that at certain tides church bells can still be heard from beneath the waves.

Characterizing the fate of the town as the loss of "a busy port to ... 14th-century storms that swept whole parishes into the sea" is inaccurate. It appears that the port developed as a sheltered harbour where the River Dunwich entered the North Sea. Coastal processes including storms caused the river to shift its mouth 2.5 miles (4 km) north to Walberswick, on the River Blyth. The town of Dunwich lost its raison d'être and was largely abandoned. Sea defences were not maintained and coastal erosion progressively denuded the town.

As a legacy of its previous significance, the parliamentary constituency of Dunwich retained the right to send two members to Parliament until the Reform Act 1832, and it was one of Britain's most notorious rotten boroughs. The town hall was lost to the sea, and the corporation moved to a cottage, which survives as the Old Town Hall.

By the mid-19th century, the population had dwindled to 237 inhabitants and Dunwich was described in 1844 as a "decayed and disfranchised borough". A new church, St James's, was built in 1832 after the abandonment of the last of the old churches, All Saints', which had been without a rector since 1755. All Saints' Church fell into the sea between 1904 and 1919, the last major portion of the tower succumbing on 12 November 1919. In 2005, historian Stuart Bacon stated that recent low tides had shown that shipbuilding had previously been undertaken in the town.

== Marine archaeology ==
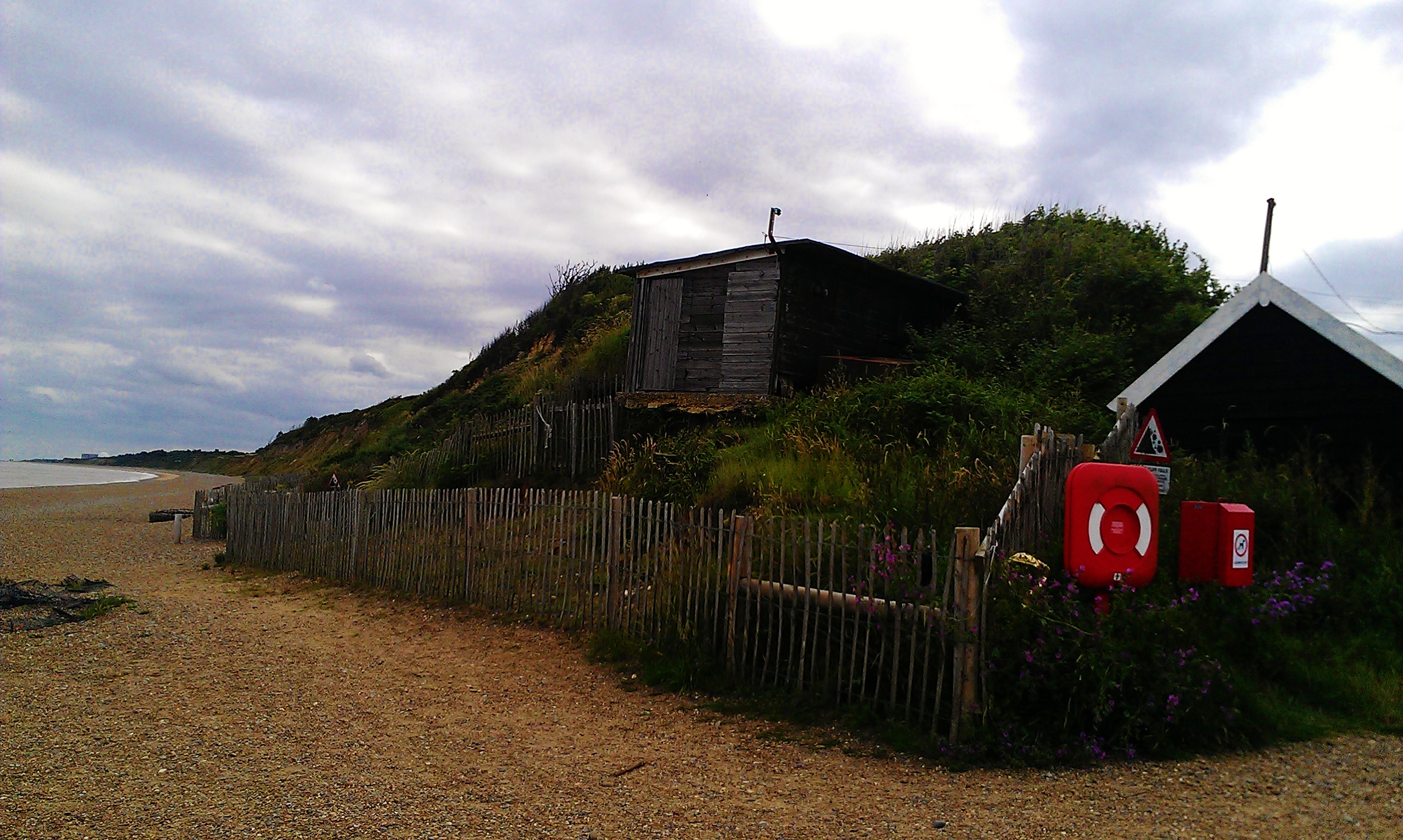
Beach at Dunwich

The Dunwich 2008 project funded by English Heritage and the Esmée Fairbairn Foundation was intended to collate all reliable historic mapped data on the same co-ordinate system and combine this with aerial photography and an underwater survey. New digital maps were produced by Prof. David Sear of Southampton University, marine archaeologist Stuart Bacon and the Geodata Institute. The survey also used multibeam and sidescan sonar to map the seafloor across the entire area of the town. These surveys identified a series of ruins that were confirmed by divers who recovered stones with lime mortar still attached. The lime mortar matched nearly perfectly with medieval mortar in existing churches on the coast. In 2009 Wessex Archaeology, working with Professor Sear, captured the highest resolution sidescan images of the town site including the ruins found in 2008. Further work in 2010 with BBC Oceans and the BBC One Show used novel acoustic imaging cameras (dual-frequency identification sonar – DIDSON) to film the ruins through the turbid water. These clearly showed the jumble of ruined blocks and worked stone associated with medieval church and chapel sites. A large survey and updating of the mapped data was commissioned by English Heritage in 2011 and reported in 2012. This compiled all previous survey data and enhanced the historical map and coastal pilot charts for the site. The results have produced the most comprehensive survey of the Dunwich town site – the largest medieval underwater site in Europe. Data from these surveys including maps and images explaining the different technologies are displayed in Dunwich Museum which is accredited by the Museum Archives Libraries Council. Details of Dunwich's 800-year battle to protect against coastal erosion are also displayed in the museum and it is hoped more work will be done in future. A database of references to Dunwich "designed to aid academic researchers, family historians and students" is available online.

In June 2011, at the invitation of Prof David Sear and the Dunwich Town Trust, the Anglo-Saxon and medieval archaeology of Dunwich was the subject of an episode of archaeological television programme Time Team.

Further work to explore new sites using DIDSON and diver surveys and a campaign of land-based archaeology is scheduled for 2013–2015 funded by the "Touching the Tide" Heritage Lottery Fund Landscape Partnership Scheme. This work hopes to confirm the date of the town ditches and roads and explore the record of environmental change in the marsh sediments. Altogether this work has identified the ruins of St Peter's and St Nicholas's churches, a chapel most probably St Katherine's, and ruins associated with Blackfriars friary and the town hall. The location of the Knight's Templar Church and All Saints' Church are known from the digital mapping but remain buried beneath an inner sandbank. The early town is buried under between 1 and 3 metres (9.8 ft) of sand to the east of the ruins found by Bacon and these later surveys. As a result, it was found that Dunwich had been a substantial port in Saxon times.

== Churches and other notable structures ==
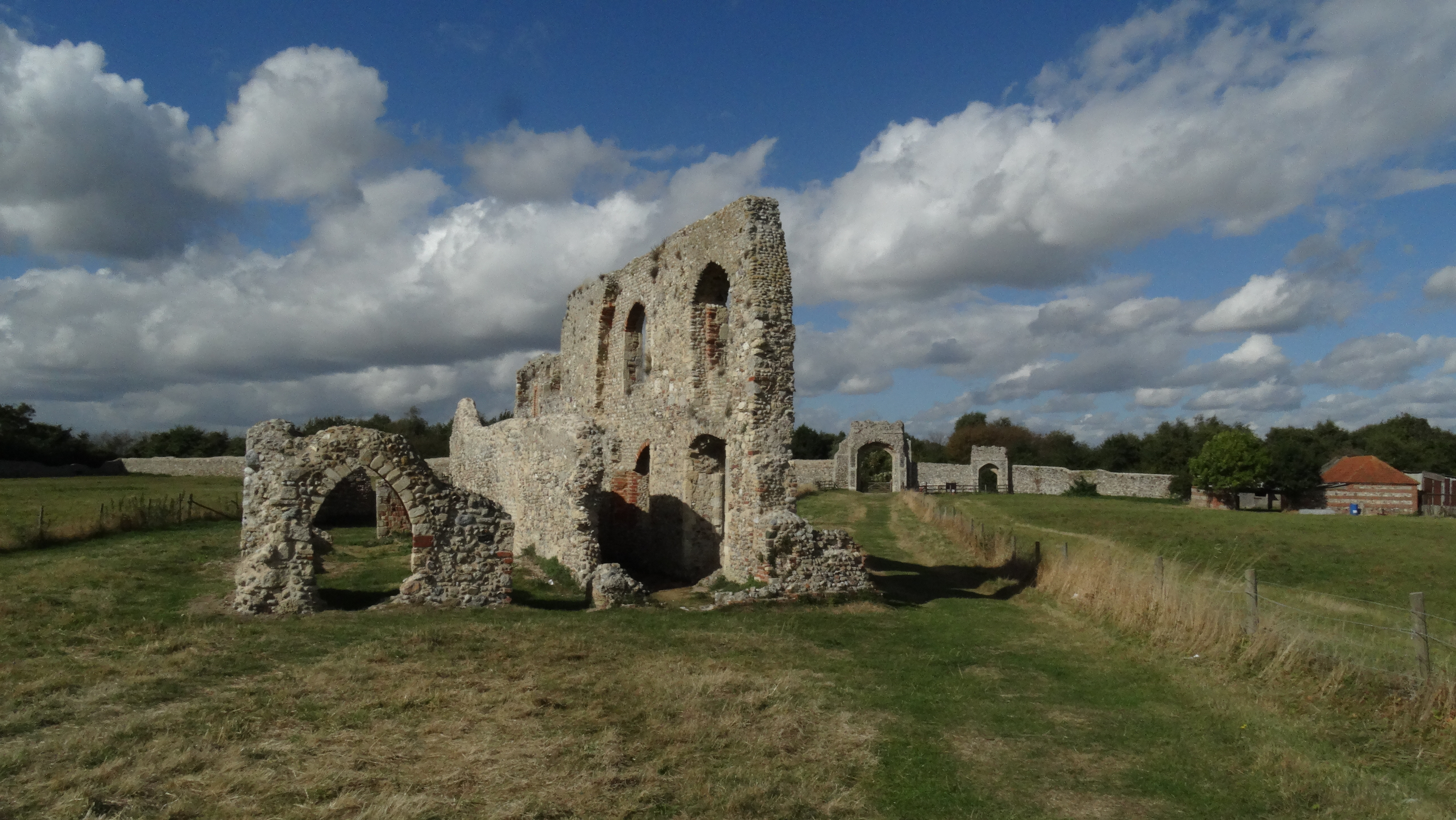
Remains of Greyfriars Priory

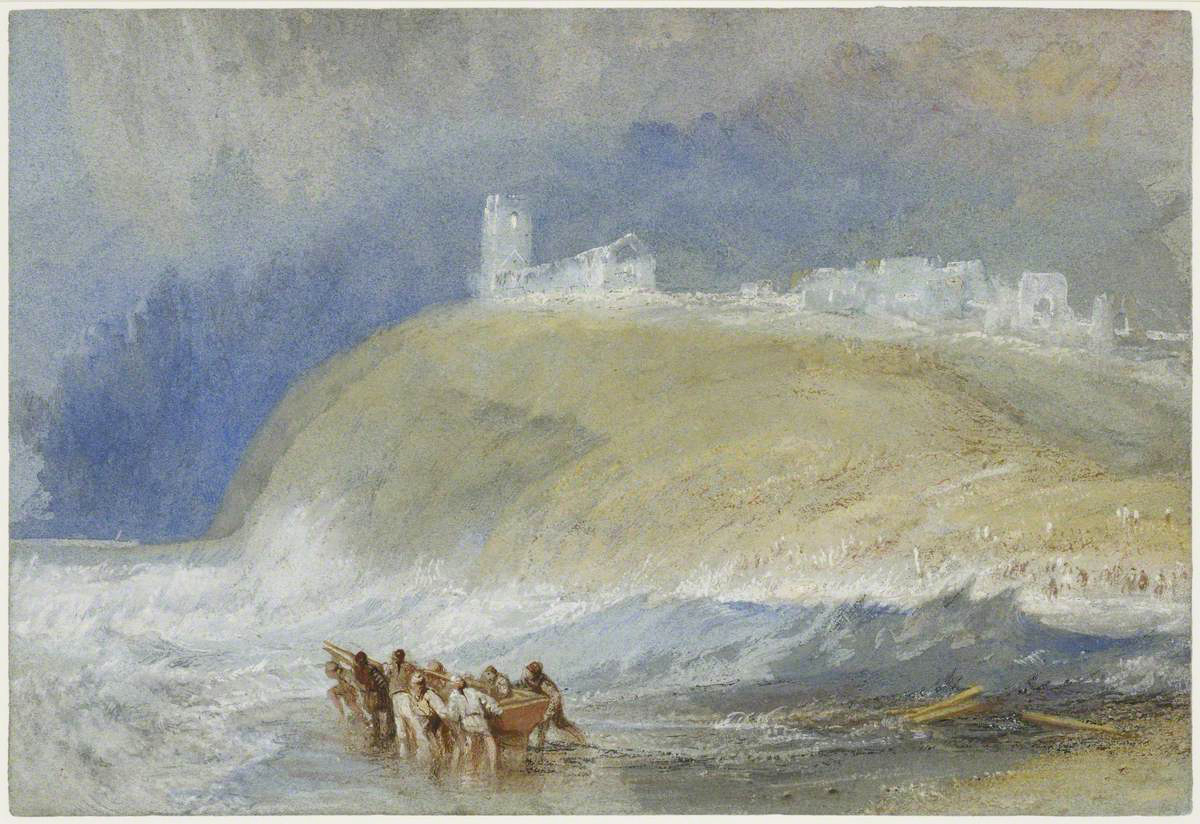
J. M. W. Turner's view of All Saints Church and Greyfriars Priory on the Dunwich headland, c. 1827

Though most of the religious buildings of the ancient port gradually subsided with the advance of the sea, they are survived to this day by the ruins of Greyfriars, a former Franciscan priory. Originally founded on a site nearer the sea, it was moved to its current position following the New Year storm of 1286, flourishing there until the Dissolution of the Monasteries in 1539. The grounds were enclosed by a stone wall, much of which remains, though often repaired. The most impressive structures still standing are part of the refectory and the 14th century gateway, which would once have been the main entrance to the monastic buildings.

Among the city's other religious foundations which have since been lost are the following:

- St Bartholomew's and St Michael's: both chapels of ease that had been built by the end of the 11th century.
- St Leonard's: a parish church that fell to the sea in the 14th century.
- St Nicholas's: a parish church with a cruciform building to the south of the city. Lost to the sea soon after the Black Death.
- St Martin's: a parish church built before 1175, it was lost to the sea between 1335 and 1408.
- St Francis Chapel: beside the Dunwich River, was lost in the 16th century.
- St Katherine's Chapel: in the parish of St John, lost in the 16th century.
- St John the Baptist's: a cruciform parish church, dismantled in the 1540s.
- Preceptory of the Knights Templar: thought to have been founded around 1189 and was a circular building similar to the famous Temple Church in London. The sheriff of Suffolk and Norfolk reported in his accounts of 1309 that he found the sum of £111, 14 shillings and sixpence farthing (£111-14s-6¼d) contained in four pouches – a vast sum that had been deposited with the Templars for safe keeping by Robert of Seffeld, parson of Brampton. In 1322, on the orders of Edward II implementing the papal bull Ad providam, all the Templars' land passed to the Knights Hospitallers. Following the suppression of the Hospitallers during the Dissolution of the Monasteries under Henry VIII, in 1562 the Temple was demolished. The foundations washed away during the reign of Charles I.
- St Peter's: a parish church similar in length to the church at nearby Blythburgh. It was stripped of anything of value as the cliff edge drew nearer. The east gable fell in 1688 and the rest of the building followed in 1697. The parish register survives and is now in the British Library.
- Blackfriars: Dominican priory in the southeast of the city. It was founded during the time of Henry III by Roger Holish. By 1385 preparations were made for the Dominicans to move to nearby Blythburgh as the sea drew nearer, although prematurely, as the priory remained active and above sea level until at least the Dissolution of the Monasteries under Henry VIII. The last building fell to the sea in 1717.
- All Saints' Church: a parish church, last of Dunwich's ancient churches to be lost to the sea. It was abandoned in the 1750s after its flint and freestone structure had become dilapidated and public services were celebrated only fortnightly and then monthly. It was then decided the parishioners could no longer afford the upkeep, although burials occurred in the churchyard until the 1820s. Stages of the building's gradual decay can be found in the 1776 print by W. Watts, the 1813 hand-tinted print by J. P. Neale and the 1904 oil painting by Thomas Lingwood (1859–1924). Beside these topographical exercises, more artistic views were painted in the building's final century. J. M. W. Turner's watercolour of about 1827 is set at beach level, with a group of seamen struggling to launch a boat through the turbulent waves. On the headland in the upper half can be seen the spectral ruins of All Saints, with those of Greyfriars further back. The later watercolour by John Nash dates from 1919 and looks along the eroding headlands into the distance. Bathers are in the foreground with, above them, the buttressed tower of the church. Reversing the perspective in the same year, Edward Vulliamy (1876-1962) looks downwards through a doorway in the tower to where its shadow is thrown on the beach below, where its last remnant is soon to join the shingle.

The cliff edge reached All Saints in 1904 and the tower (at its west end) fell in 1922. One of the tower buttresses was salvaged and now stands in the current Victorian-era St James' Church. One of the last remaining gravestones, in memory of John Brinkley Easey, fell over the cliff in the early 1990s. A large block of masonry could still be seen at the water's edge at low tide in 1971. In 2022, only one gravestone (in memory of Jacob Forster who died in the late 18th century) remained, about 15 feet (4.6 m) from the cliff edge.

== Dunwich during World War II ==
Sited on Dunwich Heath during the Second World War, RAF Dunwich was one of the Chain Home Low stations which provided low-level radar cover for the central East Anglian coast. This stretch was also used by the military to simulate the Normandy landings of 1944 in what was named Operation Kruschen a year earlier. Also present was the official war artist Edward Bawden, who made coloured sketches of the exercise. Impressed by the area, he returned in 1948 to make further paintings.

== Folklore ==
The Dark Heart of Dunwich is piece of a Suffolk folklore, the origins of which appear to lie in the twelfth century. The legend tells of how Eva, a Dunwich maiden due to be married to the son of a local landowner, fell instead for a good-looking local cad, who had his way with her and then deserted her, running off to sea. After waiting in vain for her lost love to return, she cut out her heart and hurled it into the sea. However, according to the legend, she was unable to die, and still haunts the area, particularly around the (constantly shifting) beach, where the land meets the sea. The heart itself, said to be similar in appearance to a wooden heart, is believed to wash up occasionally and bring great misfortune to anyone who picks it up and keeps it.

== Cultural references ==
=== Poetry ===
The first literary reference to Dunwich is in the rhyming chronicle of Jordan Fantosme, written in Norman French in the twelfth century. This describes the unsuccessful siege of the city in 1173 by Robert de Beaumont, 3rd Earl of Leicester, as part of the revolt against Henry II. A later, more successful sea battle is described in a popular song as viewed from "Dunwich Hill". This was the Battle of Solebay between the English and Dutch fleets in 1672, during the Third Anglo-Dutch War.

Following the massive erosion of the once impressive city, Dunwich became, in the words of one gazetteer, a "place of sightseers who come not to see what it is but to muse on what has been". The typical reaction is that of James Bird (1788-1839), whose 4-canto "Dunwich: A Tale of the Splendid City" opens with the lament:

There stood the City in its pride - ’tis gone –
Mocked at by crumbling pile, and mouldering stone,
And shapeless masses, which the reckless power
Of time hath hurled from ruined arch and tower!
O'er the lone spot, where shrines and pillared walls
Once gorgeous shone, the clammy lizard crawls;
O'er the lone spot where yawned the guarded fosse,
Creeps the wild bramble and the spreading moss.

Similar meditations on transience among its ruins followed in Bernard Barton's "Dunwich", from his collection Napoleon and Other Poems (1822), and in the seven sections of Algernon Charles Swinburne's By the North Sea, picturing the view there as encompassing "A land that is lonelier than ruin,/A sea that is stranger than death". The poem's sixth section evokes the deterioration of All Saints Church and the collapse of its graveyard into the sea, in order to take an agnostic overview of old Christian certainties. Henry Dell's "Dunwich in Suffolk" also pictures the site in much the same terms.

In the 20th century, poets bracketed the themes of physical and personal erosion as part of their response. They include Ethel Wynne Candwell's "Dunwich" (1928), Anthony Thwaite's "At Dunwich", and Wendy Mulford's avant-garde documentary, The East Anglia Sequence (1998), based on Salthouse, Norfolk, as well as Dunwich.

=== Fiction ===
Two historical novels featured the Dunwich area. In William De Morgan's An Affair of Dishonour (1910), the Battle of Solebay is viewed from the shore by characters living at a manor house said to be remote "since the sea swallowed up the township of which it was a suburb". The novel Red Eve (1911) by H. Rider Haggard has several scenes set in the fourteenth century city. The title character, Eve Clavering, is a member of a Dunwich family whose properties have been partly destroyed by the sea. In two later novels the desolate area sets the scene for P. D. James's Unnatural Causes (1967) and is visited by the author of the second in the course of a walking tour of Suffolk in W. G. Sebald's 1995 novel The Rings of Saturn.

=== Musical ===
There have also been musical attempts to recreate the feeling of nostalgia and erosion evoked by the site, such as in the last track on Brian Eno's 1982 album Ambient 4: On Land, which merges layers of synthesized sound to construct the atmosphere of Dunwich Beach, Autumn, 1960. Commenting on this later, Adam Harper characterizes all the albums as "not so much music for the background as the music of the background, the experience of place at the edge of attention and how it mediates or redirects thought".

In some lines of his 2007 song "The Coldest Winter in Memory", Al Stewart refers to local folklore already mentioned.

By the lost town of Dunwich the shore was washed away
They say you hear the church bells still as they toll beneath the waves

At about the same time, the British Progressive Rock band The Future Kings of England signalled their Suffolk roots in some of their titles, including the soundscape of Dunwich from their 2007 album The Fate of Old Mother Orvis.

== See also ==
- Lost city
- Covehithe
- Easton Bavents
- Rungholt and Ravenser Odd
- Dunwich, Australia
- Bishop of Dunwich

== Sources ==
- Durham, Andrew, Corbett, Sarah, Dunwich: A ghost story (page 5)
- Parker, Rowland (1978). Men of Dunwich. Alastair Press. ISBN 1-870567-85-4.
- Cooper, Ernest Read (1948). Memories of Bygone Dunwich. Southwold: F. Jenkins.
