= Tsunamis affecting the British Isles =

Tsunamis affecting Britain and Ireland are extremely uncommon but happened in 2011 and there have only been two confirmed cases in recorded history. Meteotsunamis (displacements due to atmospheric pressure, rather than seismic shock) are somewhat more common, especially on the southern coasts of England around the English and Bristol Channels.

== Confirmed tsunamis ==
=== Scotland (6100 BC) ===
The east coast of Scotland was struck by a 21 m (70 ft) high tsunami around 6100 BC, during the Mesolithic period. The wave was caused by the massive underwater Storegga slide off Norway. The tsunami even washed over some of the Shetland Islands. Tsunamite (the deposits left by a tsunami) dating from this event can be found at various locations around the coastal areas of Scotland, and are also a tourist feature in the Montrose Basin, where there is a layer of deposited sand about 0.6 metres (2 ft) thick.

At the time, what became the east coast of England was connected to the areas of Denmark and the Netherlands by a low-lying land bridge, now known to archaeologists as Doggerland. The area is believed to have had a coastline of lagoons, marshes, mudflats, and beaches, and may have been the richest hunting, fowling, and fishing ground in Europe at the time. Much of this land would have been inundated by the tsunami, with a catastrophic impact on the local human population.

=== Lisbon earthquake (1755) ===
The coast of Cornwall was hit by a 3 m (10 ft) high tsunami on 1 November 1755, at around 14:00. The waves were caused by the 1755 Lisbon earthquake. The tsunami took almost four hours to reach the UK. The tsunami was also observed along the south coast of England and on the River Thames in London. Contemporary reports say that there were three of these tsunami waves, and that the sea receded very quickly, then rose up. At St Michael's Mount, the sea rose suddenly and then retired; ten minutes later, it rose 6 feet (1.8 m) very rapidly, then ebbed equally rapidly. The sea rose 8 feet (2.4 m) in Penzance and 10 feet (3.0 m) at Newlyn; the same effect was reported at St Ives and Hayle. Although there is no record of the overall death toll, the 19th-century French writer Arnold Boscowitz claimed that "great loss of life and property occurred upon the coasts of Cornwall".

The tsunami also reached Galway in Ireland, at a height of 2 m (6.6 ft), and caused some serious damage to the "Spanish Arch" section of the city wall.

There are also historical records of the tsunami reaching Pembrokeshire and washing up the Cleddau estuary.

=== Lisbon earthquake (1761) ===
At Mount's Bay in Cornwall, a small tsunami up to 1.9 meters was observed following the 1761 Portugal earthquake.

=== Meteotsunami (1929) ===
On 20 July 1929 a wave reported as being between 3.5 and 6 m (11 and 20 ft) high struck the south coast of England including busy tourist beaches at Worthing, Brighton, Hastings and Folkestone. Two people drowned and the wave was attributed to a squall line travelling along the English Channel.

=== South coast (2011) ===
A small tsunami in the English Channel with a peak wave height anomaly of 40 cm (16 in) occurred on 29 June 2011 affecting four counties on the south coast of England; Cornwall, Devon, Dorset and Hampshire. The tsunami was described as mild and there were no records of injuries or damage. Video footage clearly showed the tsunami and there were reports of fish leaping out the water and hair lifting up because of a static charge. Initial media speculation attributed the event to an underwater landslide, as no earthquakes were recorded at the time. However, the British Geological Survey concluded that it was unlikely to have been caused by a submarine landslide and was probably a meteotsunami.

== Possible tsunamis ==
=== Orkney and Shetland (3500 BC) ===
Traces of a tsunami called the Garth tsunami have been reported from the Shetland Islands. The tsunami took place 5,500 years ago and may be connected to the presence of mass burials on both the Shetland and Orkney islands.

=== England and Wales (1014) ===
A widespread flood was reported in the Anglo-Saxon Chronicle to have occurred in Britain, from the coast of Cumbria to Kent, on 28 September 1014. William of Malmesbury stated that "A tidal wave... grew to an astonishing size such as the memory of man cannot parallel, so as to submerge villages many miles inland and overwhelm and drown their inhabitants." The event was also mentioned in Welsh bardic chronicles. Accounts suggest that a flood affected Kent, Sussex, Hampshire, Cumbria, and Mount's Bay in Cornwall, where the Bay was "inundated by a 'mickle seaflood' when many towns and people were drowned".

=== Dover Straits earthquake (1580) ===
On 6 April 1580 there was a 5.8 magnitude earthquake with its epicentre on the sea bed close to Calais. Giant waves were reported, and hundreds of people were killed when ships were sunk by the waves and the low-lying coastal land around Calais was inundated by the sea. In Dover, part of the chalk cliff collapsed, taking with it part of Dover Castle. A contemporary French account states: "in the city of Calais such a horrible and terrible earthquake came to pass that a great part of the houses fell, and even the sea overflowed into the city and did ruin and drown a great number of houses, and numerous persons perished, and a great multitude of beasts lost which were at pasture outside this city." In recent years, it has been suggested that these waves were a tsunami and not seiches. It is unlikely that the earthquake alone was strong enough to rupture the sea bed to trigger a tsunami, but it appears to have been sufficiently powerful to have caused an undersea landslide that was capable of generating a tsunami, as happened in Papua New Guinea in 1998, killing around 2,500 people.

=== Bristol Channel (1607) ===
The 1607 Bristol Channel floods are attributed to a storm surge, but some have suggested that it was a tsunami caused by an earthquake or a landslide from the Irish coast.

=== North Sea (1858) ===
A tsunami was reported by witnesses in England, Germany, the Netherlands and Denmark on 5 June 1858. A witness stated that at 09:15, the sea in Pegwell Bay, East Kent, "suddenly receded about 200 yards (180 m) and returned to its former position within the space of about 20 minutes". The Times reported severe thunderstorms and flooding in the west of England on the same day. Due to the weather conditions, it may have been a meteotsunami.

== Future tsunamis ==
In the 1990s, geologists realised that the Cumbre Vieja volcano in La Palma, in the Canary Islands off North Africa, could pose a tsunami risk to Britain and Ireland, as it is seemingly unstable. They concluded that a future volcanic eruption will result in the mass of rock alongside the volcanoes breaking off and falling into the sea as a massive landslide. This in turn will generate a huge tsunami, which will surge into the Atlantic Ocean and hit Spain, Portugal, the east coast of the United States, France, the southern and western parts of Ireland and the south coast of England. It is estimated that the waves will take around 6 hours to reach the British Isles, and that when they do they will be around 10 metres (30 ft) high. Britain would be badly hit, and it is believed by some that if nothing is done, thousands of lives will be lost. There is considerable controversy about the accuracy of these predictions. Researchers at Delft University of Technology in the Netherlands found the island to be much more stable than was widely believed, estimating that it would take at least another 10,000 years for the island to grow enough for there to be a danger.

== See also ==
- List of earthquakes in the British Isles
- List of natural disasters in the British Isles

== Notes ==
=== References ===
- "Tsunamis". National Maritime Museum.
- "Tsunami theory of flood disaster: Bristol Channel". BBC News. 4 April 2005.
- "Tsunami waves wiped out prehistoric Scottish communities". New Scientist. 4 August 1990.
- "Scientists warn of massive wave". CNN. 29 August 2001.
- "Tidal wave threat 'over-hyped': Canary islands". BBC News. 29 October 2004.
- "2060: Tsunami horror hits Britain". Independent on Sunday. 5 November 2006. Archived from the original on 5 December 2008.
