= South England flood of February 1287 =

Storm surge on southern coast of England

The coastline before the storm of 1287. The modern coastline is shown with dashed lines.

In February 1287 a storm hit the southern coast of England with such ferocity that whole areas of coastline were redrawn. Silting up and cliff collapses led to towns that had stood by the sea finding themselves landlocked, while others that had been inland found themselves with access to the sea.

The town of Winchelsea on Romney Marsh was destroyed (later rebuilt on the clifftop behind). Nearby Broomhill was also destroyed. The course of the nearby River Rother was diverted away from New Romney, which was almost destroyed and left a mile from the coast, ending its role as a port. The Rother ran instead to sea at Rye, prompting its rise as a port. The storm contributed to the collapse of a cliff at Hastings, taking part of Hastings Castle with it, blocking the harbour and ending its role as a trade centre, though it continued as a centre for fishing. Whitstable in Kent is also reported to have been hit by the surge.

In all, the storm can be seen to have had a powerful effect on the Cinque Ports, two of which were hit (Hastings and New Romney), along with the supporting "Antient Town" of Winchelsea. Meanwhile, the other Ancient Town of Rye was advantaged.

This was one of two huge storms to strike England in 1287. The other, known in the Netherlands as St. Lucia's flood, struck in December, the following winter. Together with a surge on 1 January 1286, they seem to have prompted the decline of one of England's then-leading ports, Dunwich in Suffolk.

== See also ==
- Saxon Shore Way
