= Goldcliff Priory =

Benedictine monastery in Wales

Coordinates: 51.5334°N 2.9072°W

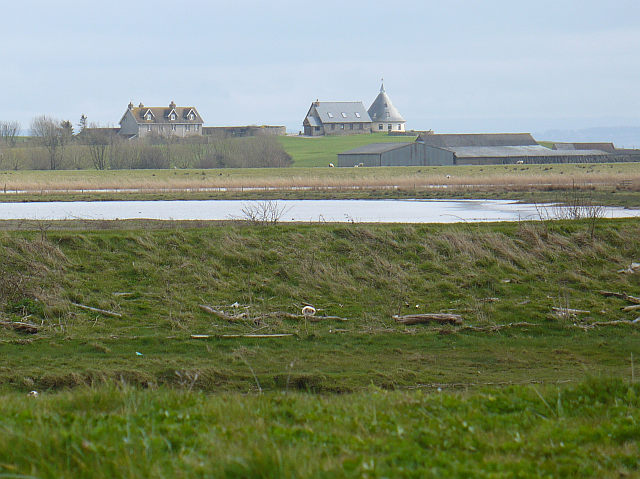
View toward the Bristol Channel at Goldcliff, with the site of Goldcliff Priory (Hill Farm house and outbuildings) in the distance

Goldcliff Priory was a Benedictine monastery in Goldcliff, near Newport, South Wales. It was established in 1113 by Robert de Chandos as a subsidiary house of the Abbey of Bec in Normandy. The priory was built on a coastal site, now the land of Hill Farm. In the 1950s, the Monmouthshire writer Hando noted the outlines of buildings visible as grass patterns or crop marks, but by the 1970s the only remaining structural element was part of a cellar in the farm house.

Royal Commission aerial photography in 2010 found evidence of the foundations of a large structure consisting of a central block with wings, measuring 37 metres (121 ft) by 11 metres (36 ft), and set adjacent to a bivallate earthwork enclosure.

== History ==
In 1113 Robert de Chandos endowed his new priory with the manor of Monksilver, near Williton in Somerset. The manor was originally called Silver, but was later termed Silver Monachorum or Monksilver because of its ownership by the priory.

Robert de Chandos's son, also Robert, died in 1120 and was buried in the Church of St Mary Magdalene, Goldcliff. By the 13th century, the priory housed 25 monks. Untypically, the monks wore white habits, unlike the usual black attire favoured by the Benedictines. In 1322 the prior at Goldcliff was William de Saint Albin. A series of medieval charters exist, as do accounts of the drainage system developed. Fred Hando recorded that 20th-century farmers in the area ascribed the land reclamation and the building of the "Monksditch" to the priory. In 1334 the prior Phillip Gopillarius ("Philip de Gopylers") was charged, along with other clergy and laymen from the area, with stealing the cargo from a vessel wrecked at Goldcliff.

Henry VI granted the patronage of the priory to Henry Earl of Warwick, with licence to appropriate it to Tewkesbury Abbey and in 1442 it was made a cell of Tewkesbury. At this time the priory's estates were worth £200 a year. In 1445 the three monks of Tewkesbury were expelled from Goldcliff by the Welsh, though it was regained in 1447. In 1450 Henry VI gifted the priory to Eton College.

At the Dissolution of the Monasteries, full ownership of the parish was vested in the college which retained ownership until the early 20th century. The priory records are held in the college archives.

== Priors of Goldcliff ==
- William de Goldcliff, c. 1190–1219 (Bishop of Llandaff 1219–29, his death)
- Henry, 1248–1248
- Maurice, 1263
- Jean de Plessis, 1265 (becomes prior of Bec, dies shortly afterwards)
- Walter, 1295
- Osbert, 1297–1313
- Ralph de Runceville, 1313–1318
- William de St Albino, 1319–1397
- Philip de Gopylers, 1328–1334 (William Martel intrudes in 1332)
- Thomas Leonc, 1334–1336 (relieved in 1336)
- William de St Albino, 1336–1349 (relieved in 1349)
- Bertand Maheil, 1349–1352 (removed by Abbot of Bec)
- William de St. Vedast, 1352–1357 (had keeping of Ogbourne Priory, 1399)
- German de St. Vedast, 1369–1418
- Lawrence de Bonneville, 1418–1441
- John Twining, 1441–1442 (monk of St Peter's, Gloucester)
- Hugh Morainville, 1445–1447 (uncertain)
