= St. Lucia's flood =

Storm tide that affected the Netherlands and Northern Germany in 1287

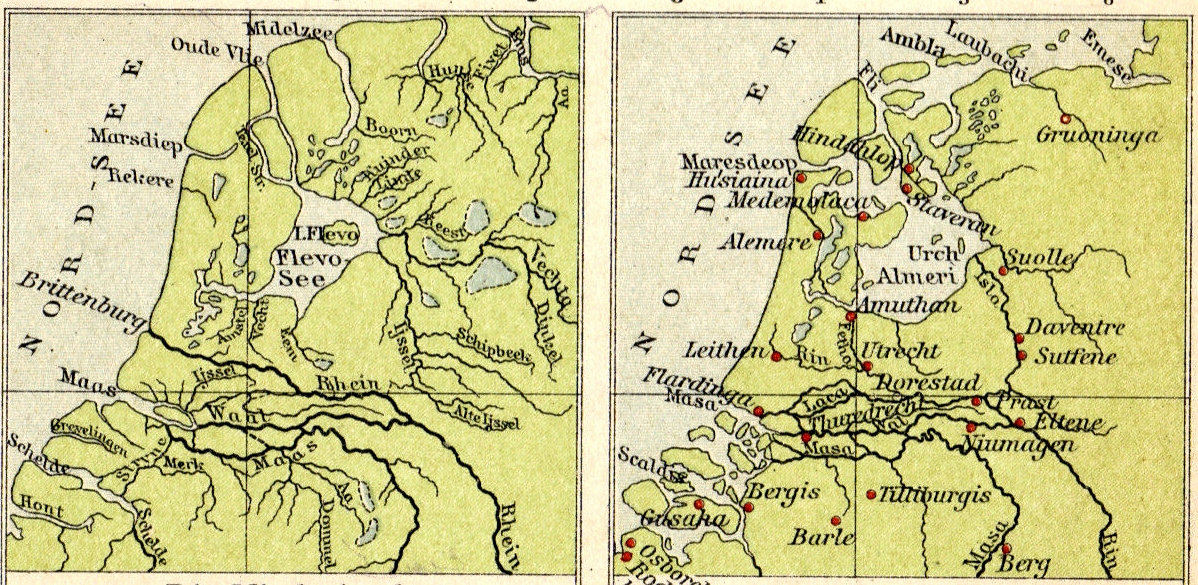
Maps of North Holland, 1st-10th century.

St. Lucia's flood (Sint-Luciavloed) was a storm tide that affected the Low Countries on 13/14 December 1287 (OS), St. Lucia Day and the day after, killing approximately 50,000 to 80,000 people in one of the largest floods in recorded history. A low-pressure system combined with a high tide caused the North Sea to rise over seawalls and dykes, causing a large portion of the region to be flooded.

== Description ==
This disaster was similar to the North Sea flood of 1953, when an intense European windstorm coinciding with a high tide caused a huge storm surge. The St. Lucia flood had a major influence on the subsequent history of the Netherlands. As a result of this event, a large percentage of the region's population was killed.

The island of Griend in the Wadden Sea experienced serious destruction, with only ten houses left standing. After the flood, Harlingen, about 25 kilometres southeast of Griend and formerly landlocked, became a new major seaport of Friesland, a role it kept for seven centuries.

The only part of the current northwestern Netherlands—apart from the western dunes area (the old Dutch heartland) and the Frisian Islands—that escaped annihilation was West-Friesland, because this area was already protected by a ringdike that mostly held. Soon after the St. Lucia Day disaster, West-Frisia, now separated from the rest of Friesland by a strait of around 15 kilometres at its narrowest, was annexed by the county of Holland, expanding this county northwards. The flood also brought to an end the Friso-Hollandic Wars, which had lasted about 200 years. Soon after this annexation, the West-Frisian cities of Hoorn and Enkhuizen began a rise to prominence that would last until the 17th century.

=== In Germany (mostly East Frisia) ===
Chronicles tell of 50,000 people killed and total destruction. Many villages disappeared forever. In the district of East Frisia, 30 villages were completely demolished. Also a first stage of the Dollart came into existence. Because of the large loss of land and the relative insecurity of living in the now far more unprotected peatlands, since natural barriers had been removed by the flood, many survivors abandoned their ways of living in the fertile peatlands and relocated to the Geest.

=== In England ===
Although not known by the name of St. Lucia, the same storm also had devastating effects on the other side of the North Sea in England. It killed hundreds of people in England, e.g. in the village of Hickling, Norfolk, where 180 people died and the water rose a foot above the high altar in the Priory Church.

The storm is one of two in 1287 referred to sometimes as a "Great Storm". The other was the earlier South England flood of February 1287. Together with a surge in January 1286, they seem to have prompted the decrepitude of one of England's then major ports, Dunwich in Suffolk.

== See also ==
- Floods in the Netherlands
