= Stoke-by-Clare Priory =

Benedictine monastery in Suffolk, England

Stoke-by-Clare Priory was a Benedictine monastery in Stoke-by-Clare, in Suffolk, an alien priory, dependent on Bec Abbey, in Normandy. Reinstituted in 1124, the Priory was suppressed in 1415.

== Anglo-Saxon monastery ==
Earl Alfric, who lived in the reigns of Kings Cnut (Canute), Harold Harefoot, Harthacnut and Edward the Confessor (1016–1066), founded the church or chapel of St. John Baptist in or at Clare Castle and established there seven secular canons.

== Refoundations ==
This earlier church, with all its endowments, was given in 1090 by Gilbert Fitz Richard de Clare to the Benedictine Bec Abbey in Normandy, of which it became a cell. In 1124 his son Richard de Clare, 3rd Lord of Clare (sometimes called Earl of Hereford), moved the monastic community from Clare Castle to Stoke-by-Clare, in Suffolk, located in the valley of the River Stour, about two miles west of Clare.

== Dependency of Bec Abbey ==
From 1090 and for the rest of its monastic existence, the Priory was a dependency of Bec Abbey, a Benedictine monastic foundation in Normandy, not far from Rouen. Founded in 1034, it became through the magnetic presence of the erudite Lanfranc of Pavia a focus of 11th century intellectual life, which developed further under its second abbot, Anselm. Both Lanfranc and Anselm were considerable international figures and both became in turn Archbishop of Canterbury. So it was that Bec became the most influential monastic centre of the 12th-century Anglo-Norman kingdom. Many of the companions in arms and followers of William the Conqueror supported Bec Abbey, enriching it with extensive properties in England, where Bec possessed in the 15th century several priories, namely, in addition to Stoke-by-Clare, also St Neots, Wilsford, Steventon, Cowick, Ogbourne, and at some point also Blakenham Priory and Povington Priory. Bec also had Goldcliff Priory in Monmouthshire. The London suburb of Tooting Bec takes its name from the medieval village having been a possession of Bec Abbey.

== An uncertain existence ==
Stoke-by-Clare Priory, as an alien priory, remained down the years in an uneasy situation in the eyes of the English crown. Repeatedly, not least during the Hundred Years' War, the priory's revenues were wholly or in part diverted to the English crown.

Among other grants, the priory received the right to hold a Thursday market at Stoke, and a yearly fair of three days at the feast of St John the Baptist. From the founding family, the monks had received, in addition to lands, mills, fishing, and pasturing rights, and the advowsons of over ten churches. Moreover, the privileges received repeated confirmations from the Bishops of Norwich and London, and the Archbishop of Canterbury, or from various popes. Although many of the numerous grants of land, rents, and the like, were of small value, others were worth more, such as the churches of Bradley, Little Bradley, Little Bunstead, Bunstead and Stamborne. In 1291 it had rents from 17 parishes to an annual value of £30 14s. 7½d, plus considerable lands and rents in Essex, and a small amount in Norfolk, yielding a total income of £53 13s. 3d.

Upon the death of Prior John Huditot in 1391, Robert Braybrooke (Bishop of London) and William (prior of Ogbourne, who had been authorized by Pope Boniface IX to act for the abbot of Bec in the case of dependent English houses) presented Richard de Cotesford, an English monk of the house, to the Henry le Despenser, Bishop of Norwich, to succeed as prior, with the assent of the king, who was acting patron since the heir of the Earl of March was at the time a minor. Despite this apparently positive turn of events, other developments proved less advantageous. Already in 1379 Richard II made a grant in favour of his uncle, Thomas de Woodstock, Earl of Buckingham, of £60 from priory funds to help to maintain his rank as an earl (Thomas was a son of King Edward III of England). In June 1395, another grant was made towards the expenses of the king's war with France, amounting to all the priory's annual income.

It was the next month, however, that the priory had enough high ranking support to secure another advantage, becoming denizen, i.e. naturalised. Unfortunately, to obtain this from the crown, Prior Richard Cotesford, had to pay 1,000 marks, at the rate of 100 marks a year, towards the building programme at Westminster Abbey. Another requirement was that the priory's monks were in future all to be of English birth, and payments of any kind to any foreign abbey were excluded. These were standard measures in England at the time.

== Suppression ==
Despite its cost, developments in English national politics meant this new status did not last long. As part of the process sometimes called the Dissolution of the Alien Priories, in 1415 the Priory was suppressed on the proposal of the patron, Edmund Mortimer, 5th Earl of March, to the benefit of the new College of Clare, intended to be a college of secular canons. The project gained the approval of a bull from the antipope John XXIII (1410–1415), regarded at the time by England as the legitimate pope, and was ratified by Pope Martin V, the universally acknowledged pope from 1417. These turbulent papal politics would at least part explain why the first charter of foundation was not sealed by the earl until 9 May 1419. who was also buried on site.

The college annexed Chipley Priory in about 1468.

== Priors of Stoke-by-Clare ==
- Nicholas, occurs 1174
- John de Havelen, reign of Henry II
- Hugh, occurs 1198, 1202
- Richard, occurs 1222
- John, occurs 1247, &c.
- Henry de Oxna, appointed 1325
- Peter de Valle, appointed 1367
- John de Huditot, died 1391
- Richard de Cotesford, appointed 1391
- William de Sancto Vedasto, appointed 1395
- William George, appointed 1396
- William Esterpenny, appointed 1396
