= Blakenham Priory =

Monastic estate in England

Blakenham Priory was an estate in monastic ownership in the late Middle Ages, located at Great Blakenham in Suffolk, England.

== Foundation ==
In the reign of King William Rufus (1087-1100), Walter Giffard was made 1st Earl of Buckingham. His father, also Walter Giffard, Lord of Longueville in Normandy had fought with William the Conqueror at the Battle of Hastings in 1066 and been given 107 English lordships, of these 48 were in Buckinghamshire. Walter the younger inherited this considerable portfolio by 1085 and was made Earl, probably in 1097.

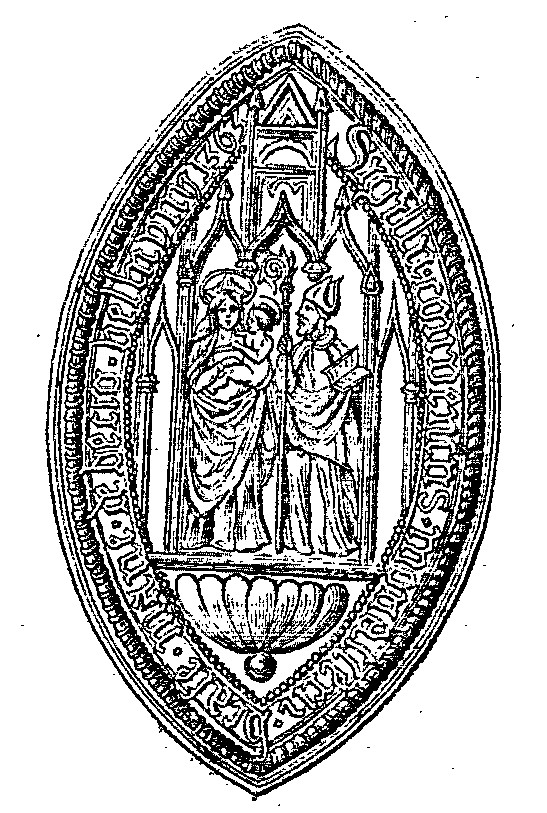
Seal of Bec Abbey

This nobleman at some time in William Rufus’ reign donated the manor of Blakenham to the great abbey of Bec

Bec was a Benedictine monastic foundation in Normandy, not far from Rouen. Founded in 1034, it became through the magnetic presence of the erudite Lanfranc of Pavia a focus of 11th century intellectual life, which developed further under its second abbot, Anselm. Both Lanfranc and Anselm were considerable international figures and both became in turn Archbishop of Canterbury. So it was that Bec became the most influential monastic centre of the 12th-century Anglo-Norman kingdom.

Many of the companions in arms and followers of William the Conqueror supported the abbey, enriching it with extensive properties in England, where Bec possessed in the 15th century several priories, namely, St Neots, Stoke-by-Clare, Wilsford, Steventon, Cowick, Ogbourne, and at some point also Blakenham and Povington Priory. St Neots Priory was particularly large. Bec also had Goldcliff Priory in Monmouthshire.

The London suburb of Tooting Bec takes its name from the medieval village’s having been a possession of Bec Abbey.

== Management ==
An estate of this size would have required supervision, probably of one or two monks, who would have their chapel and offices at the manor house in early days. In fact it is only some time after the grant that Blakenham is named as a distinct alien priory or cell. The term “priory” in this context was a conventual indication of monastic possession and does not necessarily imply monastic buildings, at least of any size. Instead of "priory", the terms "cell" or even "parcel" are also found. For a long time Blakenham was under the charge of the prior of Ruislip in Middlesex. Ruislip, Middlesex. Bec’s ownership of the manor of Blakenham was contested in the 1220s by one Thomas Ardern, but with the involvement of the crown, the rights of the prior of Ruislip as representing Bec Abbey were recognized. At a later point the point of administrative reference for Blakenham as a Bec property became the prior of Ogbourne or Okeburne in Wiltshire, whose involvement is mentioned in 1291 and 1325.

== An Alien Priory ==
As an alien priory (i.e., the dependency of a French mother-house) Blakenham would have had a certain instability of status before the English crown, especially whenever there were hostilities between France and England, and particularly during the Hundred Years' War. Its fate would have shared the fluctuating fortunes of every alien priory. These fluctuations were resolved for Blakenham when in the 19th year of the reign of Henry VI (1 September 1440 - -31 August 1441) the property of Blakenham Priory was granted to Eton College, a grant confirmed under Edward IV in 1467.
