= Povington Priory =

Monastery in Dorset, England

Coordinates: 50°37′50″N 2°09′57″W

Povington Priory was a Benedictine priory in Tyneham, Dorset, England.

It was established as an alien priory of the Abbey of Bec. This term could mean simply an estate and does not necessarily imply the presence on the property of even a small conventual monastic house.

In England, in the 15th century Bec possessed several priories, namely St Neots, Stoke-by-Clare, Wilsford, Steventon, Cowick, Ogbourne, and at some point also Blakenham Priory. St Neots Priory was particularly large. In Wales Bec also had Goldcliff Priory, in Monmouthshire.

The London suburb of Tooting Bec takes its name from the medieval villages, having been a possession of Bec Abbey.

Wool and English ewe's milk cheese produced at Povington were shipped to the Mother House via the docks at Wareham.

Following the dissolution of the alien priories, the lands were granted to St Anthony's Hospital, North Cheam.

== Reading ==
- Marjorie Chibnall, The English Lands of the Abbey of Bec, Oxford University Press, Oxford, 1946.
