= St Neots Priory =

10th-century monastery

St Neots Priory was a Benedictine monastery beside the town of St Neots in the historic county of Huntingdonshire which is now a district of the English county of Cambridgeshire.

== Anglo-Saxon monastery ==
A monastery was first founded here in about 974 by Earl Ælfric Cild (or Leofric) and his wife Aelfleda (or Æthelflæd), who granted it two hides of land, part of the manor of Eynesbury, later called the manor of St Neots. Its site is uncertain, though it may have been where the present St Mary's parish church stands. It is said that the relics of the Cornish Saint Neot were obtained from Neotstoke (now St Neot) in Cornwall and brought to the priory in order that it might have relics to attract pilgrims; hence the name of the town.

== Alien priory of Bec Abbey ==
Saint Anselm, abbot of Bec Abbey in Normandy and later to be Archbishop of Canterbury, apparently visited the shrine of St Neot in 1078-9. In 1081 he sent eighteen monks from Bec to replace the Saxon monks, and had it re-founded by Richard Fitz Gilbert and his wife Rothais or Rohais, lords of the manor, as a male Benedictine priory dependent on Bec. In 1113 Rothais granted the whole manor of St Neots to the priory, which it held until its suppression.

The Anglo-Norman nobility gave considerable support to Bec Abbey, enriching it with extensive properties in England, where in addition to St Neots, Bec possessed in the 15th century several priories, namely, Stoke-by-Clare, Wilsford, Steventon, Cowick, Ogbourne, and at some point also Blakenham Priory and Povington Priory. Among these St Neots Priory was particularly large. Bec also had Goldcliff Priory in Monmouthshire. The London suburb of Tooting Bec takes its name from the medieval village having been a possession of Bec Abbey.

At some point, quite possibly at the time of its re-foundation as a Benedictine priory, the monastery moved to a site on the riverside adjacent to a ford subsequently replaced by a bridge, a little way north of the present Market Square.

Because it was an alien priory (i.e., the dependency of a French mother-house) it suffered difficulties whenever there were hostilities between France and England, and particularly during the Hundred Years' War. Its property was continually seized for this reason, until like certain other alien priories it was eventually given its independence from Bec in 1409 by the quasi-naturalisation process known as denization.

== Dissolution ==
The priory was finally seized during the Dissolution of the Monasteries in 1539.

After the dissolution, the buildings were pulled down. The dissolution commissioners had instructions to "pull down to the ground all the walls of the churches, stepulls, cloysters, fraterys, dorters, chapter howsys" and all the rest. The materials were then to be sold for the profit of the Crown.

Nothing of the priory remains above ground; the last remaining structure, a gateway, was demolished in the late 18th century. A plaque marks the site.

== Priors ==
Priors
Name	Dates
Martin	resigned 1132
Herbert	occurs 1159 to 1173
Geoffrey	occurs 1200 to 1204
William	occurs 1206 to 1210
Roger	occurs 1218 to 1223
William	occurs 1224
Reginald	elected 1226
Hugh de Fagernum	occurs 1236, resigned 1248
Henry de Messeville	resigned 1258
William de Bonesbor	elected 1258
Elias de Ponte Episcopi, monk of Bec	elected 1262, resigned 1262
Henry of St Neots	elected 1264
Walter de Bernay	Not known
Thomas de Bensend	elected 1275
John de Bosco Reynoldi	elected 1285, resigned 1292
John de Secheville	elected 1292, died 1302
William de Bec	elected 1302
Geoffrey de Bec	elected 1317
Clement of St Stephen	elected 1322, occurs till 1331
Peter de Falk	elected 1341
William de Beaumont	elected 1349
Geoffrey de Branville	elected 1352
Peter de Villaribus	elected 1353
Christian de Troarn	elected 1364, died 1372
Robert de Glanville, monk of Bec	elected 1372, claimed to be prior 1373, resigned 1377
William of St Vedast	had custody 1377 to 1399
Edward Salisbury	elected 1405
William	occurs 1422
John Turvey	resigned before 1439
John Eton	occurs 1447
Henry	occurs 1459 to 1461
William Eynesbury	occurs 1464 to 1486
Thomas Raundes	resigned 1508
John Raundes	last prior, elected 1508

== Burials ==
- Richard fitz Gilbert, 1st Lord of Clare

== See also ==
- Annals of St Neots
