= Clare, Suffolk =

Market town in Suffolk, England

Coordinates: 52.08°N 0.58°E

Clare
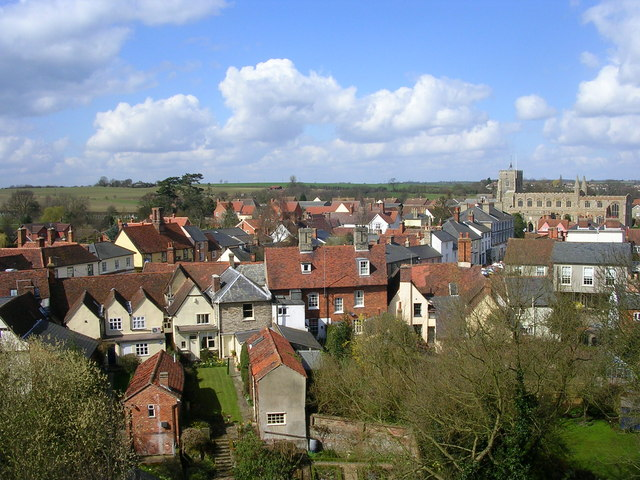
- View over Clare from castle motte

- Location within Suffolk
- Area: 9.26 km^{2} (3.58 sq mi)
- Population: 2,028 (2011 Census)
  - Density: 219/km^{2} (570/sq mi)
- OS grid reference: TL770456
- Civil parish: Clare
- District: West Suffolk
- Shire county: Suffolk
- Region: East
- Country: England
- Sovereign state: United Kingdom
- Post town: SUDBURY
- Postcode district: CO10
- Dialling code: 01787
- Police: Suffolk
- Fire: Suffolk
- Ambulance: East of England
- UK Parliament: South Suffolk

Clare is a market town and civil parish on the north bank of the River Stour in the West Suffolk district, in the county of Suffolk, England. Clare is in southwest Suffolk, 14 miles (23 km) from Bury St Edmunds and 9 miles (14 km) from Sudbury. Clare won Village of the Year in 2010 and Anglia in Bloom award for Best Large Village 2011 for its floral displays in 2011. In March 2015, The Sunday Times and Zoopla placed Clare amongst the top 50 UK rural locations, having "period properties and rich history without the chocolate-box perfection – and the coach trips". In 2011 it had a population of 2,028.

Clare and its vicinity has evidence of human habitation throughout prehistory, through the Norman Conquest, to the present day. Through the Anglo-Norman family de Clare, who took the name of this village, the name spread to other places and institutions such as County Clare in Ireland and Clare College, Cambridge.

The town hosts Stour Valley Community School, one of the first free schools established by the government, opened in September 2011.

== Geology ==
This area of the country was formed during the Tertiary period, containing some of the youngest rock in the British Isles. Like the vast majority of Suffolk, the surface 'rock' is the very fertile boulder clay or clay loam, lying on top of layers of chalk. The landscape surrounding the Stour Valley is the result of the joint effects of past glaciation and the agricultural alteration of the land. Originally the area was under the sea; the shells of the sea creatures dropped to bed of the ocean and formed into chalk about 140 million years ago. Another mineral, silica, filled the sponges and other similar animals in the sea. As this was left behind it formed nodules of hard flint.

A ridge of Cretaceous chalk left by the ancient sea juts into Suffolk from Cambridgeshire. This ridge is never more than 140 metres above sea level but it makes what is called High Suffolk. This chalk layer forms the so-called solid rock layer. This chalk was originally quarried where it came to the surface, and was either burned to produce agricultural lime or was mixed with sand, quarried locally, for mortar used in building (hence the presence of cream bricks ('Suffolk whites') for houses in the area). Chalk in the water makes it 'hard' (classified as 'very hard; 511 mg/L as calcium carbonate) according to Anglian Water's water quality.

During the Ice Age, the sea level was some 200 metres lower than it is today. Melt water carried debris and flowed beneath the glacier under high pressure, to produce tunnel valleys, deeply incised water routes. At Clare it is as far as 110 metres below our present sea level. The valley was subsequently filled with boulder clay and gravel. The ice sheet, which produced the chalky boulder clay, rolled upon a bed of glacial sand and gravel, and formed the flattened character of the area today.

The main river running through the country park is not the Stour. This is a mill stream called the 'new cut', established to operate a mill belonging to the priory, in use in the 13th century. It is joined at the eastern end of the country park by the Chilton stream. This itself is fed by the Hawedych, and by another stream coming down from Poslingford. The smaller Stour now runs south of the country park, meandering around the priory and meadows.

== Governance ==
In 1894 Clare became part of Clare Rural District which became part of the administrative county of West Suffolk in 1889. In 1974 Clare became part of St Edmundsbury district in the non-metropolitan county of Suffolk. In 2019 Clare became part of West Suffolk district.

== History ==
=== Prehistory ===
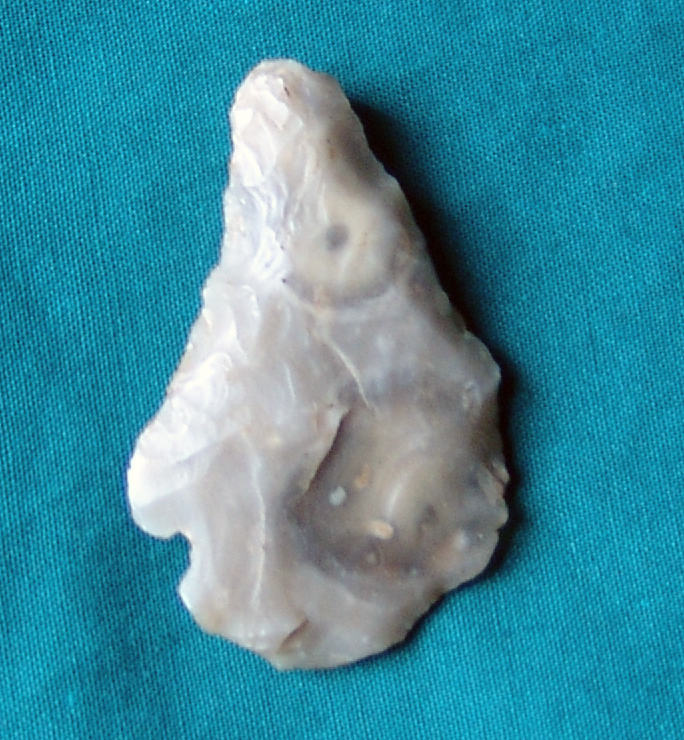
Neolithic flint arrowhead found in Bridewell Street, Clare

Paleolithic implements were discovered within the Priory grounds. A Mesolithic quartzite pebble macehead was found in the same location. A Neolithic stone axe was retrieved from the River Stour; a polished flint axe in a gravel pit to the east and a flint head in a meadow just off the Ashen Road. A Neolithic flint arrowhead was found in a garden on Bridewell Street. A Neolithic long mortuary enclosure and three Bronze Age barrows were located across the river towards Ashen. Evidence of a barrow together with 200 worked flints were found near Chilton Street. A Bronze Age socketed gouge was unearthed from plough soil on the Common. There are some 24 other pre-Iron Age structures in the parishes around Clare which may be located via Google Maps.

An Iron Age pot was found embedded in the river bank, half a mile east of Clare. Together with an iron spearhead, they are held in The Ancient House. Iron Age coins have also been found, one from the Belgic Trinovantes tribe. In 2009 during a recent rebuilding programme at Clare Community Primary School, postholes of a late Bronze/Early Iron Age structure were located, with an associated ring ditch. This supports the view that Clare Camp (OS TL768458, at the north end of the town, just behind Bridewell Street) with its double ditches, one of the most impressive of its kind in Suffolk, is from that period; with an area of 2.9 hectares, it is second only to Burgh Castle. It is now entered into the Atlas of Hillforts. The north side is most complete, with an inner rampart 9 ft high and counterscarps 12 and 14 ft high. In 1993 a field survey and magnetometric scan revealed the possibility of entrances on the east and south sides. Clare was on the outer borders of the Trinovantes territory, just south of the Iceni. The camp probably marks the first permanent settlement in the area.

=== Roman ===
A Roman boundary ditch and posthole has been found just off Nethergate Street; a strap fitting, coins, sepulchral urns and a bronze figurine of Mercury or a dancing boy have been unearthed in various locations. Some Roman brick seems to have ended up in the Parish Church.

There were substantial settlements to the west at Wixoe and to the east at Long Melford. Archaeological digs and magnetic survey at Wixoe, as part of the Abberton pipeline installation, revealed a small town occupied from 100-400AD. The Via Devana from Chester to Colchester, a military road, passed through this town. Another road led east from Wixoe, on the north side of the Stour, passing through Long Melford, before heading north-east to Baylham and possibly to Dunwich on the coast; this route is associated with a prehistoric road. No clear trace of this road can now be seen between Wixoe and Cavendish: the agger in the form of terrace has either been eroded by ploughing or incorporated into field boundaries, as is typical in East Anglia.

=== Norman ===
The name first appears in the Domesday Book of 1086 as 'Clara'. It possibly derives from the "clear" nature of the Chilton Stream as it flows through the town, but from a Latin word rather than a Celtic one as was previously thought. In the Domesday Book, it is described as "Always a market. Now 43 burgesses". Hatton describes this as an "astonishingly high number, because at the time very few Suffolk towns had any burgesses, let alone 43". It lists 37 acres (15 ha) of meadow, woodland for 12 swine, a mill, 5 arpents of vineyard (an arpent was 4–6 acres) and 400 sheep. The manor included Stoke-by-Clare and the hamlet of Chilton Street, totalling 128 households. Improbably it has been suggested that the word claret is derived from Clare and its extensive vineyards. There is a Claret Hall towards Ashen, but that could simply mean 'Little Clare'.

=== The feudal lords of Clare ===
The Domesday Book records that the lands around Clare belonged to a Saxon thane, Aluric (or Aelfric), son of Wisgar (or Withgar) and that he gave them to St John, probably creating in Clare a collegiate church, under Edward the Confessor. William the Conqueror re-granted the land to one of his closest supporters in the Norman Conquest of 1066, Richard fitz Gilbert of Bienfaite, Count of Brionne, the son of one of his cousins, along with 170 other manors, 95 of them in Suffolk. Apart from being related to William, Richard's relationship with the king was further embedded as his father-in-law, Walter Giffard, Lord of Longueville was one of the 15 or so known companions of William at the Battle of Hastings in 1066. This huge feudal barony became known as the Honour of Clare and Richard became known as "Richard de Clare" (or "of Clare") after he made the castle of Clare the administrative centre, or Caput baroniae, of the honour. He also held a large manor in Tonbridge, Kent where he built a motte and bailey castle of a very similar size to Clare Castle. Clare Castle is first recorded in 1090.

After 1066, William was not only King of England but also Duke of Normandy and spent time in both places. When he was away from England, Richard served as joint Chief Justiciar in William's absence, and played a major part in suppressing the revolt of 1075.

His son Gilbert de Clare gave the church in the castle to the Benedictine Bec Abbey in Normandy. Gilbert and his brother were present with Prince Henry when King William II was shot dead by an arrow fired by Walter Tyrell, Gilbert's steward. Tradition is strong that the Clares had staged an assassination. King Henry I was crowned three days later.

In 1124 Gilbert's son Richard de Clare removed the Benedictines to a new foundation in Stoke-by-Clare, which later became a college of priests and was the site of today's Stoke College.

In 1140 Richard's son Gilbert de Clare was given the title of Earl of Hertford by King Stephen. He joined the revolt against the king but later returned to support him.

Richard de Clare, 3rd Earl of Hertford and his son Gilbert were two of the 25 barons appointed as guardians to Magna Carta of 1215. Richard married the heiress of the Earl of Gloucester, whose sister had been the first wife of King John.

Gilbert de Clare, 4th Earl of Hertford inherited the title and vast estates of the Earl of Gloucester. It was his son, Richard who brought the Augustinian Friars to Clare to found the mother house in England in 1248.

The wealthiest of the Clare family was Gilbert de Clare, 7th Earl of Gloucester ('the Red'). He sided with Simon de Montfort and attended Montfort's Parliament, but then fell out with Montfort and fought alongside Prince Edward at the Battle of Evesham, when Montfort was killed. He seized London and held it against King Henry III. After King Edward I's accession, he married Joan of Acre in 1290, the king's daughter. He surrendered his lands to the king and was re-granted them. He held land in 26 English counties and also estates in Wales, including Caerphilly, Usk and Tintern. This era represented the high point of the family as a major force in English history.

On his death in 1295, his wife Joan remarried one of his household knights and began new works at Clare Priory. She was buried in the Chapel of St Vincent which she herself had founded in 1307. The funeral was one of the major public events in Clare's history, attended by royalty and nobility, including her brother King Edward II. Hatton wrote: "Fifty-two years after her burial the grave was opened and her body found to be incorrupt...Of the many miracles wrought by God's grace through her (were) especially...the cure of toothache, back-ache and fever".

Her son Gilbert was the last male de Clare. At the battle of Bannockburn in 1314, he was accused of cowardice and treason when he recommended holding the better ground rather than attacking Bruce's densely packed pike walls. Against his better judgement he led the charge and was killed. One of Gilbert's sisters, Elizabeth de Burgh eventually came into the property of Clare, and she endowed what would become Clare College, Cambridge.

William de Burgh was Elizabeth's son by her first husband, John de Burgh, next in line to the Earldom of Ulster. He was assassinated in Carrickfergus in 1333 by his Irish cousins. His daughter Elizabeth was married to the third son of Edward III. Her husband Lionel thereby came into the Clare inheritance and became the Duke of Clarence. Chaucer the poet was at one time a page to him. After Elizabeth's death in 1360, he married the Count of Milan's daughter. There were wild rumours he was about to become King of Italy, but he died near Pavia a few months after his marriage. Following his last wish, his heart and bones were brought back to Clare for burial beside his first wife.

The title of Clarenceux King of Arms, an heraldic officer, is also derived from Clare or Clarence.

The estate passed into the hands of the Mortimers, the Earls of March. The castle began to fall into disrepair from this time. The last descendant was Edward V, one of the two Princes in the Tower. Henry VII took over Clare borough and manor. Henry VIII gave them to each of his wives in turn, Katherine of Aragon leasing the common to the poor of Clare. Under Queen Mary, the lands of the Honour of Clare were transferred to the Duchy of Lancaster (which is why today The Sovereign will technically appoint the Vicar). The title of Duke of Clarence was last held by Albert Victor, the eldest son of Albert Edward, Prince of Wales (later King Edward VII) and Alexandra, Princess of Wales (later Queen Alexandra), and the grandson of the reigning monarch, Queen Victoria. From the time of his birth, he was second in the line of succession to the throne, but he did not become king because he died before his father and his grandmother, the Queen. He had agreed to be the patron of the Royal Clarence Lodge of the Freemasons in Clare but died in 1892 before he could attend the opening ceremony.

=== Life in the Medieval Castle ===
At its height in Elizabeth de Burgh's time the castle offered substantial employment, perhaps 250 persons not counted amongst the townspeople. The manor's home farm provided the bulk of basic foodstuffs from the pastures and meadows plus fruit from the orchards of pear, apple and cherry. Within the castle grounds, there were fishponds, a horse driven mill, woodyard, a vineyard, kennels, a dovecote and a swannery. There were forges, both for weaponry and farming implements. She had her own potters, carpenters, goldsmiths and embroidery studio. She hired copiers to create masterpieces on vellum. Above all there were the brewhouses and bakeries producing great quantities of ale and bread. In one year the accounts show wheat for 106,248 loaves and malt for 40,682 gallons of ale.

The castle had one principal gateway, a substantial buildings in its own right, now gone – only the name Nethergate or Bottom Gate survives. There were several towers aside from the keep; we know their names: Auditor's, Constable', Oxenford and Maiden's, but not their locations. Beautiful gardens were laid out. There were flint paths, seats, a glass aviary, fountains, a deer enclosure and a lion house (keeping exotic animals was the fashion). After her death in 1360, the castle became increasingly unused. It passed through her granddaughter (also Elizabeth) to Lionel of Antwerp, son of Edward III, and through their daughter by marriage to the Mortimers. By the 1480s it had been largely abandoned. In the C17, it is described as 'nothing but lamentable ruins upon a most beautiful situation'.

=== The Black Death ===
Early in 1349 the plague reached East Anglia. 'In the Manorial Court Rolls for March....there are very long lists of the death of tenants.'. The rolls cease in September and do not resume until 1360. Yet the Court Rolls of the Borough do not show the same pattern: court leets continue as before, the number of brewers, bakers, butchers and others accused of sharp practices remains constant. The Wentford fair was held as normal. Elizabeth de Burgh's castle records have no mention of the plague nor show any fall in the day-to-day activities. Everything suggests the town was little affected.

=== Guilds ===
Local people organised themselves into guilds, not for mercantile or craft purposes, but as religious fraternities, dedicated to assisting the poor, praying for dead members, contributing to the church and priory. We know of five in Clare: St Augustine, St Peter, St Mary, Corpus Christi and St John the Baptist, the latter based on Chilton Street. Guilds began before the Normans; one of the oldest recorded was in Glemsford, the Fraternity of the Clerks, founded around 1020. The name Corpus Christi dates from the 1340s when that feast day was introduced from the continent; it soon became the most popular holy day in the calendar – see the mystery plays of Norwich and Ely, and all across England. The eponymous college in Cambridge was founded by a guild, in response to the decimation of the Black Death. This event seems to have concentrated people's minds on their heavenly prospects. By prayer and acts of charity (carried out in the guild's name rather than personally), a guild member hoped to ensure a swifter passage for himself and his family through purgatory to heaven.

By the time of Henry VIII, most areas of England had as many as 50 public holidays (holy days) a year on which no one worked. The guild whose feast day it was would hold a solemn procession and celebrate mass in the church. They would then provide entertainment such as mummers or miracle plays and food for the poor of their community. The Guild of St John put out casks of ale: "fyve hockepottes or drinkinges in v stretes or places, namelye, market strete one, nethergate strete kepte another, challice strete a third, higherowe a fourth, and Chilton strete alwayes kepte the fifte".

There was a guildhall in the town, opposite the church, probably shared by different guilds. Elsewhere, as in Lavenham, each guild had its own building, but Clare seems less well endowed. The C14 building still stands, now a doctor's surgery; fine old beams may be seen in the waiting room.

As elsewhere there are scanty records as all religious guilds were suppressed under an Act of Parliament in 1547 and their properties and assets seized. This Act also forbade the worship and representation of saints and masses for the dead. Public holidays (holy days) on which a guild would provide food for the poor and entertainment such as mummers or miracle plays all stopped at the same time, along with feast day markets. The annual market at Wentford, a noted regional event held on the Feast of Nativity of the Virgin Mary (8 September) disappeared. This suppression and its effect on the social and religious life is described as the Stripping of the Altars.

=== Wool Town ===
During the medieval period Clare became a prosperous town based on cloth making. The trade was already present by the 13th century, steadily expanding as demand grew. 3000 local fleeces were sold from Clare Manor alone in 1345. By the 1470s Suffolk produced more cloth than any other county. Broadcloth was the main product, somewhat coarser than Harris Tweed, prickly to the skin, odorous when wet. Flowing water was essential for the purpose of fulling – so production concentrated on locations along rivers such as Clare, Cavendish, Glemsford and Sudbury. Many houses in Clare had cellars through which culverts were led.

Merchants gathered in convoys for safety to convey the goods to Calais (then an English possession). Several locations in Suffolk were known as collection points – one of these is Callis Street in Clare, just north of the parish church, variously named Calais or Chalyce Street.

Clothiers organised and financed the industry, putting out work across the town, supporting road maintenance, providing alms to the poor, embellishing the priory and church, building substantial houses for themselves.

At the same time as the major disruption to the social and religious life of the townspeople took place in the 1540s, the introduction of the spinning wheel and the importation of newer fabrics from the continent led to a fall in the manufacture of broadcloth. Clare recovered some of its industry in the late 16th century, by taking up what is called the 'New Draperies', lighter and cheaper cloths called 'bays and says'. 'A bay was lighter and finer than modern baize.... A say was a fine durable cloth, made entirely of wool with a texture resembling serge'. By the 18th century this industry was in decline, becoming concentrated in the larger towns, Ipswich and Colchester. At the close of the 16th century, Sir Robert Jermyn described Clare as '... a populous market town [which] requires an able, painful and discreet teacher ...' in a letter to Robert Cecil requesting the appointment of a 'Mr Colte' as the town's new pastor.

=== Into the modern age ===
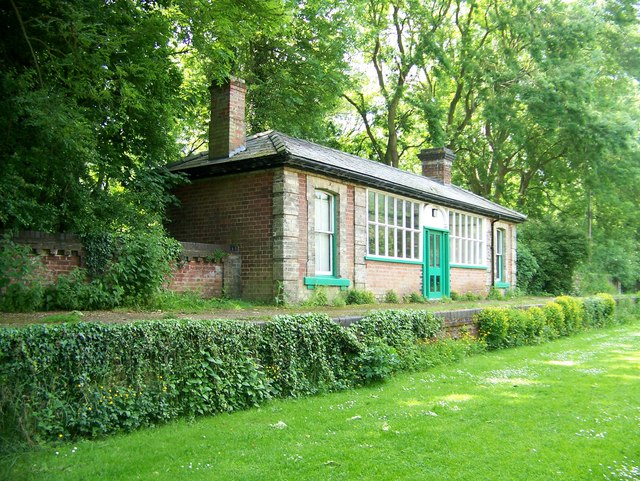
Clare railway station in 2008

From the relative boom of the 16th century, Clare suffered a gradual decline as a leading town in West Suffolk. For a while in the 17th century, it retained some status as a transport and distribution hub, lying on a major highway into London. Hostelries were set up and warehouses occupied a key role in the economy. Trade was diverted as the Stour became navigable as far as Sudbury in 1709. The handloom weaving industry was gone by the 1800s; the last weaver died in 1825, aged 83. Straw-plaiting for ladies' bonnets, a local cottage industry, disappeared as fashions changed.

After an agricultural boom in the Napoleonic wars, farmers were hit by falling prices; many labourers were laid off. Opposition to newer technology appeared in Clare and surrounding districts in 1816 and four local men were gaoled after being convicted of burning a threshing machine. This was the Year Without a Summer caused by volcanic dust in the atmosphere: the local press reported floods, 'long continued wet weather', unripened wheat and widespread civil unrest. Harvests were again terrible in 1828 and 1829, followed by the Swing Riots. The Long Depression (1870–1895) caused many families to move away from the town.

=== Historic travel writing ===
William Camden in his Britain, or, a Chorographicall Description of the most flourishing Kingdomes, England, Scotland, and Ireland (1610) wrote: 'On the South side wee saw the river Stour, which immediately from the verie spring head spreadeth a great Mere called Stourmmere, but soone after, drawing it selfe within the bankes, runneth first by Clare, a noble village which had a castle, but now decaied, and gave name to the right noble familie of the Clares'.

Daniel Defoe in A tour thro' the Whole Island of Great Britain (1748 4th edition) said that Clare was "a poor town and dirty, the streets being unpaved. But yet the civil and spiritual courts are held at it and it has a good church; it shows still the ruins of a strong castle, and an old monastery. It has a manufacture of says…". He also describes great droves of turkeys being taken to Colchester from Clare, 300 to 1,000 birds at a time.

=== Managing a Masterpiece ===
As part of the Heritage Lottery Funded "Managing a Masterpiece" scheme, in April and May 2011 Access Cambridge Archaeology gave residents, school pupils and members of the public the chance to carry out their own small archaeological 'test pit' excavations throughout Clare, to find out how the town developed over hundreds – even thousands – of years in the past. Early results indicated the presence of Saxon pottery across many sites – the first evidence of Clare's importance before the Normans. Further excavations within the castle grounds took place in 2013 and the discovery of human remains suggested a cemetery was located there, before the castle's construction.

== Architecture ==
=== Listed buildings ===
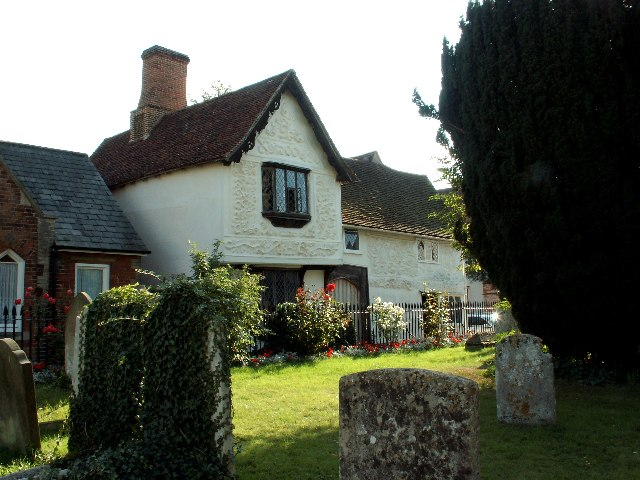
Ancient House, in Church Street

There are 133 listed buildings in Clare. An online map is available, with links to each building. Over 40 of the listed buildings are 16th-century or earlier. There are three Grade 1 religious buildings: the Priory, the Priory Chapel and the parish church of Ss Peter and Paul. There are three Grade 1 domestic houses: Cliftons and Nethergate House in Nethergate Street and the Ancient House in Church Street. The Ancient House, which has florid pargeting, is in part a museum, in part available as a holiday-let through the Landmark Trust. A rare 13th-century flint-lined well has been found in the garden behind the No 1 Deli Cafe. There are fine examples of timber-framed houses throughout the town, from the 14th to the 16th centuries, plus Georgian and Victorian houses. Most of the later houses are constructed in Flemish bond, but there is one example of a rat trap bond in Station Road. Some of the weavers' cottages had cellars through which water ran for fulling their cloth. The heart of the town is a conservation area, one of 35 recognised by St Edmundsbury Council. A full appraisal of buildings was carried out in 2008 within the conservation plan.

Suffolk has no natural building stone. Buildings are mainly of timber, usually oak beams with wattle and daub infill, or brick. Brickyards abounded in Suffolk. Clare had its own brickyard in the 19th century, run by the Jarvis family. Examples of brick from Gestingthorpe and Ballingdon can also be found, both Suffolk whites and reds. Flint is used as an infill or in walling. Where stone is found it was largely imported from Barnack, near Peterborough. This was transported along the Fenland waterways and brought into Suffolk, either overland from Cambridge or possibly by sail to Manningtree and then up the Stour.

The 13th-century flint-stone castle keep sits upon a 70 feet (21 m) high motte overlooking the town on the banks of the River Stour. Parts of the inner and outer baileys still exist. The castle is part of the Clare Castle Country Park which has the distinction of containing the only (now decommissioned) railway station built within a castle in the UK. The station was built by the Great Eastern Railway on the Stour Valley Railway and closed in 1967. The complex of stationmaster's house, ticket and parcels office, waiting rooms, platforms and goods shed has been listed, as the only complete set of 1865 GER buildings to survive intact. The park has 25 acres (10 ha) of landscaped parkland, interlaced with water in the old moats. The Stour Valley Path crosses the park.

Crossing the Stour en route to Ashen is a three span cast iron bridge, built when Clare was on a main highway between London and Bury St Edmunds. It was Sir William Cubitt's second design for a bridge. The date of completion 1813 can be seen above the central arch. The iron was almost certainly cast at Ransomes of Ipswich, a foundry mostly known for agricultural machinery for whom Cubitt worked. Later they supplied the new railways across East Anglia. In good condition, the bridge is Suffolk's oldest iron bridge still in use.

The tower of the wool church (St Peter and St Paul's church, below) was a restoration project of the well known Arts & Crafts architect Detmar Blow, who also designed an addition (and possibly other works) to Clare Priory. While in Clare, he lived in the Ancient House.

=== Churches ===
There are four churches in Clare today, ordered below by date of building.

- The Clare Priory Chapel – Mother of Good Counsel]. Just across the river is the first house of the Augustinian Friars in England, founded at the behest of Richard de Clare, Earl of Gloucester: Clare Priory, established in 1248. The friars were dependent on local people for their daily needs; they would have been familiar figures in the streets of Clare in their black habits as they ministered to the spiritual and welfare needs of their parishioners. The priory was suppressed in 1538. Many of the priory buildings, including the large church, fell into disrepair; just as happened to the derelict castle, the townspeople helped themselves to a source of materials. The property changed hands a number of times until it was re-acquired by the Augustinians in 1953. The former infirmary had become a barn and was restored to create a chapel for worship. The site remains in use today as both a parish and a retreat centre. A Craft Fair is held in July, attracting 10,000 visitors over two days, proceeds going to charity. The chapel has been extended to form a new church in contemporary style. This is winner of the "Building Conservation" category in the Royal Institute of Chartered Surveyors 2015 Awards; the completed work has been declared Project of the Year.
- St Peter and St Paul's Church, Clare which is Anglican
- The United Reformed Church. In 1645 a group of non-conforming dissenters appointed their own minister. As numbers grew, licences were issued for houses as places of worship. A third of the East Anglian established clergy left to become presbyterian or independent. In 1710 a large meeting place was built behind Nethergate Street, replacing a smaller presbyterian conventicle. In 1841 this was rebuilt as the plain but attractive church it is today. An ancient graveyard adjoins the church.
- Clare Baptist Church. In 1801 some independents broke away and formed a baptist group. In 1802 twelve of them went to Halstead to be baptised as adults. In 1805 they built the first Baptist Church on Cavendish Street. This was rebuilt in 1821 to accommodate a bigger congregation. In 1859 this was demolished and the building material taken to the High Street to help create a new church which stands today.

In the past, Quakers were strong in the area and had their own building by 1686, a cottage at the north foot of the castle motte. The then owner of the castle and priory, Captain Charles Barnardiston was a Quaker. He and his fellows were prosecuted for his beliefs and 'was debarred of the use of their meeting-house, and obliged to meet in the street during the cold winter, where they received much personal abuse'. What is left of the burial ground is now part of 3 Cavendish Road. The nearest Meeting Houses are now Bardfield, Bury St Edmunds and Sudbury.

The oldest religious building in Clare still existing is the Norman chapel of St Mary Magdalene, dated c1190. Built as a wayside chapel just ½ mile north of Clare, close to a confluence of the Chilton stream at Wentford, it fell into disrepair by 1403 but was later granted to the Guild of St John the Baptist in Chilton. At the time of the dissolution of guilds and chantry chapels in 1547, the priest worked in Clare parish church and also in the grammar school. It was converted for domestic use. In the Civil War it was used as a powder magazine. Grade II* listed as Chapel Cottage, today it is called Old Chapel; remains of Norman windows, a bellcote, timber framing and an arched doorway are visible.

Chipley Abbey, just to the west of Poslingford, is a Grade II listed farmhouse incorporating part of the cloisters and moat of Chipley Priory, an Augustinian Canons foundation created before 1235.

=== Public houses ===
There are four public houses in the town, all of them occupying historic buildings.

- The Swan in the High Street occupies the oldest premises: one owner died from the Black Death in 1349. The central chimney stack with four orthogonal shafts predates the main structure from around 1600. Above the main doorway is a carved solid block of oak – possibly the oldest inn sign in England. It seems to be the base of an oriel window taken from Clare Castle. The central figure is of a chained swan with a crown round the neck – the badge of Henry IV. Other symbols link it to Henry V, the Mortimers and de Burghs. A grape vine suggests a link with Clare's fame as a wine-producing area.
- The Bell on Market Hill occupies a small alehouse site and was extensively altered to become the Green Dragon around 1580. In the 1780s it became a post house (providing changes of horses and gigs for hire) when the beautiful interior carved beams and ceilings were added. It was a wholesale trading house with brew house and bar. Early in the 19th century it specialised in chandlery – oil, ropes and candles were made on the premises. At the rear the cattle market was held till the mid-1850s. In the 1970s, 18th-century stables were converted to 23 hotel bedrooms.
- The Cock in Callis Street may date from the 15th century but the first reference to it as an inn is in 1636. In its time various parts of the current building were used as a barn, then as a schoolroom, later a family butcher's with its own slaughterhouse. It was linked for a time with the Nethergate brewery, which was founded in Clare.
- The Globe, a few houses away from the Cock, dates from 1695, re-fronted in Suffolk white brick early in the 19th century – this was a common practice in those days, giving a building a new respectable front, while retaining the old timber frame behind. It probably opened as a pub in the 1880s.

Other public houses and hostelries existed in the past, all buildings still standing, except the last: the Old Red Lion 17th century, the Old Bear and Crown Hotel 16th century, the White Hart Inn 19th century (later the Temperance Hotel), the Half Moon 15th century, the Clare Hotel 19th century, the Castle 19th century, the Boar and Griffin 16th century, and the Old Angel.

On the High Street, where numbers 10 A and B now stand, the Nethergate Brewery was created in 1986. In 2004, it moved across the river to Pentlow. It has since moved to Rodbridge corner, on the outskirts of Sudbury.

== Shops ==
Clare has a large number of independent shops, many in Grade II listed buildings. These are clustered in the conservation area. With the exception of the Co-operative Food supermarket, there are no other chain stores in the town. Its historic market has been on Market Hill in modern form, and is held on the third Saturday of each month.

== Agriculture ==
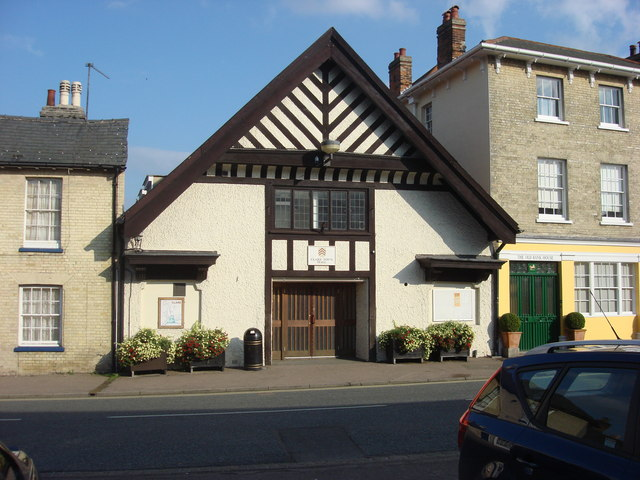
Clare Town Hall

The Suffolk Landscape Character Assessment, published by Suffolk County Council, available online, examines the characteristics of the landscape topology around Clare, which consists of valley meadowlands and undulating farmlands, both ancient and estate.

The majority of agriculture around Clare is arable. Crops grown include winter wheat, winter barley, sugar beet, oilseed rape and broad beans for fodder, with smaller areas of rye and oats. The sugar beet is taken to the British Sugar factory in Bury St Edmunds.

In the Tudor period, the area is described as: "Wood-pasture region, mainly pasture, meadow, engaged in rearing and dairying with some bee-keeping, horse-breeding and poultry. Crops mainly barley with some wheat, rye, oats, peas, vetches, hops and occasionally hemp."

Because of the Stour there were mills in Clare, four reported in 1295. Malting Lane marks one, Mill Lane another. At least one mill was for fulling. The last corn mill, an 18th-century timber-framed structure together with a 19th-century brick boiler house and steam engine, known as Waymans Mill, was destroyed by fire in the late 1970s. Windmills also existed – there is a ruinous stack near Chilton Street.

The market that had run in Market Hill from before the Norman Conquest shrank after the arrival of the railway in 1865. Farmers preferred to take their produce to the larger markets of Ipswich, Sudbury or Cambridge. The Corn Exchange of 1838 eventually closed and was later replaced by Clare Town Hall.

There have been dramatic changes to farming and the agricultural landscape, particularly in the last century. Just north of Stoke-by-Clare is an example. Hull's Farm of 750 acres (300 ha) was divided into 67 fields, bounded by hedges and elm trees, with 30 farm workers and many horses. Pressure on farmers to increase food production during and after World War II, resulted in removal of a wood of 40 acres (16 ha), grubbed up to control the rabbit population, leaving 6 acres (2.4 ha) of Lord's Wood. Hedgerows were cut down. Dutch elm disease then decimated the tree population, leaving a wide open landscape. Now the farm buildings have been replaced by a nature reserve and the land incorporated into Stonard's Farm, with five farm workers and four tractors. The crop trebled between 1955 and 1996.

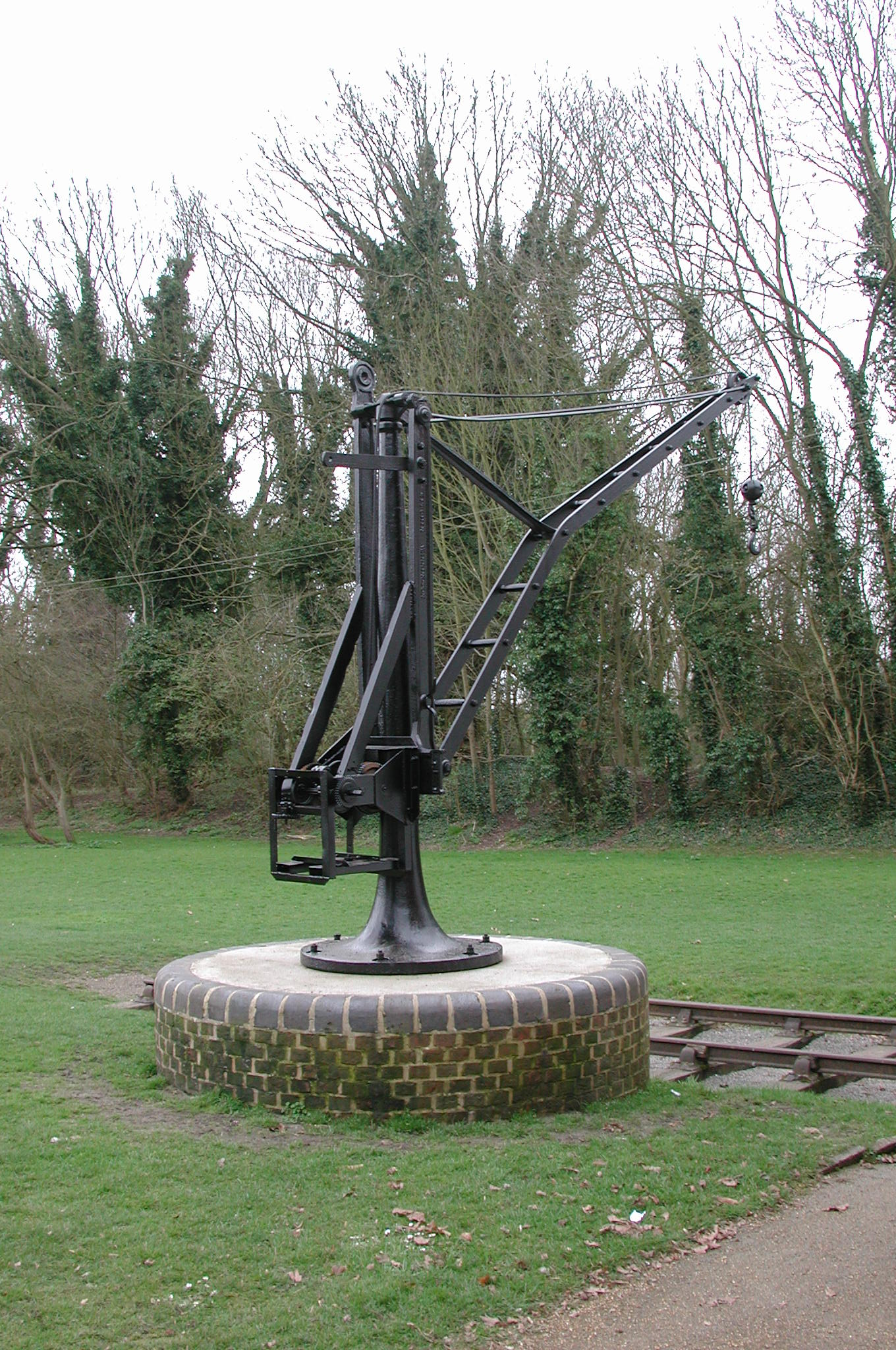
Machinery at the disused railway station

== Local issues ==
Country Park
Ownership of Clare Castle Country Park passed from Suffolk County Council to Clare Town Council in March 2015. The park is managed by the Clare Castle Country Park Trust, with the help of volunteers. The rehabilitation of buildings is now complete; this includes restoration of the stationmaster's house as a residence and of the principal waiting room.
Library
Suffolk County Council has created an independent service to run libraries in the future. A Friends of Clare Library group has been formed.

== Town or village ==
At the time of the Domesday Book, while several towns in Suffolk had markets, Clare was one of only six towns that had burgesses as well. Its manor was among the largest in the county. The Lords of Clare established it as their administrative centre, the castle itself providing work for scores of people. It was known as a borough by 1262, but no charter survives and no parliamentary seat was established – unlike Sudbury. By 1294 a fair was established. From the 11th century through to the 16th century there was plenty of employment and prosperity; the wool cloth trade flourished, first making broadcloth, later making bay and say cloth. It became a key staging post on a main highway to London, with warehouses and hostelries. Trade declined when the Stour became navigable as far as Sudbury in 1709. Weaving ceased and the town became a small agricultural centre, trade shrinking further when the railway arrived. The Parish Council was created in 1894.

The population remained consistently below 2,000 across the ages. The number of houses increased from 152 (including Wixoe and Chilton Street) in 1674 to 852 in 1991, and 950 in 2015; living space standards increased dramatically in the last century. Unusually for a settlement of just over 2,000, it has a full range of services: butcher, doctors, library, co-op, five cafes, three public houses – two serving food, restaurants, take-aways, antique shops, pharmacy, hairdressers, post office with news and stationery, churches, physiotherapy, photographer, undertaker, architect, gift shops, optician, accountant, solicitor, sandwich shop, estate agents, bed and breakfasts, bookshop, stables, 2 auctions, printer, car bodywork, car repairs, 9-hole golf course, garden bulbs, fisheries, website design, many trades, winner of the Best Conservation Project in the Anglia in Bloom competition 2011.

In modern terms, Clare is a large village, hence its award as "Suffolk Village of the Year 2010", In April 2012, the parish council renamed itself as a Town Council.

== Notable people ==
- Elizabeth Mary Wells (1863–1922), missionary and doctor, was born in Clare.
- Eric Barwell (1913–2007), flying ace of the Royal Air Force during the Second World War
- Peter Padfield (1932–2022), historian and author
- Pamela Hansford Johnson (1952–1957) Nethergate House.
- C. P. Snow (1952–1957) Nethergate House.
- Mark Fiennes (1933-2004), photographer & illustrator.

== Demography ==
According to the Office for National Statistics, at the time of the 2011 United Kingdom census, Clare had a population of 2,028.

=== Population change ===
Population growth in Clare from 1801 to 1891
| Year | 1801 | 1811 | 1821 | 1831 | 1841 | 1851 | 1881 | 1891 |
|---|---|---|---|---|---|---|---|---|
| Population | 1,033 | 1,170 | 1,487 | 1,619 | 1,700 | 1,769 | 1,704 | 1,657 |
Source: A Vision of Britain Through Time

Population growth in Clare from 1901 to 2011
| Year | 1901 | 1911 | 1921 | 1931 | 1951 | 1961 | 2011 |
|---|---|---|---|---|---|---|---|
| Population | 1,582 | 1,483 | 1,340 | 1,252 | 1,320 | 1,328 | 2,028 |
Source: A Vision of Britain Through Time
