= Poslingford =

Village in Suffolk, England

Coordinates: 52.1034°N 0.5833°E

- Location within Suffolk
- Population: 187 (2011)
- Shire county: Suffolk
- Region: East
- Country: England
- Sovereign state: United Kingdom
- Post town: Sudbury
- Postcode district: CO10

Poslingford is a village and civil parish in the West Suffolk district of Suffolk in eastern England. The village follows the line of The Street the main road through to the village of Stansfield

== Church ==
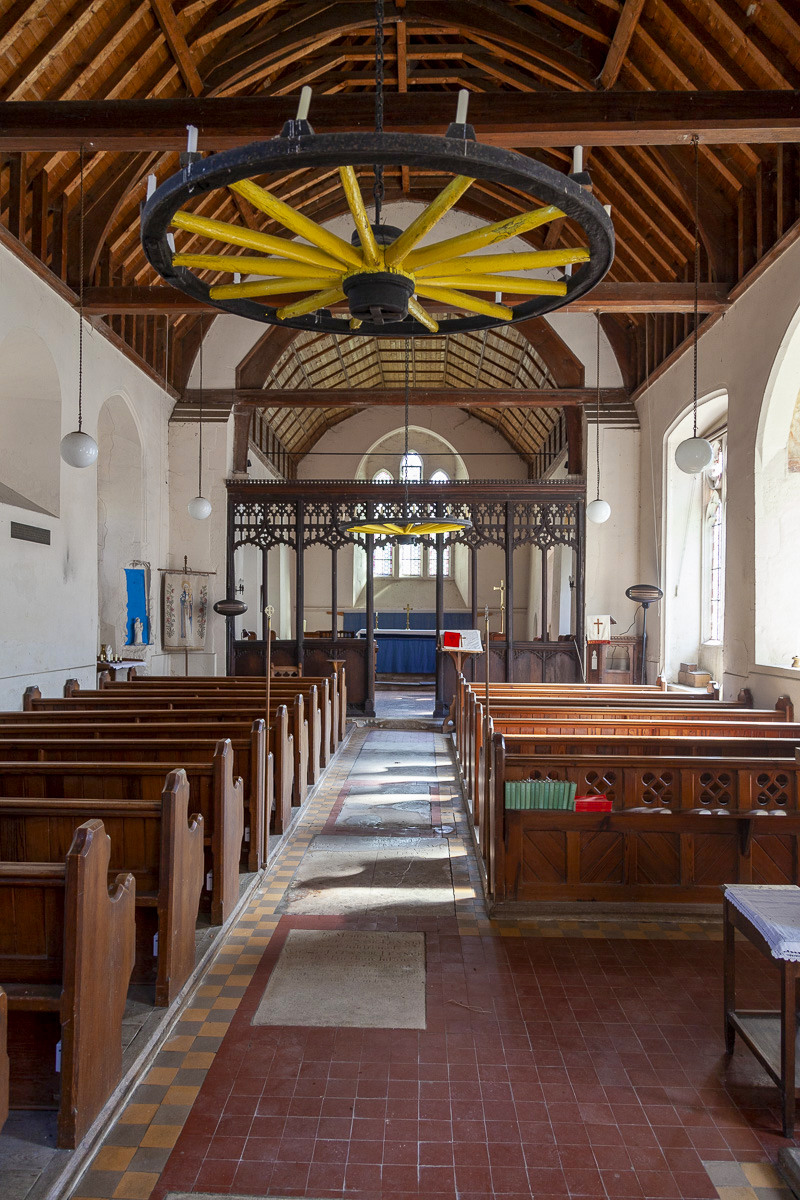

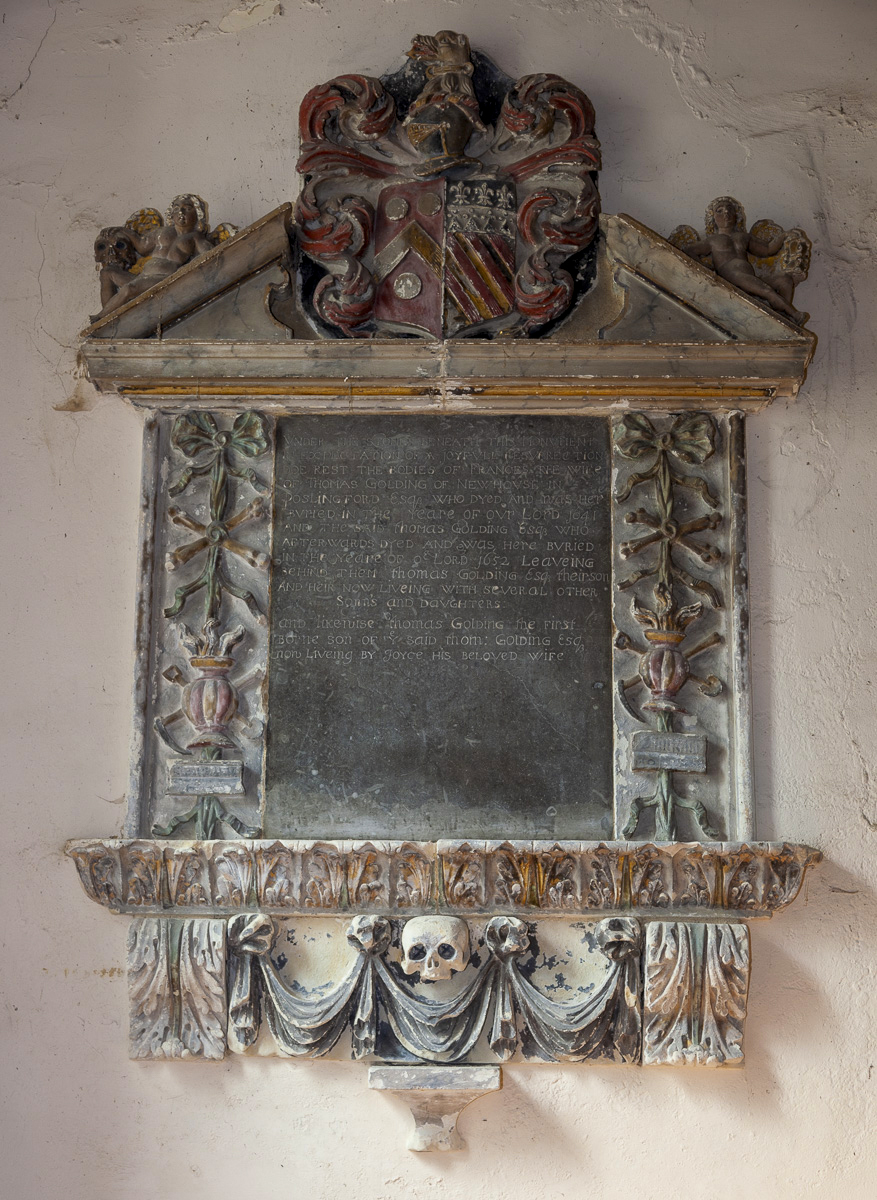

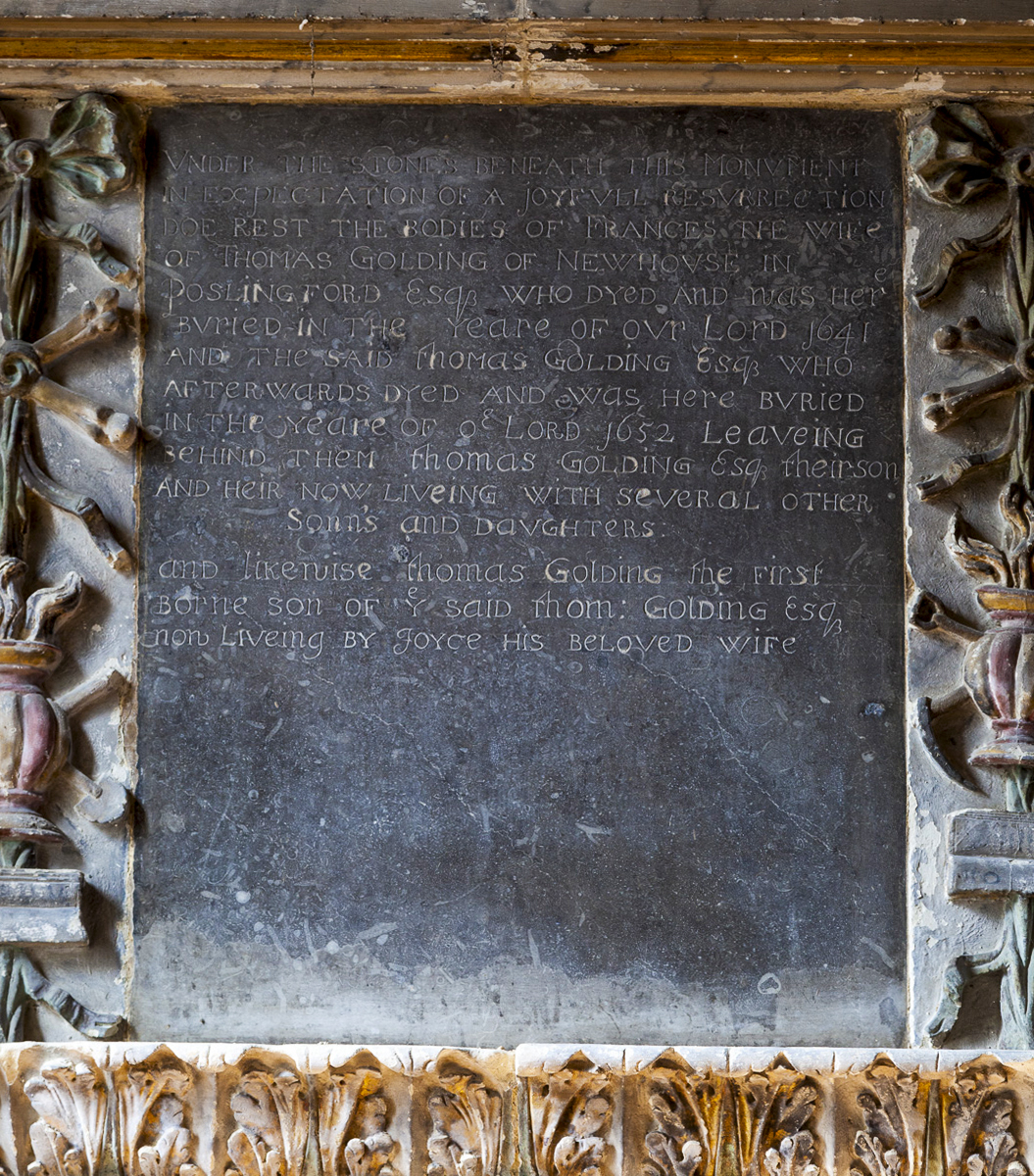

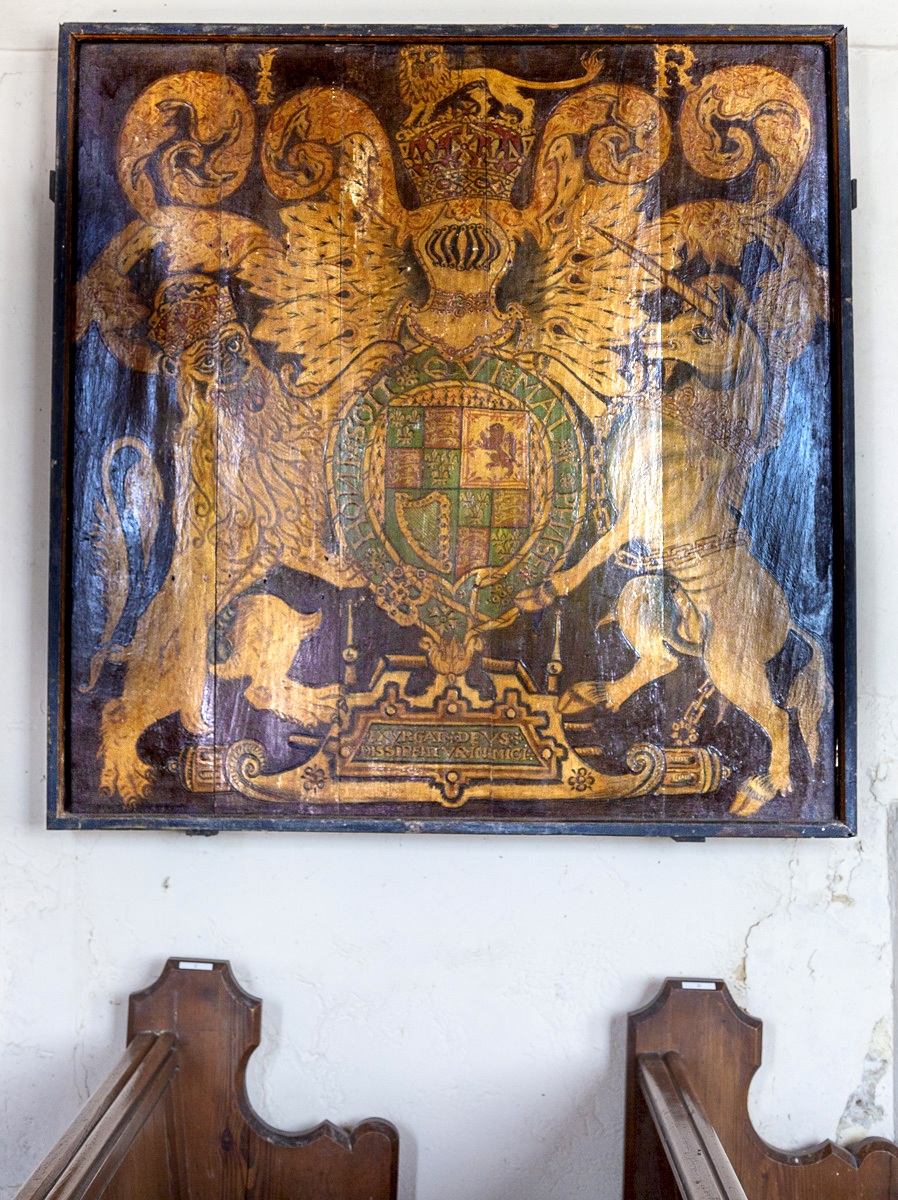

The Church of St Mary, near the centre of the village, is part of the Stour Valley Group of churches, and services are held there on a rotational basis. The Parish council meeting takes place in the church foyer as it is the only public place available in the village for such meetings to be held. The church holds a stone coffin and bell recovered from the site of Chipley Priory about 1 mile (2 km) north-west of the village. Both the priory and the church became part of the holdings of the College in Stoke-by-Clare.

== Poslingford Hall Manor ==
The Golding family were for several hundred years one of the principal families of the parish. As early as 1573 George and Henry Golding had been called upon to show by what title they held the Rectory of the church, and probably the manor was already in the family at that date. In 1635 Thomas Golding held the manor and the advowson. The family appear to have mostly resided in New House, which, despite its name, is a very old property – referred to in 1572 as "a messuage newly built called the Newhowse". Even then, it was not totally new because it was built on the site of the manor of Bustalmynes, named after John Burstemyn who was living in 1327. The property was further enhanced in the early 18th century by the Golding family, who constructed a garden canal and avenues within their small park there. The Goldings presented virtually every new Vicar to Poslingford church from 1563 to 1804. Several of this family are buried within the church. In the nave, on the West Wall is a monument to them. Mary (d.1699), daughter of Thomas Golding of New House, was married to Sir George Villiers, 2nd Bt., (1620 - 1682) a renowned Cavalier and nephew of George Villiers, 1st Duke of Buckingham, the favorite of King Charles I. Her tomb is in the floor of the church chancel.

== Today ==
The village was once self-sufficient, having a school, post office, small shop, a blacksmith and a public house, The Shepherd and Dog. These have all long closed and today most of the 200 or so residents travel to nearby towns for their requirements.
