= Stoke College =

Location
- Ashen Lane; Stoke-By-Clare; Sudbury, Suffolk, CO10 8JE; England; 52.0596°N 0.5387°E

Information
- Type: Other Independent School
- Motto: SUB HOC SIGNO VINCES
- Established: 1415
- Local authority: Suffolk
- Department for Education URN: 124865 Tables
- CEO: Mark Logan
- Gender: Coeducational
- Age: 11 to 18
- Enrolment: 200
- Houses: Lions & Unicorns
- Website: http://www.stokecollege.co.uk/

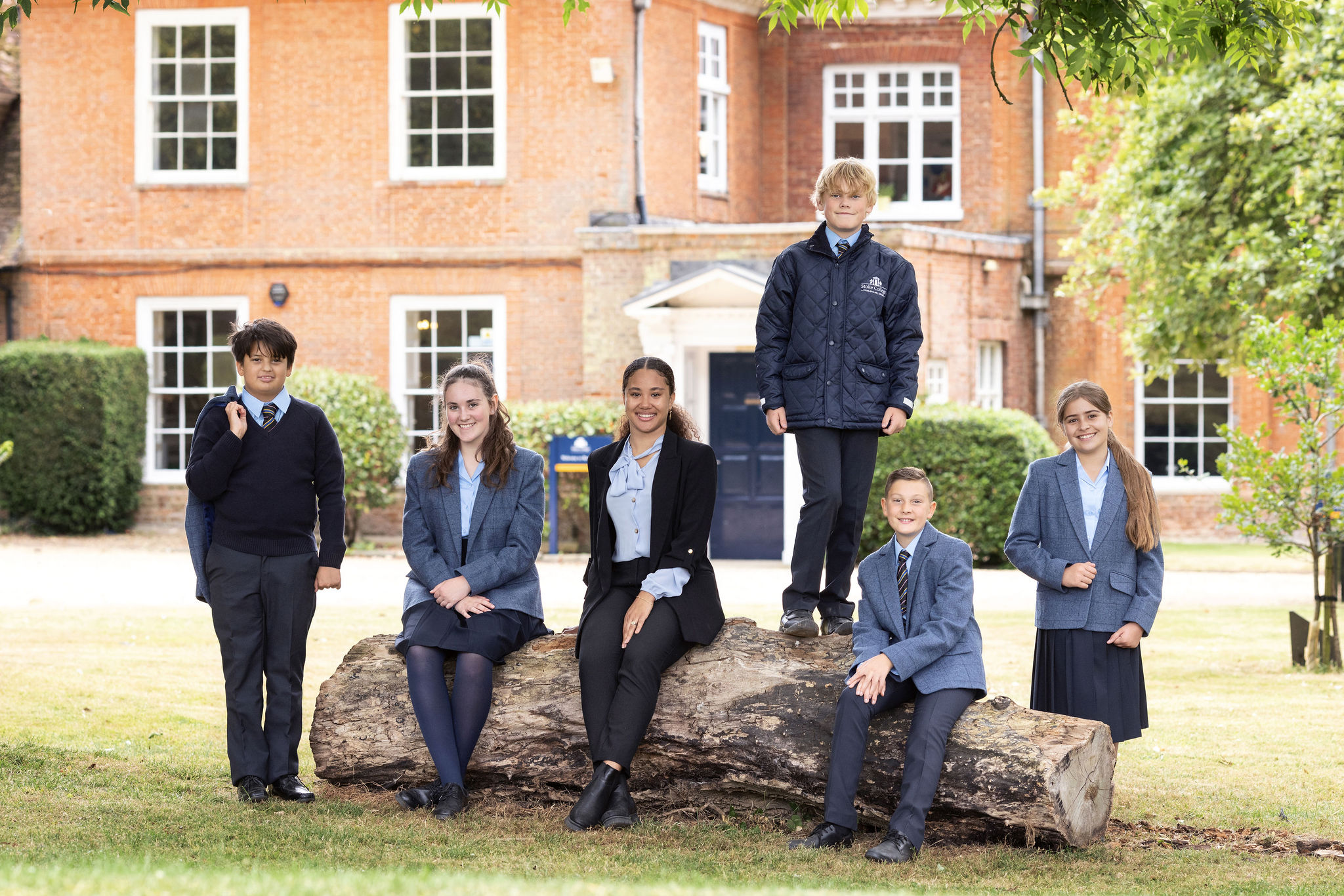

Stoke College in Stoke-by-Clare, near Clare, Suffolk, England, was a co-educational day school for children aged 11 to 18, with boarding for children aged 11 to 18. It was built on the site of a major medieval monastic college.

== History of the site ==
The college traces its name back to 1415, when a college for priests was founded on the site. The medieval College had been founded on the earlier site of a Benedictine priory, originally located in Clare Castle, but moved to Stoke-by-Clare in 1124. Under the patronage of the powerful de Clare family, it was one of the wealthiest monastic houses in Norman England, until a disastrous fire in the 1390s. The college annexed Chipley Priory in about 1468.

The last Dean was Matthew Parker, future Archbishop of Canterbury under Elizabeth I, and a founder of the Church of England. In 1534 Dr Walter Haddon, writing in a letter from Cambridge, says of the college "how that place seemed in a manner to be made on purpose for scholars, both to learn themselves, and to teach others: and that its situation was such that above all others it is best suited for honest and ingenious pleasures."

The buildings had been abandoned after the Dissolution of the monasteries in the 1540s; the site was bought by the Elwes family around 1660, who created the surviving main house and stables. The Elweses did not always keep the premises in fine style – one member of the family, John Elwes was so mean that he served as Dickens's model for Ebenezer Scrooge in A Christmas Carol.

The period of ownership by the Loch family, from 1897 until 1950, represents one of the most significant phases in the estate's modern history. Published local histories, including Stoke Between the Wars and R. Douglas Brown's A History of Stoke-by-Clare from 1548, record extensive architectural, infrastructural and social developments undertaken during the Loch era, many of which continue to shape both the estate and the village today.

The Stoke College Estate was purchased in 1897 by Henry Loch, 1st Baron Loch, following a distinguished imperial career that included service as Governor of Victoria, Governor of the Cape Colony and High Commissioner for Southern Africa. His acquisition of the estate marked the beginning of more than fifty years of ownership by the Loch family.

One of the most important developments during this period was the transformation of the house itself. Shortly after purchasing the estate, Lord and Lady Loch commissioned architectural work from Edwin Lutyens, then an emerging architect who would later become one of Britain's most celebrated designers. Lutyens, who was related to the family through Lady Loch, designed additions and alterations that substantially reshaped the house. These included the West Court, a bachelor's wing, a billiard room and other improvements which became integral elements of the building's character.

The grounds and gardens were also extensively developed during the Loch ownership. Contemporary local histories describe the creation of formal gardens, landscaped walks, water features and ornamental planting schemes. Lady Loch took a particular interest in horticulture and is credited with introducing a wide variety of plants and shrubs to the estate. Features such as the water garden, Japanese-inspired planting and extensive ornamental borders became defining elements of the landscape. The gardens were maintained by a considerable workforce and achieved a reputation extending beyond the village itself.

The Loch family also undertook significant infrastructure projects. Historical accounts record the construction of reservoirs, pumping systems and associated waterworks that enabled piped water to be supplied to Stoke College and much of Stoke-by-Clare. This represented a major improvement in local amenities and public health. Electric lighting was also introduced to the estate during this period, reflecting the family's commitment to modernisation.

Published village histories consistently portray the estate as a major source of employment for local people. Gardeners, grooms, domestic servants, estate workers, craftsmen and agricultural labourers were employed across the house, gardens and farms. The estate functioned not merely as a private residence but as an important economic institution within the village.

The Loch family were closely involved in community life. Local sources describe support for the parish church, village schools, charitable organisations and welfare initiatives. Lady Loch appears frequently in accounts of village activities, fundraising efforts and social events. Historical records note her involvement with nursing services, educational causes and numerous community projects. The family contributed towards the maintenance and improvement of local institutions and were active participants in parish affairs.

The estate also maintained connections that reflected the wider public and international careers of its owners. Visitors associated with public life, diplomacy and society were received at Stoke College. The family's experiences abroad influenced aspects of the gardens and planting schemes, adding an international dimension to what was otherwise a deeply rooted Suffolk estate.

Following the death of the 1st Baron Loch in 1900, the estate passed to his son, the 2nd Baron Loch. The family continued to develop Stoke College through the first half of the twentieth century. Despite the economic pressures that affected many country houses during and after the First World War, the estate remained a significant presence within village life. Further garden developments took place during the inter-war period, including the creation of the water garden in the 1920s.

The Second World War inevitably brought changes. Like many landed estates, Stoke College experienced reductions in staff and adjustments to traditional patterns of management. Nevertheless, local historical accounts suggest that the family's support for village institutions continued throughout this period.

Following the death of the 2nd Baron Loch in 1942, Lady Loch remained at Stoke College. Local histories indicate that she continued to reside there until 1950. After her departure, the house entered a new phase which ultimately led to its educational use. It was tenanted and later given as a school. Grenville College moved to the property in 1954 and later adopted the historic name Stoke College.

Published local histories attribute many of the estate's twentieth-century developments to the period of Loch ownership. Their stewardship saw the modernisation of the estate, the development of major infrastructure, the creation of notable gardens and sustained involvement in the social and economic life of Stoke-by-Clare. The surviving landscape, elements of the village infrastructure and much of the house's present character owe a considerable debt to the developments undertaken during their tenure.

Sources include Stoke Between the Wars and R. Douglas Brown, A History of Stoke-by-Clare from 1548, both published local histories documenting the development of Stoke-by-Clare and the Stoke College Estate during the late nineteenth and twentieth centuries.

In 1954 it became a small independent school, reviving the historic name "Stoke College" a few years later. It now serves around 200 pupils.

In 1961 the house became a Grade II* listed building.

== Recent history ==
'Grenville' was the name chosen for the small school which was founded in Clare a little over 50 years ago. It existed in the building known as 'The Norfolks' for a while before being acquired by Miss Elliot and Miss McLoad, who had previously been senior lecturers, training teachers at Bingley College in Yorkshire, in 1951. They became joint Principals.

This school was so successful that it quickly grew in size and new premises had to be found. The house recently vacated by the Loch family proved ideal and the school moved in 1954. In 1969, Miss Elliot retired and Martin Gedney became the first Headmaster of Stoke College. This was a time of great change and in 1973 it was decided that the name of the school should be changed to Stoke College.

== Notable alumni ==
- Henry Driver, Artist and Computer Game Developer, 2010
- Matt Cardle, singer and songwriter; winner of "The X Factor" in 2010
- Dr Matthew Olyver, celebrated contemporary composer.
