= College of Clare =

College in Stoke-by-Clare, Sufflok

The College of Clare was a college for priests at Stoke-by-Clare founded in 1415.

The College was founded on the earlier site of the Benedictine Stoke-by-Clare Priory. The college annexed Chipley Priory in about 1468.

It is now the site of Stoke College.

== Matthew Parker ==
In 1535 an evangelically minded Dean was appointed , Matthew Parker, Anne Boleyn's chaplain and the future Archbishop of Canterbury. He recast the college statutes away from the saying of chantry masses and towards preaching, observance of the office, and children's education.

After being summoned to the court of Anne Boleyn he became her chaplain. Through her influence he was appointed dean of the college of secular canons at Stoke-by-Clare in Suffolk in 1535, a post he held until 1547. The college had been secularised in 1514. The duties of the residents involved the regular performance of the offices of the church and prayers for the founder's family, but little direction was provided in the statutes for other times during the day, and there was little to do for the residents beyond their daily tasks and the education of the choirboys. It had come close to be acquired by Wolsey, but this had been prevented by the intervention of the Bishop of Norwich and Henry VIII's first wife, Catherine.

He retained his fellowship at Cambridge University whilst he was dean at Stoke-by-Clare. His biographer V.J.K. Brook commented that for Parker "his new post provided him with a happy and quiet place of retirement in the country to which he became devoted"; and allowed him to pursue his enthusiasm for education and the sponsorship of new buildings. At Stoke he transformed the college by introducing new statutes to ensure regular preaching occurred. Under Parker's deanship, scholars came from Cambridge to deliver lectures, greater care was taken over the education of the boy choristers, and a free grammar school for local boys was built within the precincts. His successful revitalisation of the college caused its reputation to spread, and he was able to protect it from being dissolved by citing the good work being done there; it retained its status until after Henry's death in 1547.

== Bibliography ==
- Brook, Victor John Knight (1962). A life of Archbishop Parker. Oxford: Clarendon Press. OCLC 1150229602.
- MacCulloch, Diarmaid (2018). Thomas Cromwell: A Life. Allen Lane. ISBN 9781846144295.
- Pollard, Albert Frederick (1911). "Parker, Matthew" . Encyclopædia Britannica. Vol. 20 (11th ed.). pp. 828–829.
