= Ruislip Priory =

Priory in Middlesex, England

Coordinates: 51.5787964°N 0.4273295°W

Ruislip Priory was a priory in Middlesex, England. In 1086 or 1087 the manor of Ruislip was given to Bec Abbey by Ernulf de Hesdin. An administrative centre, it had a priory before 1200. In the early 13th century the administration of Bec's manors (over 20) was shared with Ogbourne Priory in Wiltshire. As one of the alien priories, Ruislip shared their varying fortunes. Ruislip was always a manor-house rather than having conventual buildings. After 1404 the manors were reallocated, Ruislip going to St Nicolas College, Cambridge. St Nicolas College was later renamed King's College.

== Reading ==
- Marjorie Chibnall, The English Lands of the Abbey of Bec, Oxford University Press, Oxford, 1946.
