= Clare Town Hall, Suffolk =

Municipal building in Clare, Suffolk, England

Clare Town Hall
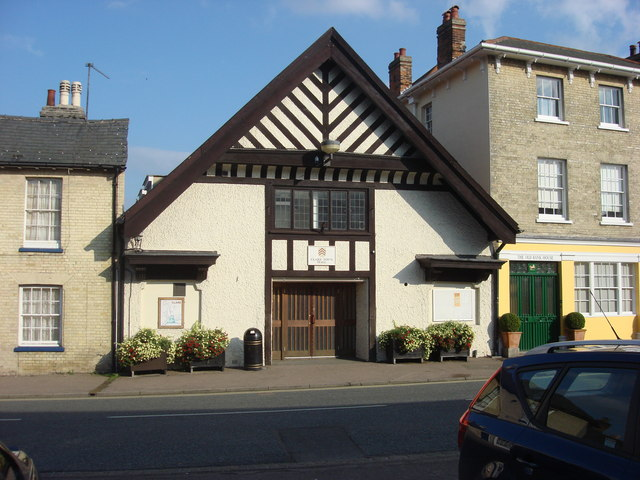
- The building in 2008

- Shown in Suffolk
- 52.0782°N 0.5817°E
- Location: Market Hill, Clare

History
- Built: 1913

Site notes
- Architectural style: Tudor style

Clare Town Hall is a municipal building in the town of Clare, Suffolk, in England. The building is currently used as a community events venue.

== History ==
The first building on the site was a structure known as the market cross which dated from the 16th century. There were two rooms on the first floor of the building, which were endowed by the local tradesman and philanthropist, William Cadge of Bochards Farm, and made available for use as a free school in 1668.

By the early 1830s, the market cross was dilapidated, and civic leaders decided to commission a corn exchange for the town. The new building, designed by James Fenner, was completed in 1838. The use of the building as a corn exchange declined significantly in the wake of the Great Depression of British Agriculture in the late 19th century.

In the early 20th century, civic leaders decided that the old corn exchange should be demolished and replaced by a town hall for community use, as part of the celebrations for the coronation of George V. The structure was rebuilt in brick with a cement render finish, to a design by Percy Monroe Beaumont, at cost £1,317, and then re-opened as a town hall in 1913. The design involved a symmetrical main frontage of three bays facing onto Market Hill. The outer bays contained doorways flanked by pilasters surmounted by brackets supporting cornices. The central bay was fenestrated by five-part mullioned windows on both floors and there was extensive half-timbering installed in the gable above. St Edmundsbury Borough Council have described the structure as "a unique building... of a traditional style with the front elevation of render and dark stained timber with a large overhanging gable". It is the only building on Market Hill in the town which is not listed.

Internally, the principal room was an assembly hall, which was 45.3 feet (13.8 m) long and 33 feet (10 m) wide, featured a sprung dance floor, and had seating capacity of 300 people; there were various rooms for council meetings. The building was primarily used for parish level meetings; the local rural district council was based at Stonehall in Nethergate Street.

Extensive alterations to main frontage, including the replacement of the doorways in the outer bays with a new opening in the central bay, were introduced when the building was refurbished in 1988. Since then it has continued to be used for craft fairs and other community events.
