= Ancient House, Clare =

Medieval building and museum in Suffolk, England

Coordinates: 52.0788°N 0.5808°E

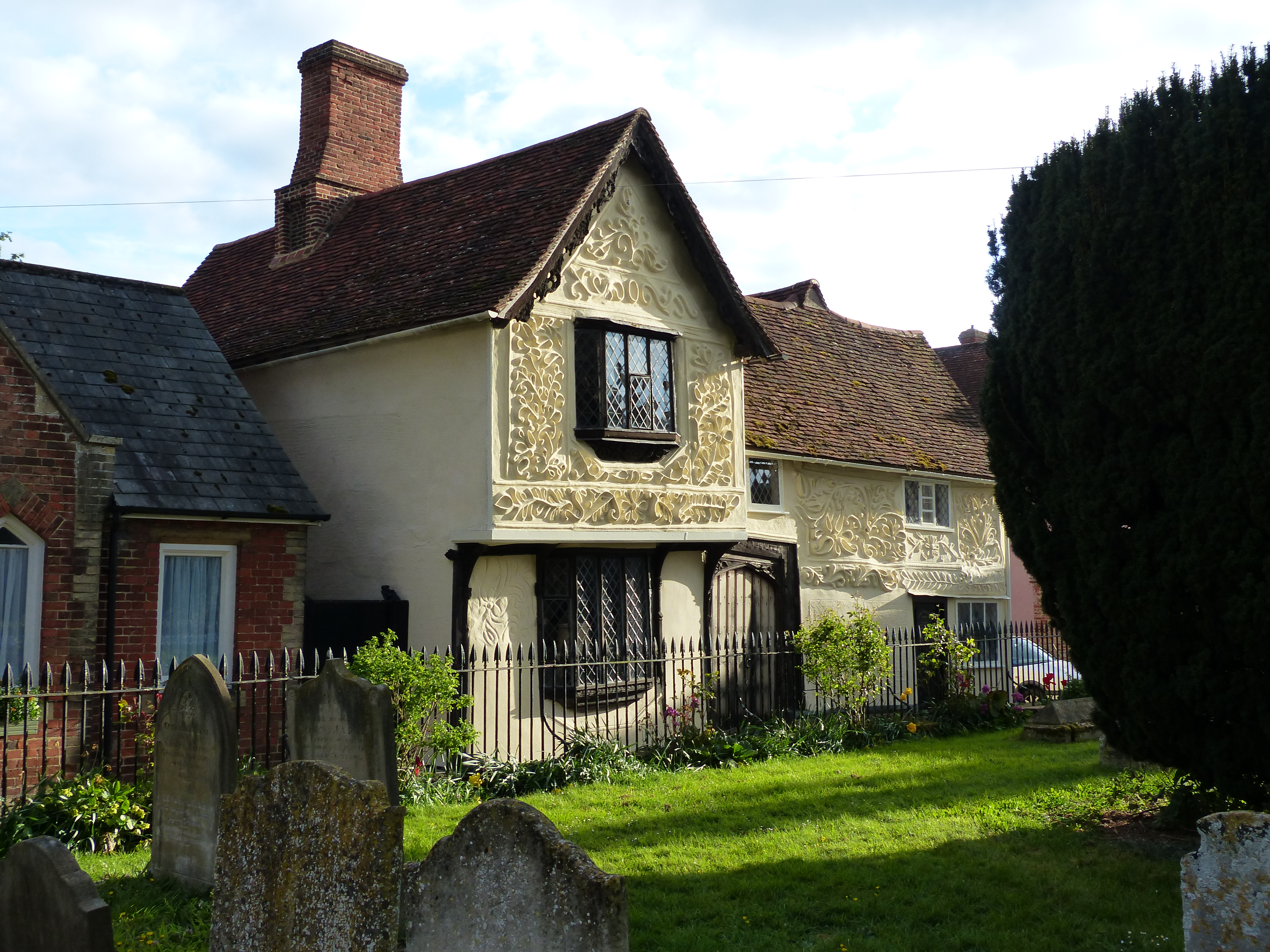
The Ancient House

The Ancient House is a medieval timber-framed and partly pargeted building located in Clare in Suffolk, England. It is a Grade I listed building.

== History ==
The oldest part of the building is the west wing, dating from the 14th century, whilst the heavily decorated east wing is believed to have been built in 1473. The house features a moulded timber ceiling in one of the ground floor rooms and some elaborately carved oriel windows. It is mentioned in a will dating to 1502.

The Ancient House was acquired in the early 1930s by a local farmer, Charles W. Byford, in order to prevent its removal to the United States. It was then gifted in 1938 to Clare Parish Council to put to "a useful public purpose". A museum was established by the council in 1979. In the 1990s it was re-designed with grants and help from the Heritage Lottery Fund, St Edmundsbury District Council, and the Landmark Trust. It is now preserved as part Landmark holiday accommodation and part museum.
