= Stour Valley Community School =

Location
- Cavendish Road; Clare, Suffolk, CO10 8PJ; England; 52.0801°N 0.5897°E

Information
- Type: Free school
- Established: 2011
- Department for Education URN: 136757 Tables
- Ofsted: Reports
- Head teacher: Rachel Kelly
- Gender: Coeducational
- Age: 11 to 16
- Website: stourvalleycommunityschool.org

Stour Valley Community School is a coeducational free school for pupils aged 11 to 16 in Clare in the English county of Suffolk. It opened in September 2011 as one of the first 24 free schools in England. It opened with around 170 pupils and a total staff of 29, including non-teaching support staff. The headteacher is Rachel Kelly.

The school opened on the site of the former Clare Middle School which had around 300 pupils in four year groups. A building programme estimated to cost around £4.8 million and take around a year to complete and carried out by Balfour Beatty. The middle school closed in August 2011 as part of Suffolk County Council's reorganisation of schools into a two-tier system.

At the beginning of the autumn term (starting in September) of 2026, the school had 569 pupils, out of a nominal capacity of 575.

== History ==
Local families formed a group called Campaign for Local And Rural Education (C.L.A.R.E) asking for the council to open a secondary school at the site, but the council refused. The group then set up the Stour Valley Educational Trust, and applied directly to the national government to open a school, concerned that children would have to travel up to 10 miles (16 km) to one of two existing secondary schools with around 1,200 pupils. The application was accepted, and the trust, operating as Stour Valley Educational Trust Ltd., opened the school on the old middle school site in September 2011.

== Criticisms ==
The trust, which opened the school with around 170 pupils, had initially expected over 200 pupils to attend the school in its first year and planned for more than 500 pupils by 2015. The school has been criticised as unnecessary, for wasting taxpayers' money and for its possible impact on surrounding high schools. In 2011 the school spent £28,000 on marketing. The trust has stated that teachers will "have to teach two subjects and bring something else (to the school) as well". The school catchment area is predominantly made up of households in the "wealthy achiever" category, the most well off category, despite the free school programme being aimed at increasing social mobility.
