= Pargeting =

Decorative or waterproof plaster applied to building walls

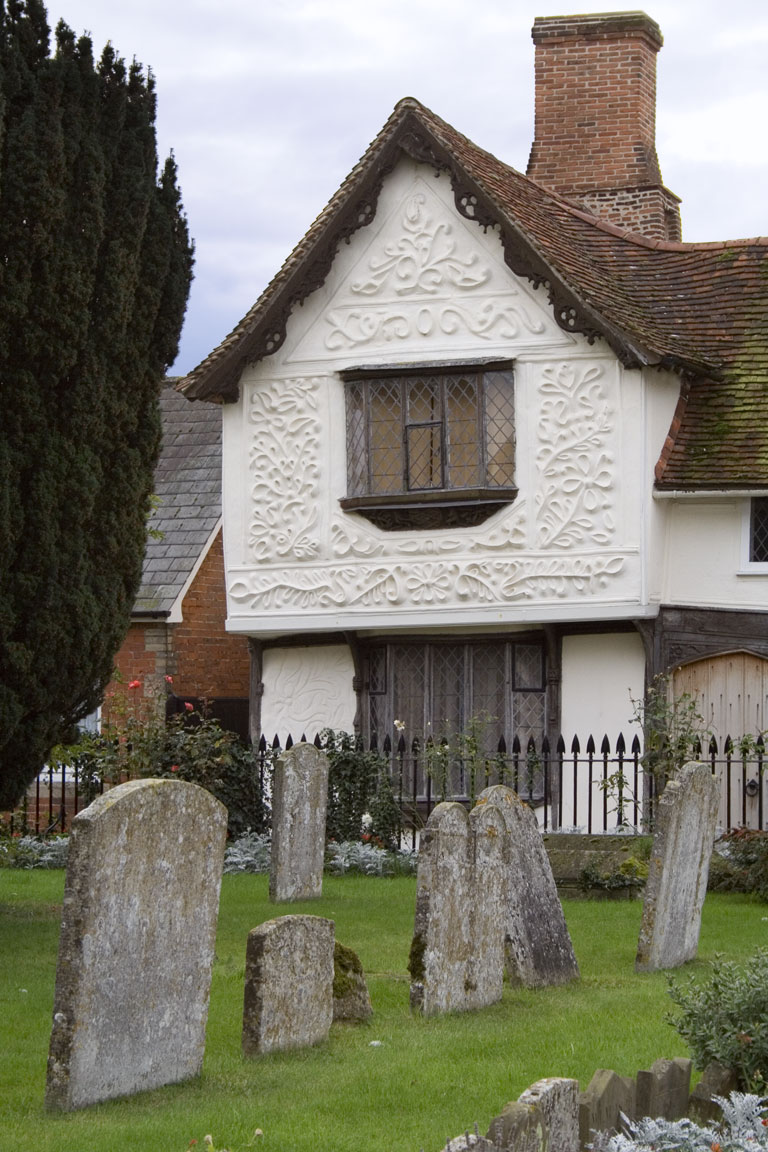
Pargeting on the upper wall of the County Museum in Clare, Suffolk.

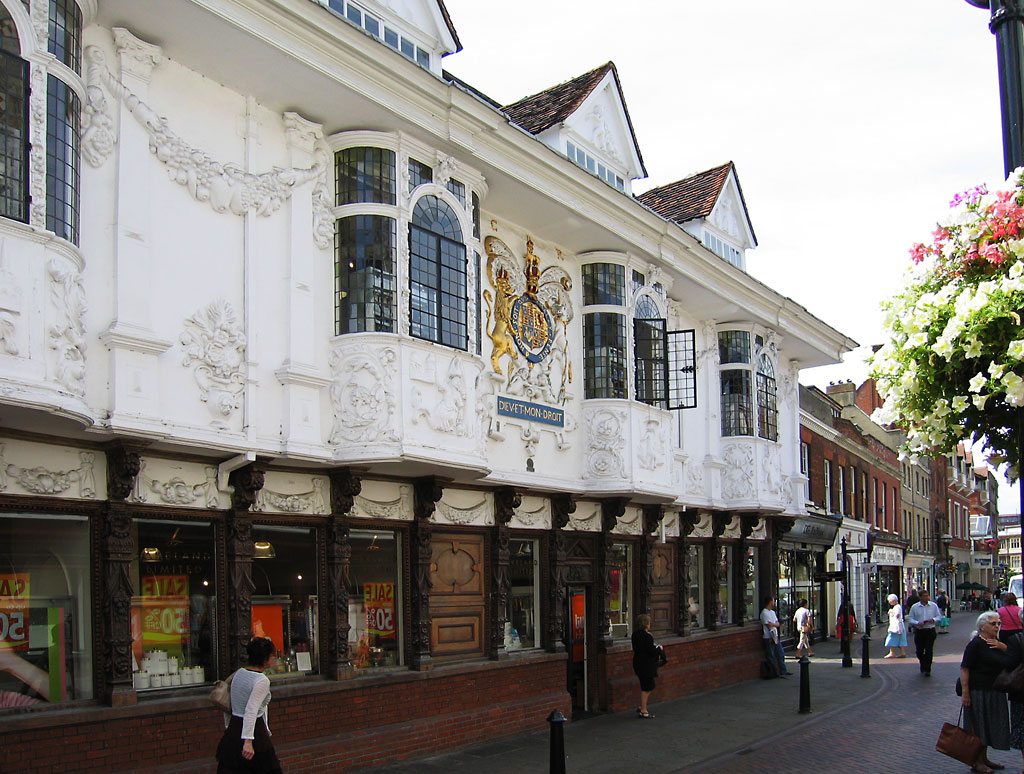
The Ancient House in Ipswich has a particularly fine example of pargeting, depicting scenes from the four continents. When the hall was built in 1670, Australia and Antarctica had not yet been discovered by Europeans, and the Americas were considered a single continent.

Pargeting (or sometimes called Wall pargetting) is a decorative or waterproof plastering applied to building walls. The term, if not the practice, is particularly associated with the English counties of Suffolk and Essex. In the neighbouring county of Norfolk, the term "pinking" is used.

Patrick Leigh Fermor describes similar decorations on pre-World War II buildings in Linz, Austria. "Pargeted façades rose up, painted chocolate, green, purple, cream and blue. They were adorned with medallions in high relief and the stone and plaster scroll-work gave them a feeling of motion and flow."

Pargeting derives from the word 'parget', a Middle English term that is probably derived from the Old French pargeter or parjeter, to throw about, or porgeter, to roughcast a wall. However, the term is more usually applied only to the decoration in relief of the plastering between the studwork on the outside of half-timber houses, or sometimes covering the whole wall.

The devices were stamped on the wet plaster. This seems generally to have been done by sticking a number of pins in a board in certain lines or curves, and then pressing on the wet plaster in various directions, so as to form geometrical figures. Sometimes these devices are in relief, and in the time of Elizabeth I of England represent figures, birds and foliage. Fine examples can be seen at Ipswich, Maidstone, and Newark-on-Trent.

The term is also applied to the lining of the inside of smoke flues to form an even surface for the passage of the smoke.

== See also ==
- Harl
- Parge coat
- Plasterwork
- Yeseria
