= Chipley Priory =

Augustine religious house in Suffolk, England

Coordinates: 52.1184°N 0.5726°E

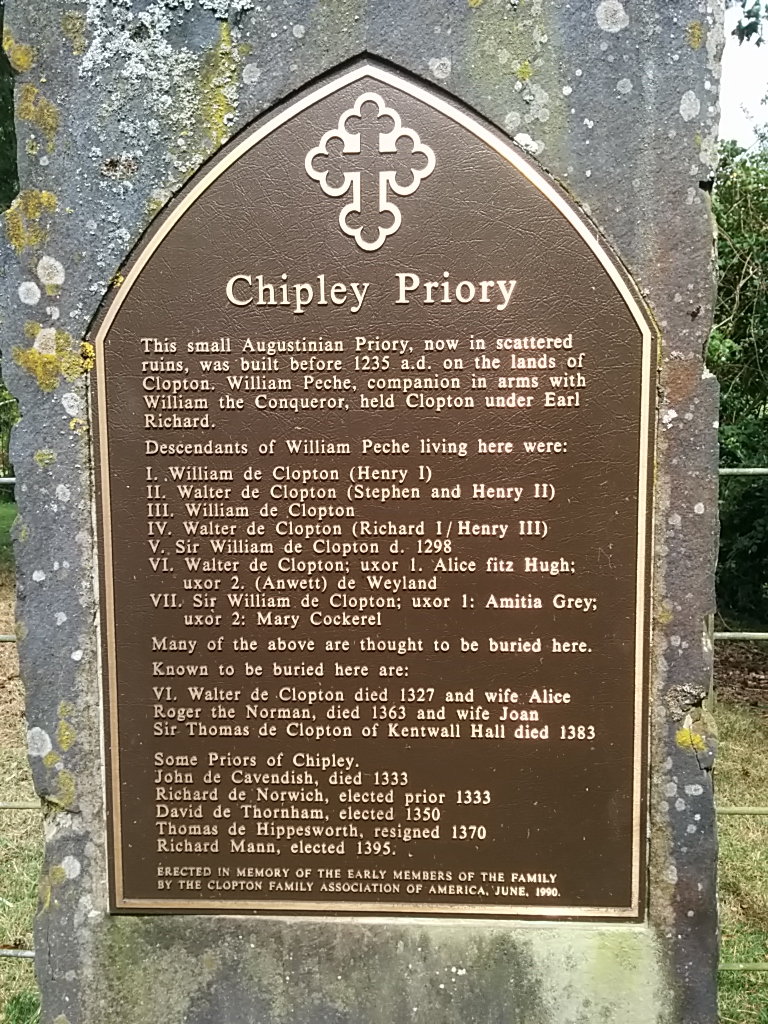
A plaque listing occupants, burials and priors of Chipley Priory

Chipley Priory was a small Augustine religious house, dedicated to the Blessed Virgin, located about 1 mile (2 km) north-west of the village of Poslingford in the English county of Suffolk. The date of its foundation is unknown and the first references to it occur in 1235. The priory never became a major house – a taxation roll from 1291 shows its income at less than £5 per annum – and by 1455 the buildings were ruins. By 1468 the Bishop of Norwich allowed the lands to be annexed by the College at Stoke-next-Clare.

The site is occupied by a 17th-century farmhouse which incorporates some medieval building material believed to come from the priory buildings. The priory church is believed to have been destroyed in 1818 and human remains and other artifacts have been recovered from the site, with a stone coffin and bell kept at Poslingford Church.

A plaque erected on the site in 1990 by the Clopton Family Association, lists information about the occupants, burials and priors of the priory.
