= Stoke-by-Clare =

Village in Suffolk, England

Coordinates: 52.063°N 0.538°E

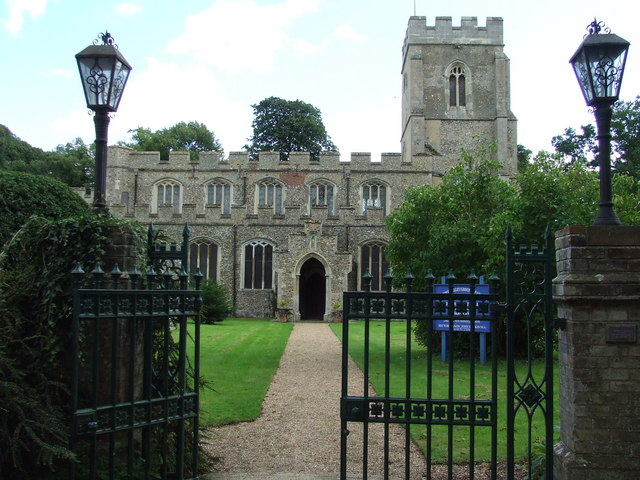
- St. John the Baptist church, Stoke by Clare

- Location within Suffolk
- Population: 512 (2011 Census)
- Civil parish: Stoke-by-Clare
- District: West Suffolk
- Shire county: Suffolk
- Region: East
- Country: England
- Sovereign state: United Kingdom
- Post town: Sudbury
- Postcode district: CO10
- Dialling code: 01787
- UK Parliament: West Suffolk

Stoke-by-Clare is a village and civil parish in the West Suffolk district, in Suffolk, England located in the valley of the River Stour, about two miles west of Clare. In 2011 the parish had a population of 512.

In 1124 Richard de Clare, 1st Earl of Hertford, moved the Benedictine Priory that had been established at his castle in Clare to Stoke-by-Clare. The Priory, which was controlled by the monastery of Bec in Normandy, enjoyed by 1291 rents from 17 parishes in Suffolk. During the Hundred Years' War the Priory's revenues were in part diverted to the English crown and in 1415 the Priory was replaced by Stoke College, intended to support a small community of priests and choristers under the patronage of Edmund Mortimer, 5th Earl of March, who was also buried here.

The village is home to the Elwes Baronetcy which was created in 1660 by King Charles II for Gervase Elwes, Member of Parliament for Sudbury and Suffolk.

At the time of the English Reformation, the Dean of the college was Matthew Parker. Under his authority the College became a centre of the 'New Learning' and reforms brought him into conflict with the Priory at Clare. The college was suppressed in 1548 and the estate was purchased by John Cheke and Walter Mildmay. The reputed miser Sir Hervey Elwes lived here in the 18th century and was succeeded by his nephew John Elwes (politician) in 1763. Major-General Edward Loch, 2nd Baron Loch CB CMG MVO DSO, a senior British Army officer, is buried in the churchyard of St John the Baptist and there is memorial to him within the church.

At the 2011 census the population of Stoke-by-Clare was recorded as 512. Its church, St John the Baptist, houses Matthew Parker's pulpit. There are also several unique wall paintings one of which is said to date to the reign of Mary I.

Stoke College is now an independent school for 11-18 year olds. The village formerly had a railway station on the Stour Valley Railway.

== Notable residents ==
- Gilbert Fitz Richard (c1066-c1117), 2nd feudal baron of Clare and founder of the local Cluniac priory
- Matthew Parker (1504-1575), clergyman and Archbishop of Canterbury in the Church of England from 1559 until his death in 1575.
