= Wilsford Priory =

Former Benedictine alien priory in Lincolnshire, England

Wilsford Priory was a Benedictine alien priory in Wilsford, Lincolnshire, England.

== History ==
The manor on which it was built was presented to the abbey of Le Bec Hellouin in Normandy, by Hugh Wake under Stephen, King of England (reigned 1135–1155).

In 1324, the Prior of Wilsford had to swear that he would conduct himself faithfully towards the King and not send money or goods out of the realm, or leave it without licence. However, the house revenue in 1380 was so small that after dues had been paid of 22 marks, there was too little left to support the Prior and he was pardoned for two years' arrears of payment.

Some time in the reign of Edward III of England (1327–1377), the Priory was granted to Thomas Holland, 2nd Earl of Kent (1350–1397), a descendant of Hugh Wake. Through him the property was finally passed to Bourne Abbey in 1401.
