= Priory Cottages, Steventon =

Former monastic grange at Steventon, Oxfordshire, England

Coordinates: 51.618896°N 1.32823°W

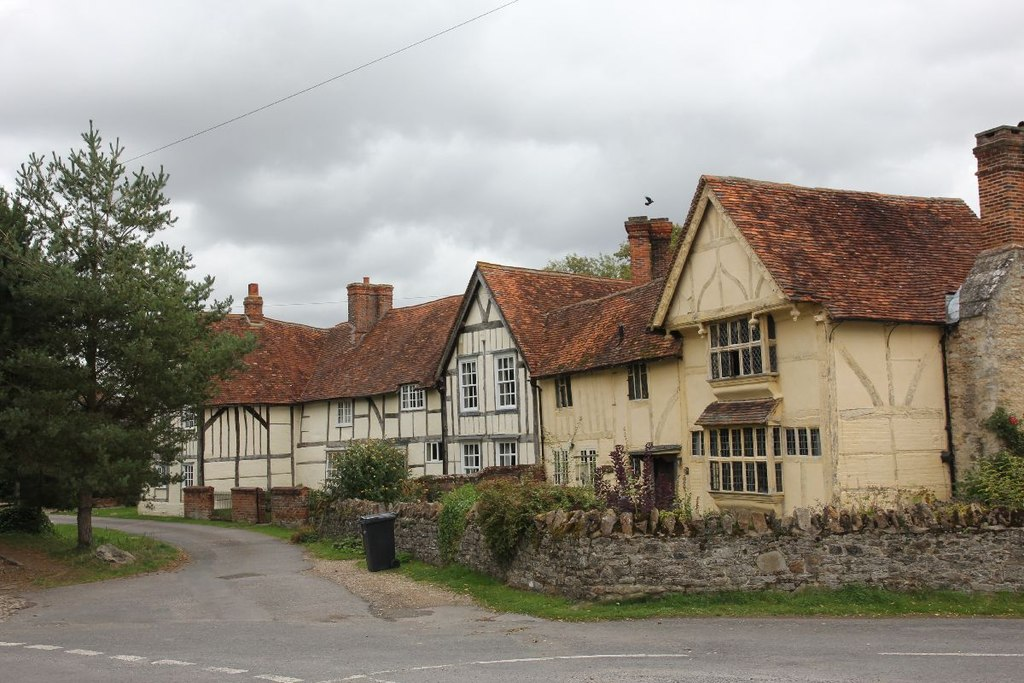
Priory Cottages

Priory Cottages (formerly Steventon Priory) is a 14th-century manor house and former monastic grange which had the status of a priory at Steventon in the English county of Oxfordshire (formerly Berkshire).

King Henry I gave the manor of Steventon to the priory of Notre-Dame de Bonne-Nouvelle in Rouen, a cell of the Abbey of Bec in Normandy. It therefore became a cell of Bec and was given the status of a priory. However, a priory church and associated buildings were never built there. It always remained just a monastic grange, the building now called Priory Cottages, served by one or two monks. By the late 14th century, it was leased out to tenants. Later it belonged to Westminster Abbey.

The building is constructed around a central courtyard and its mighty hammer-beam is of architectural interest. It is also said to have a priest’s bolthole in the chimney.

In 1939 the cottages were endowed to the National Trust by a group of women philanthropists called Ferguson’s Gang. Ferguson’s Gang kept their identities secret and attracted publicity for the National Trust by delivering funds in spectacular ways. In July 1939 they invaded the National Trust’s AGM with what was reported to be ‘A Benificent Bomb’ but which was in fact a metal pineapple containing £100, which was their second down-payment for Priory Cottages. The five women of Ferguson’s Gang intended to use the cottages as their own living space but their plans were thwarted by the start of World War II, and the cottages are now tenanted privately.

The public can visit the cottages by written appointment with the tenant.
