= Ogbourne Priory =

Benedictine priory in Wiltshire, England

Coordinates: 51.46°N 1.72°W

Ogbourne Priory was a priory in Wiltshire, England, from the 12th century until the early 15th.

There may have been a priory building in the 13th century, perhaps attached to the manor house at either Ogbourne St Andrew or Ogbourne St George; both manors belonged to the Benedictine monastery Bec Abbey, Normandy. Later the priory existed only as a legal name for the administration of the Bec estates in England. The last Prior of Ogbourne, William de St. Vaast, died in 1404 or 1405 and the properties were dispersed.

== Sources ==
- Pugh, R.B.; Crittall, Elizabeth (eds.). "Victoria County History: Wiltshire: Vol 3. Alien houses: Priory of Ogbourne". British History Online. University of London.
- Historic England. "Ogbourne Priory (221556)". Research records (formerly PastScape).
