= Stour =

Stour may refer to:

- River Stour (disambiguation), several rivers
- HMS Stour, a Royal Navy River-class destroyer purchased in 1909
- PS Stour (1864)
- PS Stour (1878)
- Stour-class destroyer, the sub-class of Royal Navy destroyers of which HMS Stour was the lead ship
- Stour (narrowboat), a canalboat at the Black Country Living Museum, England

== See also ==
- East Stour (disambiguation)
- Papa Stour
- Stour Brook
- Stour Row
- Stour Valley (disambiguation)
- West Stour (disambiguation)
