= Listed buildings in Stratford St Mary =

Civil Parish in Suffolk, England

Stratford St Mary is a village and civil parish in the Babergh District of Suffolk, England. It contains 33 listed buildings that are recorded in the National Heritage List for England. Of these one is grade I, two are grade II* and 30 are grade II.

This list is based on the information retrieved online from Historic England.

== Key ==
Grade	Criteria
I	Buildings that are of exceptional interest
II*	Particularly important buildings of more than special interest
II	Buildings that are of special interest

== Listing ==
Name	Grade	Location	Type	Completed (Note: The date given is the date used by Historic England as significant for the initial building or that of an important part in the structure's description.)	Date designated	Grid ref. (Note: The grid reference is based on the British national grid reference system, sometimes known as OSGB36, used by the Ordnance Survey.) Geo-coordinates	Notes	Entry number (Note: The "List Entry Number" is a unique number assigned to each listed building and scheduled monument by Historic England.)	Image	Wikidata
Clock House	II	Billy's Lane, Stratford St. Mary			5 June 1987	TM0502235167; 51°58′38″N 0°59′02″E		1036989	Upload Photo	Q26288668
Haywards Cottage	II	Dedham Road, Stratford St. Mary			5 June 1987	TM0545734491; 51°58′15″N 0°59′23″E		1036990	Upload Photo	Q26288669
Ravenys	II	Dedham Road, Stratford St. Mary			22 February 1955	TM0554634407; 51°58′12″N 0°59′27″E		1198518	Upload Photo	Q26494547
Teazles	II	Dedham Road, Stratford St. Mary			22 February 1955	TM0543634482; 51°58′15″N 0°59′22″E		1198535	Upload Photo	Q26494563
Whalleys	II	Dedham Road, Stratford St. Mary			22 February 1955	TM0563634114; 51°58′03″N 0°59′31″E		1351598	Upload Photo	Q26634685
Lowe Hill House	II*	Higham Road, Stratford St. Mary	house		22 February 1955	TM0425135021; 51°58′34″N 0°58′21″E		1036991	Lowe Hill House More images	Q17533215
Holly House	II	7 and 8, Lower Street, Stratford St. Mary			5 June 1987	TM0427533891; 51°57′57″N 0°58′20″E		1036992	Upload Photo	Q26288670
9, Lower Street	II	9, Lower Street, Stratford St. Mary			22 February 1955	TM0427733881; 51°57′57″N 0°58′20″E		1198556	Upload Photo	Q26494582
Bay House	II	Lower Street, Stratford St. Mary			22 February 1955	TM0427833864; 51°57′57″N 0°58′20″E		1198562	Upload Photo	Q26494588
Clematis Cottage	II	Lower Street, Stratford St. Mary			22 February 1955	TM0427633875; 51°57′57″N 0°58′20″E		1036993	Upload Photo	Q26288671
Corner House	II	Lower Street, Stratford St. Mary			22 February 1955	TM0425534329; 51°58′12″N 0°58′20″E		1198570	Upload Photo	Q26494596
Milepost Approximately 50 Metres South of Corner House	II	Lower Street, Stratford St. Mary			5 June 1987	TM0427134272; 51°58′10″N 0°58′20″E		1036994	Upload Photo	Q26288674
Nelsons Cottage Rosebank Side Cottage	II	Lower Street, Stratford St. Mary			5 June 1987	TM0424433932; 51°57′59″N 0°58′18″E		1283789	Upload Photo	Q26572611
The Black Horse	II	Lower Street, Stratford St. Mary	pub		26 January 1967	TM0427833850; 51°57′56″N 0°58′20″E		1351600	The Black Horse More images	Q26634687
The Swan Inn	II	Lower Street, Stratford St. Mary	pub		22 February 1955	TM0430934190; 51°58′07″N 0°58′22″E		1351599	The Swan Inn More images	Q26634686
Valley House	II	Lower Street, Stratford St. Mary			22 February 1955	TM0430834088; 51°58′04″N 0°58′22″E		1198552	Upload Photo	Q26494578
Weavers House	II*	Lower Street, Stratford St. Mary	house		22 February 1955	TM0426033820; 51°57′55″N 0°58′19″E		1351601	Weavers House More images	Q17534517
Church Cottage	II	B1029, Stratford St. Mary			5 June 1987	TM0520934638; 51°58′20″N 0°59′10″E		1036988	Upload Photo	Q26288666
Church of St Mary	I	B1029, Stratford St. Mary	church building		22 February 1955	TM0522134610; 51°58′19″N 0°59′11″E		1283820	Church of St Mary More images	Q17542281
Hill House	II	B1029, Stratford St. Mary			5 June 1987	TM0541535034; 51°58′33″N 0°59′22″E		1036987	Upload Photo	Q26288665
Leatherjacket Farmhouse	II	A12, Stratford St. Mary			22 February 1955	TM0562135491; 51°58′47″N 0°59′34″E		1198460	Upload Photo	Q26494490
The Gables	II	B1029, Stratford St. Mary			22 February 1955	TM0523734660; 51°58′21″N 0°59′12″E		1198471	Upload Photo	Q26494501
Idle Waters, the Island	II	The Island, Lower Street, Stratford St. Mary			19 April 1977	TM0420933518; 51°57′45″N 0°58′15″E		1198589	Upload Photo	Q26494385
Ancient House Priest's House	II	Upper Street, Stratford St. Mary	house		22 February 1955	TM0465934321; 51°58′11″N 0°58′41″E		1198607	Ancient House Priest's House More images	Q26494403
Cottage Opposite Garden of the Orchard	II	Upper Street, Stratford St. Mary			5 June 1987	TM0439834324; 51°58′11″N 0°58′27″E		1036955	Upload Photo	Q26288630
Courtlands	II	Upper Street, Stratford St. Mary			5 June 1987	TM0465634306; 51°58′10″N 0°58′41″E		1036997	Upload Photo	Q26288677
Gatemans	II	Upper Street, Stratford St. Mary			22 February 1955	TM0464234314; 51°58′11″N 0°58′40″E		1198612	Upload Photo	Q26494408
Hayling Cottage the Beams	II	Upper Street, Stratford St. Mary			5 June 1987	TM0446634317; 51°58′11″N 0°58′31″E		1198619	Upload Photo	Q26494414
Kennel Cottage Post Office	II	Upper Street, Stratford St. Mary			22 February 1955	TM0468434361; 51°58′12″N 0°58′42″E		1283756	Upload Photo	Q26572582
Kings Arms	II	Upper Street, Stratford St. Mary			22 February 1955	TM0427534344; 51°58′12″N 0°58′21″E		1036996	Upload Photo	Q26288676
Poynings	II	Upper Street, Stratford St. Mary			5 June 1987	TM0479734450; 51°58′15″N 0°58′48″E		1036995	Upload Photo	Q26288675
The Old Kennels	II	Upper Street, Stratford St. Mary			5 June 1987	TM0464634341; 51°58′11″N 0°58′40″E		1351602	Upload Photo	Q26634688
Waterloo House	II	Upper Street, Stratford St. Mary			5 June 1987	TM0449534306; 51°58′11″N 0°58′32″E		1351623	Upload Photo	Q26634708

== See also ==
- Grade I listed buildings in Suffolk
- Grade II* listed buildings in Suffolk

== Sources ==
- Bettely, James; Pevsner, Nikolaus (2015) [1961], Suffolk: West, The Buildings of England, New Haven and London: Yale University Press, ISBN 978-0-300-19655-9
