= River Stour Trust =

English river charity

The River Stour Trust is a registered charity and waterway restoration group. It was founded in 1968 to protect and enhance the right of the public to navigate the River Stour, Suffolk, England. It is led by volunteers who are dedicated to its aims and objectives of restoring the navigation from Sudbury to the Sea (a distance of approximately 24.5 miles/37 km).

Since its formation, the Trust has restored Flatford and Dedham Locks, Flatford Barge Dock (in association with the National Trust), rescued an original River Stour lighter, and restored the Quay Basin, Gasworks Cut and 19th century Granary Building, which has become the headquarters for the Trust. In 1997, the Trust opened the new Millennium Lock at Great Cornard (creating through navigation from Sudbury to Great Henny) and in 2007, opened its new Visitor & Education Centre (adjacent to Cornard Lock) to offer facilities for visiting schools, other groups and the local community.

Since 2007, Griff Rhys Jones, the well-known actor, director, writer and producer, has been a Vice President of the River Stour Trust. He says, "I am a strong supporter of the River Stour Trust and everything to do with it. The riverway is so beautiful and unspoilt, especially with the wildlife and water-lilies and bullrushes, it is just terrific. It is a great example of why rivers should be open to people...I salute the River Stour Trust for opening the locks...it is supposed to be a river that traffic travels on.”

== Boating on the River Stour ==
The River Stour is a statutory navigation and a right to travel by boat along the whole river is still preserved. Almost half of the river is now re-opened for use as a through navigation for boats (from Sudbury to Great Henny on the upper reach and from Stratford St Mary to Brantham on the lower reach). However, the remaining locks, which provided through navigation on the unrestored central section, are largely derelict or have disappeared, and the Trust continues to work towards restoring these and other obstacles to enable boats to navigate the whole river.

Bylaws provide that from Ballingdon bridge (Sudbury) to Great Henny, boats with engines may be used, but are subject to a strict speed limit of 4 mph, which does not create wash or damage to the banks. However, boats with engines are precluded from using the river below Great Henny, unless they were licensed at the time of the Anglian Water Authority Act 1977 (c. i). Currently, only boats light enough to maneuver around many the obstacles may use the river below Great Henny. This restricts most of the river to canoes although, even for such small craft, the river is not sufficiently navigable to allow easy passage along its entire lower section.

River Stour Trust volunteers offer boat trips from Easter to October so that members of the public can enjoy the beauty of Constable country.

== Sudbury to the Sea ==
Every year the Trust organises the Sudbury to the Sea event. Canoes, kayaks and small boats take part in the two-day event, which covers the non-tidal length of the river. The event starts at the Trust Headquarters (The Granary) in Sudbury, with lunch at Bures and an overnight camp at Wissington. The second day takes the participants through Stratford St Mary where the Trust is restoring the lock, and on through the heart of Constable Country via Dedham and Flatford before ending at Cattawade. The event attracts between 200 and 300 boats. While the Trusts event celebrates this scenic navigation with a 'party' vibe, those seeking a more tranquil experience are able to paddle the navigation at any time of the year using their own boats (subject to possession of an EA License) or with any of the hire operators working along the river including; Outdoor Hire Centre Network who offer self-guided trips and River Stour Boating CIC who offer guided trips.

== Stratford Lock ==
The lock at Stratford St Mary was restored over a period of more than 10 years and completed in 2018. It is accessible from the village of Stratford St Mary by a footpath which starts near the wier.
