= River Stour =

River Stour may refer to:

- River Stour, Dorset, a river in the English county of Dorset
- River Stour, Kent, a river in the English county of Kent, and its upper reaches and tributaries:
  - River East Stour
  - River Great Stour
  - River Little Stour
- River Stour, Suffolk, a river in the English counties of Suffolk and Essex
- River Stour, Warwickshire, a river in the English county of Warwickshire
- River Stour, Worcestershire, a river in the English county of Worcestershire
- Stour Brook, in Suffolk and Essex, England
- Stour River, in New Zealand

== See also ==
- Stour (disambiguation)
