= Stour Valley =

Stour Valley may refer to

- The valley of one of the various Stour rivers
- Stour Valley Line
- Stour Valley Railway
- Stour Valley Walk
- Stour Valley Path
- Stour Valley Way
- Stour Valley Community School
