= Stour Estuary RSPB reserve =

RSPB nature reserve in Essex, England

Coordinates: 51.9353°N 1.186°E

The Stour Estuary is a nature reserve in Essex, England, east of Colchester on the estuary of the River Stour, managed by the Royal Society for the Protection of Birds (RSPB).

The reserve is unusual in that it consists of two divergent habitat types: intertidal mudflats (fringed by saltmarsh and estuarine reeds), and 130 acres (0.5 km^{2}) of deciduous woodland, mainly oak and coppiced sweet chestnut.

The estuary is important as a breeding, roosting and wintering site for many waterfowl and other birds, including woodpeckers, nightingale, blackcap, common whitethroat, sedge warbler, reed warbler, European wigeon, common shelduck, northern pintail, common teal, dark-bellied brant goose, grey plover, common redshank, Eurasian curlew, dunlin and black-tailed godwit.

Mammals to be seen include red fox (Vulpes vulpes), badger (Meles meles), grey squirrel (Sciurus carolinensis) and hazel dormouse (Muscardinus avellanarius).

Butterflies and rare moths include white admiral (Limenitis camilla), chocolate-tip moth (Clostera curtula) and peach blossom moth (Thyatira batis).

In the Spring, the woodland floor is covered with wood anemones creating a spectacular display.

The Stour Estuary is the focus of Arthur Ransome's 1939 children's novel, Secret Water.
