= East Stour =

East Stour may refer to:

- East Stour, Dorset, a village in the English county of Dorset
- East Stour, Kent, a river in the English county of Kent
