= Stour Brook =

Location
- Country: England
- Region: Suffolk, Essex

Physical characteristics
- Source
  - location: Haverhill, Suffolk
  - coordinates: 52.1187°N 0.3750°E
  - elevation: 120 m (390 ft)
- Mouth: River Stour
  - location: between Sturmer and Wixoe
  - coordinates: 52.0667°N 0.4898°E
  - elevation: 54 m (177 ft)
- Length: 11.1 km (6.9 mi)

Basin features
- River system: River Stour

Stour Brook is a river that starts north west of the town of Haverhill, Suffolk just over the Cambridgeshire border. After leaving Haverhill, it quickly joins the River Stour by the village of Wixoe, Essex. During its course through Haverhill, most of the natural channel of this river has been replaced with a concrete channel.

== Course ==
The brook rises in the hills just east of West Wickham in Cambridgeshire, only half a mile to the south of the source of the River Stour. It flows east for around 2/3 mile (1.1 km) before crossing into Suffolk and turning south east. It passes alongside the parish church of St Mary at Withersfield, before continuing to Haverhill, where it follows the course of the former railway track through the town centre, though a portion of it has been culverted. It then passes the old railway station at Sturmer and flows into the River Stour only 50 yards or so after it has begun to mark the border between Essex and Suffolk.

== See also ==
- Rivers of the United Kingdom
