= Wixoe =

Village in Suffolk, England

Coordinates: 52.059°N 0.504°E

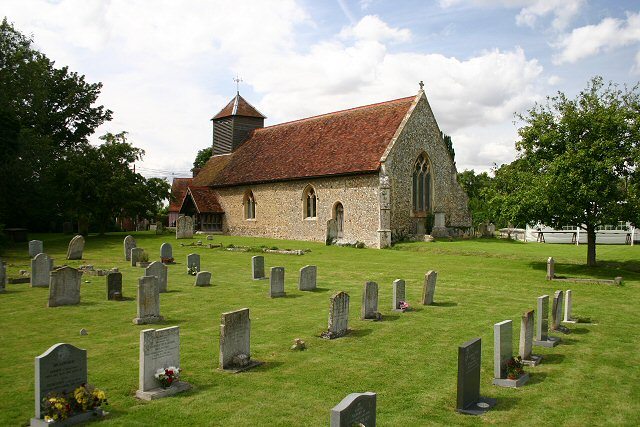
- St Leonard's Church, Wixoe

- Location within Suffolk
- Population: 140 (2005); 145 (2011)
- District: West Suffolk
- Shire county: Suffolk
- Region: East
- Country: England
- Sovereign state: United Kingdom
- Post town: Sudbury
- Postcode district: CO10
- Police: Suffolk
- Fire: Suffolk
- Ambulance: East of England
- UK Parliament: West Suffolk

Wixoe is a village and civil parish in the West Suffolk district of Suffolk in eastern England. Located on the northern bank of the River Stour, two miles south-east of Haverhill, in 2005 its population was 140. It consists largely of Victorian cottages along a narrow lane. There is a church of 12th-century origin, St Leonard's, much restored in the 1880s. It was recorded in the Domesday Book, at 600 acres one of the smallest parishes in the hundred of Risbridge. There are some 13 listed buildings, including a 19th-century bridge and a water mill.

The Great Eastern Railway ran through the village, part of the Stour Valley line from 1865 until its closure in March 1967 under the Beeching 'axe'. The nearest stations were Sturmer to the west and Stoke-by-Clare to the east. The track bed and embankments remain clearly visible.

== The Roman town ==
Roman remains have been frequently located in the vicinity, mostly on the Essex side of the Stour and a settlement has long been proposed. In 1803 close to Watsoe Bridge TL 706 430, an earthwork enclosure was identified as a 'camp', along with two cemeteries. In 1973 aerial photography showed many large pits, two streets and a building with flint foundations, close to the river. Fieldwalking and metal detection over many years revealed multiple finds of coins and other artefacts: brooches, figurines, pottery. The location has been identified as one of eight small Roman towns in Suffolk, including Icklingham, Long Melford and Felixstowe, that of Wixoe being estimated to occupy 12 hectares.

In 2011, on the Suffolk side of the Stour, archaeological digs and magnetic survey, as part of the Abberton pipeline installation, have revealed a small town occupied from 100-400 AD, occupying a position of some local strategic significance because of its road connections. The Via Devana from Chester to Colchester, a military track, passed through. Another road led east from Wixoe, on the north side of the Stour, passing through Long Melford, before heading north-east to Baylham and possibly to Dunwich. A third road led north, probably towards Icklingham and the Icknield Way. A fourth, close to the Ains Ford, is surmised towards the major Roman fort at Great Chesterford, on a more southerly section of the Icknield Way. No clear trace of these roads immediately outside Wixoe can now be seen: the agger in the form of valley side terraces has either been eroded by ploughing or incorporated into field boundaries, as is typical across East Anglia. It is possible that the Stour was navigable as far as Wixoe by flat-bottomed boats; a wharf area may be surmised.

Other features and artefacts date from the 1st century, increasing in the 3rd century and declining in the early 4th century (when Rome withdrew from Britain): a range of domestic buildings and courtyards, boundary ditches, industrial ovens and hearths with evidence of copper, lead and iron workings, cobbled surfaces, pits for quarrying and storage, burials, streets. The estimated size has now been raised to 24 hectares. The town seems to be a rural commercial centre, with industrial production relying on local timber (charcoal) and imported metals. It fits into the pattern of small towns with a hinterland of 8–10 km in radius, representing a day's journey; five other Roman towns lie within 15–25 km. Its size and commercial activity increased in the 3rd century as did many other towns; remains of a defensive ditch may also belong to that period. As with other East Anglian sites, in the absence of building stone, it was timber built. It was a 'planned' settlement in the sense that, though there are limited prehistoric finds, it did not supplant an earlier settlement. Judging by the amount of material, particularly pottery and coins, it was probably built after the Boudiccan revolt and the sacking of Camulodunum (Colchester). This is the biggest Roman find in Suffolk for 25 years. The final report of this excavation is expected in 2013.
