= River Stour, eastern England =

River in England

River Stour
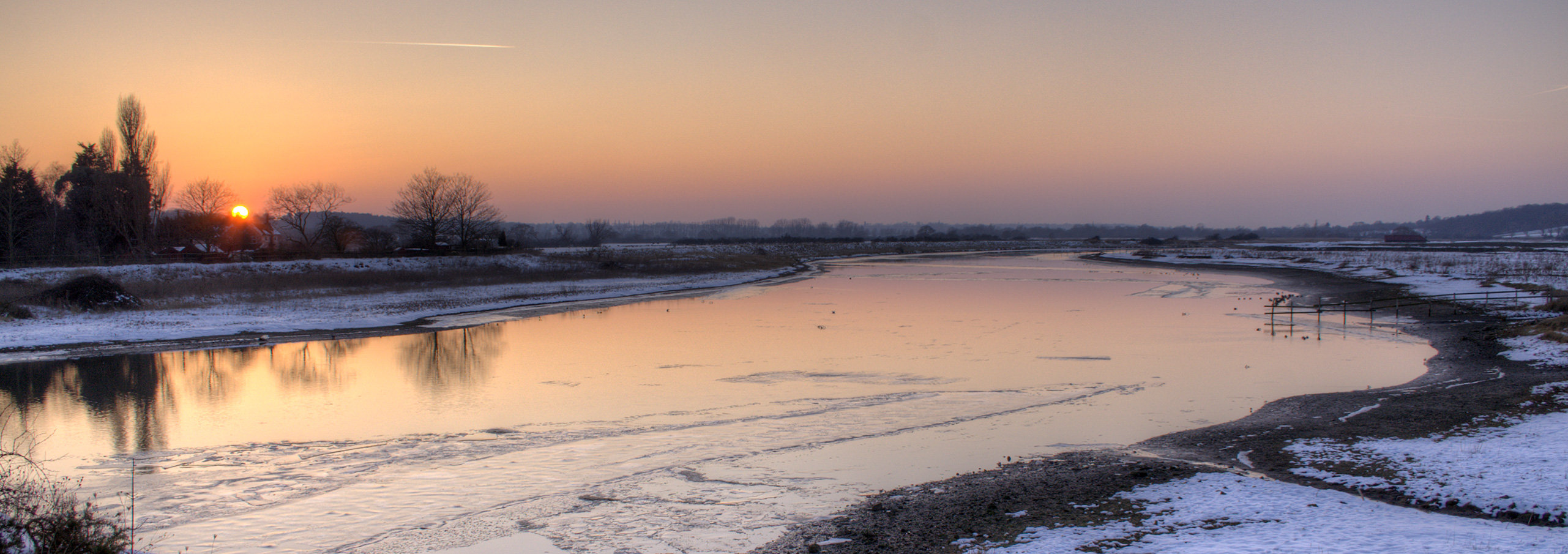
- The Stour at Manningtree, Essex

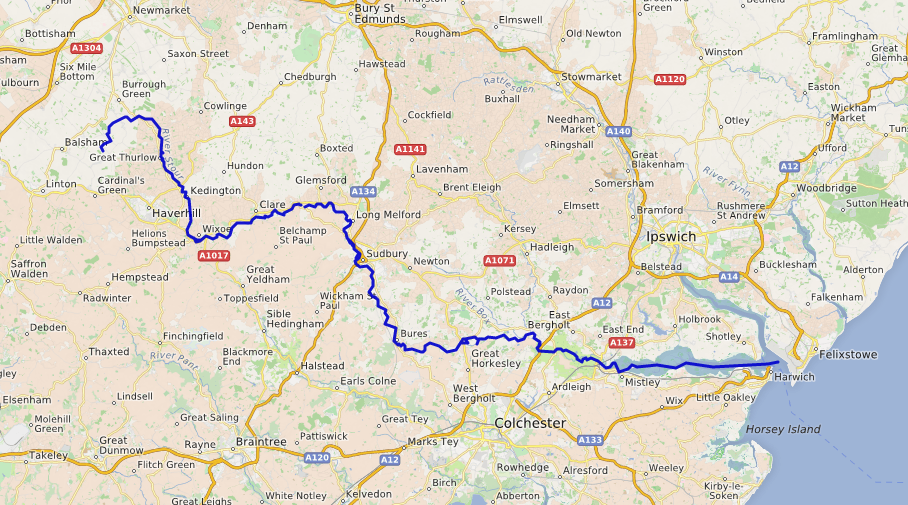
- Course of the Stour river.

Location
- Country: England
- Counties: Cambridgeshire, Suffolk, Essex
- Major towns/cities: Haverhill, Sudbury, Harwich

Physical characteristics
- Source
  - location: West Wickham, Cambridgeshire, England
  - coordinates: 52.1261°N 0.3783°E
  - elevation: 117 m (384 ft)
- Mouth: North Sea
  - location: Harwich, Essex, UK
  - coordinates: 51.9494°N 1.2196°E
  - elevation: 0 m (0 ft)
- Length: 47 mi (76 km)

Basin features
- Tributaries
  - left: Chilton Stream, River Glem, River Box, River Brett
  - right: Stour Brook, Bumpstead Brook, Belchamp Brook, Cambridge Brook

The River Stour (/ˈstʊər, ˈstaʊər/ (rhyming with either "tower" or "sour") is a major river in eastern England. It is 47 miles (76 km) long and forms most of the county boundary between Suffolk to the north, and Essex to the south. It rises in eastern Cambridgeshire, passes to the east of Haverhill, through Cavendish, Sudbury, Bures, Nayland, Stratford St Mary and Dedham. It becomes tidal just before Manningtree in Essex and joins the North Sea at Harwich.

The entire non-tidal river above Manningtree is designated as the Dedham Vale National Landscape, formerly known as an Area of Outstanding Natural Beauty. It has been painted by a number of prominent artists, including John Constable and Thomas Gainsborough.

The river was improved for navigation following the passing of an act of Parliament, the River Stower Navigation Act 1705 (4 & 5 Ann. c. 2) (Note: This is the citation in The Statutes of the Realm.). Locks were built to enable lighters to reach the town of Sudbury. Most of the locks were associated with mills, and the original 13 flash locks and 13 pound locks were replaced by 15 pound locks in the 19th century. The river was reasonably profitable at the beginning of the 19th century, but the advent of the railways led to a steady decline from 1852 onwards. Attempts to abandon it were thwarted by legal difficulties, but in 1914 the River Stour Navigation Company declared itself bankrupt, and the river soon became moribund.

From 1928 onwards, the river became a major source of drinking water, with South East Essex Waterworks (now Essex and Suffolk Water) extracting water at Langham and then Stratford St Mary pumping stations. As the demand for water grew, the Ely-Ouse to Essex Transfer Scheme was implemented, with water from the River Great Ouse discharged into the upper reaches of the river, and extracted again by the pumping stations. A third extraction point was added near Brantham, so that volumes of water flowing through Flatford could be maintained at a higher level for the benefit of tourists. To prevent salt water entering the river valley, sluices and a barrage were built at Cattawade, preventing boats from entering the river from the estuary.

The River Stour Trust was set up in 1968 to campaign for greater use of the river for navigation. It has worked to refurbish four locks, and to run boat trips from Flatford and Sudbury. The river can be used by unpowered craft between Sudbury and Cattawade, but powered boats are normally only allowed between Sudbury and Henny Mill, although the Trust has permission to run an electric boat at Flatford. Canoes and kayaks have to be portaged around the former locks where these have been replaced by fixed weirs and sluices.

== Etymology and usage ==
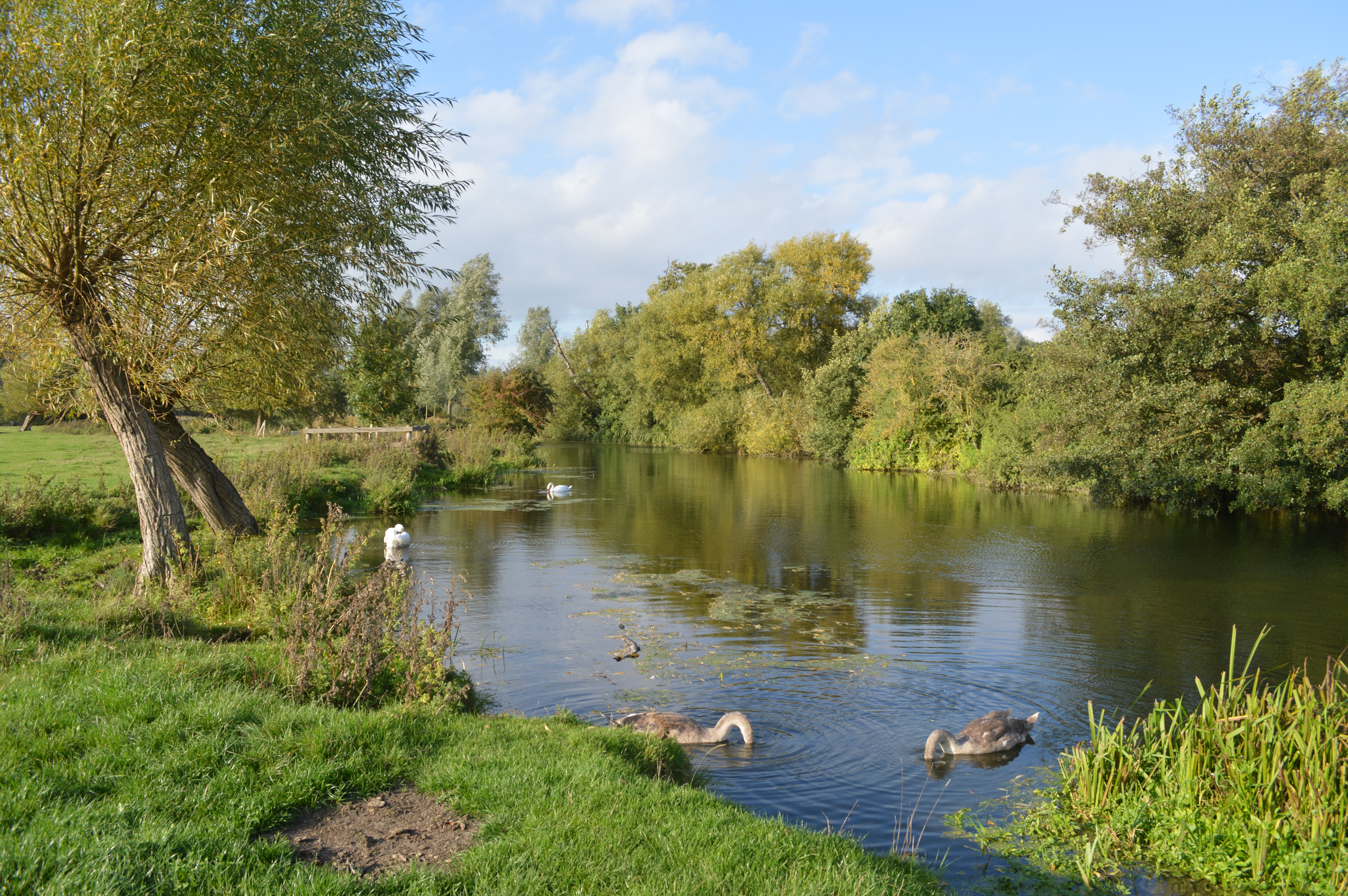
River Stour about 1 km east of Dedham

The name is of uncertain and disputed origin. The river does not have a uniform pronunciation, varying from stowr to stoor.

On one theory, the name Stour derives from the Celtic sturr meaning "strong". However, the river-name Stour, common in England, does not occur at all in Wales; Crawford noted two tributaries of the Po River near Turin, spelled Stura. In Germany the Stoer is a tributary of the River Elbe. According to Brewer's Britain and Ireland the Stour is pronounced differently in different cases: the Kentish and East Anglian Stours rhyme with tour; the Oxfordshire Stour is sometimes rhymed with mower, sometimes with hour, and the Worcestershire Stour always rhymes with hour.

As against that, stour is a Middle English word with two distinct meanings and derivations, still current enough to appear in most substantial dictionaries. As an adjective, with Germanic roots, it signifies "large, powerful" (in present-day Scandinavian languages stor means "big, great"). As a noun, from medieval French roots, it signifies "tumult, commotion; confusion" or an "armed battle or conflict". Wiktionary also adds "blowing or deposit of dust", the primary definition in the Concise Oxford Dictionary, which adds that this is a northern English and Scottish usage of uncertain derivation. In 2006 it has been suggested that an Old European river-name was taken for an Old English adjective and that stour came to represent one pole of a structural opposition, with blyth at the opposite pole, allowing Anglo-Saxons to classify rivers on a continuum of fierceness.

The Victorian etymologist Isaac Taylor proposed a very simple solution: that Stour derives from dŵr, the Welsh word for water.

It is quite possible that the various Stours do not share a common origin and that they need to be considered in their own terms rather than as a single problem. Certainly there is currently no universally-accepted explanation.

== Description ==
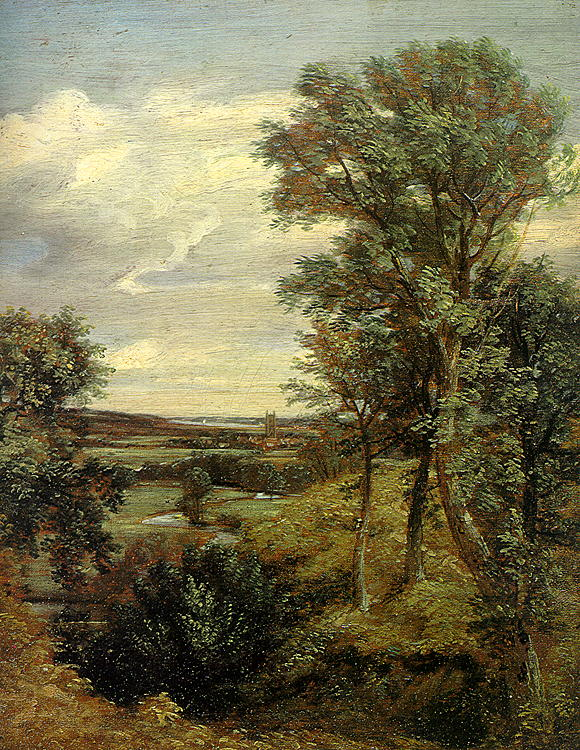
Constable's Dedham Vale was painted in 1802.

The river rises in Wratting Common, Cambridgeshire, to the south of Weston Colville, and passes near Great Bradley where it is joined by Kirtling Brook. It continues through Little Thurlow, Great Thurlow, Great Wratting, and Kedington before passing to the east of Haverhill, where the county boundary between Suffolk and Essex starts to follow its course. The villages of Wixoe, Stoke-by-Clare, Clare and Cavendish are all on the left bank of the river. The River Glem joins it on the left bank, before it passes to the west of Long Melford and then skirts the western and southern edges of Sudbury. It is crossed by the A131 road at Ballingdon Bridge, to the south-west of Sudbury, below which it is officially navigable. It continues through Bures and to the south of Nayland to reach the western edge of Stratford St Mary. Dedham is on the south bank and Flatford on the north bank. To the south of Brantham the river becomes tidal below Cattawade barrage, after which it opens out to become an estuary near Manningtree, and runs along the southern side of the Shotley Peninsula. The international port of Harwich is on the south bank, and it is joined by the River Orwell as it reaches the sea to the east of Harwich.

The river from Cattawade barrage to Orwell Haven is tidal and used by large ships. The channel is dredged to 17 feet (5 m), and this section should only be navigated by those experienced in tidal river navigation. Coasters travel up the river as far as the quay at Mistley.

== History ==
The earliest known settlement on the river in Suffolk was at Great Bradley, where human occupation has been recorded for over 5,000 years. During the Anglo-Saxon era, the river became the boundary between the Kingdom of the East Saxons and the Kingdom of East Anglia. The Life of King Alfred records a naval battle taking place at the mouth of the river, near Harwich in 884 or 885, where Alfred the Great defeated a force of 13 Viking ships.

== Environmental issues ==
=== Landscape ===
The threat of large scale housebuilding in a scenic and relatively sparsely populated area, led to the river valley above Manningtree being designated the Dedham Vale National Landscape (formerly termed an Area of Outstanding Natural Beauty). The designated area is named after the village of Dedham in Essex. It is an area of rural beauty on both sides of the river, covering around 35 square miles (90 km^{2}) in total.

The valley is directly accessible by rail from London and Colchester, but people wishing to travel from Ipswich must change. The valley is generally poorly connected by road to the Suffolk coast. The area was better connected, before the closure of most of the Stour Valley Railway in 1967.

The Stour valley has been portrayed as a working river by artists including John Constable, Thomas Gainsborough, Alfred Munnings, John Nash and Cedric Morris. Constable's connection with the area was especially important, evident in such works as Stour Valley and Dedham Church c. 1815. John Nash, who was an official war artist, settled in the Stour valley and is buried at St Andrew's at Wormingford, one of its typically serene small settlements.

=== Dark skies ===
The low population densities and distance from large cities means much of the Stour valley has relatively little light pollution, an situation which is unusual in the densely populated south-east of England. As a consequence, the hamlet of Thorington Street has been designated an International Darksky Community.

=== Biodiversity ===
RSPB Stour Estuary is a nature reserve managed by the Royal Society for the Protection of Birds (RSPB). It is located on the south bank of the estuary, to the east of Wrabness. Just to the west is Wrabness Nature Reserve, a Site of Special Scientific Interest covering 69 acres (28 ha). It is run by the Essex Wildlife Trust and is also a designated Local Nature Reserve and a Local Wildlife Site.

=== Environmental harms ===
In July 2019 sections of the river ran dry because of low rainfall and debris blocking flows at Bures Mill. The Environment Agency pumped water from boreholes into the river in an attempt to restore water levels.

== Navigation ==
There are no known records detailing use of the river by boats prior to the 17th century, but in 1634, Daniel Biatt, the mayor of Sudbury, met with Mr Doctor Warren and Mr Spencer to plan how to make the river navigable. On 11 December 1638 Spencer obtained letters patent authorising him to make the river navigable from Manningtree to Sudbury. No progress was made, due to unrest around the time of the civil war, Spencer's pre-occupation with a similar project on the River Ouse, and his own financial difficulties. A similar scheme was proposed by Mr Maynard in 1658, but again no progress was made. By the late 1600s, John Little and Benjamin Dodd had obtained the rights of the Letters Patent, and later claimed they had spent a lot of money improving the river.

River Stower Navigation Act 1705
- Act of Parliament
- Parliament of England
- Long title: An Act for making the River Stower navigable, from the Town of Maningtree, in the County of Essex, to the Town of Sudbury, in the County of Suffolk.
- Citation: 4 & 5 Ann. c. 2; 4 Ann. c. 15 (Note: This is the citation in The Statutes at Large.)
- Territorial extent: England and Wales

Dates
- Royal assent: 16 February 1706
- Commencement: 25 October 1705 (Note: Start of session.)
Other legislation
Relates to	River Stower Navigation Act 1781

Status: Current legislation

Text of statute as originally enacted

What they did is unknown, for in 1703 the mayor and corporation of Sudbury presented a bill to Parliament to make the river navigable. Little and Dodd objected, as they already had rights under the letters patent, but their case was dismissed, and an act of Parliament, the River Stower Navigation Act 1705 (4 & 5 Ann. c. 2), was granted to Sudbury on 16 February 1706. It was entitled An Act for making the River Stower navigable from the town of Manningtree, in the county of Essex, to the town of Sudbury, in the county of Suffolk. A long list of commissioners was established, and the work was to be carried out by the mayor and aldermen of Sudbury and ten others. It had to be started before 24 June 1708 and completed by 24 June 1713. In order to placate the millers, they were given rights to carry millstones and building materials for their mills without payment of tolls. A towpath would be provided on parts of the river, but the path was intermittent.

The act also allowed winches and other engines to be set up on the banks, so that boats could be hauled through the flash locks which were built. A total of 13 flash locks and 13 pound locks were constructed. The posts on which the lock gates hung were continued above the top of the lock, and a lintel spanned the lock to prevent the posts collapsing inwards. Timber sides to the locks later replaced the earth walls, and in the 19th century the flash locks were removed, while the pound locks were rebuilt, so that there were 15 between Sudbury and the estuary.

Unusually for a navigation, the act did not specify how money to fund the project should be raised. In practice, 48 shares with a value of £100 were issued. Cornelius Denn bought 24, while the other 24 were split between Dean Cock and some clothiers from Sudbury. Denn and Cock were both merchants from London. This provided insufficient capital to complete the work, and the subscribers were asked for more money. £9,000 was raised, of which £6,500 was spent on the navigation works, £800 on 16 barges, and £1,700 on warehousing and other amenities. It is not known if there was an official opening, but in May 1709 barges carried 2,211 tons of coal from Manningtree up the navigation to Sudbury. The company was continually short of money, and in 1722 Daniel Defoe noted that the navigation was not really adequate. The company ceased in 1736 to be solely responsible for barge traffic on the river, and allowed anyone to use it on payment of a toll.

River Stower Navigation Act 1781
- Act of Parliament
- Parliament of Great Britain
- Long title: An Act for appointing new Commissioners for continuing to carry into Execution the Trusts and Powers of an Act passed in the Fourth and Fifth Years of the Reign of Her late Majesty Queen Anne, intituled, "An Act for making the River Stower navigable, from the Town of Maningtree, in the County of Essex, to the Town of Sudbury, in the County of Suffolk," in the Room and Place of those named in the said Act, who are since dead; and for explaining and amending the said Act; and for other Purposes therein mentioned.
- Citation: 21 Geo. 3. c. 75
- Territorial extent: Great Britain

Dates
- Royal assent: 19 June 1781
- Commencement: 31 October 1780 (Note: Start of session.)
Other legislation
Amended by	SR&O 1919/428
Relates to	River Stower Navigation Act 1705

Status: Amended

Text of statute as originally enacted

The commissioners failed to elect new members as older ones died, and by the 1770s there were only two left. Since a quorum of 15 was required to appoint new commissioners, a second act of Parliament, the River Stower Navigation Act 1781 (21 Geo. 3. c. 75) was obtained. New commissioners included Golding Constable, the father of the painter John Constable, and two brothers of the painter Thomas Gainsborough, Samuel and John. The act also empowered the new commissioners to build a towpath along the entire navigable section, and to maintain bridges, stiles and gates. Golding Constable and William Strutt had surveyed the river by September 1782, and a programme of dredging was carried out. Income from tolls was £700 in 1782, but this had doubled by 1817, with a large proportion of the revenue derived from the carriage of coal.

=== Operation ===
As trade improved, so did the river's profitability, with a dividend of 11 percent paid in 1817. There were proposals to build links to Hadleigh, Boxford and Lavenham, but the only work carried out was a short cut near Sudbury to serve brickworks and limekilns, which was known as the Ballingdon Cut. Despite advice from William Cubitt that railways would never offer serious competition in the carriage of heavy goods, the proprietors spent £12,000 on a modernisation programme, involving the construction of towing paths and a cut to bypass a long loop at Wormingford, which included two new locks. Tolls for using the river were restructured, and there was a proposal in 1842 to upgrade the river for a further 8 miles (13 km) to Clare, but the scheme was not pursued due to the cost and the number of locks required.

The Eastern Counties Railway missed Sudbury by 11 miles (18 km) when it opened in 1843, but the Colchester, Stour Valley, Sudbury & Halstead Railway was them promoted. The promoters tried to buy out the navigation, but rejected the asking price of £1,000 per share. Income on the navigation peaked at £3,400 in 1848, but had dropped to £1,400 by 1852, when the railway was operating. The towing path was far from satisfactory, with horses having to jump over fences, of which there were 123 in 1850, and 20 locations where the horse was transferred to the opposite bank by jumping onto the moving barge and jumping off again at the other side. In 1862 the proprietors investigated steam barges, and ordered one which arrived in 1863. It was not a success, and despite various modifications, was out of use by 1867.

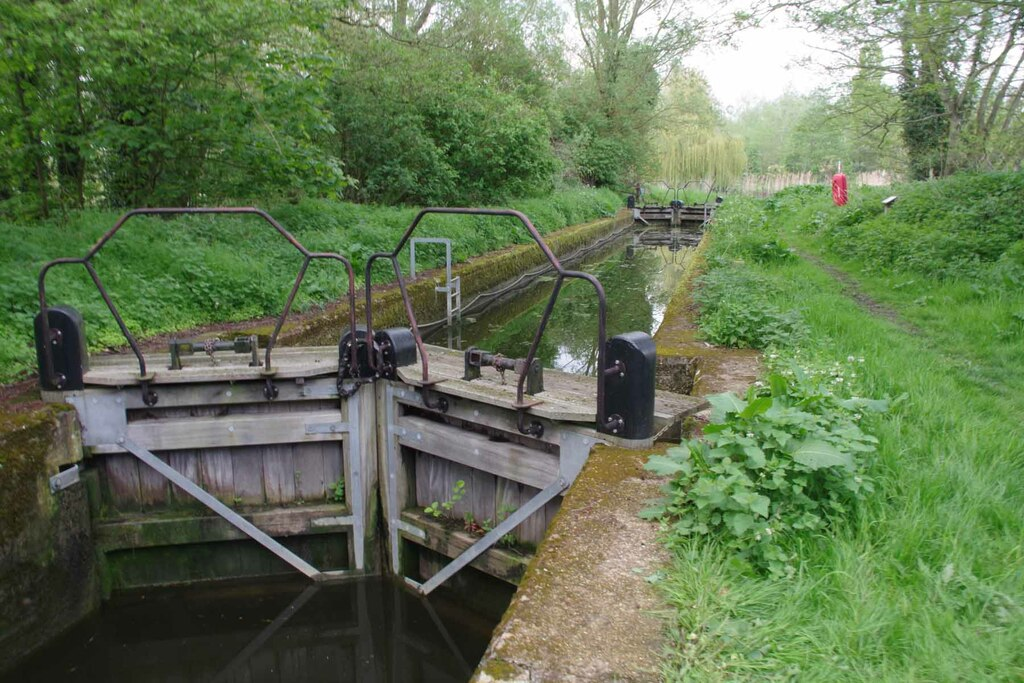
Stratford St Mary's lock was restored in 2017

There was a steady decline in traffic between 1864 and 1873, with many commodities dropping by 50 percent. Dividends were reduced from ten percent to two percent over the same period, and maintenance was less frequent, although a self-acting dredging crane was obtained in 1879, and worked successfully. Trade in bricks from the brickworks at Ballingdon Cut and in flour held up for some time, despite railway competition, but in 1892 the proprietors applied for an abandonment order. This was refused, as the river had not been disused for the required three years. Instead they formed a limited company, the River Stour Navigation Company Ltd. By 1906, tolls were no longer adequate to pay for maintenance, and on 8 October 1914, the company declared itself bankrupt.

The shareholders then formed a Trust, and although the last barge to reach Sudbury did so in 1916, there was limited traffic on the lower reaches of the river. The South Essex Waterworks Company rebuilt the locks at Brantham, Flatford, Stratford and Dedham in 1928 at a cost of £20,000, replacing the wooden sides with concrete walls. There was some traffic by millers until about 1930, but the Trust was finally dissolved on 19 March 1937.

=== Restoration ===
There was growing enthusiasm for canal restoration projects in the 1950s, and a group of canoeists from the Chelmsford Boat Club paddled down the lower reaches of the river on 17 October 1954, as part of a campaign to revive interest in the navigation. With the creation of the British Waterways Board pending, the River Stour Action Committee published A Guide to the Suffolk River Stour, which highlighted the legal problems preventing the river from being reopened. A second cruise by canoeists from Chelmsford Boat Club was held in September 1962, covering the stretch from Langham to Brantham. The London Volunteer Working Group of the Inland Waterways Association began publishing Navies Notebook in October 1966, and the first edition carried details of a working party at Brantham Lock, to begin restoration.

The River Stour Action Committee formed a trust in 1967, backed by the Essex Rural Community Council, to focus on restoration of the locks and the navigation. This became the River Stour Trust in 1968. In 1981, an arm of the Sudbury basin was cleared by the United States Air Force's 819th Civil Engineering Squadron as part of a training exercise. The trust opened a fund to finance the construction of a new lock at Great Cornard, but a public inquiry to review new bylaws for the navigation proposed that the use of powered boats on the river should be prohibited. The Trust bought Flatford Lock in 1990, and its restoration was aided by a grant of £90,000 from Rio Tinto Zinc. The Trust also paid for the National Rivers Authority to refurbish the gates at Dedham Lock, to make them watertight, and the repairs lasted until they were declared to be unsafe in 2014. At the end of 1995, the Trust received a grant of £167,890 from the Millennium Commission to help with the construction of Great Cornard lock. Additional funds came from the Trust's own fund and from local councils.

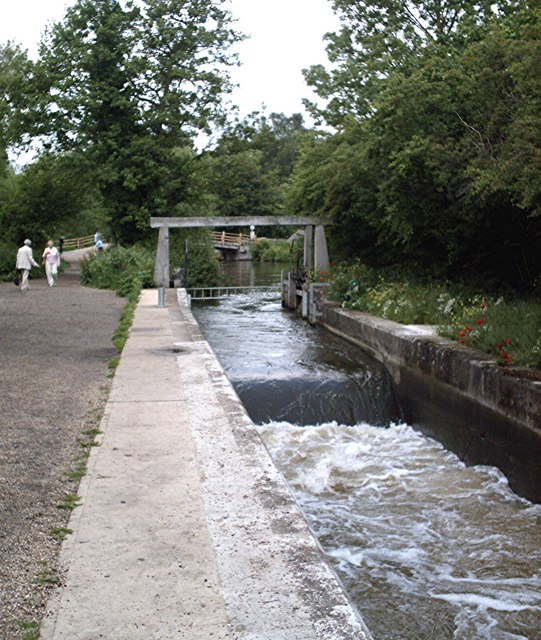
Flatford Lock, with the tilting weir being used to manage flood levels in the river

The Environment Agency is the navigation authority for the river. They took over the role from the National Rivers Authority in 1995. Powered boats are only allowed to use the section of the river near Sudbury from Ballingdon Bridge to Henny Mill, and a speed limit of 4 mph (6.4 km/h) is enforced. The rest of the once-navigable river from Brundon Mill to Cattawade can be used by canoes, kayaks and other non-powered craft, but have to be portaged around various fixed structures, often located where the locks once were. However, the Environment Agency are considering allowing the use of electric-powered boats on the lower river, and the River Stour Trust has permission to use electric trip boats on this section. The locks at Great Cornard, Stratford St Mary, Dedham and Flatford must be operated by Environment Agency staff, and advance notice of intent to navigate through them must be given. The locks rebuilt in 1928 were 95 feet (29 m) long, and 10 feet (3.0 m) wide, with a draught of 2.75 feet (0.84 m). Dedham and Flatford locks have tilting weir structures fitted within them, and navigating them is not possible when the weirs are being used as part of the flood defences of the river.

The River Stour Trust, a waterway restoration group, was set up in 1968 to protect and enhance the right of the public to navigate the River Stour. The trust seeks to restore through navigation from Sudbury to the sea, following on the successful restoration of the locks at Stratford St Mary, Dedham, Flatford and Great Cornard, by reinstating the remaining locks. Meanwhile, the Trust encourages use of the river by small craft and organises annual events for all age groups and abilities on different parts of it. Boat trips and private charters, skippered by volunteer crews from the Trust, are available in Flatford and Sudbury between Easter and October.

The Stour Valley Adventure Centre hires out canoes, kayaks and paddle boards from a centre in Sudbury. The craft can be borrowed by the hour, and they also offer a two-day paddle from Sudbury to Cattawade, with transport to and from the start and end points to a campsite in Nayland, which forms the mid-point of the journey.

== Flood defences ==
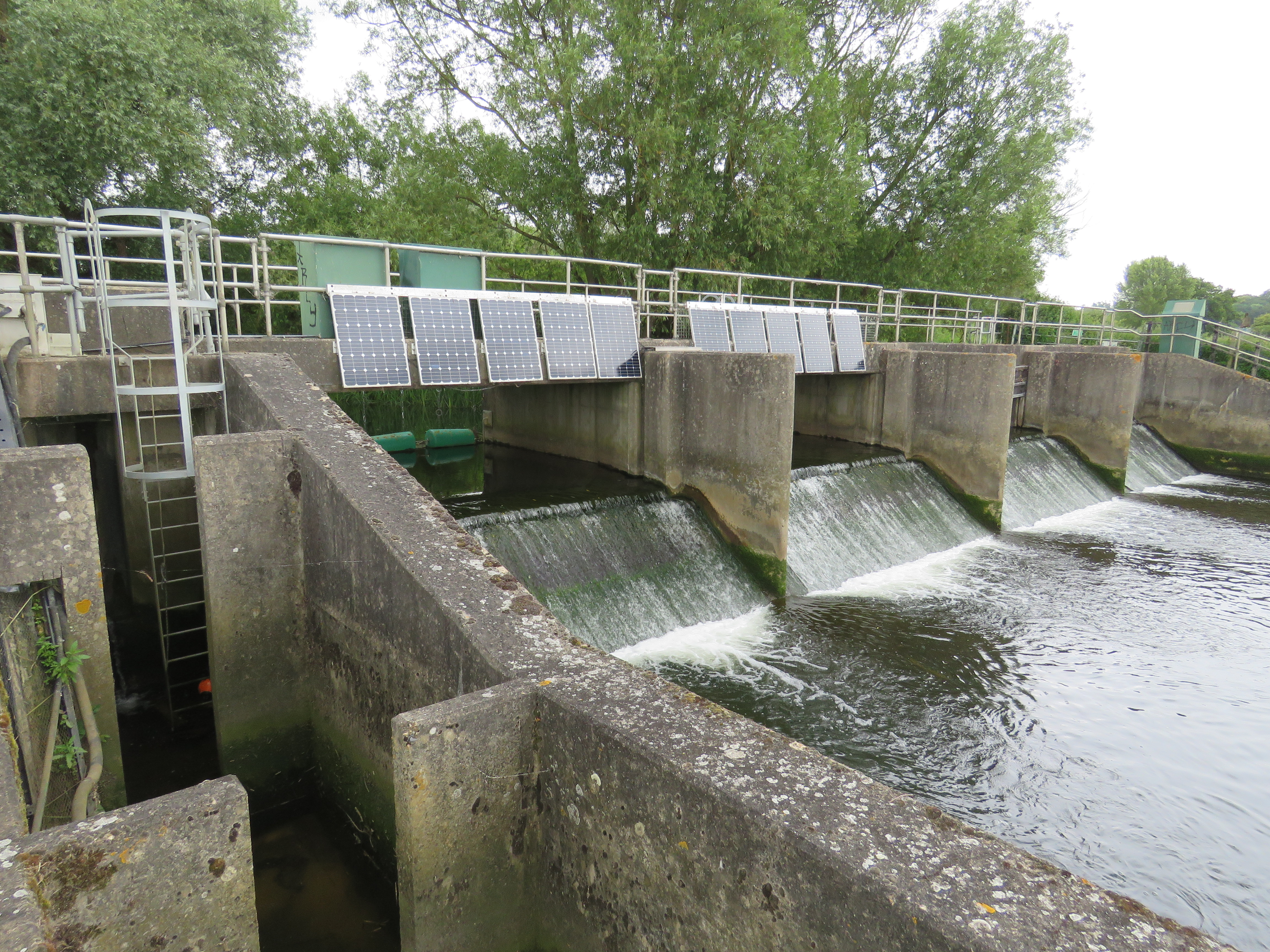
Judas Gap weir was rebuilt by South Essex Waterworks Co in 1948, as a condition for increasing the amount of drinking water extracted from the river.

After the Navigation Trust declared itself bankrupt, the state of the river steadily declined, as locks decayed and fallen trees were not removed from the river. The lack of maintenance resulted in flooding of agricultural land, and so the Ministry of Agriculture created a Drainage Board responsible for flood control of the area in 1918. Three years later, they requested the Navigation Trust to remove the locks at Horkesley and Boxted, and to permanently open the paddles on the locks at Langham and Stratford St Mary, to aid the passage of water down the river. Numerous meetings took place over the following two decades, but little was achieved, and the river continued to deteriorate. Meadows near Flatford were regularly flooded by water passing up the south channel, and while tides passing up the north channel normally only reached Judas Gap, high spring tides could sometimes reach Flatford. The South Essex Waterworks Company wanted to extract more water from the river immediately following the Second World War, and this was granted on condition that they improved flood defences where the river reached the estuary. This work involved improving the weir at Judas Gap, and constructing a barrage across the south channel. It had 56 gravity-controlled gates, which could be used to allow fresh water to leave the river, but prevent salt water from entering it, and was known as the 56 Gate. Following its completion in 1948, land upstream of the 56 Gate was reclaimed for agricultural use.

In the aftermath of the North Sea flood of 1953, much thought was given as to how to protect coastal communities from such events, and in 1969 a new flood defence scheme was implemented. A dam with a sluice through it was built across the north channel below Cattawade Bridge at Brantham, while sluice gates were fitted across the south channel. The project also included building Cattawade Bypass, which travels over the flood defence dam at Brantham. These changes meant that there was fresh water habitat all the way down to the defences. A new weir containing a fish pass replaced the structure at Judas Gap, and this has resulted in the mill pond at Flatford always being fairly full, even in dry summers. The 56 Gate was no longer needed and the work, which was paid for jointly by Suffolk County Council and the Essex Water Company, was completed in 1971.

== Milling ==
The river and its tributaries have been an important source of power to the communities that live near them since at least the time of the Domesday Book of 1086. Some 45 water mills are known to have existed along their banks. Many of the sites are identifiable from modern maps. In some cases, either the mill or the associated mill house is named, while in others, multiple channels and an obvious mill pond show their location. Below Sudbury, most of the locks were associated with a mill. None of the mills are still operational, but where the buildings still exist, most are now listed buildings. Because the river forms the boundary between Suffolk and Essex for most of its length, those on the left bank are generally in Suffolk, and those on the right bank are in Essex. The furthest upstream is Kedington, where a mill was known to exist in 1066, but had been demolished by 1086. The present building dates from the 18th century, and was a corn mill until 1901. It is Grade II listed, as is the adjacent 17th-century mill house. Wixoe Mill is also an 18th-century building, constructed with a timber frame with weatherboarding on a brick base. The mill house and stables are nearby.

Baythorne Mill in Birdbrook dates from the 18th century, but was extended in the 19th century, when a building to house a steam engine and a tall chimney were added. It retains its mill wheel, although it is not operational, and some rare early leaded glass windows. At Clare, the 19th-century mill house survives but the mill building was destroyed by fire in 1978. At Pentlow, a long range dating from the 18th century contains both the mill and the mill house. The timber frame is clad with red bricks, and both parts are now residential. At Lyston Mill, the weather-boarded timber-framed mill house remains, although the mill itself was demolished in 1887 after a period of disuse. Borley Mill is a large timber-framed structure with three storeys, with a gabled lucombe projecting from the roof. It was a corn mill until 1916, and was then used to produce animal feed until it closed in 1969. In the 1940s there was probably a steam engine at the site, but the tall chimney has since been demolished. On the outskirts of Sudbury, the building at Brundon Mill dates from the 18th century. Water power was supplemented by a steam engine from 1857 until cereal milling ceased in 1923. It was converted into a house in 1932. Sudbury Mill is a four-storey structure, parts of which date from the 17th and 18th centuries, but most of it date from 1890. The water wheel, installed in 1889, still turns, although it does not drive machinery. A steam-powered roller mill was added in the early 20th century, and it was producing animal feed when it closed in 1964. The building is now the Mill Hotel.

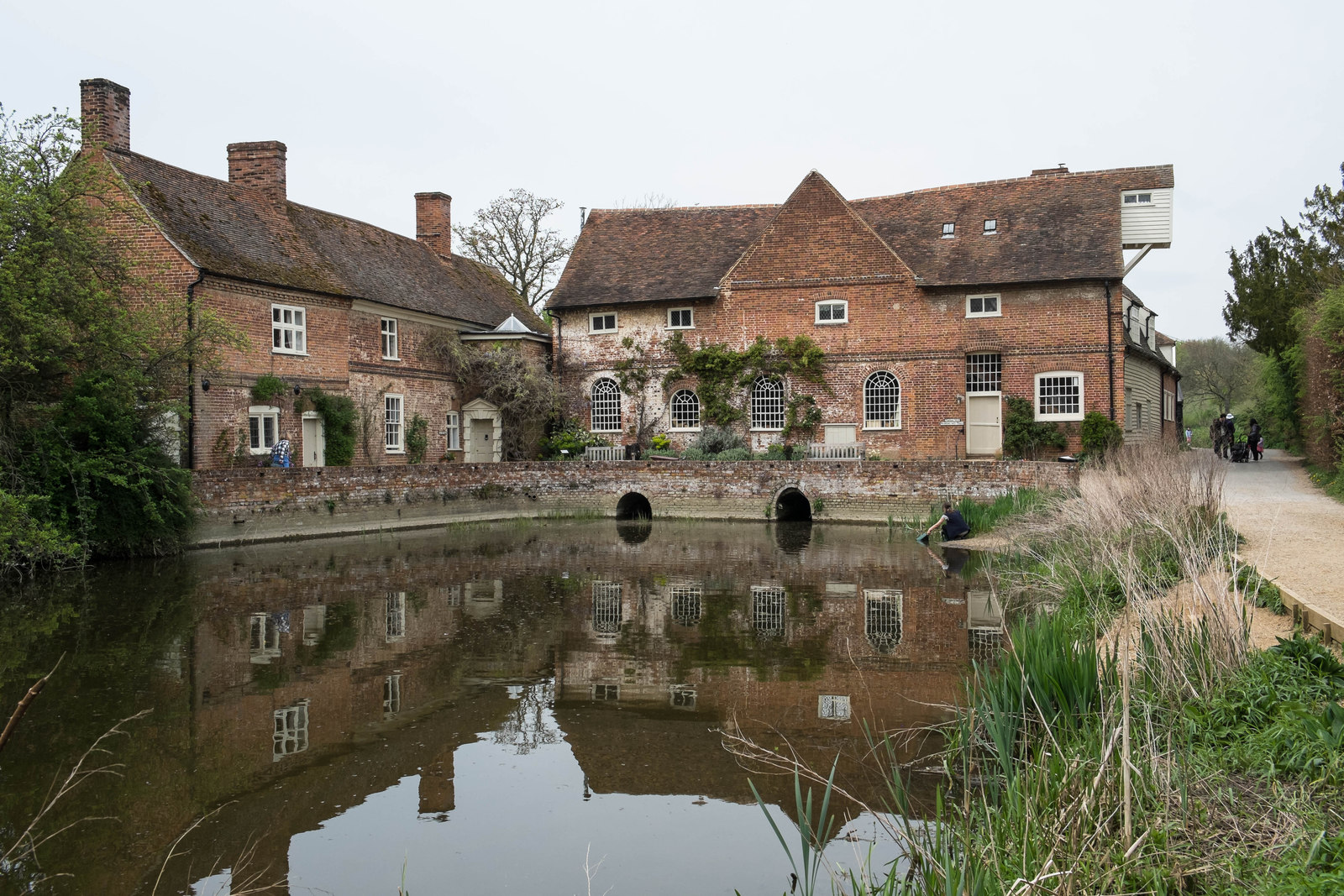
Flatford Mill is a Grade I listed building, used as a field study centre.

Great Cornard was the first site where a lock was needed to navigate around the mill. The mill house dates from the 18th century, with later additions. The family of Edward Baker ran the mill from 1851 to 1967, after which it produced animal feed. The site has since been redeveloped for housing. Great Henny is another site where only the mill house survives. It is an early 19th-century timber-framed building with a hipped slate roof. The mill ceased production before the Second World War, and was subsequently damaged by bombing, leading to it being demolished when the war ended. Bures Mill is a timber-framed building, parts of which are weatherboarded, but much of it is now covered in corrugated asbestos panels. Wiston or Wissington Mill is Grade II* listed. It dates from the 18th and 19th centuries, and internally still contains the milling machinery, while externally parts of the water wheel remain. Part of the mill has been converted into a house, including a wing dating from the 16th century.

Boxted Mill house is a two-storey building with attics, but the mill building was demolished in the 1920s. At Langham, there was a corn mill and a fulling mill in 1086, but the fulling mill was demolished around 1510. In 1752, it was recorded that the remaining mill could fulfil either function. The building was reconstructed in brick around 1779, and ceased operating in 1912. It was later demolished to make way for a pumping station. Flatford Mill is well known because of the paintings of John Constable. It carries a date stone showing 1733, but may include some earlier material. The structure includes a granary to the rear, and a 19th-century wing adjoining the granary. Much of it is constructed of red brick, with some weatherboarding. It was owned and operated by the Constable family from the mid-18th century until 1901, when milling ceased, due to competition from more efficient mills. After a period of decay it was restored and given to the National Trust, and is now leased to the Field Studies Council, who operate a field studies centre there. It is Grade I listed, because of its association with Constable. In 2012, an Archimedes screw turbine was installed at the mill. Rated at 11 kW, it was expected to provide around a third of the energy used by the field studies centre. Work has since been carried out to improve the efficiency of the turbine, and to install a fish pass. The lowest mill on the river was Brantham or Green's Mill, which was recorded in 1086. It may have been a tide mill at that time, and was definitely so later on. It was rebuilt in 1778, and subsequently became a steam-powered roller mill, producing cereals. It ceased to operate in the 1930s, although it was used as a pepper mill during the Second World War, but was damaged during the conflict. The remains were destroyed by fire in 1965.

== Water supply ==
The river plays an important role in the supply of drinking water to residents of Essex. Langham Mill had ceased to operate by 1924, and in 1928 South Essex Waterworks (now Essex and Suffolk Water) obtained an act of Parliament, the South Essex Waterworks Act 1928 (18 & 19 Geo. 5. c. lxxix) granting them permission to demolish it, in order to construct a pumping station on the site. It was licensed to abstract 12 million imperial gallons (55 Ml) per day, which was treated at a works to the west, and then pumped to a reservoir at Danbury, from where it flowed to another reservoir at Herongate, supplying customers in Romford, Ilford and Barking, Essex, in what is now part of Greater London. Reconstruction of the locks at Stratford, Dedham, Flatford and Brantham was a condition of the planning consent for the works. Although not a listed building, the pumping station was added to the Local List in 2020. It is constructed of concrete with a pitched roof, in the International Modernist style popular at the time, and is painted white. At the treatment works, the control room, primary filter house and chemical house are all built in the same Modernist style, and were listed because they form a good example of the style in largely unaltered form. There is a detached house and six semi-detached houses built in a similar style to the south of the works, probably designed as housing for the staff, and a service reservoir to the east with its own Modernist pumping station.

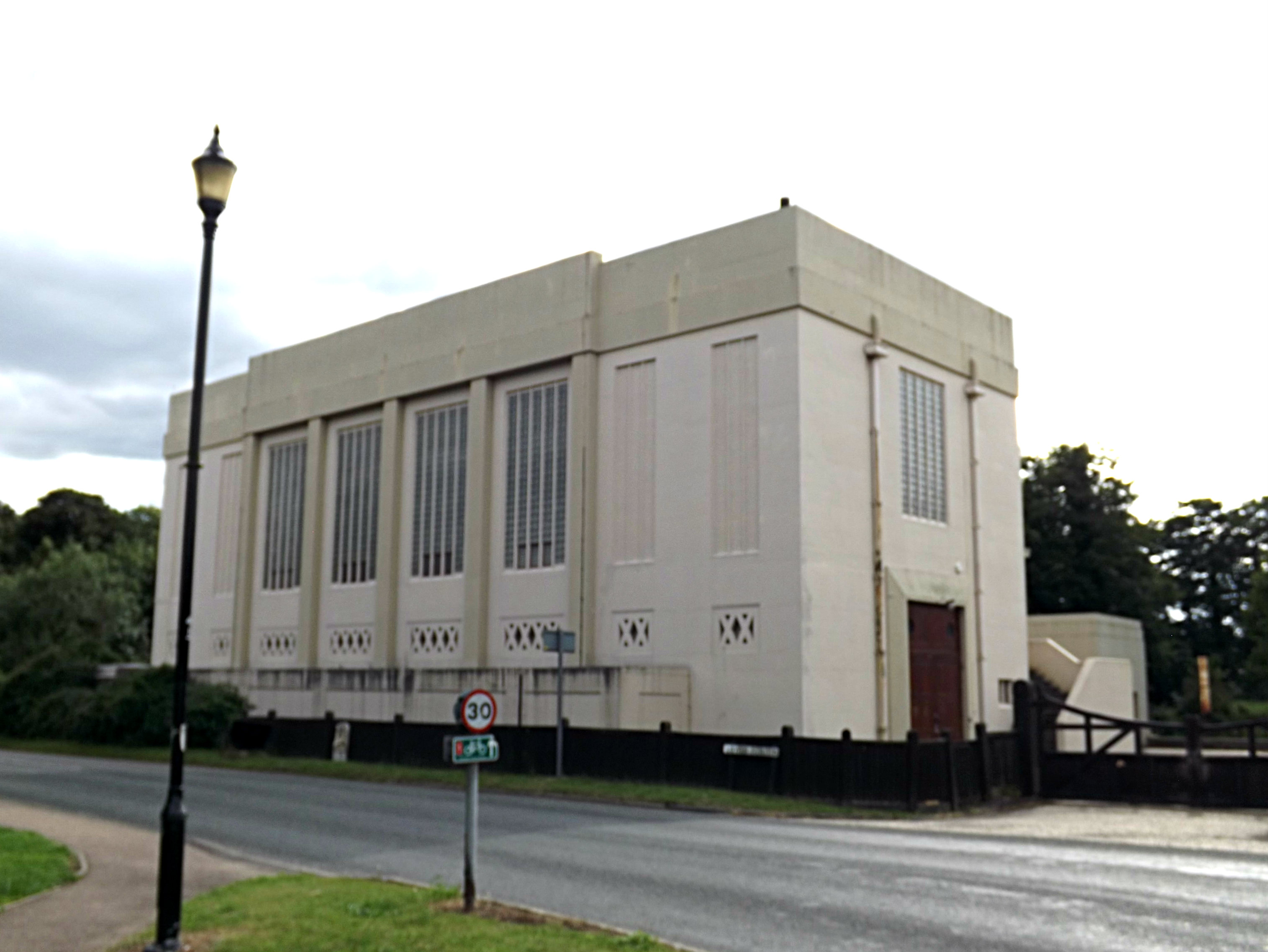
The Stratford St Mary pumping station was built in International Modernist style in the 1930s.

Although the Langham pumping station was completed in 1932, the company was convinced that it would be short of water by 1940, and obtained a second act of Parliament, the South Essex Waterworks Act 1935 (25 & 26 Geo. 5. c. xlviii), to allow it to build an extraction point at Stratford St Mary. Water would be pumped southwards to Abberton Reservoir, construction of which was authorised by the same act. The consents allowed the company to extract up to 35 million imperial gallons (160 Ml) per day, but required that 4 million imperial gallons (18 Ml) per day must continue down the river to Flatford and beyond. This was more than the river could supply, and so only the minimum allowed continued downstream. This reduced flow caused tides to flow upstream as far as Flatford, and the salt content of the tidal water was highly detrimental to the flora and fauna of the river corridor. The solution adopted was to build a further extraction point at Brantham, which meant that the flow past Stratford St Mary could be increased to 7 million imperial gallons (32 Ml) per day, and the extra abstracted at Brantham.

The continued expansion of housing stocks in south-east Essex meant that still more water was needed and in 1964, the Ely-Ouse to Essex Transfer Scheme was initiated. Water from the River Great Ouse was transferred along the Cut-off Channel to an intake at Blackdyke, from where it flows by gravity to a pumping station at Kennett. It is then pumped to Kirtling Green where it discharges into Kirtling Brook, a tributary of the Stour. The extra water flows along the Stour, where some of it is abstracted by a pumping station at Wixoe for transfer by pipeline to Great Sampford where it discharges into the River Pant, the name of the upper reaches of the River Blackwater. The remaining water increased the flow on the Stour to the pumping stations further downstream. In 2006, further extensions were made to the scheme, as part of a plan to increase the capacity of Abberton Reservoir by 60 percent. Essex and Suffolk Water can extract 99 million imperial gallons (450 Ml) per day from the Great Ouse, and the Kirtling Brook was too small to cope with this amount. A gravity pipeline was therefore built between Kirtling Green and Wixoe. Downstream, a new pumping station was built at Wormingford, which supplies a pipeline running to the western end of Abberton Reservoir. By 2019, Brantham was licensed to abstract between 1.13 and 1.87 million cubic feet (32 and 53 Ml) per day, which flows from the river to the Brantham pumping station by gravity, and is then pumped to Abberton Reservoir by one fixed-speed and two variable speed pumps.

To comply with the Eels (England and Wales) Regulations 2009 (SI 2009/3344), new screens were required on the intake from the river at Brantham, to prevent young eels, known as elvers, from being sucked into the machinery and killed. The new screens were positioned on the river side of the existing intake structure, and the rotating bandscreen was supplied by Hydrolox in 2019. It is 13 feet (3.9 m) wide and 15 feet (4.7 m) tall, and the 0.079-inch (2 mm) mesh was much finer than the course mesh originally in use at the site. A comprehensive upgrade of the Stratford St Mary's pumping station was undertaken in 2020, in view of the ageing technology and the fact that it is now licensed to abstract 36 million imperial gallons (164 Ml) per day, more than four times the amount for which it was originally designed. The pumps were replaced, allowing the volume of water removed from the river to vary between 4.4 million imperial gallons (20 Ml) per day to the full amount of the licence. New screens were required on the intake from the river, to protect elvers. A rotating screen supplied by Hydrolux was selected after considering various options, and this was cantilevered off the existing bandscreen building, to minimise disturbance to the river bed.

== Gallery ==
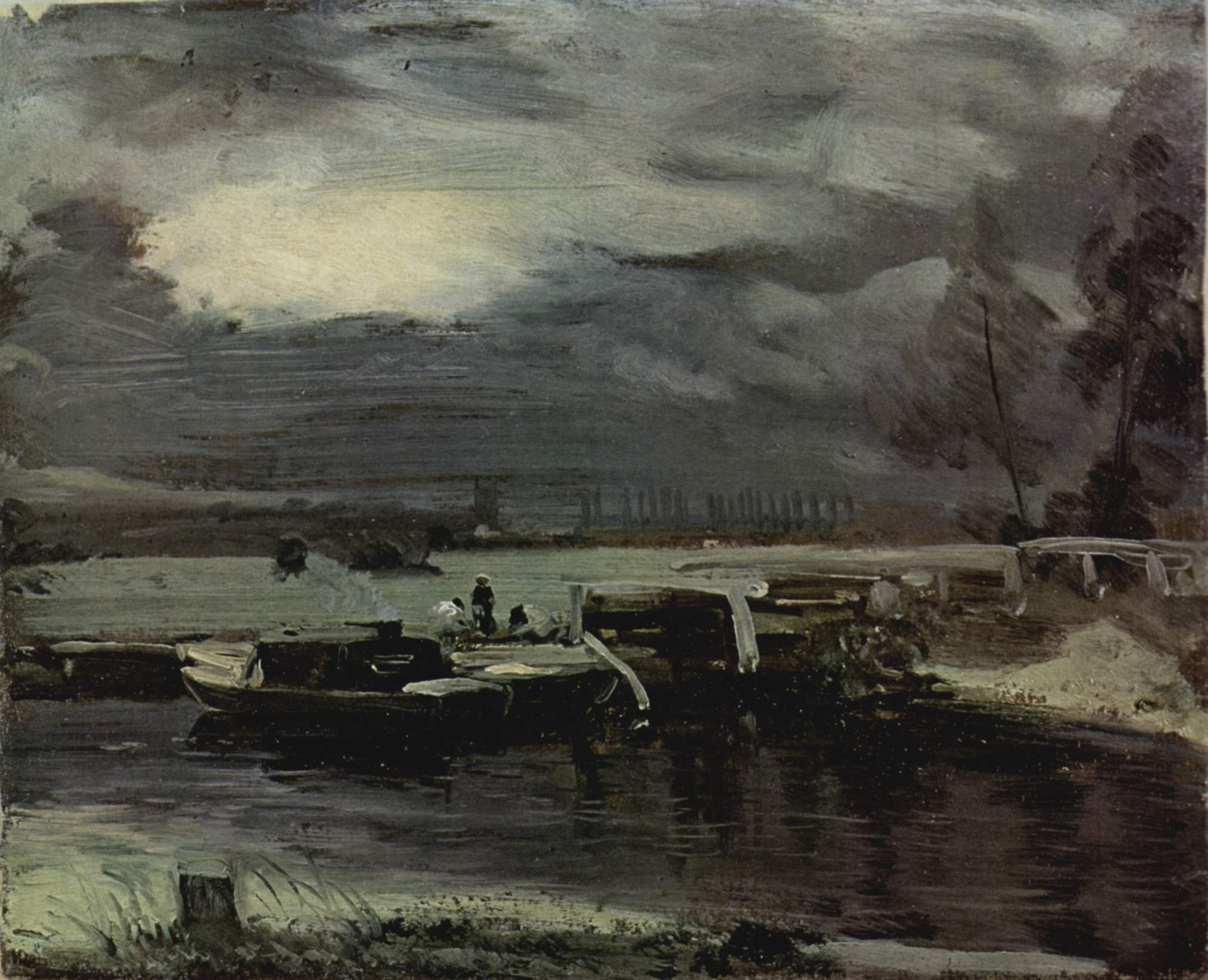
Boats on the Stour with the church of Dedham in the background, John Constable, c. 1811

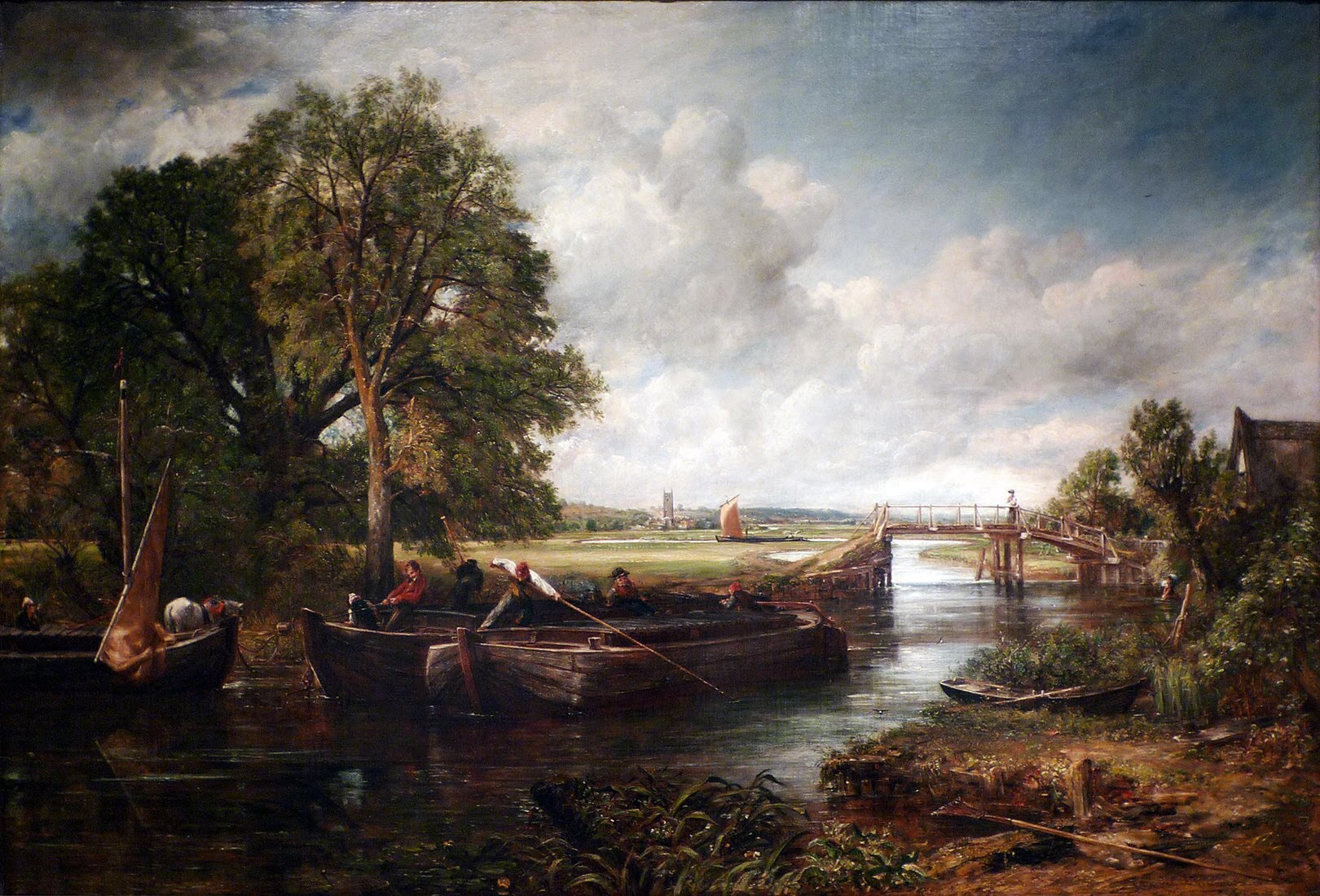
View on the Stour near Dedham, John Constable, 1822

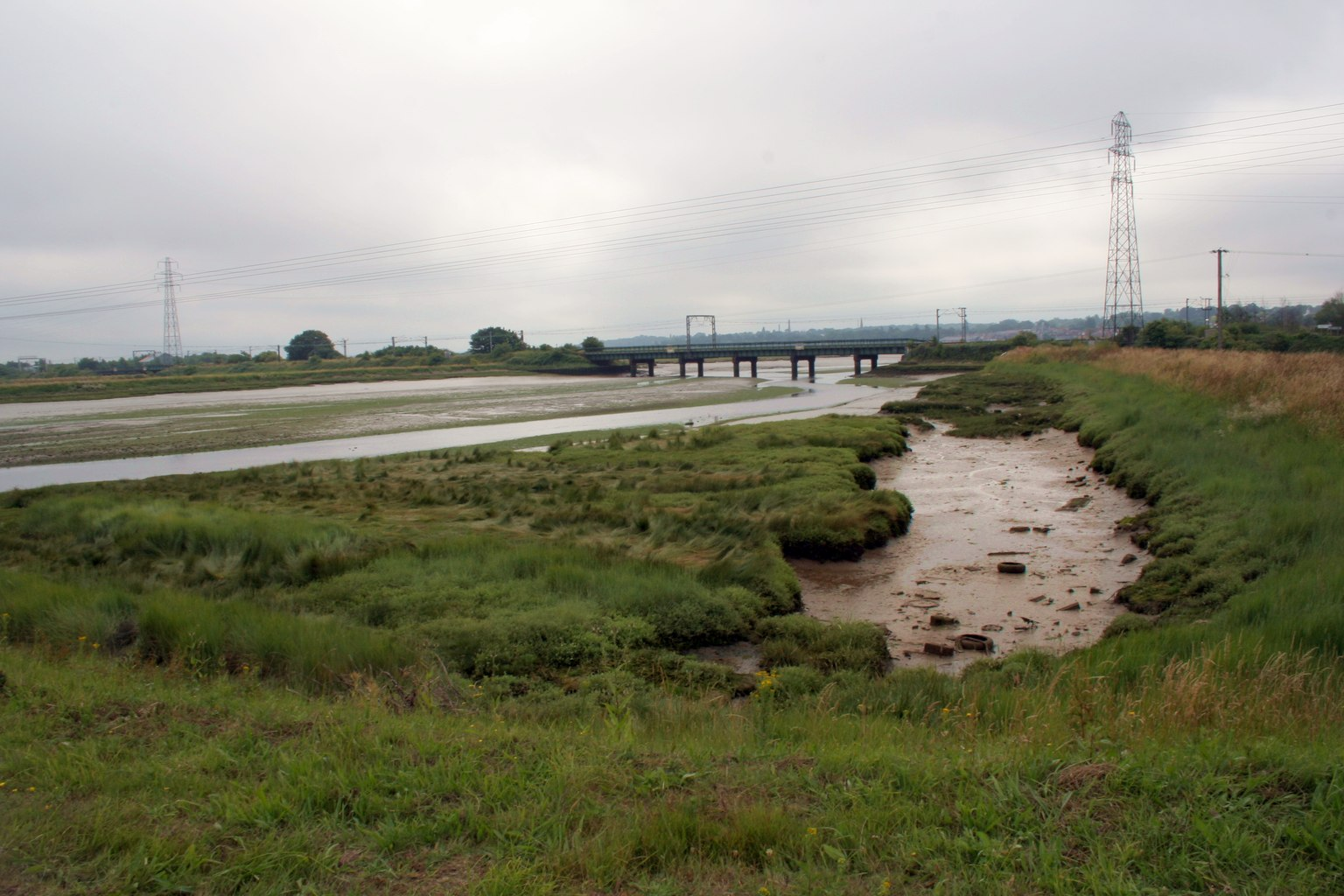
Railway bridge over River Stour near Manningtree

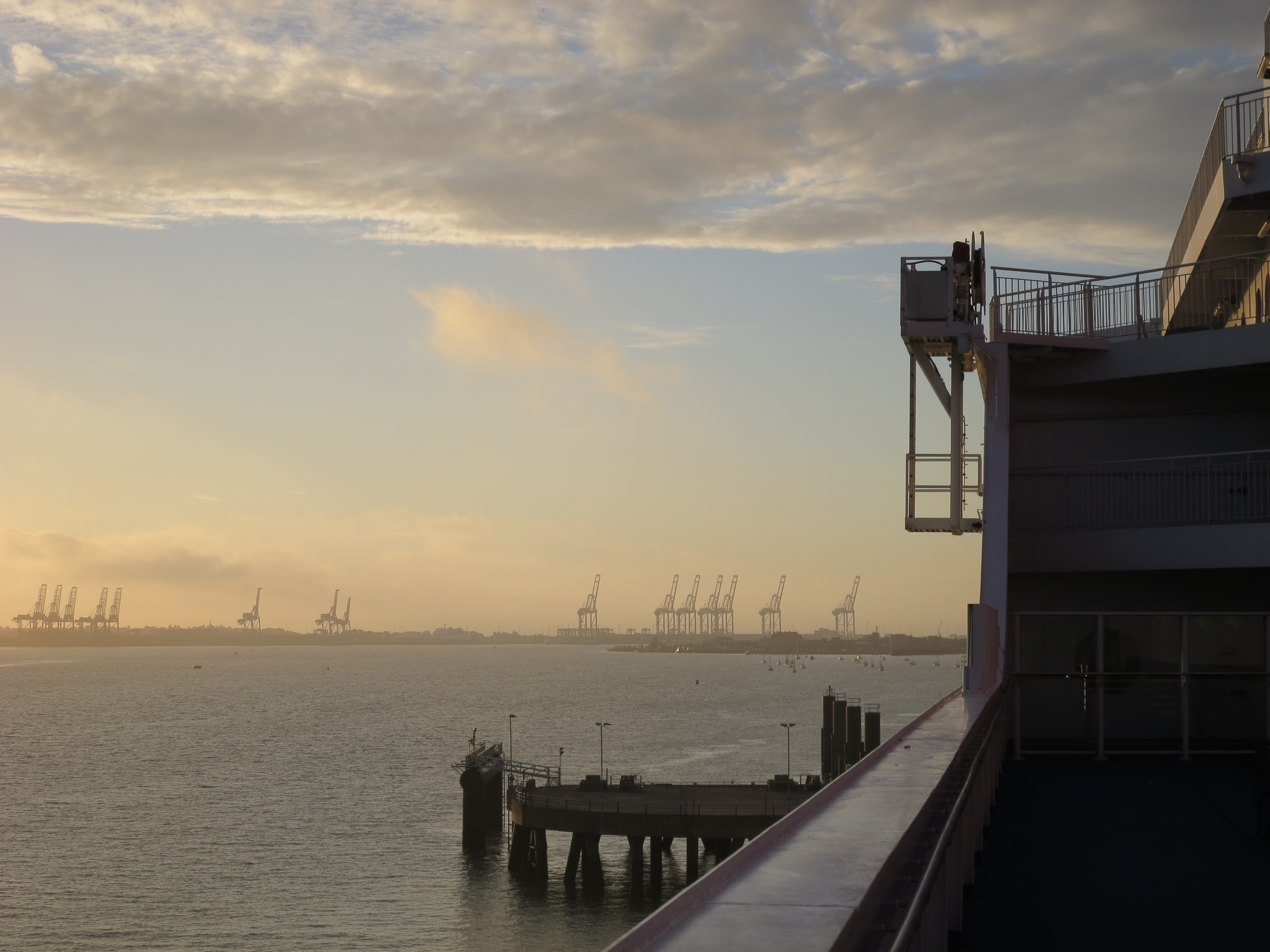
Mouth of the River Stour at Harwich

== See also ==
- List of rivers in England
- History of the British canal system

== Bibliography ==
- Asser (1983) [893]. Alfred the Great: Asser's Life of King Alfred and Other Contemporary Sources. Translated by Keynes, Simon; Lapidge, Michael. Penguin. ISBN 978-0-14-044409-4.
- Boyes, John; Russell, Ronald (1977). The Canals of Eastern England. David and Charles. ISBN 978-0-7153-7415-3.
- Cumberlidge, Jane (2009). Inland Waterways of Great Britain (8th Ed.). Imray Laurie Norie and Wilson. ISBN 978-1-84623-010-3.
- ESW (2006). "Abberton Reservoir Expansion Project" (PDF). Essex and Suffolk Water. Archived from the original (PDF) on 5 March 2016.
- Packard, Kevin (5 September 2020). "Stratford St Mary Pumping Station". Water Projects Online. Archived from the original on 21 January 2024.
- Priestley, Joseph (1831). "Historical Account of the Navigable Rivers, Canals, and Railways, of Great Britain". Archived from the original on 13 March 2016.
- Squires, Roger (2008). Britain's restored canals. Landmark Publishing. ISBN 978-1-84306-331-5.
- Starr, Christopher (2013). "The Watermills of the River Stour". Colne-Stour Countryside Association. Archived from the original on 22 March 2023.
- Wilson, Deniel; Packard, Kevin (11 November 2019). "Brantham Pumping Station". Water Projects Online. Archived from the original on 30 March 2023.
