= West Stour =

West Stour may refer to

- West Stour, Dorset, a village in the English county of Dorset
- West Stour, Kent, a watercourse in the English county of Kent
