= PS Stour (1878) =

History
- Name: PS Stour
- Operator: 1878–1900: Great Eastern Railway; 1900–????: Thames Steamboat Company
- Port of registry: (United Kingdom)
- Builder: Thames Ironworks and Shipbuilding Company
- Launched: 1878

General characteristics
- Tonnage: 112 gross register tons (GRT)
- Length: 125 feet (38 m)
- Beam: 17.6 feet (5.4 m)
- Depth: 6.8 feet (2.1 m)

PS Stour was a passenger vessel built for the Great Eastern Railway in 1878.

== History ==
The ship was built by the Thames Ironworks and Shipbuilding Company in London as a replacement for the Stour (1864). She was placed on the Ipswich to Harwich service.

On 4 August 1891, she was used as a decoy for the departure of the Empress of Germany, Augusta Victoria of Schleswig-Holstein, and her children. The Empress was due to depart from Felixstowe in the Royal Yacht Victoria and Albert. The Stour was laid with crimson carpet on the deck and seating arranged under an awning. The Stour was brought alongside Felixstowe Pier, on which a large crowd had assembled to witness the departure. However, a small steam launch belonging to the Victoria and Albert was kept in a corner of the Felixstowe Dock, and the Empress transferred from her carriage to the launch, and reached the Victoria and Albert without using the Stour.

On 16 June 1898, while crossing from Felixstowe to Harwich, Stour ran into the Trinity House boat anchored off Felixstowe. She had her gangway carried away, and a large portion of the paddlebox, and one of the paddles was damaged.

She was sold in 1900 to the Thames Steamboat Company.
