= PS Stour (1864) =

History
- Name: PS Stour
- Operator: 1864–1878: Great Eastern Railway
- Port of registry: (United Kingdom)
- Builder: James Ash, Cubitt Town, London
- Launched: 1864
- Out of service: 1878

General characteristics
- Tonnage: 87 gross register tons (GRT)
- Length: 120.5 feet (36.7 m)
- Beam: 15 feet (4.6 m)
- Depth: 6.9 feet (2.1 m)

PS Stour was a passenger vessel built for the Great Eastern Railway in 1864.

== History ==
The ship was built by James Ash of Cubitt Town in London. She was placed on the Ipswich to Harwich service.

On 26 October 1864 she came to the rescue of the Alma Company's steamer Heron, which had left Ipswich at 2.45pm and broke down opposite Levington Creek and went aground on the west side of the river. Captain Mills of the Stour went alongside and took on board all of the passengers, and managed to get the Heron back into deep water.

She was withdrawn in 1878 and replaced with a larger vessel of the same name PS Stour.
