= Stratford St. Mary =

Village in Suffolk, England

Coordinates: 51.967°N 0.967°E

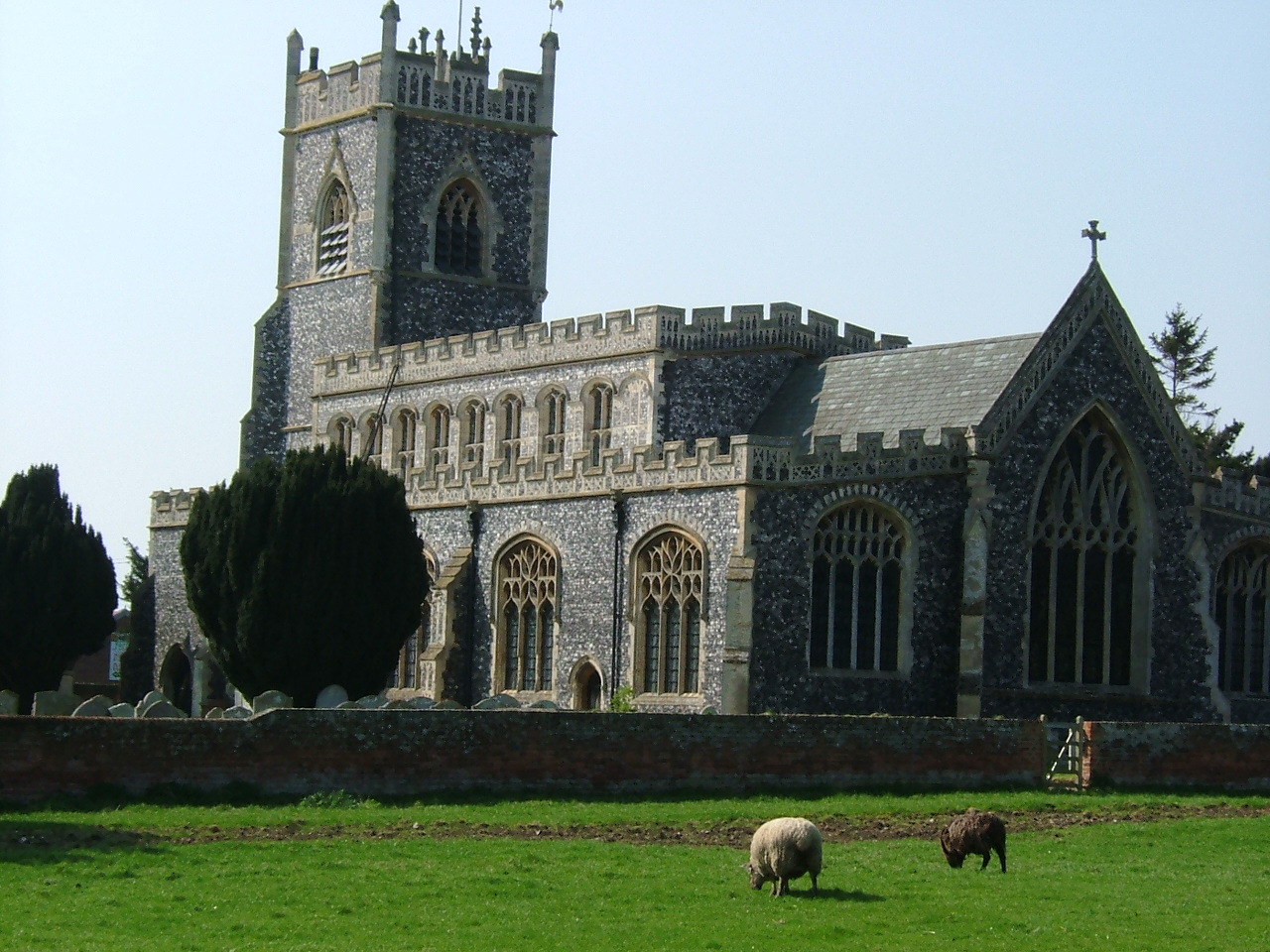
- Stratford St Mary church in spring time

- Location within Suffolk
- Population: 701 (2011)
- District: Babergh
- Shire county: Suffolk
- Region: East
- Country: England
- Sovereign state: United Kingdom
- Post town: Colchester
- Postcode district: CO7

Stratford St. Mary is a village in Suffolk, England in the heart of 'Constable Country'. John Constable painted a number of paintings in and around Stratford.

Stratford (the ford of the Roman Via Strata) with its attached hamlet of Higham sits on the Suffolk/Essex border on the River Stour, Suffolk. It is 58 miles (93 km) from London just off the A12 between Colchester and Ipswich. The village has a fifteenth-century flint faced church which is clearly visible from the A12. It is also served by a primary school, post office and village store, and three pubs. Stratford village is within the Stratford Vale which is also recognised as an area of outstanding natural beauty.

== History of the parish ==
Evidence of Stratford's antiquity includes traces of a henge from c. 4,000BC, and Roman remains on Gun Hill. The original Saxon settlement comprising 30 tenants and a mill mentioned in the Domesday Book of 1086 was abandoned as settlement grew along the river and the road to Bergholt.

A series of manorial court rolls beginning in 1318 reveal that many of the medieval families were connected with the wool trade which accounts for much of its early prosperity. Benefactors included wealthy clothiers like the Mors (or Morse) family who generously endowed the church. Stratford's long, straggling main street lined with inns, provides evidence of its bustling prosperity in the coaching days when the town catered for a continuous traffic of cattle, turkeys and geese bound for the London market. The parish was in the hundred of Samford.

The national censuses from 1801 and 1901 record just over 500 inhabitants in the parish.

== Places of historical interest in the village ==
Lowe Hill House, the finest of the surviving houses, dates from c.1480 and is described in the 1619 manorial survey, although it is probably not the original manor house.

Ravenys on one of the sites is the subject of a picture by John Constable entitled "a house in Water Lane", now in the Victoria and Albert Museum. The Lord of the Manor made a grant of the land on which it stands to William Smyth and William Wade in 1442 on condition that they rebuilt the house for which the lord would provide timber for the "grounsill, overweys and prynspales", the two Williams being responsible for the cutting and carting of it. It is impossible to be certain of the earlier names of the other two cottages, but the second structure, which incorporates a small portion of an earlier building stands on or very close to what was the home of the Wynter family. For 240 years from 1318 the Wynters farmed a smallholding in the meadows just south of it. The third house in the lane was most probably the home of the Selbricht family until it died out in 1558. The remaining house in this part of the village, which stands two hundred yards nearer to the river, was occupied by Matilda Hunt in 1481. The barn behind it is still known as Hunt's Barn.

Gatemans, the home of weaver Ralph Gateman in 1334, is now the oldest surviving house in the village.

Thornes was the original name of the house front frontage behind Gatemans; significantly enlarged in the 19th century and later and is now known as Courtlands.

Fyshers was the original name of the house now occupied by the redbrick Old Cage House, named after the pound for stray cattle and horses that once occupied the site of the parish room cottage holding for the proverbial "three acres and a cow".

Three original houses survive on the next six half acre holdings, the rest have been replaced as more cottages have been squeezed in. Further towards the river in Lower Street the houses were always packed closer together. In 1587 Sir William Fisher the elder who lived either in Rose Bank or The Old Cottage next door complained of the noisy and noisome "hoggiscote and hennesroust" placed against his wall by Ralph Boyfield.

Three coaching inns – The Anchor, The Swan and the Black Horse – grew up as a result of the growing traffic through the village. The Anchor had 20 acres (8.1 ha) of pasture for cattle bound for the London market. The Swan which is described in Road Books as a posting-house, had extensive stabling and accommodation for casual labourers who followed the progress of Haysel and Harvest from south to north through East Anglia. George II stayed here for a few hours in 1737. The Black Horse has connections with the highwayman Mathew Keys, hanged on Kennington Common in 1751, who once left his watch here as a pledge for a reckoning.

Goose acre, the marshy pightle attached to the Corner House, provided an overnight pen for geese and turkeys en route to London, as did the ground behind Riversdale house.

Fords, a fine timber house with a meadow alongside opposite the Black Horse, is close to a narrow strip of waste land which marks the line of the old London road. The road now passes close to the front of the cottages on the river bank now known as "the Island" and across the eastern end of the Talbooth Hotel.

Le Talbooth, originally known as Leggs, was formerly a pair of cottages with their own quay and lime kiln. Chalk was brought by barge from Great Cornard near Sudbury and coal from Manningtree and Mistley. It was first described as the Tolbooth in 1659. Merchandise was weighed here and tolls charged for upkeep of the tall, narrow toll bridge. The weirs and locks placed across the river made the area prone to flooding when the river rose.

Skalders, (now replaced by Riversdale, the modern house next to Fords) was the home of the Mors family for 200 years. Thomas Mors, the first to appear in the records, was one of three wealthy clothiers in the village, and a generous benefactor to the church. His wife Margaret Webb from Dedham and her parents played a large part in building and improving the church. Azal Mors, the last of the family, sold most of the family property in 1615 and left the village. His mother stayed in the family home to live on the rents of two or three cottages and her half share in the new water mill.

The old Stratford Mill shown in Constable's painting dates from around 1600. A group of Sudbury Merchants and gentlemen formed "The Stower Navigation Company" in 1708, making the river navigable to bring coal upriver and to transport corn, straw and hay downstream to be offloaded and shipped to London. It was a busy, prosperous waterway until the railways took away the trade. The mill was demolished about 1850 and replaced by a vast structure of five floors with a 15-foot (4.6 m) undershot water wheel and an auxiliary steam engine for use when the river was low.

Stratford Hall Manor had three great Open Fields: Stregmer, Hatters Field and East Croft. The Common Meadow was about 60 acres (240,000 m^{2}), running along the Stour between the river and the west side of the village.

Several substantial Tudor Halls were constructed by wealthy clothiers and gentry, including the Manor of Veyseys and Veyseys Farm; the Woadhouse and its attached buildings, built by Thomas Woadhouse of Dedham in 1501 to replace a much older hall called Afrettles; Typlands Farm, Leatherjacket Farm and Squirrels Hall to the north from c. 1480.

== Bibliography ==
- John H.H. Griffin (March 1968). Stratford St Mary and its Church.
- G.O. Rickword (1948). Constable's Country, guide to the Vale of Dedham. Colchester.
- Victoria County History of Suffolk, Vols. I, II (ed. W. Page) Institute of Historical Research (1911)
