= Cobb & Co. (New Zealand) =

Company that operated a fleet of stagecoaches in Australia

Cobb & Co. is the name of a company that operated a fleet of stagecoaches in Australia in the late 19th century. Cobb & Co. itself did not operate in New Zealand officially but its name was used by many private stage coach operators.

== History ==
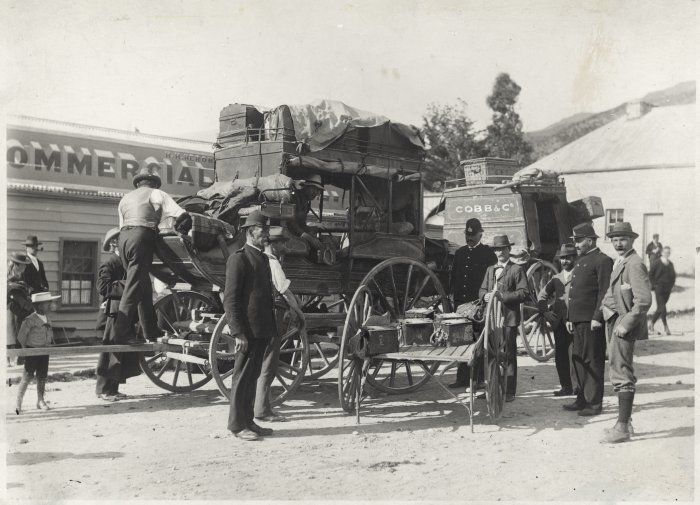
Gold transport and escort Roxburgh 1901

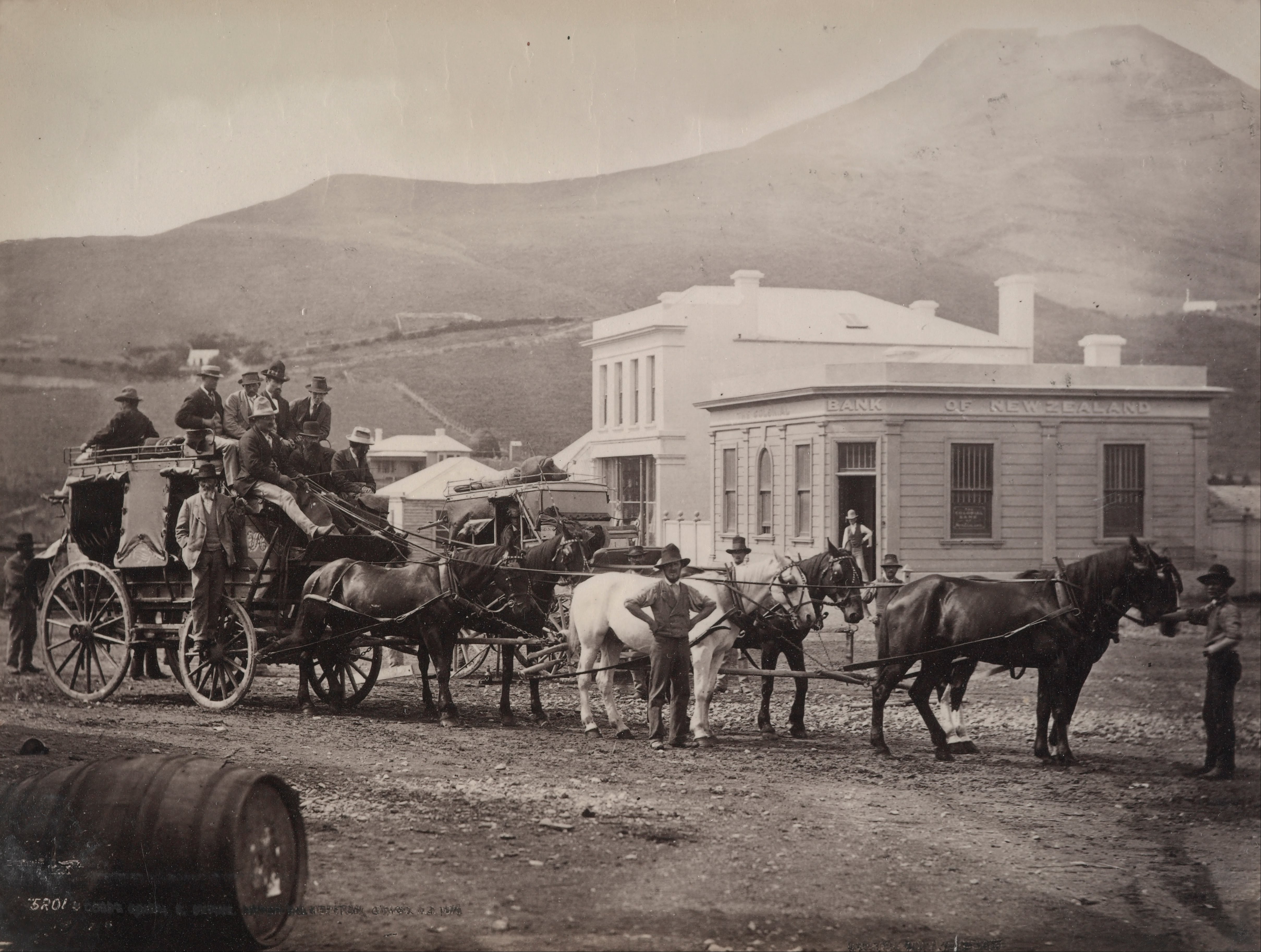
Cobb & Co. coach at Palmerston, Otago in the 1880s

In 1861, the discovery of gold in Gabriel's Gully, Otago, prompted a gold rush and saw many Australian gold-diggers heading for the port of Dunedin. Among these was the Cobb & Co coach proprietor Charles Cole, who had been running a service from Smythe's Creek to Ballarat in Australia. He chartered the steamship SS India at Geelong and on 4 October 1861 landed in Dunedin with one Concord stagecoach, five wagons, a buggy and 34 horses.

A vast improvement in comfort because of their style of suspension suited to extremely rough roads, the new American Concord coaches were built by Abbot-Downing Company of Concord, New Hampshire. Like other fully equipped stagecoaches each had a centre door with a glass window which could be raised or lowered and the openings on either side had curtains of American leather which rolled up and down to keep out the weather. The interior was upholstered in crimson plush, while the outside was painted red, with gold ornamentation. A box seat and roof seat allowed the coach to carry five extra outside passengers, with six to nine seated on benches inside.

One week after landing, Cole's first "Cobb & Co Telegraph Line of Coaches" left the Provincial Hotel, Dunedin for the Police Commissioner's Camp at Gabriel's Gully. Changing stations for the horses had already been arranged at the Reliance Hotel, Otokia at Tokomairiro, Round Hill and Waitahuna.

In February 1862, the Hoyts came to New Zealand, landing their coach and horses at Bluff. They moved to Dunedin when they found there was no direct route to reach the gold diggings from there and linked up in partnership with C.Cole, trading as Cole, Hoyt & Co., proprietors of Cobb & Co. Telegraph Line of Coaches.

The passenger coach service began to operate on a regular basis from Dunedin to Waikouaiti. Passengers who travelled on this line for Oamaru and beyond, were transferred to a light two horse wagon for the final part of their journey, where they were met by private contractors to take them to the Ferry Service at Waitaki.

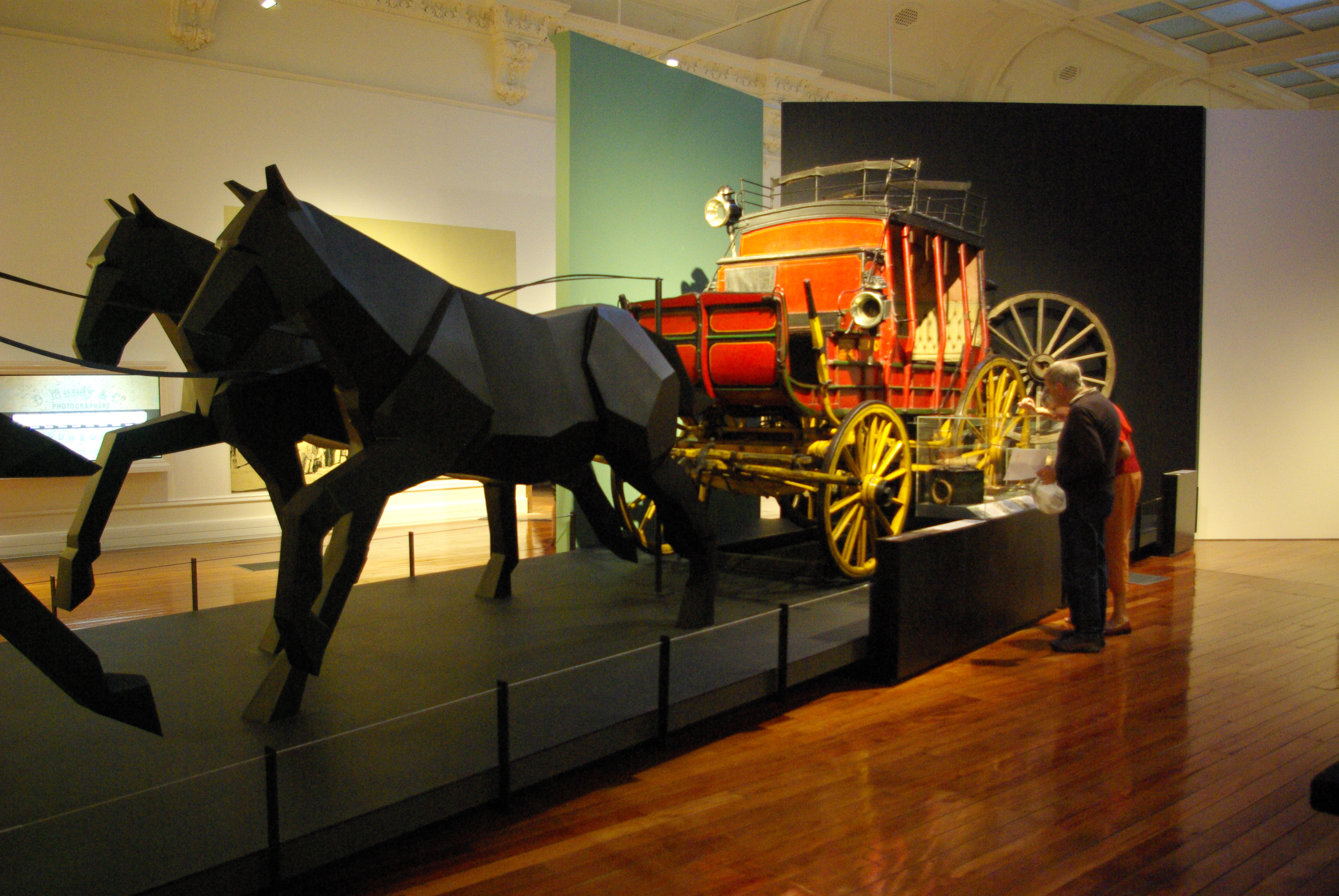
Concord-style stagecoach preserved in Toitū, Dunedin

By April 1862, Hoyt decided to put a four horse coach team on the run, with a service of three times a week at a fare of £3 each way. The route lay through Palmerston and over the Horse Range where stops were made at the Hampden Hotel and the Otepopo Inn, before the leg to the Northern Hotel, Oamaru or on to the Waitaki River Ferry Service.

By 1863 a reasonable roadway had been cut through from Timaru to Christchurch. A Cobb & Co coachline in Timaru soon opened up with a passenger service on this route running to the north. Within a short time the coachline advertised additional services south to the River Ferry at Waitaki so linking the route with the Dunedin/Oamaru coach-teams from the lower South Island.

Lady Barker recalled a hair-raising coach trip in the 1860s.

The advent of motorised transport led to the inevitable decline in stage coach travel. The last advertised Cobb & Co coach runs were Arrowtown-Queenstown and Arrowtown-Dunedin in February 1925. A Cobb & Co coach was paraded through Christchurch during their 75th anniversary celebrations in 1925.

Concord coaches have been preserved at the Fairlie Heritage Museum and Toitū Otago Settlers Museum.
