= Concord coach =

Type of horse-drawn coach

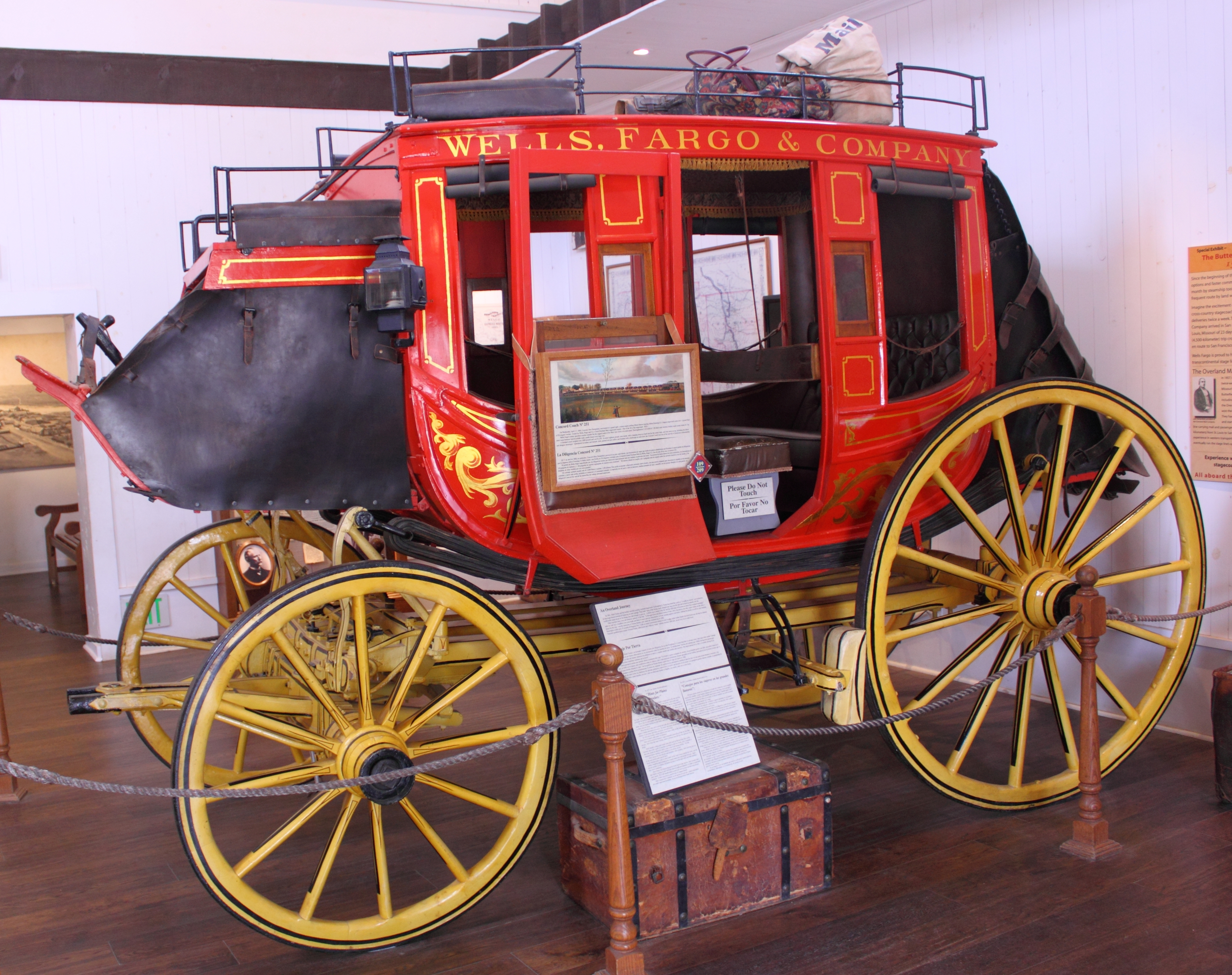
Concord Coach in Wells Fargo livery with leather-covered front and back boots

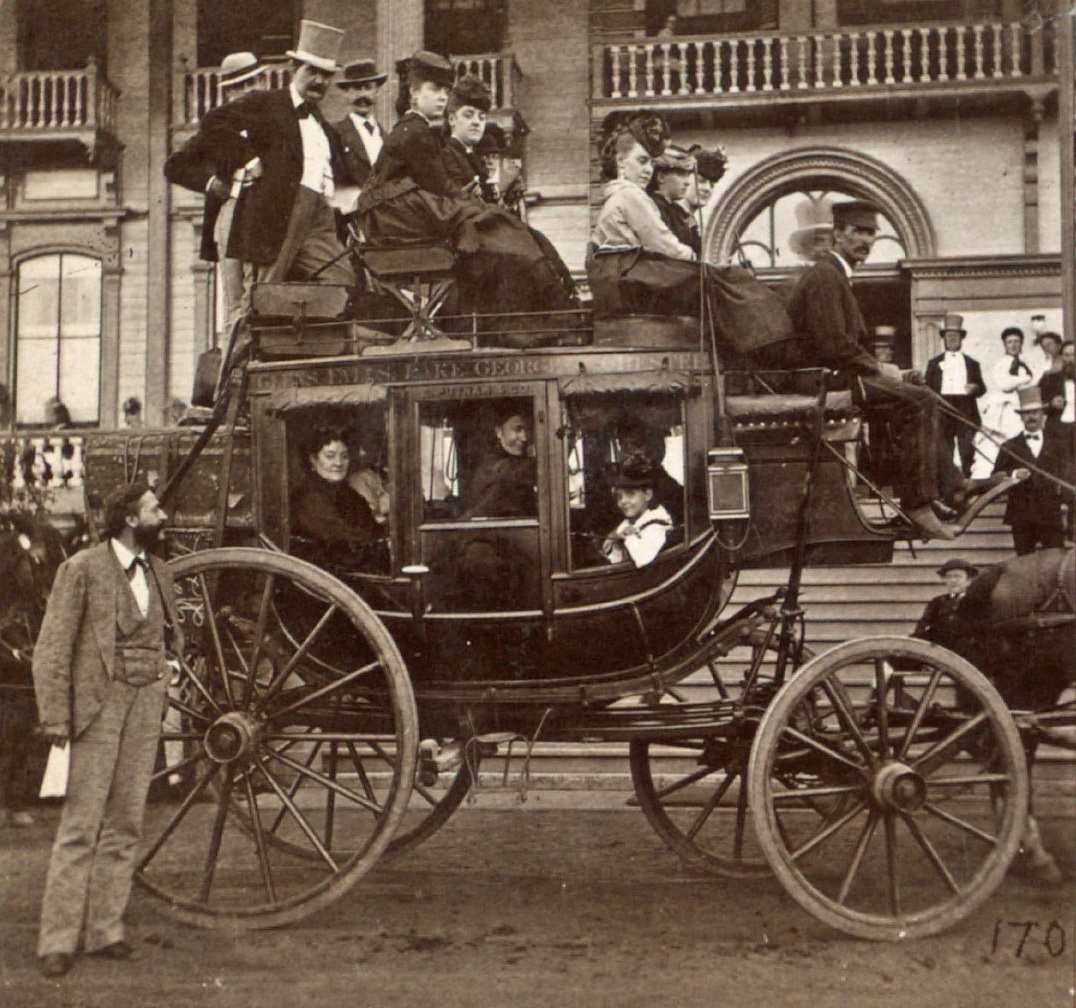
Glen's Falls, Lake George & Chester stagecoach c. 1880

The Concord coach is an American horse-drawn coach that was used as stagecoaches, mailcoaches, and hotel coaches. The term was first used for the coaches built by Abbot-Downing Company in Concord, New Hampshire. Concord coaches were built with a suspension system particularly suited to North American conditions in their era. Their running gear suited a wide range of road conditions, and it was repairable without highly skilled metalworkers. Leather thoroughbraces suspend the coach body, keeping it in constant motion while traveling. Swaying is an inherent result of thoroughbrace suspension, providing shock-absorbing action over rough ground. In England, where the roads were smoother, this suspension method had long been replaced by steel springs. Concord coaches were high-end, expensive vehicles with a long service life. The thoroughbrace suspension reduced structural stress and improved passenger comfort.

== Design ==
The Concord coach has an oval or egg-shaped appearance. Eastern US versions were usually painted in more conservative colors and smaller than their Western counterparts. The Western versions were painted in bright colors and designs. In both cases, the underworks were painted yellow or cream in contrast with the body color. The coach body is suspended by strong leather straps called thoroughbraces. Most model have an external luggage compartment or boot at the back of the coach, another boot for valuables below the driver's seat at the front, and a roof rack. Wooden brake blocks press against the iron tires of the rear wheels and are controlled by the driver with a foot lever to his right.

Coaches were built to order, and would hold six, nine, or twelve passengers—some late versions even carried sixteen. Inside the coach are bench seats. The first and last seats inside have limited headroom because of the curvature of the floor. Passengers on the center bench have no backrest but can steady themselves with a broad leather harness suspended across the coach by straps from the roof. In some models, up to six passengers can travel on the roof.

One 9-passenger Concord at the Henry Ford Museum weighs 2,500 pounds (1,100 kg) and stands over 9 feet (2.7 m) tall.

Details

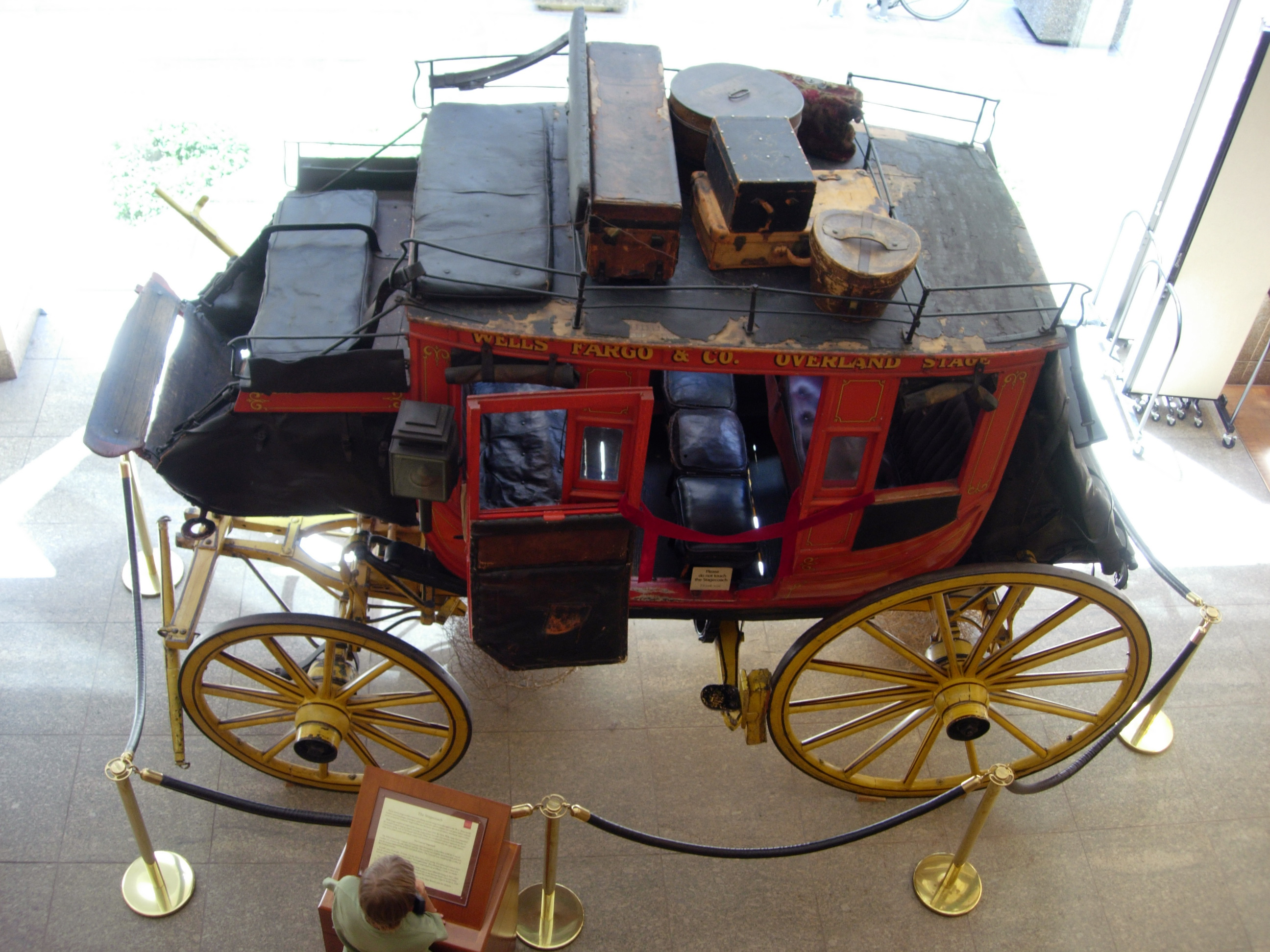
Storage space on the roof

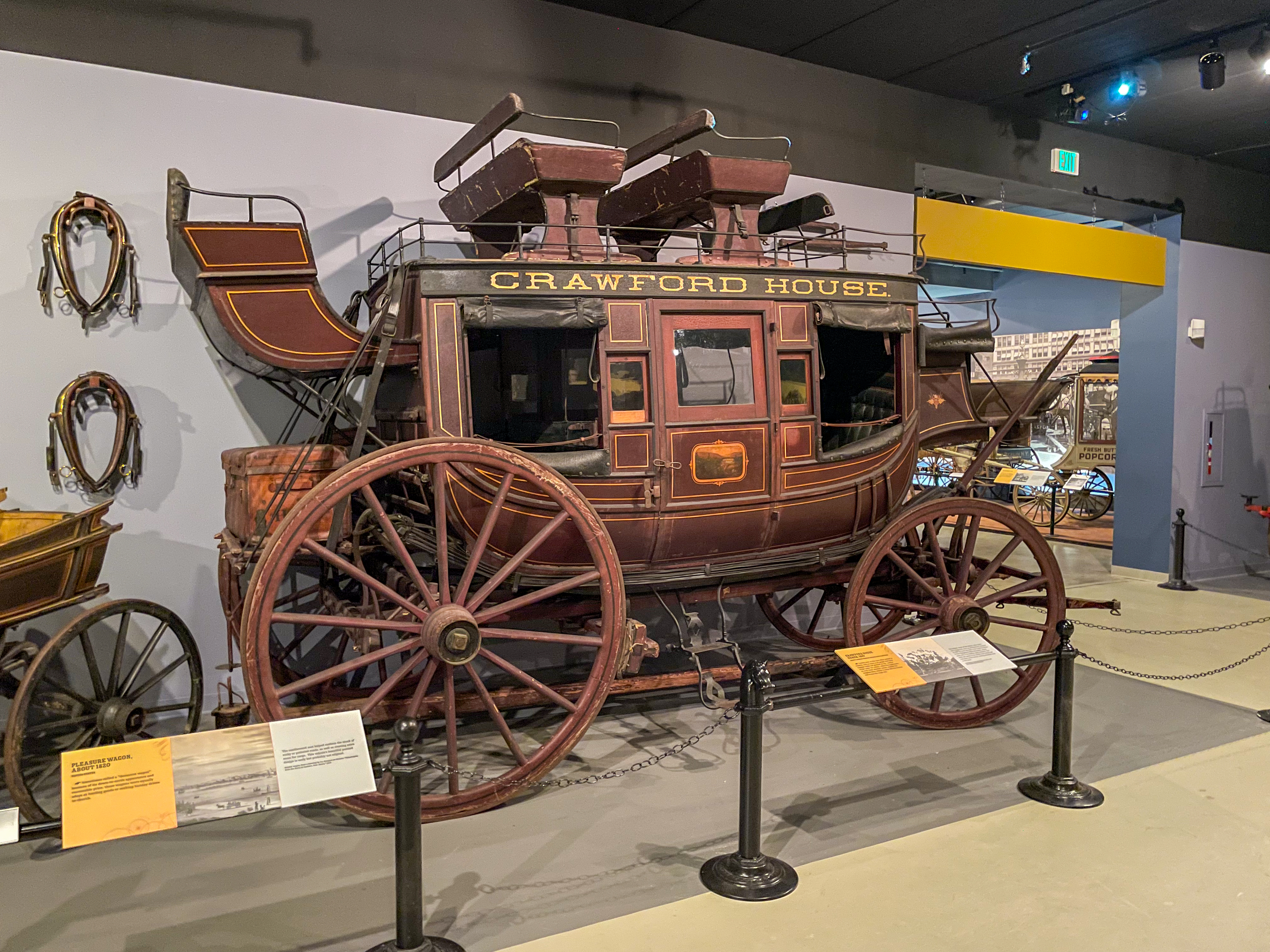
An 1867 hotel coach with sightseeing seats on the roof

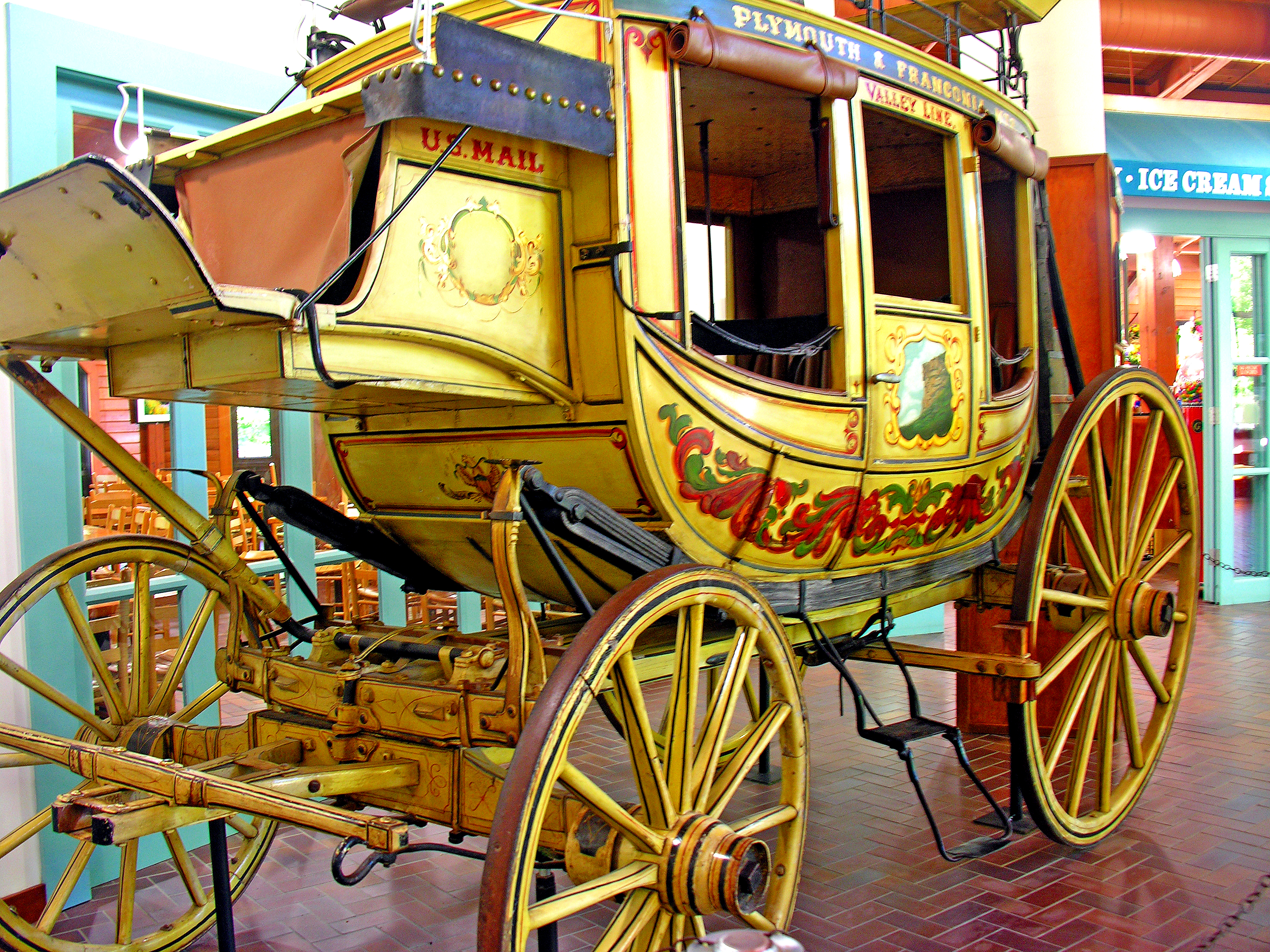
Front quarter view, shows undercarriage and suspension

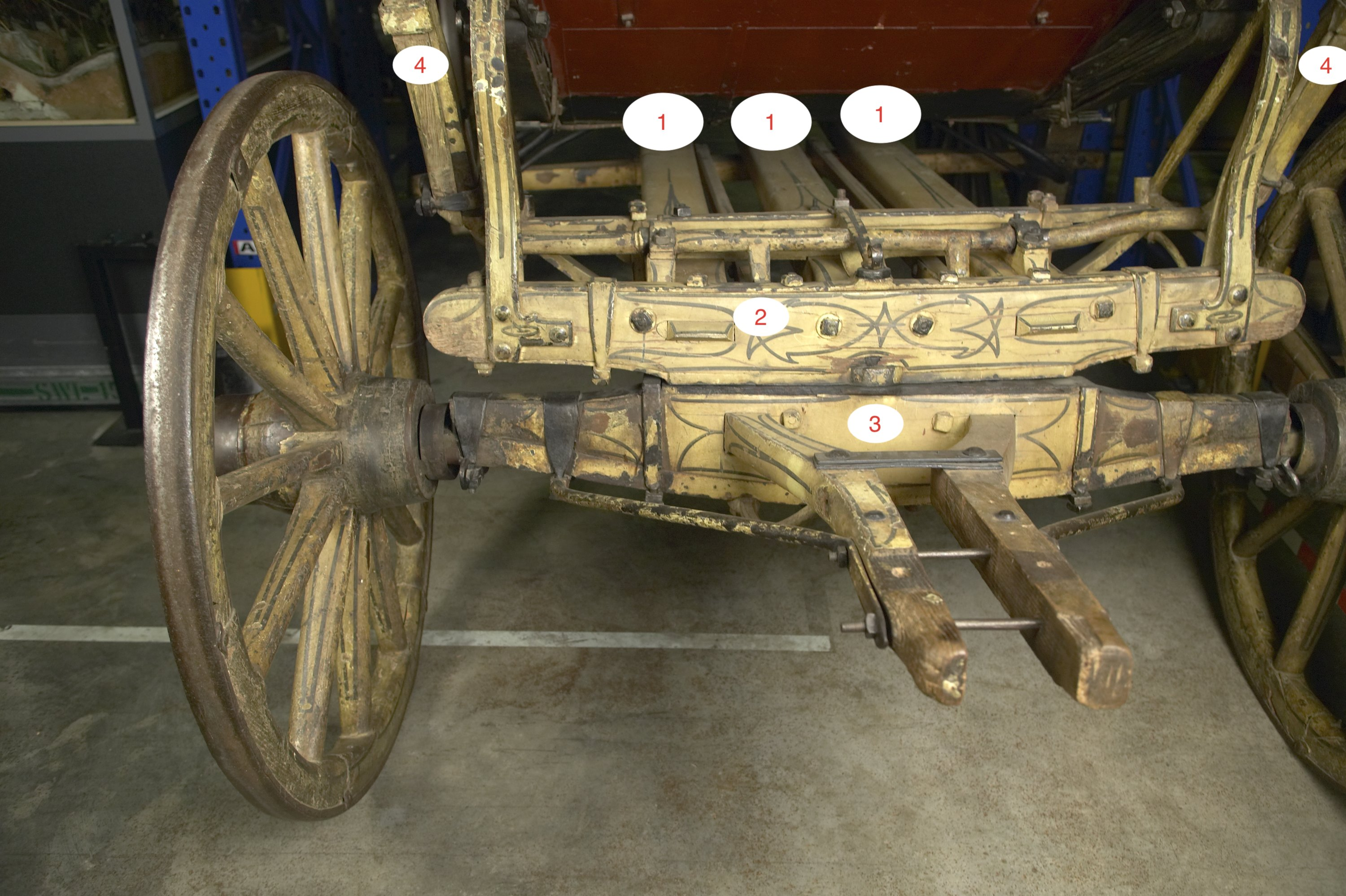
Undercarriage, showing perches, transom, and brake levers (Note: (1) three longitudinal perches, (2) front transom supporting the metal uprights, (3) front axle with link for the pole, (4) brake levers on the outside edge either side)

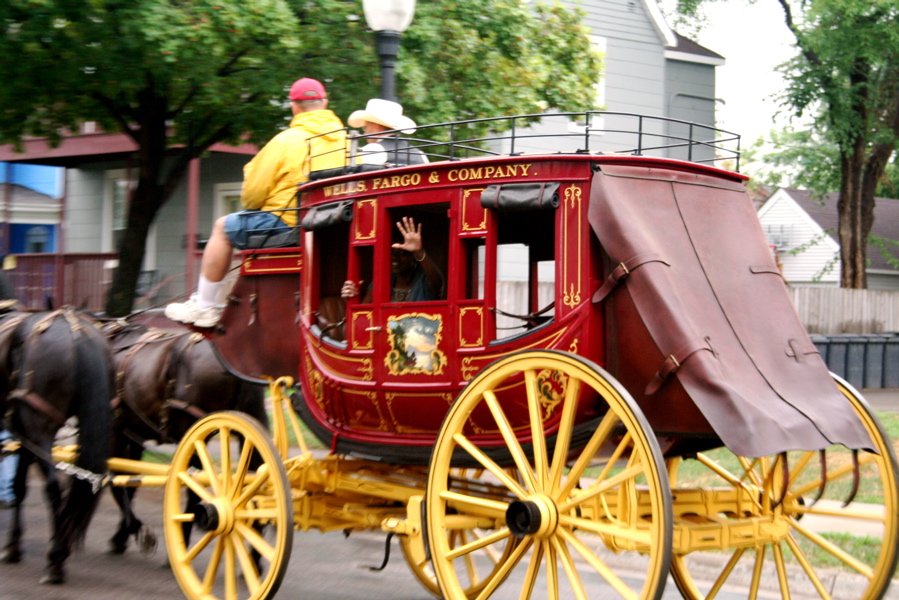
Rear quarter view, shows the leather boot style for luggage

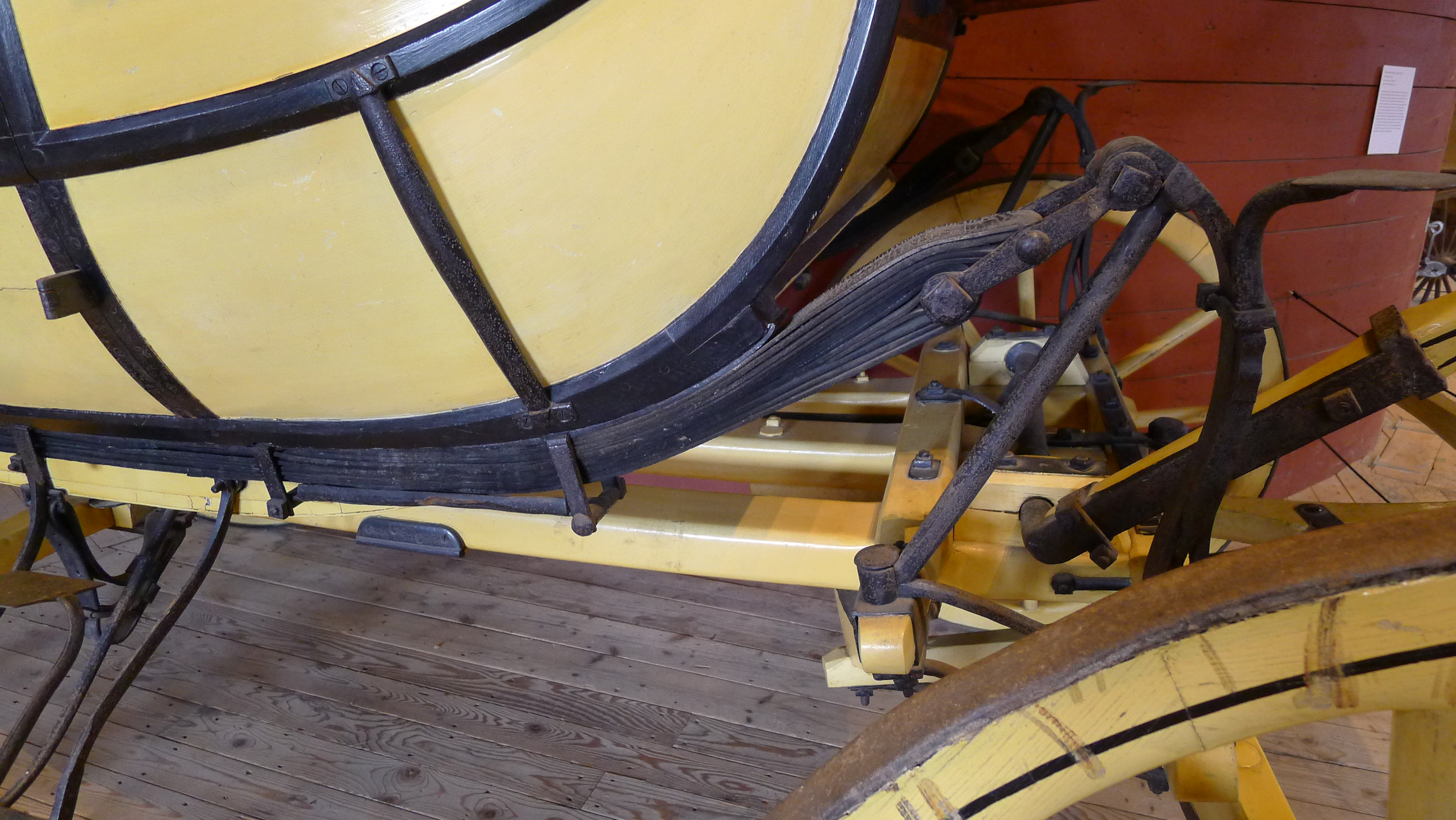
Closeup of thoroughbraces

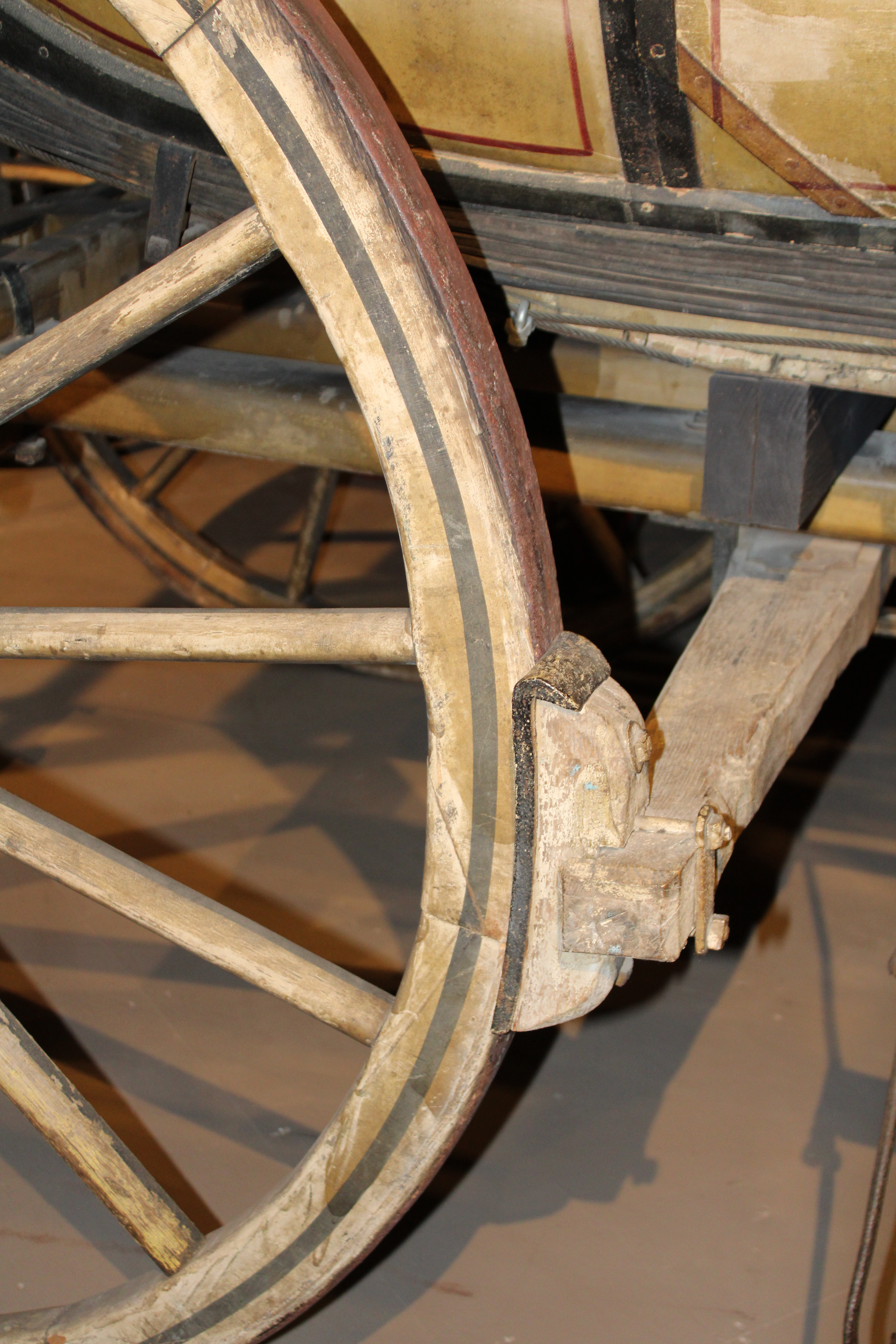
Brake

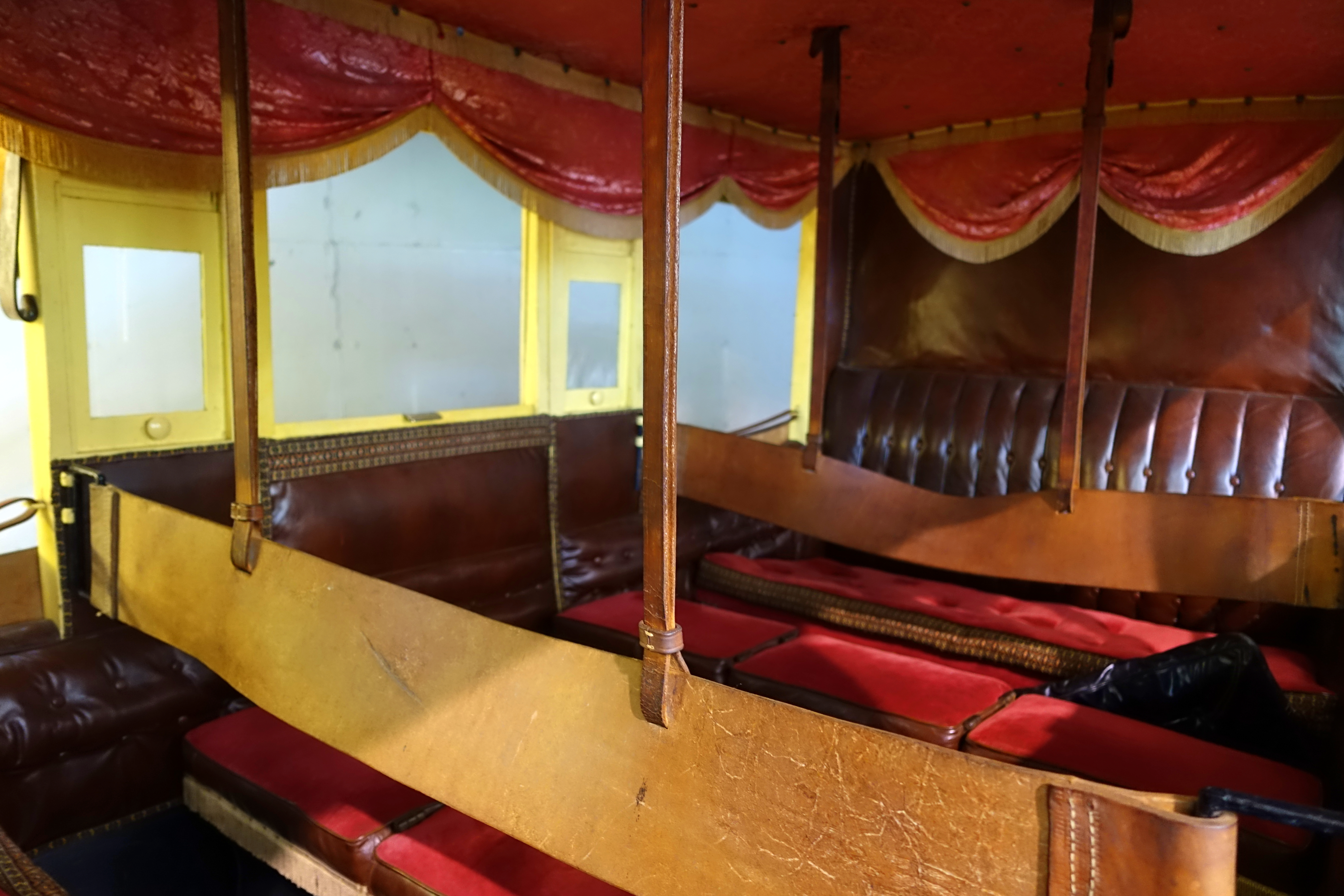
Interior seating

=== Variations ===
Abbot-Downing also constructed a simpler, lighter, and less expensive vehicle which they named Overland wagon and later Western passenger wagon.

Concord-style stagecoaches were built by Cobb & Co and Cobb & Co. (New Zealand), and used in Australia and New Zealand.

== Historical context ==
It is often claimed that Concord coaches were copied from the style of the slightly earlier public traveling coaches of Troy, New York. Berkebile writes that the Troy coaches probably looked very similar to the Concords, that there are no unattested illustrations of Troys, and that many unmarked coaches may in fact be Troys. The style, made famous by Abbott-Downing, was the most popular coach in North America, and the designs were copied by other coachbuilders. Versions of the coach were used in Australia, New Zealand and South Africa.

Robert Sallmann wrote a comparison of the American Concord coach to the English road coaches in Europe, noting how the two continents developed separate styles of construction and driving. England had by 1815 started to build Macadam roads with proper roadbeds, and the Golden Age of Coaching began. America didn't have these roads, and when people pushed westward, the roads were often mere trails. English coaches with their solid spring systems had been imported to America, but they didn't hold up because going over bumps with a loaded coach would hammer the springs through the undercarriage. In response, American coachbuilders resorted to using thoroughbraces for suspension, an earlier "leather strap hammock" suspension style used in England before the roads were improved.

Using thoroughbraces with moving horses over uneven ground causes the entire body of the coach to sway. The shifting body of the coach causes the driver to shift in relation to the horses. The English coach driver, sitting on a relatively stiff coach with horses harnessed firmly, could sit still with his reins in one hand. On the other hand, the American coach driver held the reins in both hands, leaned forward, and used elbows and whole arms and body to keep a steady contact with the horses' mouths through the reins. Harnesses were likewise loosened to allow horses more choice to pick their path over uneven ground.

Sallmann also describes some benefit to the natural swing of the thoroughbraces allowing the horses to pull a heavy coach over bumps while the coach's weight is effectively suspended momentarily in mid-air.

Railroads began replacing stagecoaches in the middle of the 19th century, but Concord coaches remained in commercial use into the 20th century.

== Modern usage ==
Concord coaches are used in parades, demonstrations, and historical reenactments. Many Concord coaches are on display in carriage museums, transport museums, Wells Fargo bank branch lobbies, and even a casino. According to signage at the Collings Foundation display of Concord Coach No. 206, in the 1970s it was "estimated that of the 3,000 Concord Coaches built by Abbott-Downing from 1847 to 1899, less than 150 survive".

Concord coaches today

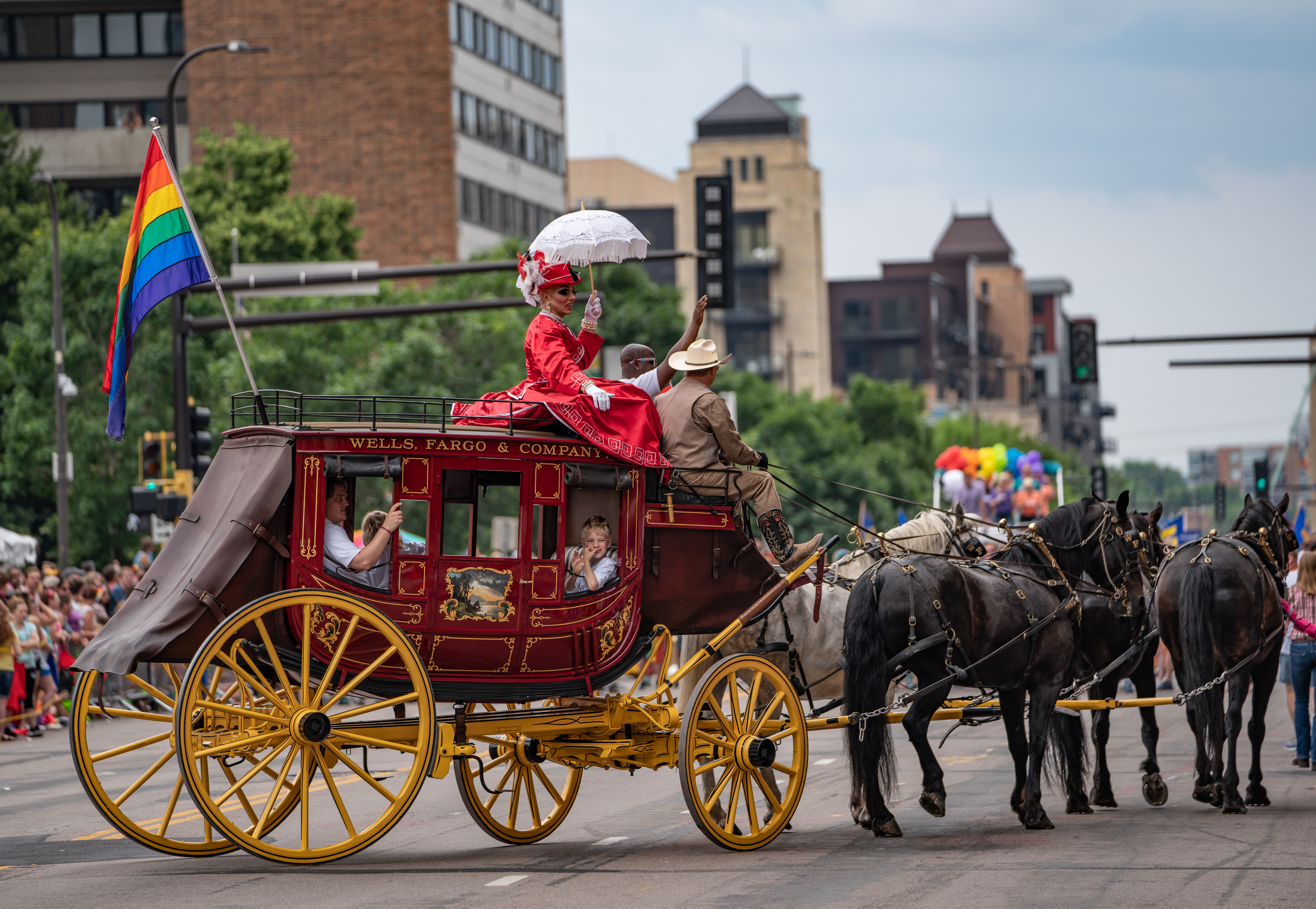
2018 parade in Minneapolis, Minnesota

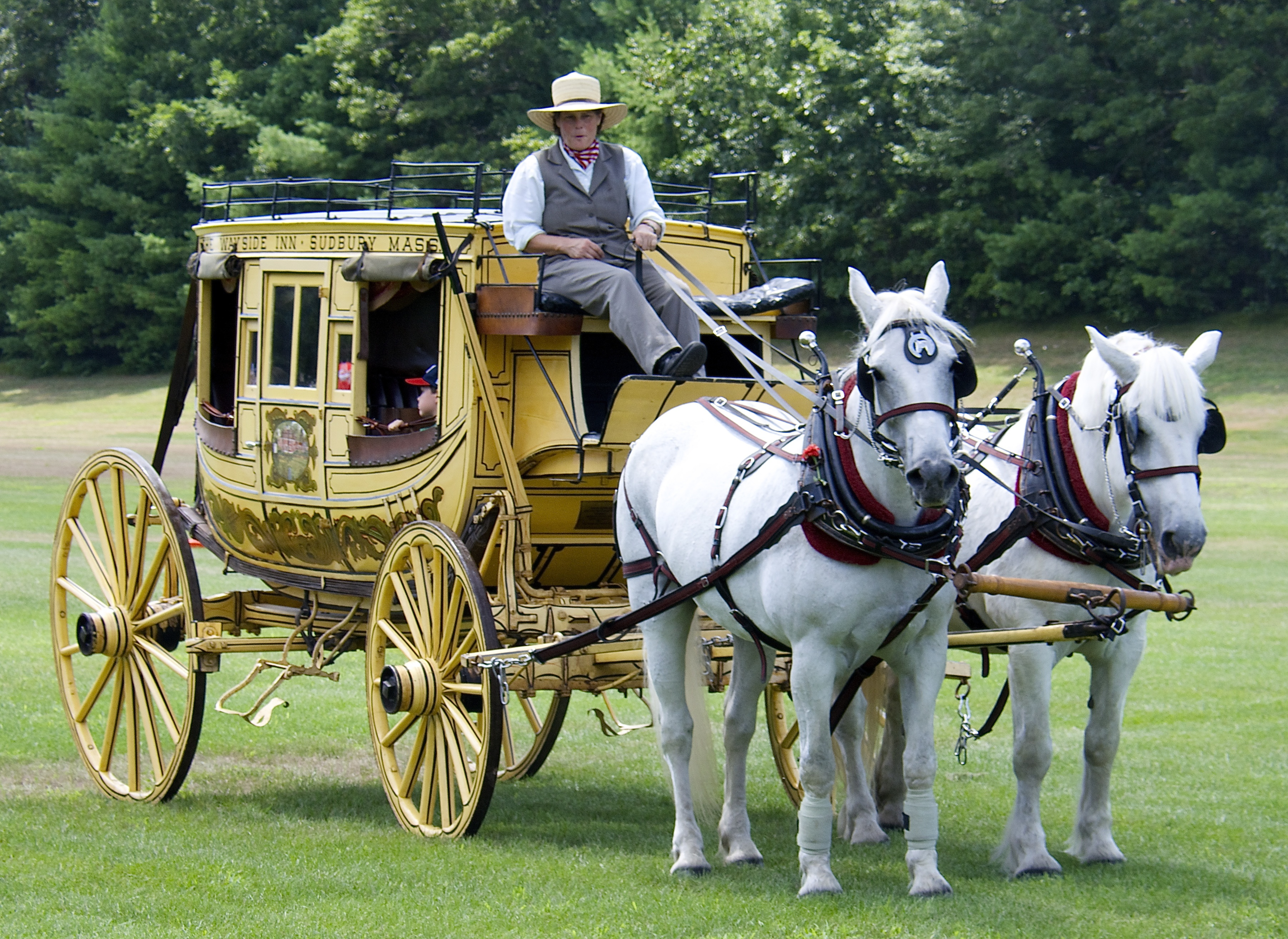
Reenactment, this 1867 coach seats 12 passengers

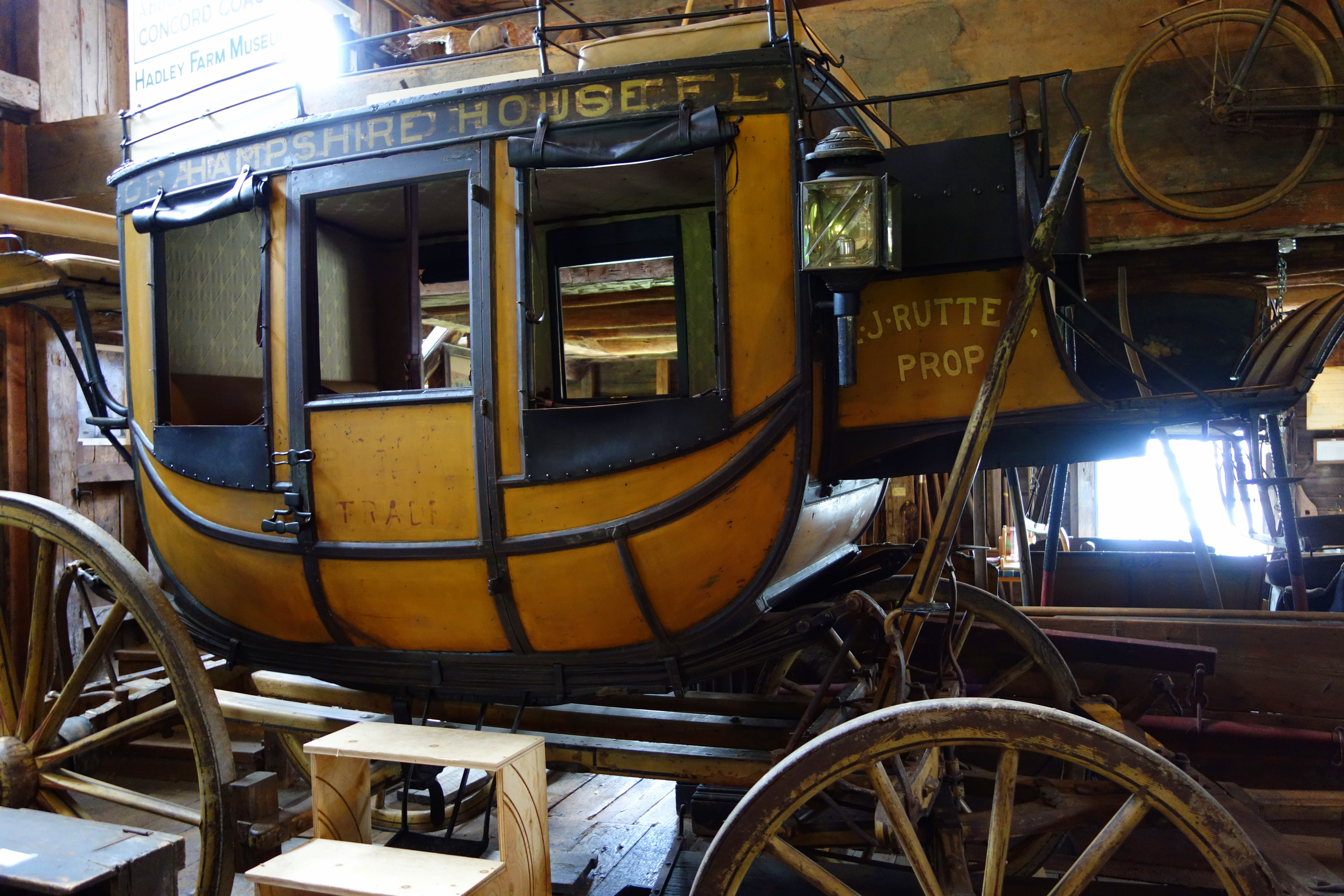
Hadley Farm Museum

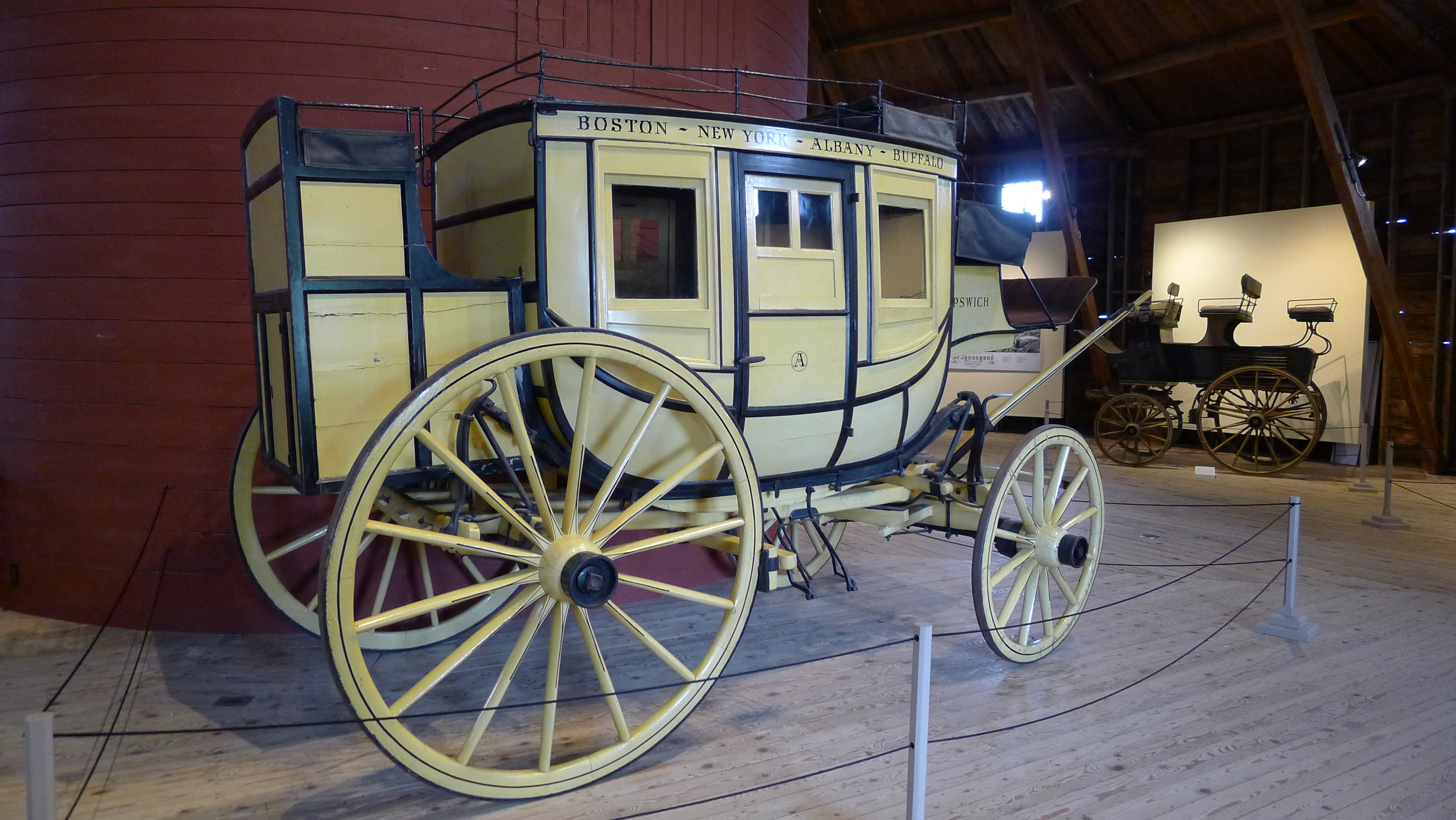
1852, Shelburne Museum

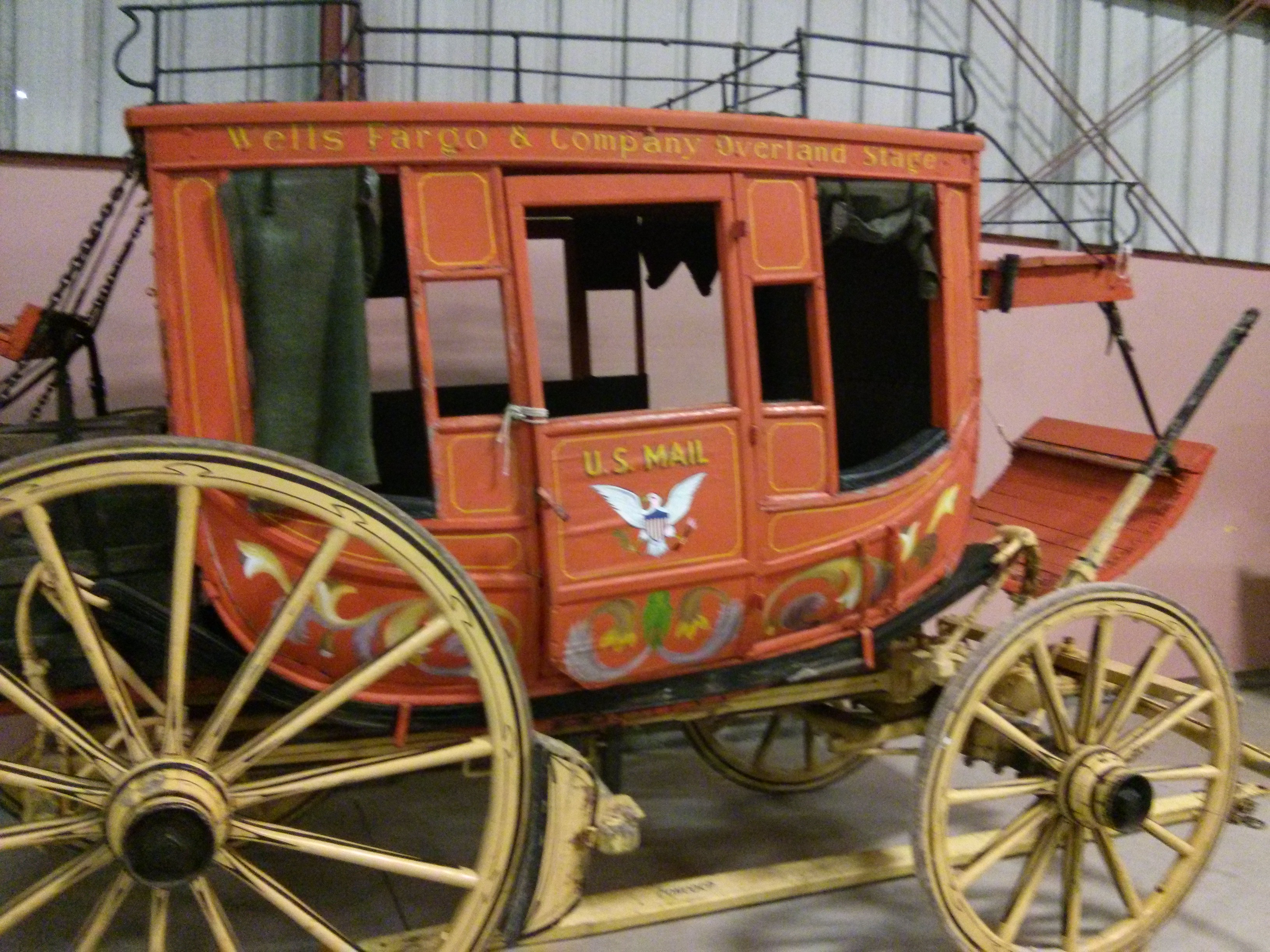
Circus World Museum

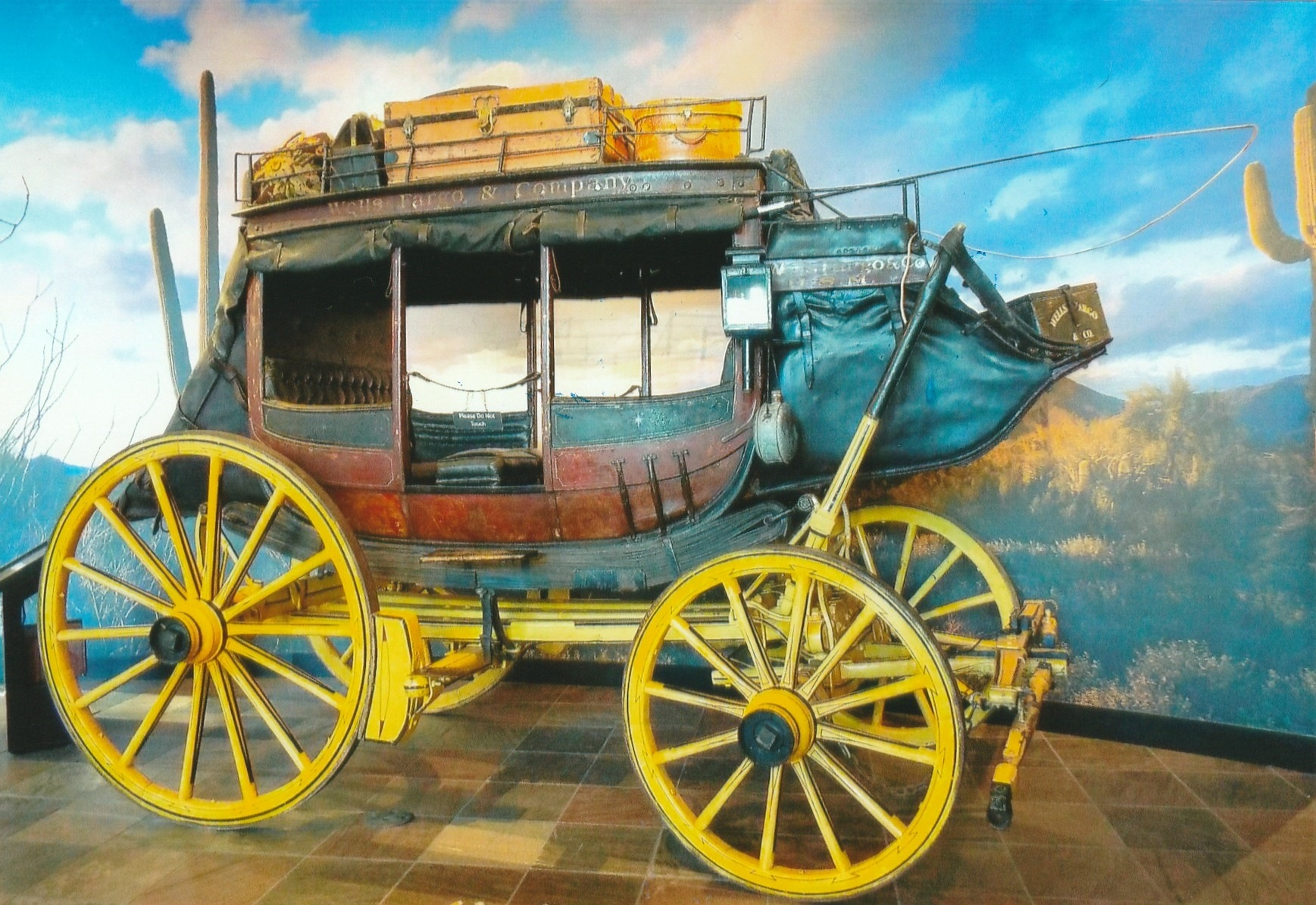
1860, Wells Fargo Museum (Phoenix)

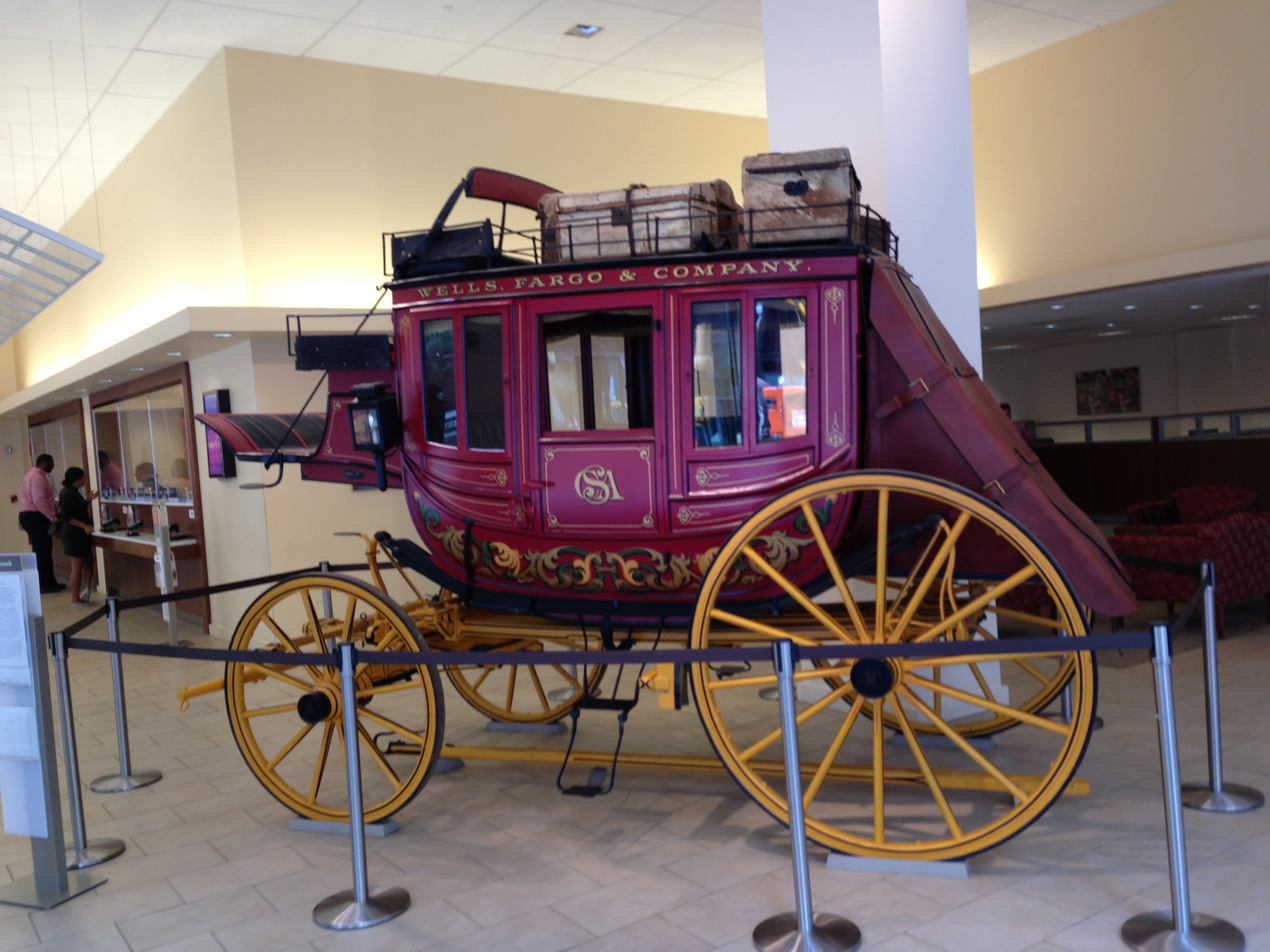
Wells Fargo bank in New York

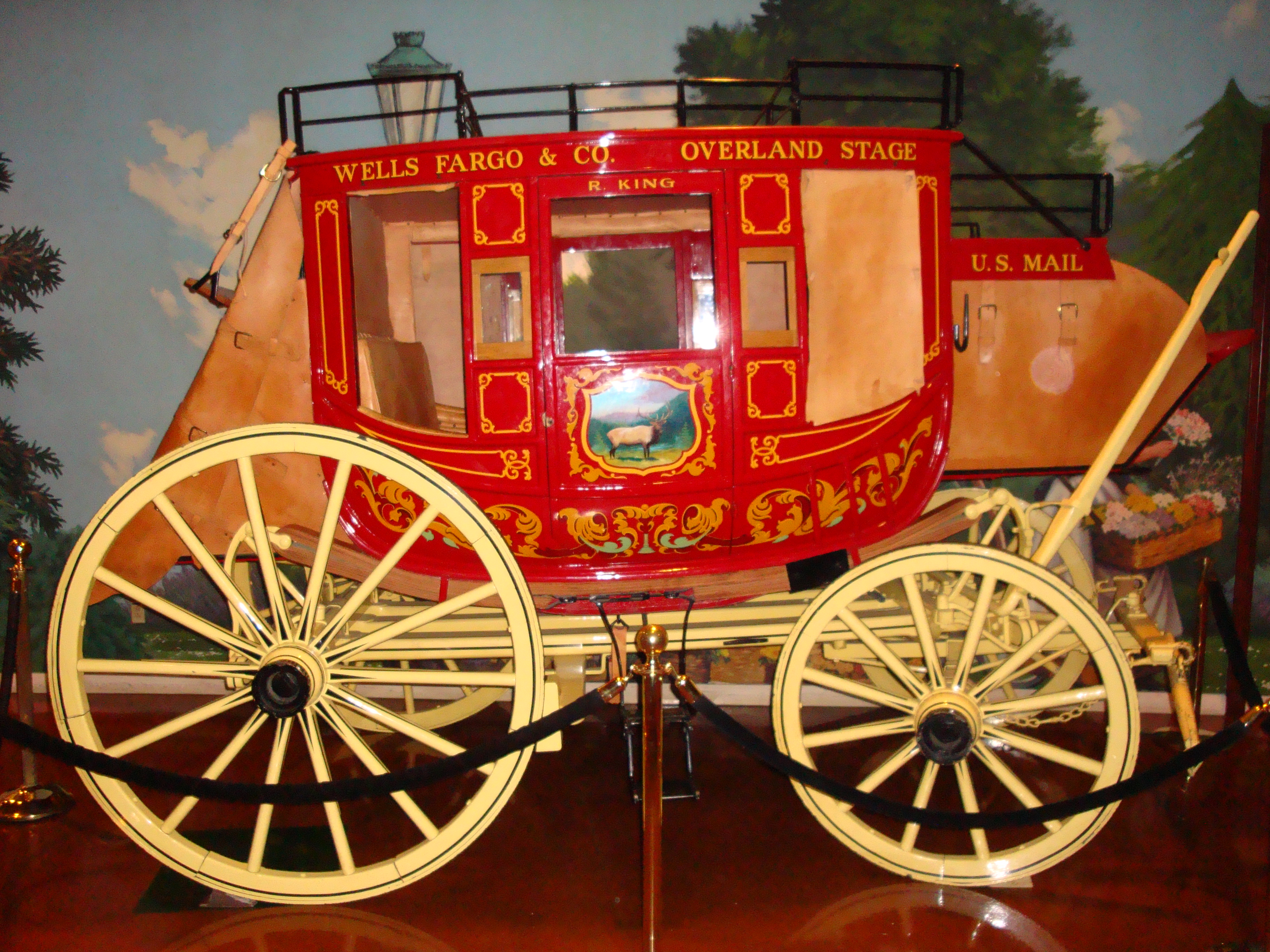
Silver Legacy Resort & Casino
