= Stage wagon =

Light horse-drawn public passenger vehicle

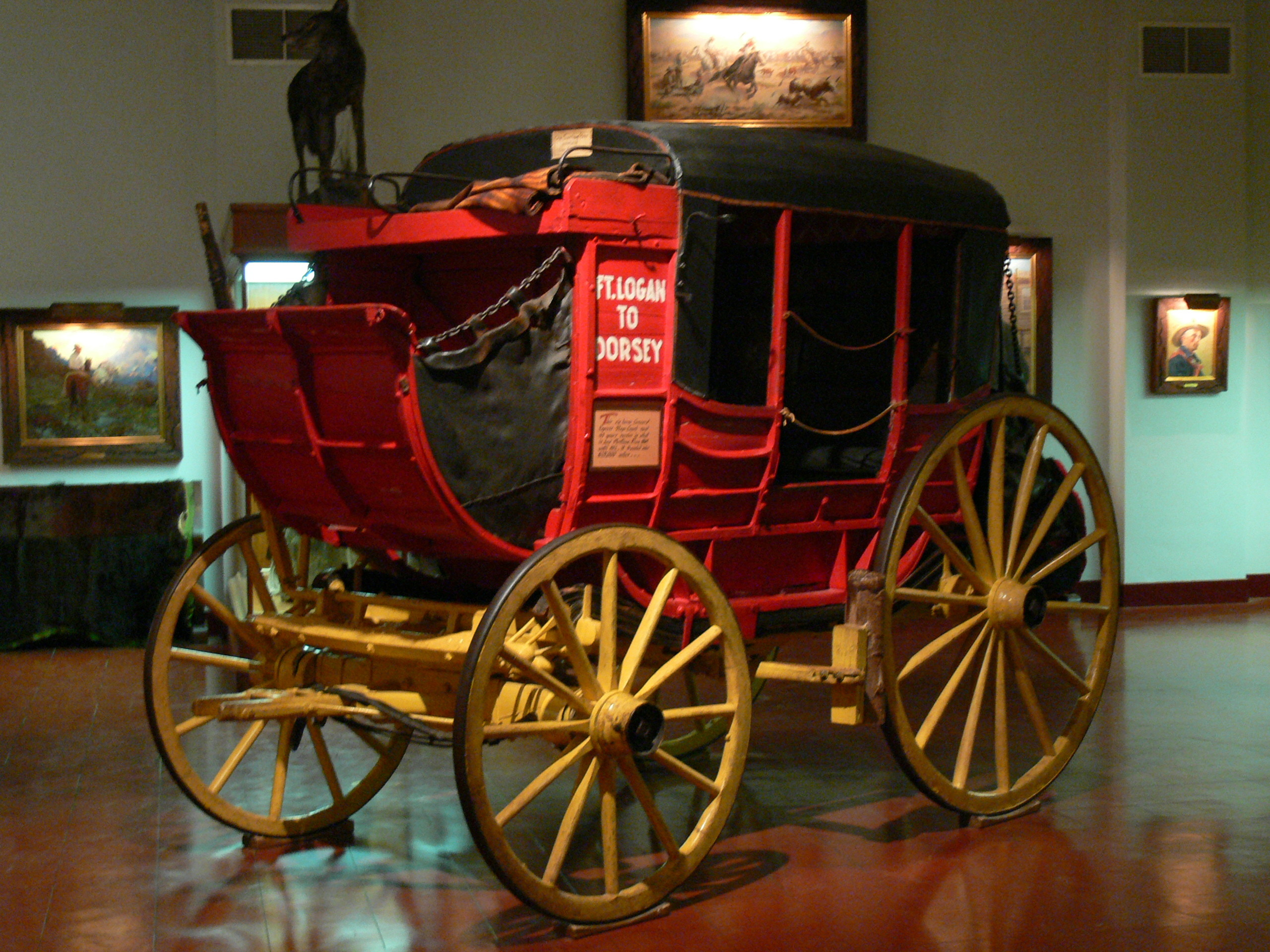
An Overland wagon

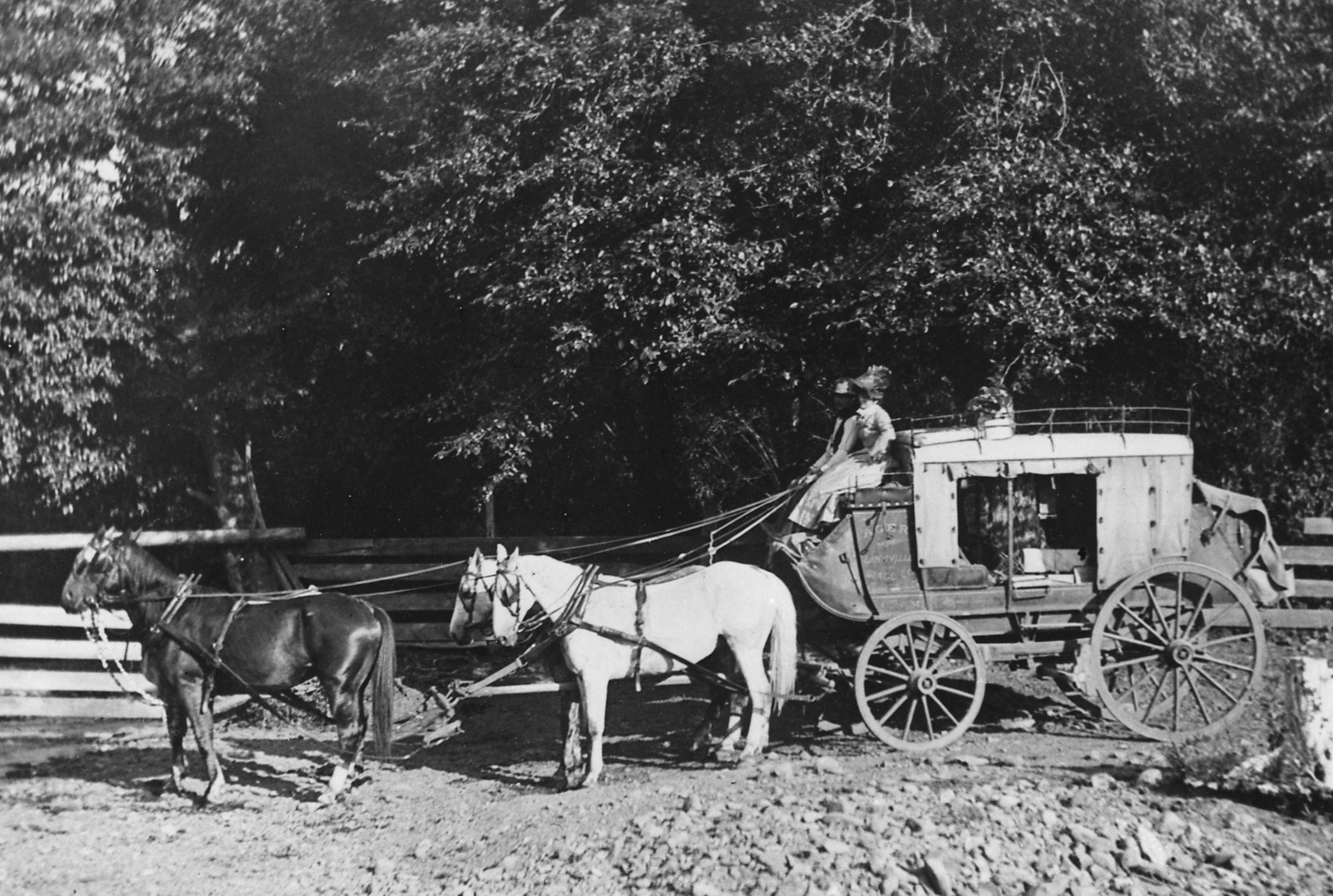
A mud-wagon

Stage wagons, also called passenger wagons or mud wagons, were horse-drawn public passenger vehicles used on early stage lines, and were predecessors of the larger and more comfortable stagecoach. Designed for rough or muddy terrain, they were lighter and more rugged than stagecoaches and were commonly used where poor roads or low passenger demand did not justify operating a full-sized coach. In the early American West, a U.S. Mail contract was considered the "life-blood of the staging industry", providing the revenue needed to sustain stage lines. Many western routes began with stage wagons, and operators often continued using them even after the more expensive stagecoaches became available.

== Design and variations ==
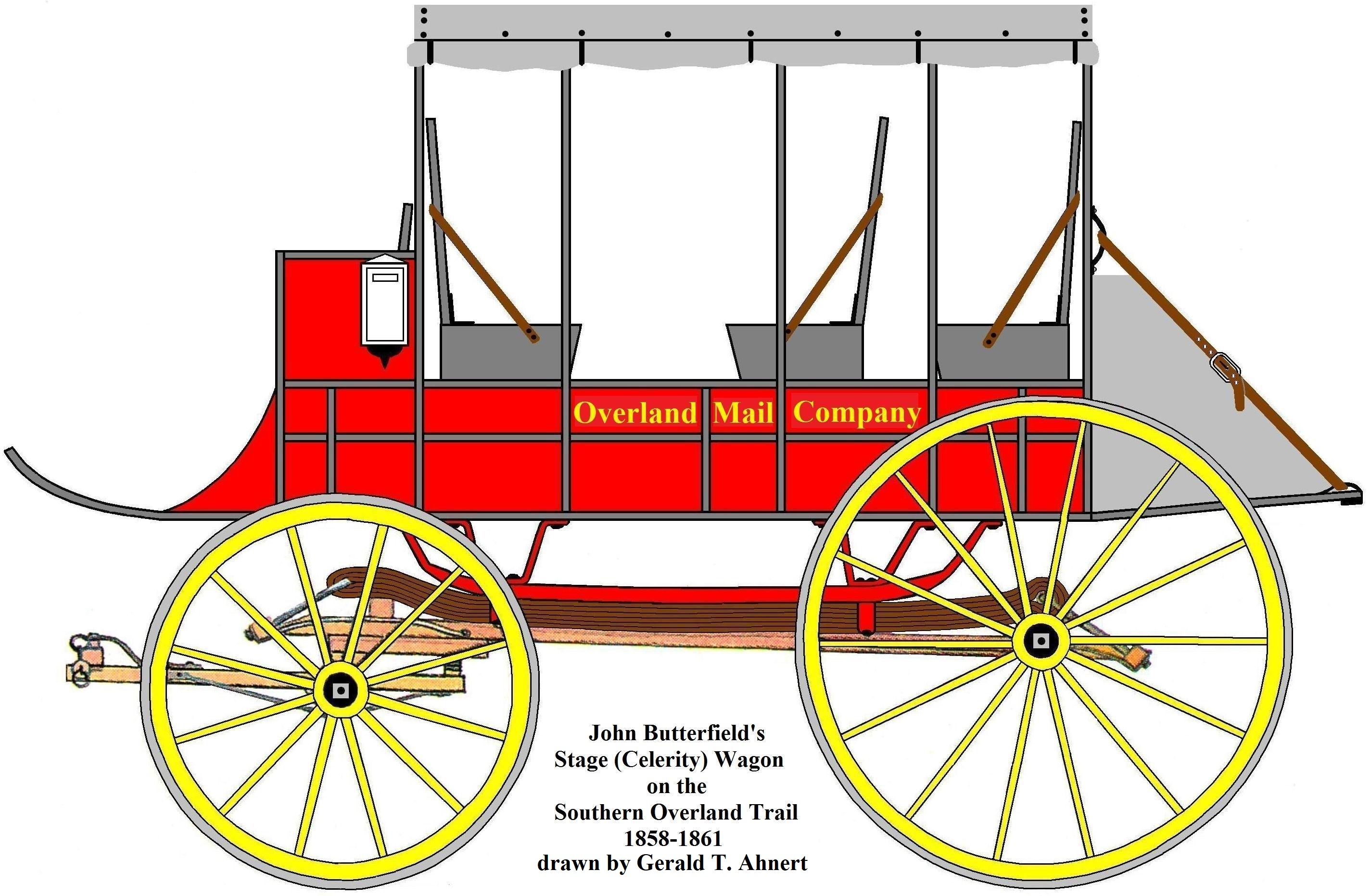
This drawing illustrates the typical suspension method of a stage wagon

The early English freight wagon style of stage wagon had double shafts for wheelers, well-dished wheels with wide treads, and a canvas top over bows. They were very heavy and difficult to overturn, unsprung, lumbering, and driven at a walk. The later American stage wagon had thoroughbraces, sprung seats, a canvas top on pillars, and a luggage compartment on the back.

Passenger wagons had several crosswise bench seats inside; in America seats were sometimes mounted on springs. Different designs accommodated from 4 to 12 passengers. Early models had the driver's seat inside with the passengers, and passengers had to climb over the driver's seat to get inside. Later models had door openings, but no doors, and the driver's seat was moved outside the main compartment. American stage wagons had 6-8 permanent pillars and a flat canvas top or a permanent solid top. The sides were open; some models had roll-down curtains for inclement weather. The wagon was designed as a box on curved sills. Early models were unsprung, but later a low thoroughbrace suspension was added, attached lower than the high thoroughbrace arcs seen on the later Concord coaches.

Some models were named "Overland", many of which were built by Abbot-Downing Company.

The Celerity wagon was created for Butterfield Overland Mail.

The term mud wagon was used for vehicles similar to the Concord coach but of inferior class, lighter, smaller, and with minimal weather protection for passengers.

Examples of stage wagons

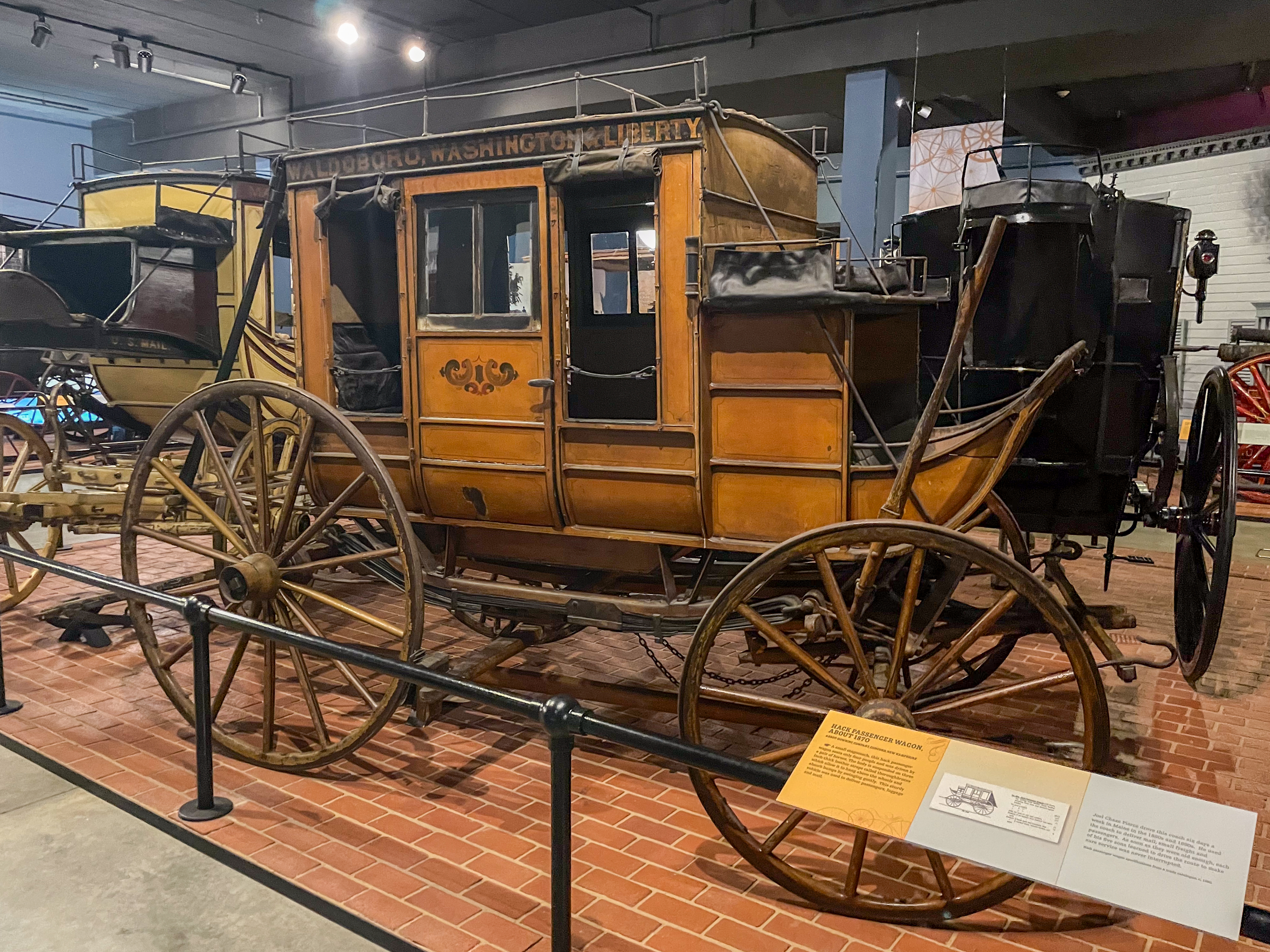
1870 passenger wagon, Abbot-Downing Company

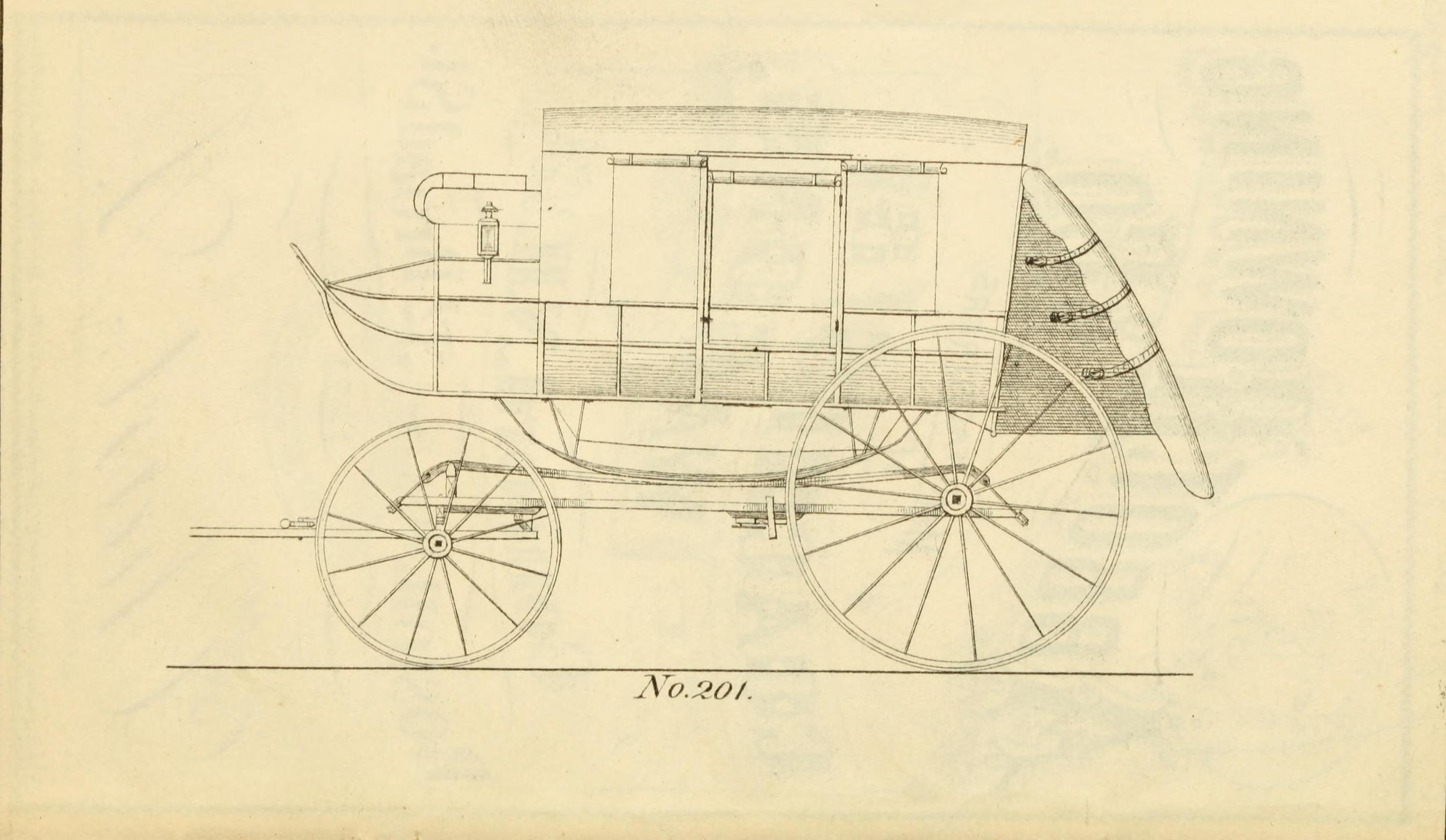
Abbot, Downing's Overland Wagon
a canvas-topped stage wagon 1871 (Note: available in two sizes, 6 or 9 passengers and available with: doors, painted sail duck top, sail duck or enameled curtains, lined in leather, back boot, driver's apron. Abbot, Downing & Co. catalog 1871)

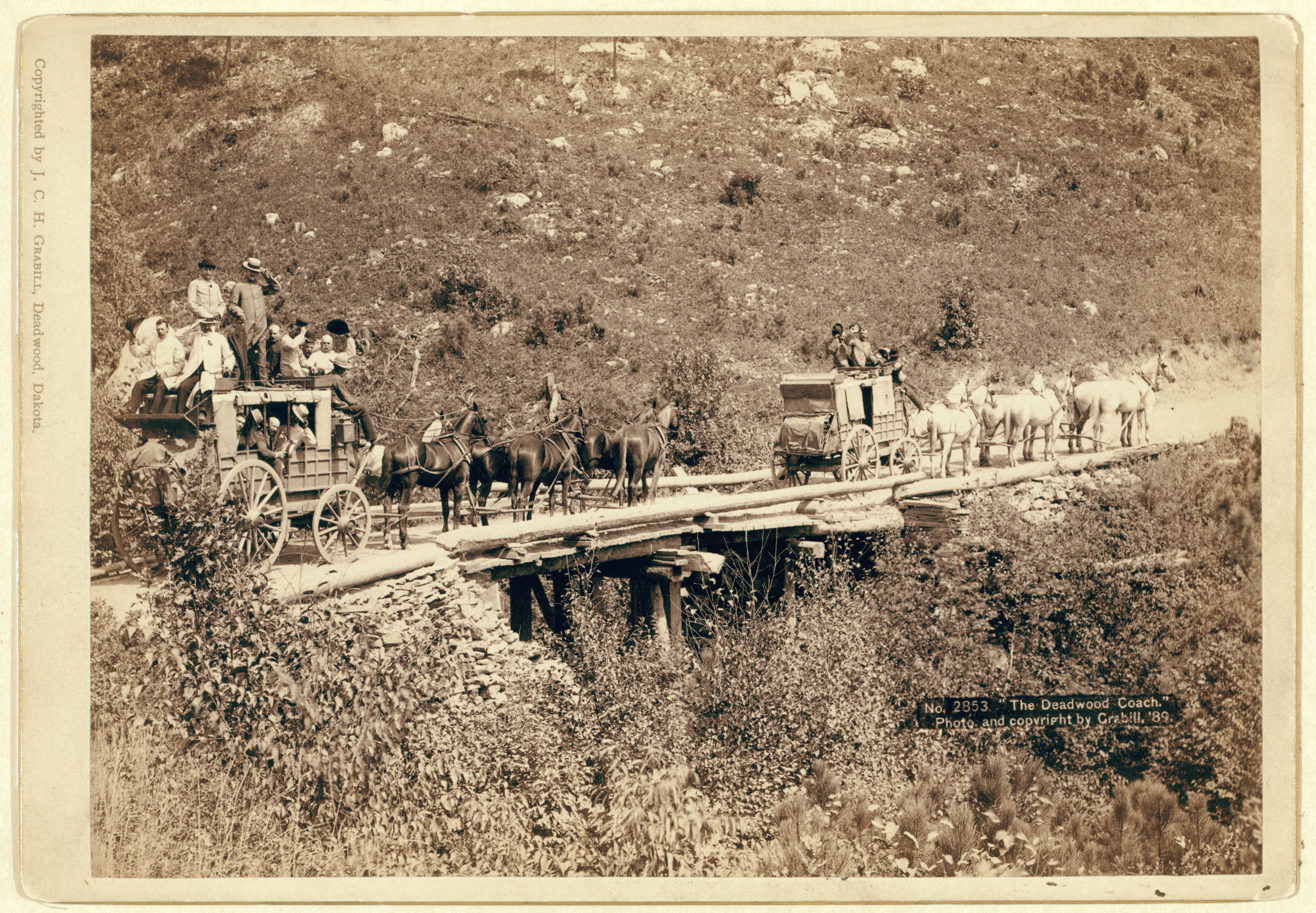
Two large Overland stage wagons on the road to Pierre, South Dakota in 1889.

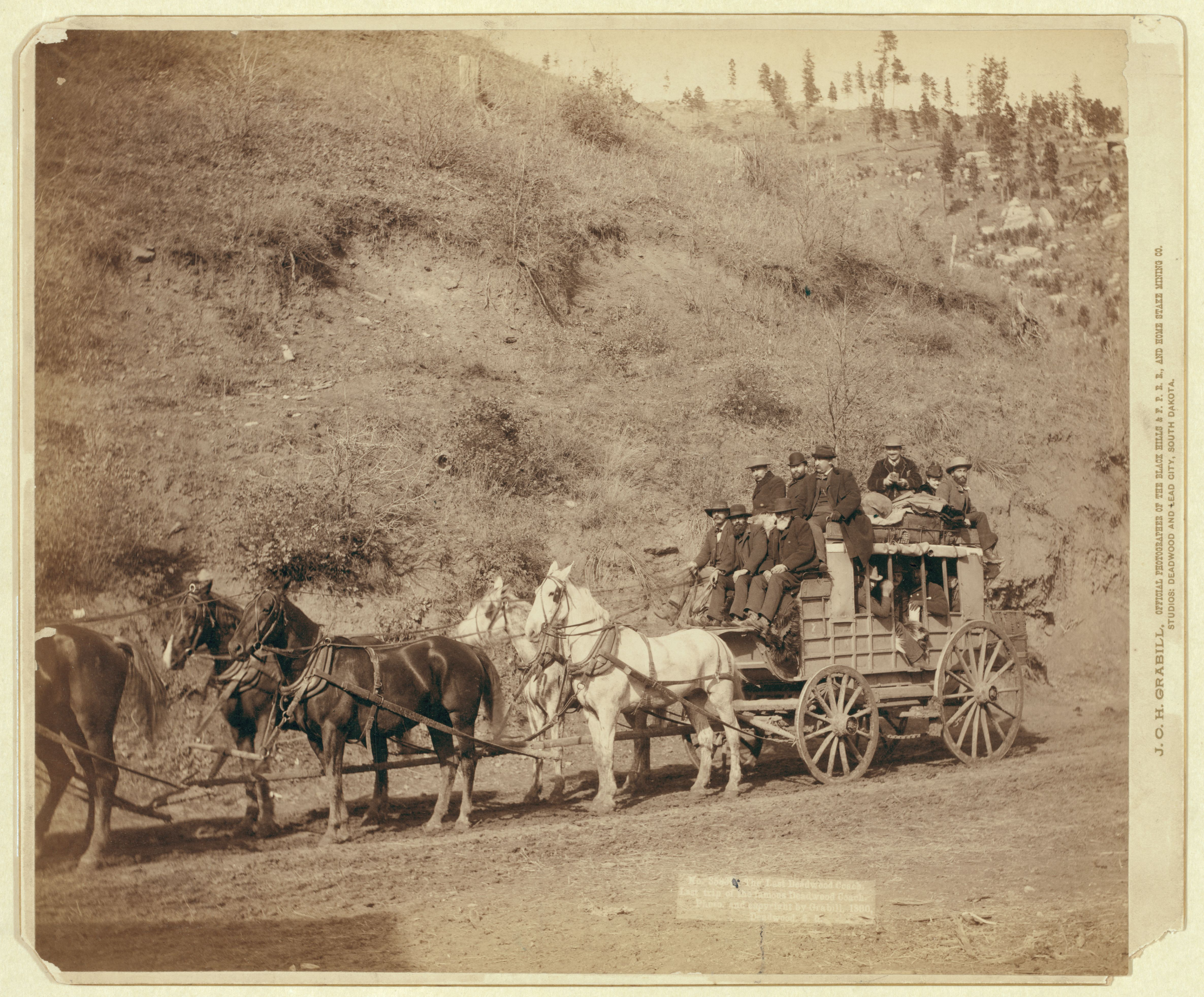
December 28, 1890. The last Deadwood stage

== Historical context ==
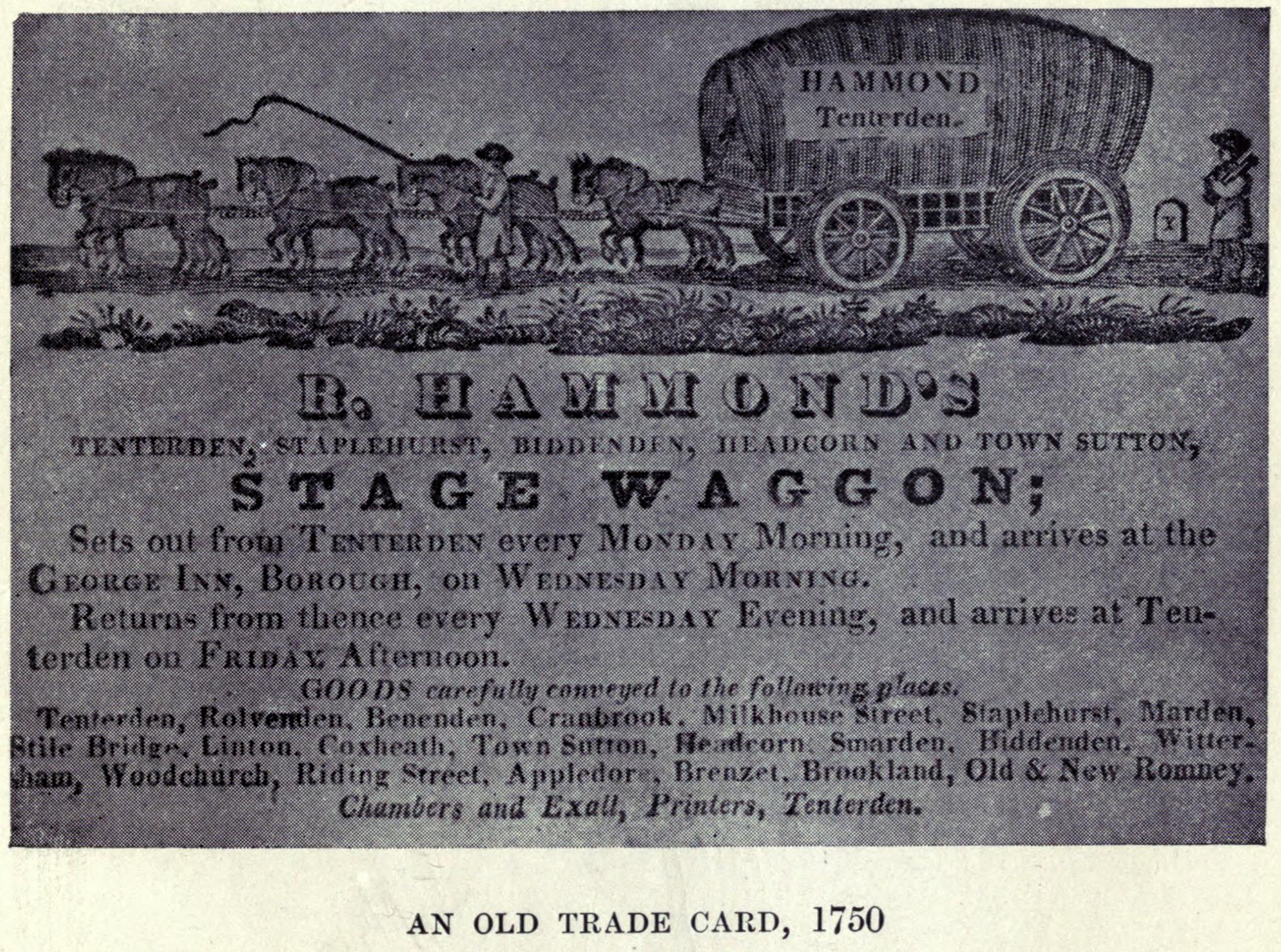
Trade card of R Hammond of Tenterden, 1750. Freight 65 miles (105 km) to Southwark at the south end of London Bridge from Tenterden in the Kentish Weald and return, once each week

Wagons carrying freight had been taking passengers in Europe since 1500. This particular stage wagon type was first recorded near the end of the 18th century in use in eastern North America, US and Upper and Lower Canada. It was an unsprung wagon with the driver's bench seat providing room for two more passengers beside him. It might also carry more passenger seats on the tray behind. These extra seats were reached by climbing over the driver's seat. About this time, the Postmaster General Joseph Habersham required the driver's seat to be moved from the tray onto a front wall to improve the driver's vision and by dropping the tray improve the wagon's stability. This created the characteristic stagecoach-like profile of the stage wagon.

Their relatively simple design and construction allowed them to be sold by Abbot, Downing at around half the price of full-size Concord coaches. Their suspension employed thoroughbraces that were much shorter than those used on Concord stagecoaches.

== Manufacturers ==
Some of the known manufacturers of stage wagons include:

- Abbot, Downing, Concord, New Hampshire
- Milton P Henderson of Stockton California made stage wagons of the same style as Abbot, Downing. The firm began in 1869 as a partnership with E G Clark. They can be identified by the finish of the sides of the bodies and the method of attachment of iron stays back and front.
- P O LeMay and Livy Swan at Yreka, California
- Weisenhorn Carriage in Helena, Montana built a vehicle very like an Abbot, Downing Australian wagon
- Celerity was a brand of Stage wagon made in Troy, New York.

== See also ==
- Stagecoach
- Concord coach
