= Abbot-Downing Company =

US coach and carriage builder

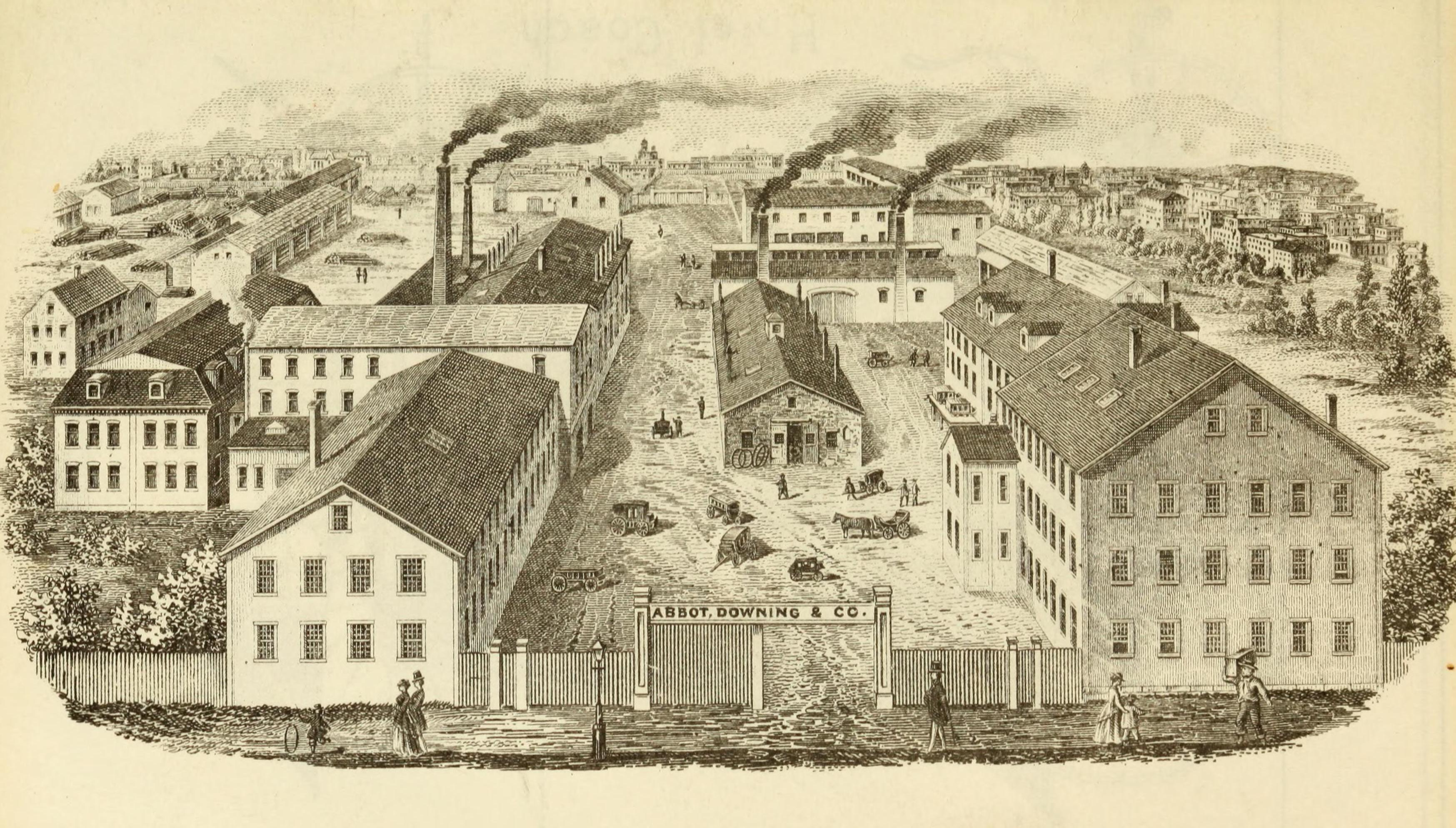
Abbot, Downing factory, Concord circa 1870

Abbot-Downing Company was a coach and carriage builder in Concord, New Hampshire, which became known throughout the United States for its products — in particular the Concord coach.

The business's roots went back to 1813, and it persisted in some form into the 1930s with the manufacture of motorized trucks and fire engines. The company name was sold to Wells Fargo.

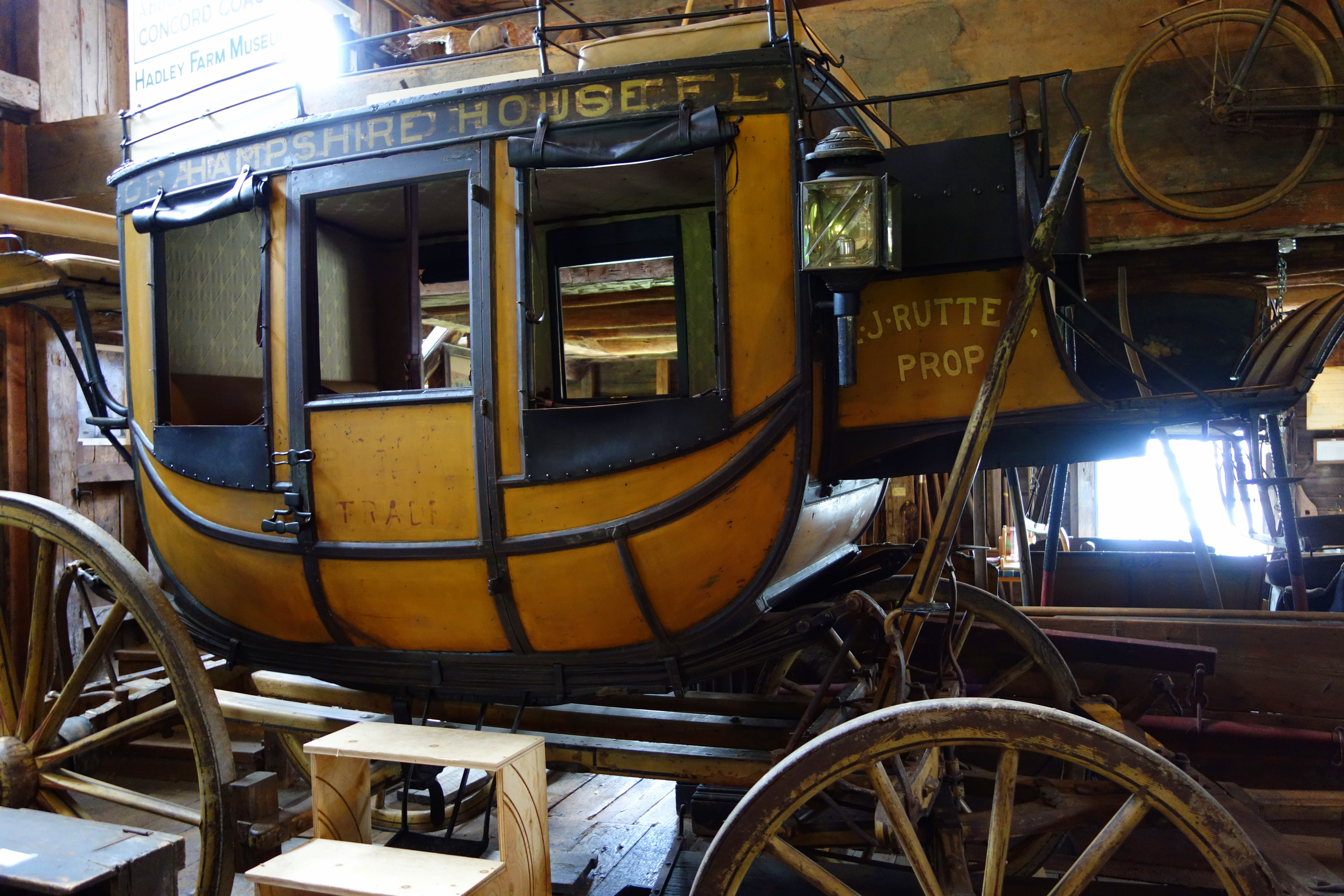
Concord coach by Abbot and Downing

== Abbot and Downing ==
The business was founded in Concord in 1813 by wheelwright Lewis Downing (1792–1873) from Lexington, Massachusetts. In 1825, Downing, having decided to make coaches, hired coachbuilder J. Stephen Abbot of Salem, Massachusetts. They formed a partnership that lasted from 1828 to 1847. Abbot and his son specialized in bodies, Downing and his sons in the running gear.

== The Concord coach ==
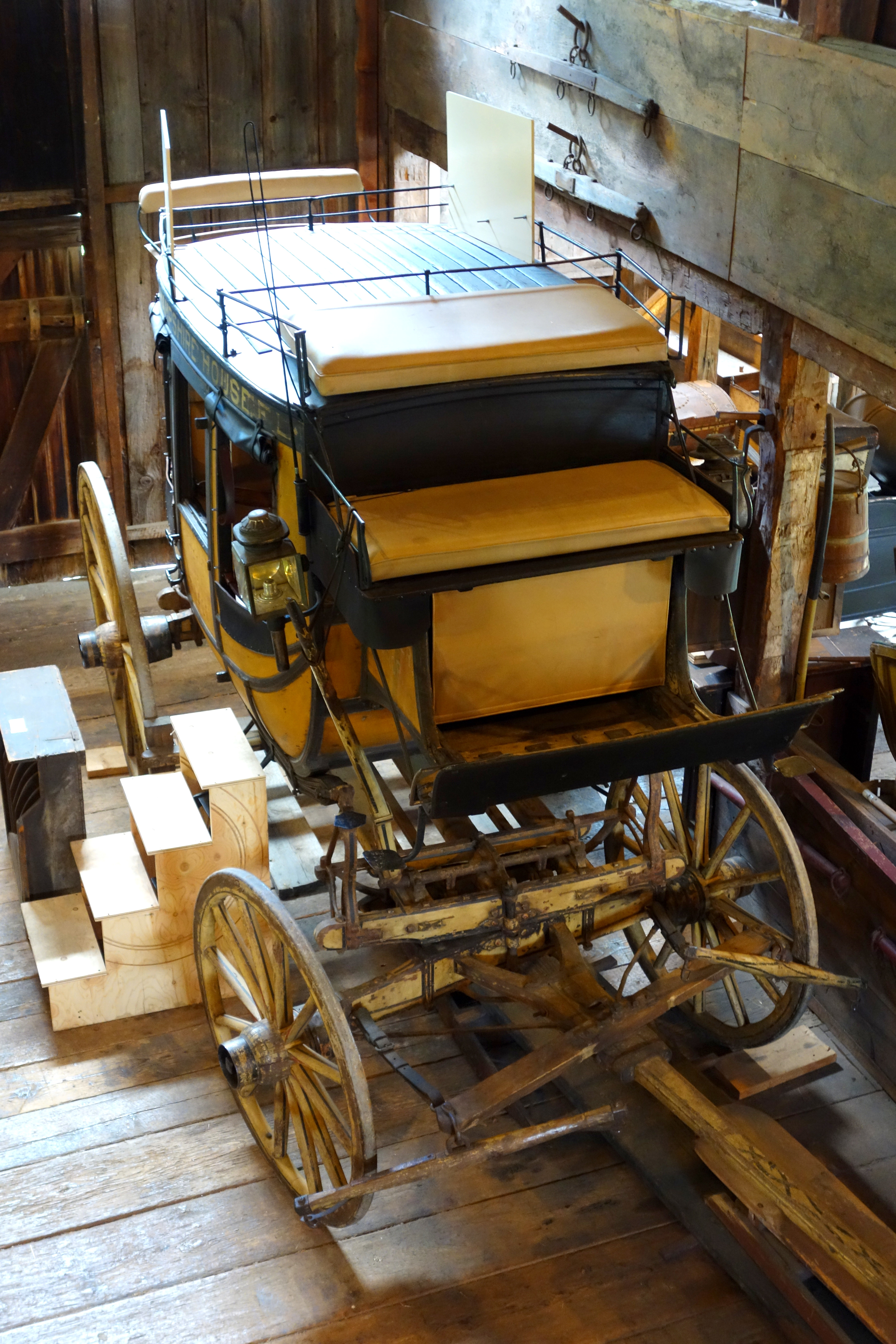

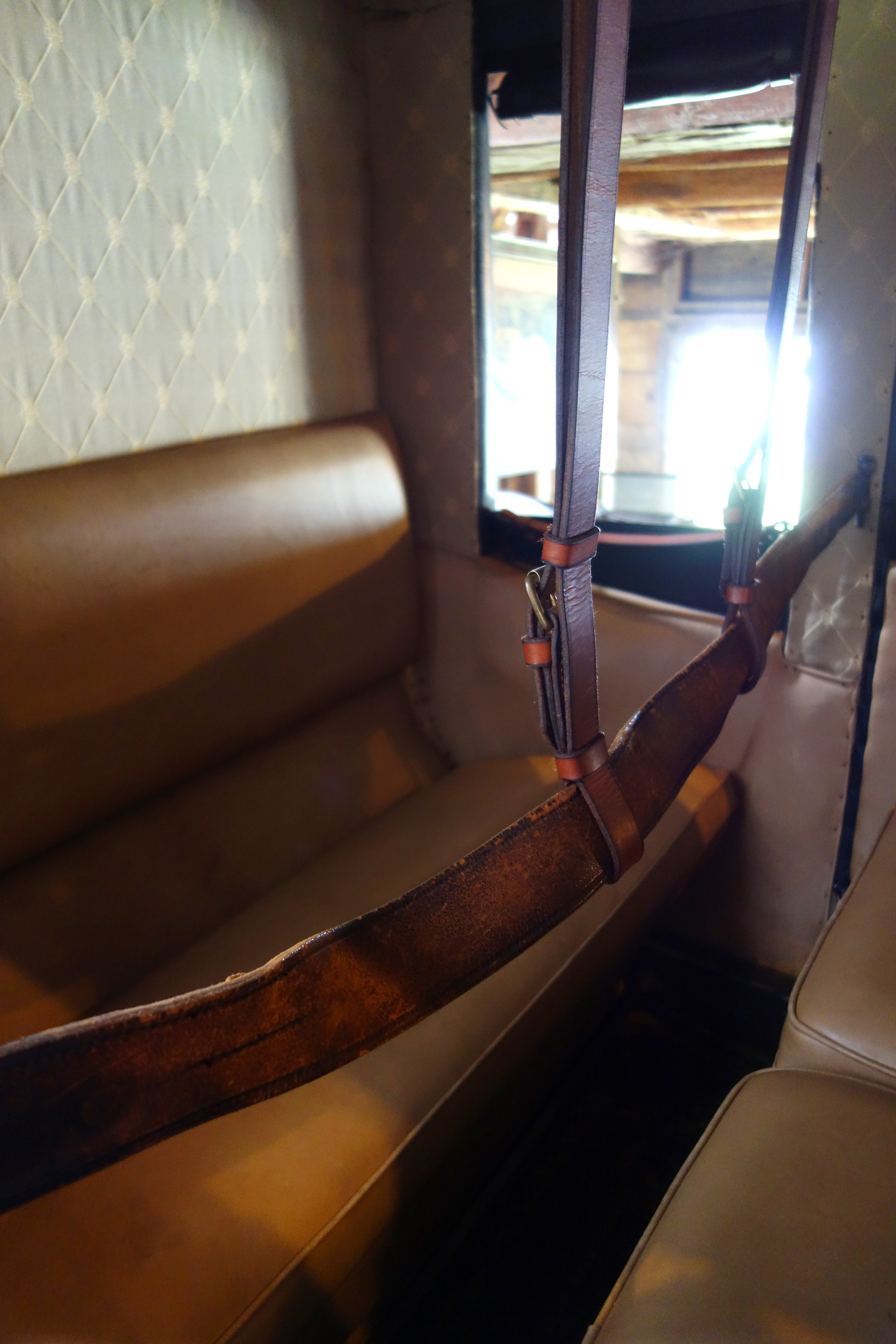
Abbot and Downing Concord coach in Hadley Farm Museum, Hadley, Massachusetts

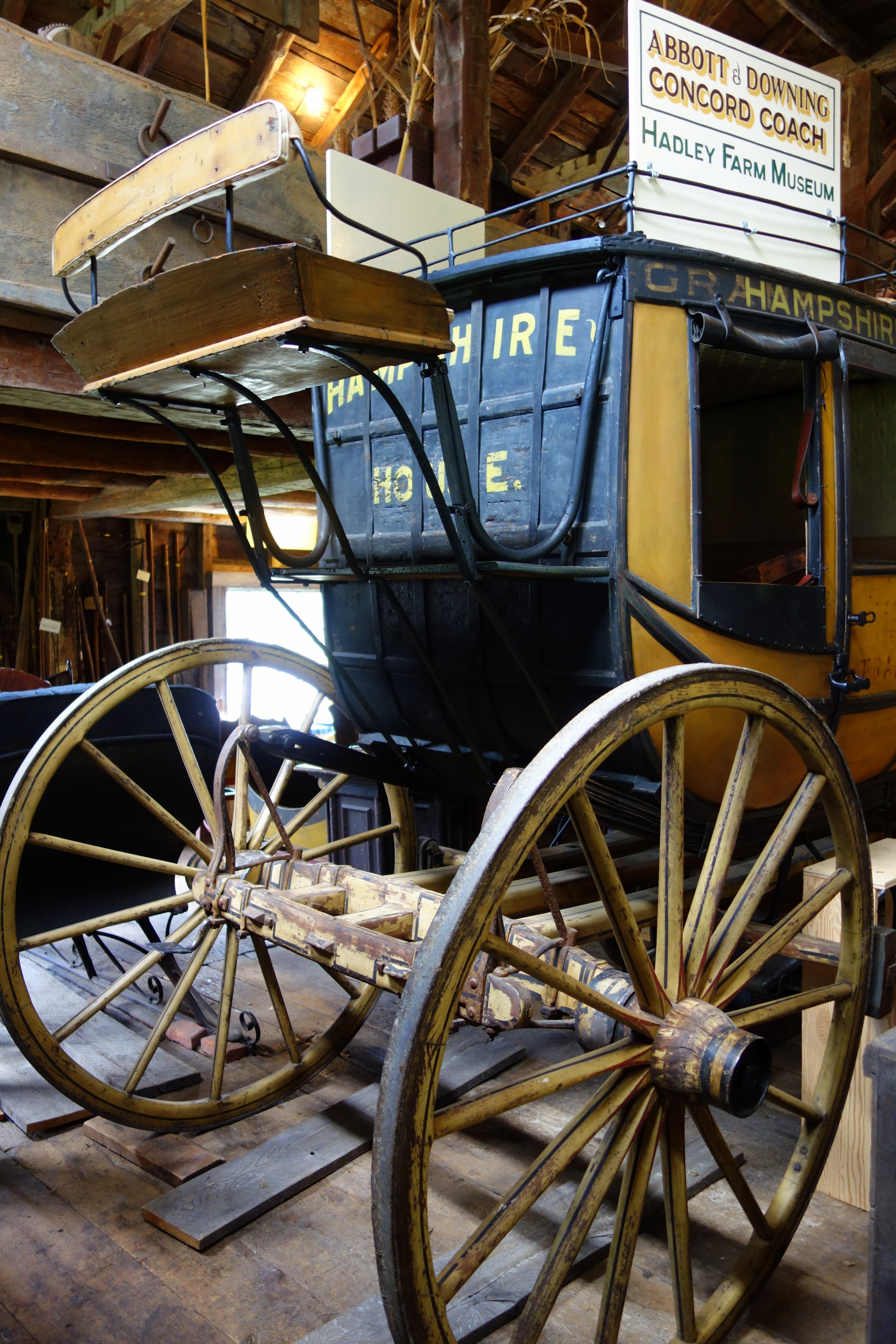

== Lewis Downing and Sons ==
In 1847, Downing went into direct competition with his former partner, taking his two sons into a new partnership known as Lewis Downing and Sons.

== Abbot-Downing Company ==
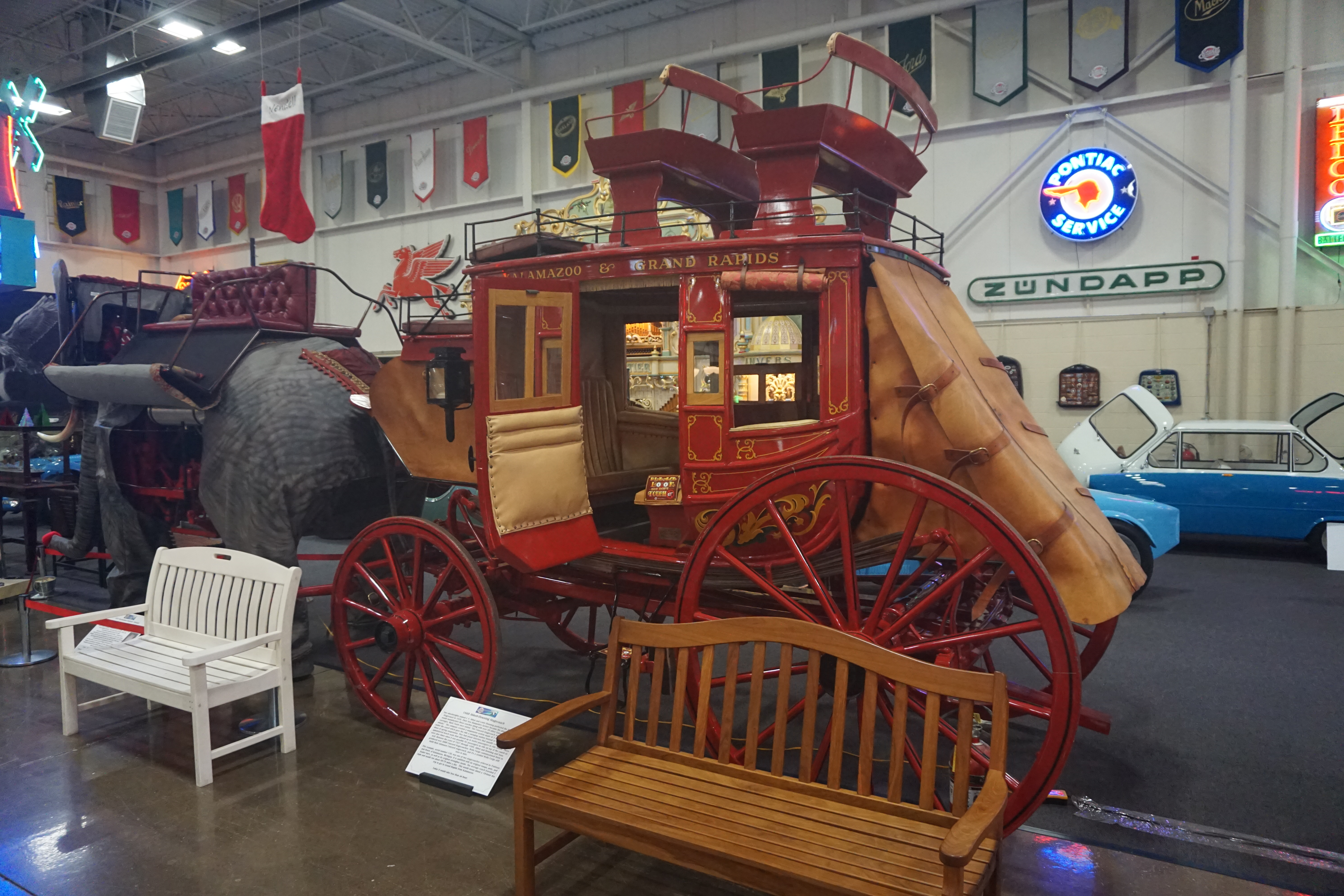
1860 Abbot-Downing stagecoach at Stahls Automotive Collection

Abbot continued building vehicles under the name Abbot-Downing Company of Concord, New Hampshire.

Lewis Downing retired in 1865, and his two sons joined in partnership with Abbot. Lewis Downing Jr. assumed leadership of the new partnership.

== Abbot, Downing & Company ==
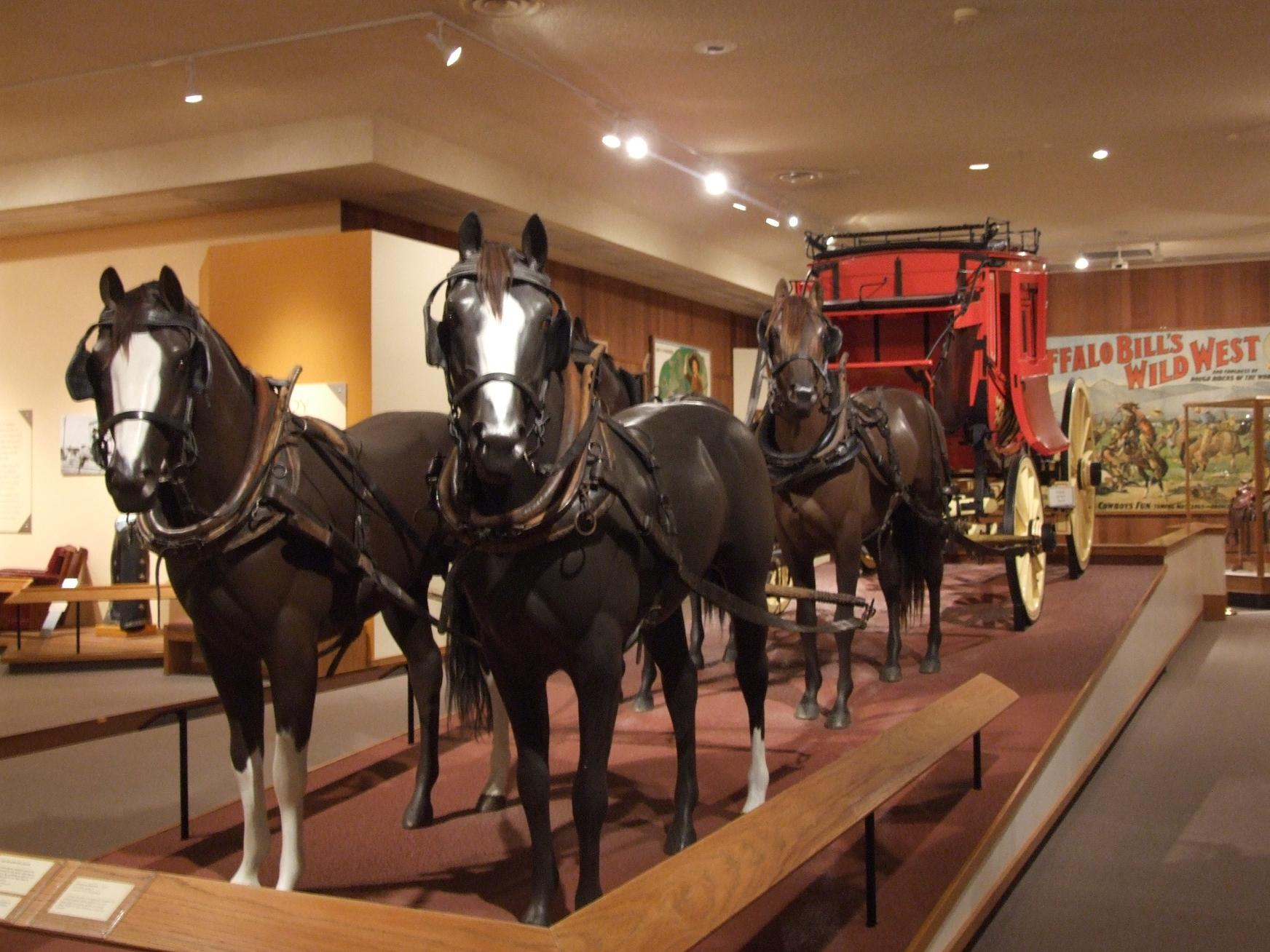
Buffalo Bill's Concord by Abbot-Downing

Advertisement for Abbot, Downing & Company in Neville's Macon directory and advertiser for 1869-70

Abbot-Downing made coaches and large passenger vehicles of all kinds, including horse-drawn streetcars. They made all kinds of wagons, including ambulances and gun carriages during the Civil War. Incorporated in 1873, they kept offices in New York and in Boston at 388 Atlantic Avenue. By 1900, the period of great prosperity was over. They had opened shops in New York and Vermont and established an agency in Australia but — instead of taking to mass production like most industries — Abbot, Downing stuck with custom orders and handwork.

After the death of Lewis Downing Jr. in 1901, ownership of the company assets passed to Samuel C. Eastman. The society sold the assets to a Concord banker who kept them but sold the name Abbot Downing to the Wells Fargo Company.

== Special customers ==
- Wells Fargo and their contractors. "At one point in 1868, for example, a train left the factory site with thirty Concord Coaches built for the Wells Fargo Company in Omaha, Nebraska."

== Abbot-Downing Truck and Body Company ==
Some local investors resurrected Abbot, Downing's activities in 1912, adding motorized trucks and fire engines to the new catalogue. It was dissolved in 1925.

== International ==
=== Australia ===
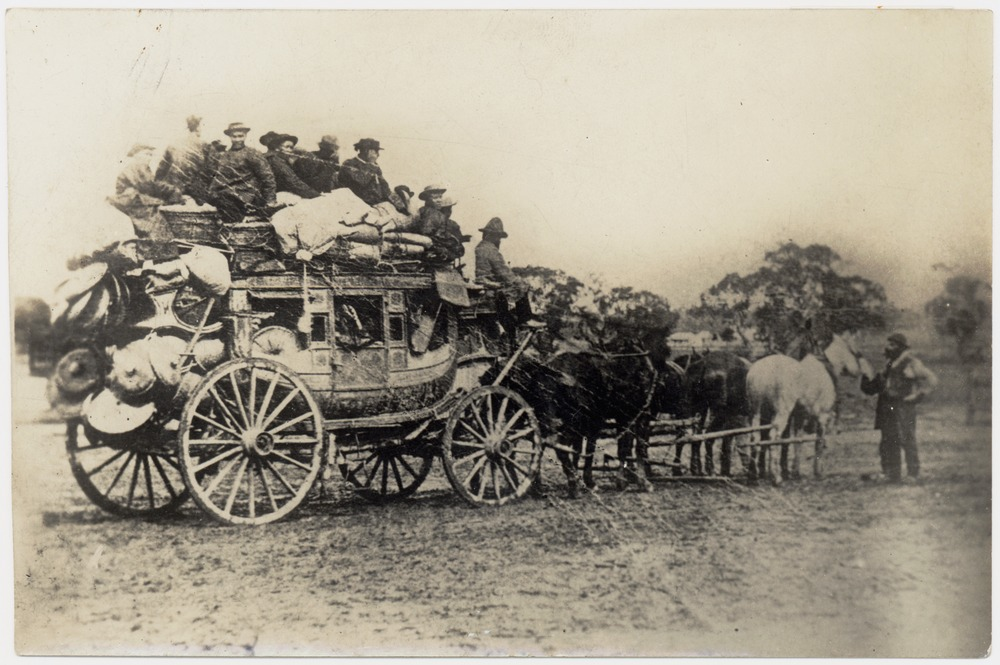
Concord coach, Castlemaine, Victoria, Australia

Freeman Cobb (1830–1878), born in Brewster, Massachusetts, joined express agents Adams & Co in 1849. In 1853, he was sent to Melbourne, Australia, with George Mowton, a senior employee, to establish a branch.

Cobb had taken over to Australia two Concord thoroughbrace wagons for Adams & Co, and in July 1853 they began a carrying service from Melbourne to its port. The carrying venture was unsuccessful largely because of very bad weather and, like Wells Fargo, Adams & Co withdrew from Australia. A railway on the same route was opened in September 1854.

Neither Adams & Co nor Wells Fargo had become properly set up in Australia. However, their former employees remained in Australia and formed a partnership, Cobb & Co. Their average age was 22.

On January 30, 1854, the new firm, having mounted seats in the former Adams & Co Concord wagons, started a stagecoach service running the 100 miles (160 km) or so between Bendigo and Melbourne through Castlemaine, then named Forest Creek. This service proved very profitable. 1856 was the year of Victoria's greatest gold yield. The following advertisement appeared in Melbourne's Argus in October 1857: "For Sale: Lord & Co., No. 30 King Street, (Melbourne) have on SALE: Coaches. 3 superb concord stage coaches, with seats for 25 passengers." At the end of 1857, the first of these Concord coaches was put into service by Cobb & Co carrying 21 passengers (it later carried 30 passengers), and the other two coaches soon joined it.

Francis Boardman Clapp (1833–1920), American founder of the Melbourne Tramway & Omnibus Company and an early partner in Cobb & Co, advertised himself from 1867 as "Victoria's Sole Agent for Abbott, Downing & Company's Coaches, Carriages and Buggies". His office and showroom was at 65 Little Collins Street, Melbourne.

==== Local manufacture ====
In 1862, Cobb & Co left Melbourne and established headquarters in Bathurst, New South Wales, including new coach and harness factories which built them coaches "in the manner of" Abbot & Downing. Most Australian-made coaches were 12 and 25 passenger vehicles. A coach for 60 passengers was built at Bathurst but proved a failure. Other coachbuilding factories were established at Goulburn, Bourke, Castlemaine, Brisbane and Charleville.

=== Chile ===
In 1855, Adams & Co ran daily express Concord coaches from Valparaíso to Santiago.

=== South Africa ===
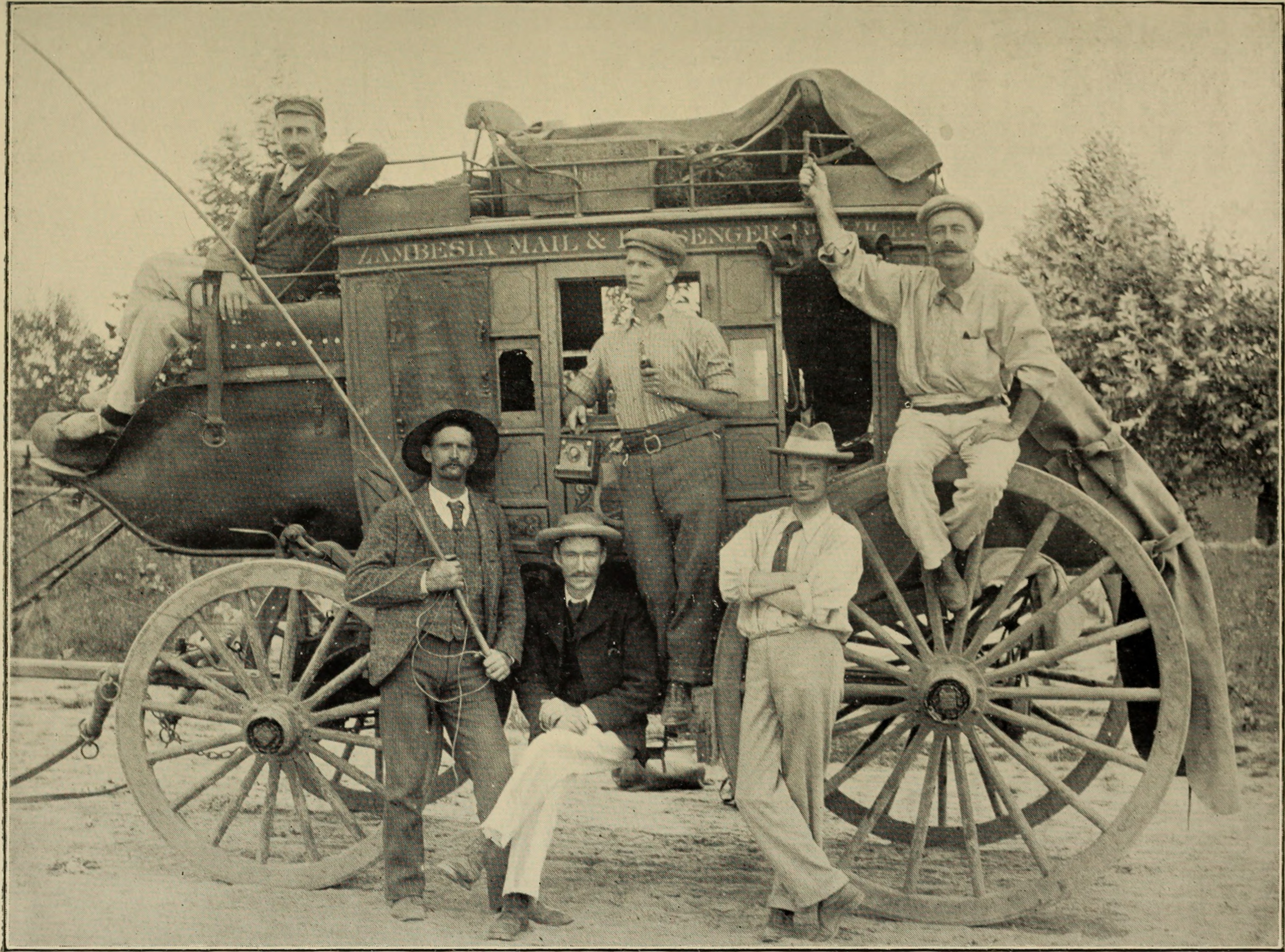
Zambesia Mail and Passenger Service, inauguration of route Salisbury to Umtali

Freeman Cobb lost money in banking investments and returned to Adams & Co to manage their Boston agency. In 1871, he took his family and settled in Port Elizabeth, South Africa where he operated a coach service to the diamond fields at Kimberley under the name Cobb & Co. His health failed and his profitable business suffered and became insolvent in 1878 a few months before he died in Port Elizabeth. His family returned to Brewster.

=== Rhodesia ===
"In the early years of Southern Rhodesia the only method of travelling was by great lumbering coaches similar to those formerly in use in America. They were large and roomy vehicles capable of holding twelve passengers inside and two outside besides the two drivers. They were drawn by ten mules and carried besides the twenty-five pounds of luggage allowed to each traveller all the Government parcels and mails." . . . "the coach never stopping day or night except at stations every twelve miles or so where the mules were changed or at a wayside store where half an hour was allowed for a hasty meal." Percy F Hone.

== See also ==
- New Hampshire Historical Marker No. 128: The Concord Coach
