= Barne =

Barne is a surname. Notable people with the surname include:

- Barne Barne (1754–1828), English landowner and politician
- Frederick Barne (1801–1886), English landowner and politician
- Frederick St John Newdigate Barne (1842–1898), British army officer and politician
- George Barne (bishop) (1879–1954), Jamaican-born English cricketer and Anglican bishop
- George Barne (died 1558), Sheriff of London and Lord Mayor of London
- George Barne (died 1593), Sheriff of London and Lord Mayor of London
- Johan Barne (born 1964), Swedish Olympic sailor
- Kitty Barne (1883–1961), English writer and screenwriter
- Miles Barne (politician born 1718), MP for Dunwich 1747–54 and 1762–77
- Miles Barne (politician born 1746), MP for Dunwich 1791–96
- Michael Barne (politician) (1759–1837), English soldier and politician, MP for Dunwich 1812–30
- Michael Barne (1877–1961), English explorer
- Shrirang Barne (born 1964), Indian politician
- Snowdon Barne (1756–1825), English barrister and politician
- William Barne (died 1562), English politician
- William Barne (died 1619), English landowner and politician

== See also ==
- Barne Barton, area of Plymouth, Devon, England
- Barne Inlet, inlet of Antarctica
- Barne Glacier, glacier of Antarctica
- Cape Barne, headland of Antarctica
- Barnes (disambiguation)
