= Barnes =

Barnes may refer to:

== People and fictional characters ==
- Barnes (surname), including a list of people and fictional characters
- Barnes (given name), a list of people

== Places ==
=== United Kingdom ===
- Barnes, London, England
  - Barnes railway station
  - Barnes Bridge railway station
  - Barnes High Street, street in Barnes
  - Barnes Railway Bridge
  - Barnes Hospital, London
  - Municipal Borough of Barnes (1894 to 1965)
  - Barnes (ward)
- Barnes, Sunderland, England
- Barnes Castle, East Lothian, Scotland
- Barnes Hall, Sheffield

=== United States ===
- Barnes, Alabama, an unincorporated community in Dale County, Alabama, United States
- Barnes, Kansas, a city in Washington Township, Kansas, United States
- Barnes, Virginia, an unincorporated community in Greene County, Virginia, United States
- Barnes County, North Dakota
- Barnes Township, North Dakota
- Barnes Creek (Washington), a stream
- Barnes Creek (Wisconsin), a stream
- Barnes Lake (disambiguation)

=== Elsewhere ===
- Barnes, New South Wales, Australia
- Barnes Ice Cap, Baffin Island, Nunavut, Canada
- Barnes, Jalpaiguri, West Bengal, India

== Other uses ==
- Barnes Foundation, an art museum in Philadelphia, Pennsylvania, US
- Barnes Group, a global industrial and aerospace manufacturer
- Barnes Hospital, Cheadle, Greater Manchester, England
- Barnes Municipal Airport, Westfield, Massachusetts, US
- Barnes Opening, an opening in chess
- Barnes Rugby Football Club, a rugby union club in London
- Barnes School, Devlali, India
- USS Barnes, several warships

== See also ==
- Barn
- Barne
