= George Cherry =

George Cherry may refer to:

- George Cherry (cricketer) (1822–1887), English cricketer and barrister
- George Henry Cherry, member of Parliament for Dunwich
- George Frederick Cherry (1761–1799), British-born political officer of the East India Company

== See also ==
- George Kruck Cherrie (1865–1948), American naturalist and explorer
