= Miles Barne =

Miles Barne may refer to:

- Miles Barne (theologian) (fl.), English theologian, Fellow of Peterhouse, Cambridge, member of the Chapel Royal, non-juror after the Glorious Revolution
- Miles Barne (politician born 1718) (1718–1780), MP for Dunwich 1747–54 and 1762–77
- Miles Barne (politician born 1746) (1746–1825), MP for Dunwich 1791–96

== See also ==
- Barne
