= Joshua Vanneck, 2nd Baron Huntingfield =

British peer and Member of Parliament

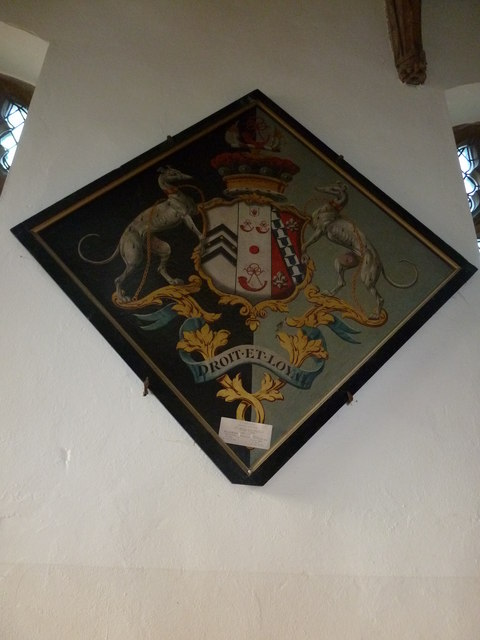
Hatchment of Joshua Vanneck, 2nd Baron Huntingfield in Huntingfield Church

Joshua Vanneck, 2nd Baron Huntingfield (12 August 1778 – 10 August 1844) of Heveningham Hall in Suffolk, was a British peer and Member of Parliament (MP).

Huntingfield was the son of Joshua Vanneck, 1st Baron Huntingfield, and Maria Thompson. His paternal grandfather Sir Joshua Vanneck, 1st Baronet, had emigrated from the Netherlands in 1722 and had become a prominent London merchant. In 1816 Huntingfield succeeded his father both as second Baron Huntingfield and as Tory Member of Parliament for Dunwich, a seat he held until 1819. The barony of Huntingfield was an Irish peerage and did not entitle him to a seat in the House of Lords.

Lord Huntingfield married, firstly, Frances Catherine Arcedeckne, daughter of Chaloner Arcedeckne, in 1810. She died in 1815 and in 1817 he married, secondly, Lucy Anne Blois, daughter of Sir Charles Blois, 6th Baronet. He died in August 1844, aged 65, and was succeeded in his titles and estates by his son from his second marriage, Charles. Lady Huntingfield died in 1889.

== Arms ==
Coat of arms of Joshua Vanneck, 2nd Baron Huntingfield
Crest A bugle horn Gules between two wings elevated Argent tipped Or. Escutcheon Argent three bugle horns two and one Gules stringed Or and in the fess point a torteau. Supporters Two greyhounds Ermine each gorged with a collar paly of six Gules and Or and chained Gold. Motto Droit Et Loyal}

Parliament of the United Kingdom
Preceded by The Lord Huntingfield; Michael Barne	Member of Parliament for Dunwich; 1816–1819; With: Michael Barne	Succeeded by Michael Barne; William Alexander Mackinnon
Peerage of Ireland
Preceded by Joshua Vanneck	Baron Huntingfield; 1816–1844	Succeeded by Charles Andrew Vanneck
