= Wilderness Reserve =

Private estate in England, partly rewilding

Coordinates: 52.276980°N 1.481481°E

Wilderness Reserve is a private estate of 8,000 acres (3,200 ha) in Suffolk's Yox Valley assembled by Jon Hunt since 1995 incorporating estates of Sibton Park, 4,500 acres (1,800 ha), Heveningham Hall, 467 acres (189 ha), Cockfield Hall, 40 acres (16 ha) and other land acquisitions within the catchments of the River Yox and Blyth Valley. The estate, which offers high-end holiday accommodation within an un-fenced landscape developed for wildlife and leisure activities includes a recently completed design for parkland and lakes by celebrated landscape architect Capability Brown (1716–1783).

== History ==
The land and buildings for Wilderness Reserve have been assembled over time with various land purchases by Hunt.

The first purchase was Heveningham Hall in 1994 of 467 acres (189 ha), however but it was the later purchase of the nearby 4,500 acres (1,800 ha) Sibton Park estate that marked the start of the main Wilderness Reserve project. Various other acquisitions of land and buildings have also been made, including Cockfield Hall.

== Capability Brown design realised ==
Designs for the grounds of Heveningham Hall commissioned from Capability Brown in 1782 by Gerard Vanneck, the then owner of hall, were only partly implemented following the death of the client the following year.

Hunt set about restoring Brown's original design, soon after purchasing hall in 1994 and sought the help of landscape architect Kim Wilkie. During the restoration of Brown's vision required the removal of modern features inconsistent with an 18th-century design including concrete roads, car parks, telegraph poles and farm outbuildings were either demolished or buried. and Wilkie says that "98 per cent" of Brown's original 600-acre design at Heveningham were now in place.

Wider areas have been developed according to principles that Brown would recognise as consistent with an Arcadian pleasure ground including lakes, parkland and woods and various historic manor houses.

== Rewilding ==
The estate includes part of the valleys of the River Blyth and River Yox that lead to the nearby Minsmere nature reserve on the Heritage Coast. Hunt has said that he wanted to allow nature to recover naturally by rewilding much of the land. Country Life magazine reported, "…sharp-leaved fluellen, field madder, heartsease, corn mint – these and other plants that an arable farmer would regard as weeds flourish unsprayed". Returning this farmland to the wild over two decades has allowed significant numbers of animal species, flora and fauna to settle in the area.

Hunt has created new areas of pines, lakes and meadows, planting 800,000 trees and managing land for wildflowers. 2,000 nest boxes have been installed and there are now breeding populations of raptors, barn owls, buzzards and other at-risk species, together with many other mammal, amphibian, moth and butterfly populations. Country Life reports that the estate supports 13 pairs of breeding owls and is visited by bitterns. In 2013 it was reported that 72,000 ash trees under the threat of European chalara disease would need to be removed from the estate, to be replaced by hornbeam and oak.

== Accommodation ==
Many buildings have been converted to offer high-end holiday accommodation:

- Sibton Park, an 1827 Georgian Grade II listed manor house.
- Sibton Park Walled Garden, accommodation for 16 people (as featured in New York Times in 2016).
- Garden Cottage, sleeps 6, abutting the Walled Garden
- Farmhouse, sleeps 12. Thatched house close to walled garden.
- Cartshed
- Clockhouse
- Barn
- Gate Lodges
- Hex Cottage
- Moat Cottage
- The Grange
- The Cider House
- The Hovel
- The Tabernacle
- Tennis Pavilion
- Together with various farmhouses, lodges and barns

Hunt's private residence, Heveningham Hall is adjacent to the estate, but some buildings within the estate have been made available for holiday accommodation, including a clockhouse, barn and a gate lodge, as well as a farmhouse said to have been visited by Alexa Chung. In 2013, Hunt told the Financial Times: "Farming alone won't pay for a modern estate to survive. Real estate will."
