= Michael Barne (politician) =

British politician

Lieutenant-Colonel Michael Barne (3 June 1759 – 19 June 1837) was a British military officer and a Member of Parliament for Dunwich between 1812 and 1830.

== Early life and family ==
Born on 3 June 1759, Barne was the fourth son of Miles Barne of Sotterley, Suffolk, and his second wife, Mary Thornhill, a daughter of George Thornhill of Diddington, Huntingdonshire. He was educated at Westminster School in the years 1772–73, before admission to Trinity Hall, Cambridge, in 1774; he matriculated in 1777.

== Military career ==
After matriculating from Cambridge, Barne began his military career as a Cornet in the 7th Dragoons in 1778. His family connections furthered his promotion through the armed forces: Captain, 1783, Major, 1794, and Lieutenant-Colonel in 1799. Additionally, he was Commandant of the 7th Dragoons under the Duke of York in the Dutch Campaign of 1793-4 and in the Helder expedition of 1799. He retired from active service in 1804, before taking up a commission in the Yeomanry Volunteers in 1805.

== Member of Parliament ==
After his elder brother, Snowdon Barne, took up a Commission on the Custom Board in 1812, the seat he had held in the constituency of Dunwich fell vacant. The Barne family had held this seat in their ‘pocket’ since 1764 and its dwindling population led to it becoming a notorious "Rotten Borough". There was, therefore, no real contest to Michael Barne superseding his brother and he became the M.P. in 1812. He was not an active Member and is not known to have spoken in a debate prior to 1820, but did vote, largely with the Government, on some measures prior to that year; for instance, he voted against Catholic relief in 1813 and 1817, and supported ministers on army matters and property tax in 1816.

He voted (1821) with the Government over its conduct in the trial of Queen Caroline, and against Catholic relief in 1822 and 1825. He was returned again in 1826, and voted against Catholic relief twice more in 1827 and 1828; he was expected to vote for Catholic Emancipation in 1829, but opposed it and went on to oppose Jewish Emancipation the following year. In 1830, he stepped down to allow his son, Frederick Barne, become MP for the borough.

== Family and later life ==
On 2 October 1798, Barne married Mary Boucherett, sister of Ayscoghe Boucherett, MP for Great Grimbsy, and daughter of the elder Ayscoghe Boucherett, of Willingham and Stallingborough, Lincolnshire, of which county he was High Sheriff in 1754, and Mary White, his wife. Mrs Barne died at Sotterley on 11 December 1858, aged 94, and was buried on 20 December. Together, they had two children:

- Emilia Mary Barne (1800–1892). She married on 22 May 1839 to General Sir Edward Bowater, KCH, of Hampton Court. She died at Thatched House Lodge, Richmond Park, aged 92, on 25 March 1892.
- Captain Frederick Barne, JP DL (1801–1890). Member of Parliament for Dunwich, 1830–32.

Barne succeeded to the estate of his elder brother, Snowdon, on his death in 1825. He would spend the last years of his life concerned with maintaining the family's estates and financial interests, and spent his time either at Dunwich or in London. Michael Barne died on 19 June 1837 in Grosvenor Street, London, and was buried on 8 July at Dunwich.

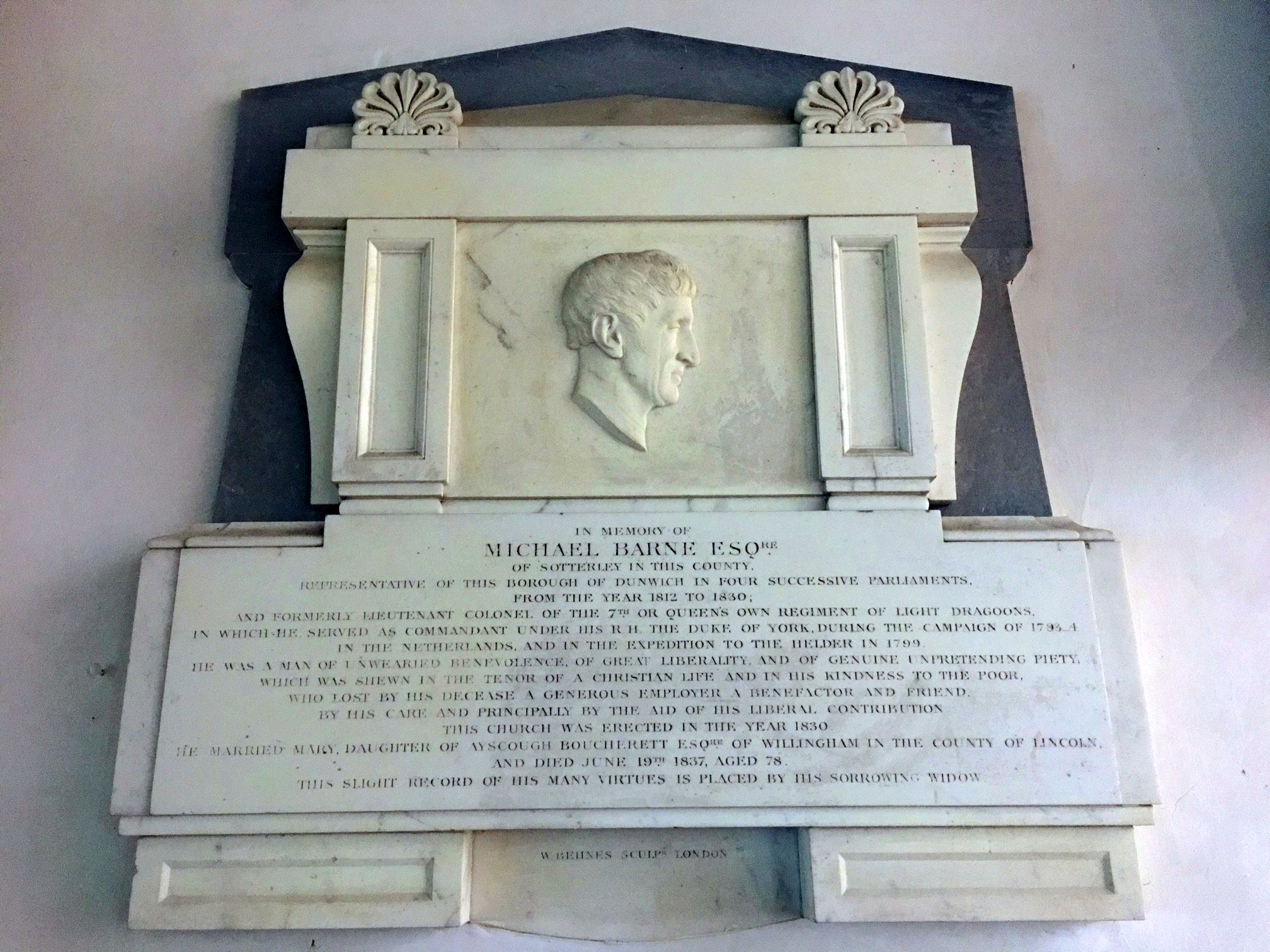
Michael Barne memorial in St James's Church, Dunwich

Parliament of the United Kingdom
Preceded by The Lord Huntingfield I Snowdon Barne	Member of Parliament for Dunwich; 1812–1830; With: The Lord Huntingfield I to 1816; The Lord Huntingfield II 1816–1819; William Alexander Mackinnon 1819–1820; George Henry Cherry 1820–1826; Andrew Arcedeckne from 1826	Succeeded by Andrew Arcedeckne; Frederick Barne
