= Snowdon Barne =

British politician

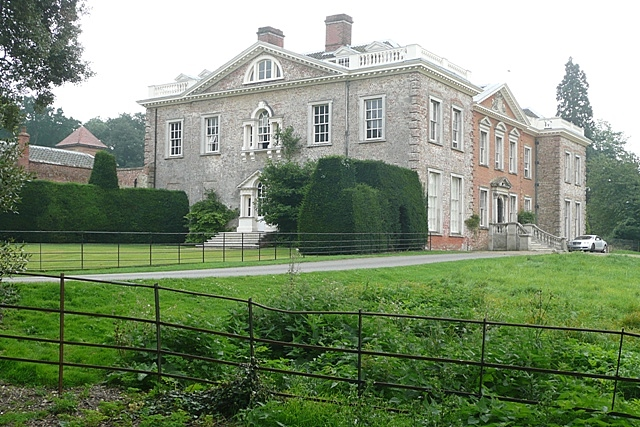
Sotterley Hall, Barne's family home in Suffolk

Snowdon Barne (26 December 1756 – 3 July 1825) was a lawyer and a British Member of Parliament, who represented the Dunwich seat from 1796 to 1812.

== Family and early career ==
Born on 26 December 1756, he was the third son of Miles Barne of Sotterley, Suffolk, and his second wife, Mary Thornhill, a daughter of George Thornhill of Diddington, Huntingdonshire. He was educated at Westminster School and then matriculated at Trinity Hall, Cambridge, in 1776, gaining LL.B. in 1781 and then becoming a fellow in 1786. He was admitted at the Inner Temple on 11 June 1773 and then migrated to the Middle Temple at that date in 1782, having been called to the Bar in 1781, from which time he began practising on the Western circuit. He later became a Bencher of the Inner Temple, in 1816.

== Member of Parliament ==
In 1796, the ill health of his eldest brother, Miles Barne, who was already quite reluctant to be a member, left the family seat of Dunwich vacant (Dunwich was a notorious "Rotten Borough" and remained in the pocket of the Barne family from 1764 until the Great Reform Act). Given that the elder brother, Barne Barne, had been appointed Commissioner of Taxes in 1791, it fell upon Snowdon Barne, who had not been "making that progress in his profession which … might have been expected", to take over the seat. He gave silent support to Pitt the Younger's administration, but tended to oppose Addington's, voting with the opposition on the defence questions that brought down that ministry in 1804.

He continued to support Pitt when he became Prime Minister after Addingtion's defeat; he voted against censuring Lord Melville in 1805 and sat on a Committee to investigate the Eleventh Naval Report, both acts allowing him to obtain a reward for his service from Pitt, who had him appointed Lord Treasurer's Remembrancer in 1806. He declined the offer from Spencer Perceval to be Secretary to the Treasury, citing the workload, but was made one of the Lords Commissioners of the Treasury in 1809 and being reappointed each year thereafter until 1812; during that time, he voted in favour of the Government, making clear his desire for a place on the Custom Board. His support in several Bills during 1811 and 1812 saw this realised and he was appointed to that Board in 1812.

== Later life and death ==
With the retirement of the joint Chairmen of the Commissioners of Customs, William Roe and Francis Fownes Luttrell, in 1819, Richard Betenson Dean became Chairman and Barne was appointed deputy chairman. He suffered from a "stoke of the palsy" in 1822 and, although recovering to some degree, decided to resign that office in 1823; he died, unmarried, on 3 July 1825 and was buried at Sotterley.

Parliament of Great Britain
Preceded by Lord Huntingfield; Miles Barne	Member of Parliament for Dunwich; 1796–1800; With: Lord Huntingfield	Succeeded by Parliament of the United Kingdom
Parliament of the United Kingdom
Preceded by Parliament of Great Britain	Member of Parliament for Dunwich; 1801–1812; With: Lord Huntingfield	Succeeded by Lord Huntingfield; Michael Barne
