= Jon Hunt =

British entrepreneur (born 1953)

- Born: Jonathan Michael Hunt; June 1953 (age 73); Colchester, Essex, England
- Education: Millfield
- Occupation: Estate agent
- Known for: Founder, Foxtons
- Spouse: Lois
- Children: 4 including; Harry Hunt

Jonathan Michael Hunt (born June 1953), is a British billionaire property entrepreneur. He is best known as the founder of UK estate agency Foxtons, and is more recently known as the founder of Pavilion, a business members club chain. He has developed Wilderness Reserve, an area of restored natural lakes, parkland and woods situated in Suffolk's Yox Valley.

== Early life and career ==
Hunt was born in June 1953 in Colchester, UK into an army family. Hunt was awarded a scholarship to Millfield boarding school. He left after 'O' Levels to join the army, passing basic training for the Royal Artillery, where his father had been a colonel.

After leaving the army, and following a short spell washing cars in Ottawa, Canada, Hunt returned to the UK in 1972 and spent the next eight years working as an estate agent in Woking and Guildford, Surrey.

In 2021, the Sunday Times Rich List estimated his net worth at £1.345 billion.

== Foxtons ==
Hunt's property career began at age 19 when he borrowed a £100 deposit to buy a one-bedroom conversion flat in Walton Road, Woking for £4,500.

In 1981 Hunt, then aged 28, founded Foxtons with school friend Anthony Pelligrinelli, who put in £30,000 to fund the business in its first year. The company took its name from a village near Hunt's Suffolk home. Hunt has since commented:

"When Foxtons opened in 1981 I had no idea there was a recession going on. I didn't often read the newspapers let alone the business pages."

The firm's office in London's Notting Hill Gate neighbourhood distinguished itself from competing estate agents by opening a then-unusual 74 hours a week, including weekend and evening hours, rather than the conventional 40 hours worked by rival estate agents. Foxtons expanded to other London districts, each new branch offering a 0% commission in its first three months of operation to attract customers, thereafter charging higher rates than competitors.

The property crash of 1988–94 had a severe impact on the firm. In a 2010 interview, Hunt recalled:

"…Foxtons had no significant lettings department and as a consequence it barely hung on – we were close to going bust every day".

The experience prompted Hunt to expand into lettings, relying on the additional income stream to cover operating costs during future downturns.

Other notable Foxtons initiatives from Hunt included an early web presence, initiated in 1999, and an 800-strong fleet of branded Minis driven by agents.

During Hunt's tenure Foxtons grew to 20 branches, over 1,600 employees in the UK and US, £110 million in turnover and £34 million profits. Director Magazine called the company "...London's biggest, brashest estate agency." Hunt is quoted as saying that Foxtons clients expected it "…go to war for them", while others described the company culture as overly competitive. A 2006 BBC documentary of the UK estate agency industry accused Foxtons agents of misleading clients, falsifying signatures and destroying the signs of rival agencies. Hunt later agreed that the company had made mistakes, though he felt the programme was edited unfairly.

Hunt sold Foxtons to private equity group BC Partners for £375 million in May 2007, at what some commentators described as the height of the UK property market. Interviewed by the Evening Standard newspaper in 2010, Hunt insisted that his timing of the sale was straightforward:

"If you remember, there was a rampant market ... I did think this is roughly the right time and if you're going to go, go now. I'm absolutely not a genius."

== Property investments ==
Since selling Foxtons, Hunt has made significant investments into commercial and residential property in central London. These investments, along with other family property holdings, are managed by Ocubis Ltd. In December 2011 Ocubis received planning consent for a 120,000 square foot mixed use redevelopment of its building at 150 Holborn, designed by Make Architects. Ocubis also refurbished the 120,000 sq ft Fulham Green Campus next to Putney Bridge tube station in 2012 and their agents Savills, Frost Meadowcroft and Hanover Green let these offices to tenants including Emma Bridgewater, Hurtigruten, Green Fields Technology and Sweaty Betty.

In May 2013 Ocubis purchased the Grade II* listed building at No.5 St James's Square, formerly the Libyan Embassy. The Times newspaper reports that Hunt plans to refurbish the building to provide 15,000 sq ft of office space, along with 13 luxury flats currently under construction on an adjoining site. In October 2015, the parent company for Ocubis filed accounts showing that pre-tax profits in 2014 reached £3 million, up from £1.6 million the year before, with staff numbers rising to 82 from 61. The company is said to be seeking rents of £160 per sq ft for its office building at 5 St James's Square, making it among the most expensive in London.

In 2010, Hunt formed Bacchus Partners, which invests in sites suitable for residential or retail development in the South East of England. Focusing on sites between £200,000 and £1 million in value, Bacchus works with local property professionals who identify suitable investments in their local area in exchange for an equity stake in the development project.

Hunt owns a property in Kensington Palace Gardens, London, known as London's most expensive street, where he plans to house his collection of vintage cars.

=== Pavilion ===
Hunt owns and operates Pavilion, a business members' club in Kensington High Street. Pavilion is an up-market serviced office catering to entrepreneurs and business executives; it has been described by The Times as "...an office rental club aimed at affluent start-ups". It opened under the name "Dryland" in 2011.

=== Heveningham Hall ===
Hunt purchased Heveningham Hall is a 5000-acre 18th-century Suffolk estate in 1994. It hosts an annual motorsport and classic car event, the Heveningham Hall Concours d'Elegance. It also hosts an annual country fair, reported to attract over 10,000 attendees. All proceeds from the fair go to local community charities.

The Grade I listed Palladian country house was designed by 18th-century English architects Sir Robert Taylor and James Wyatt; its garden was designed by noted 18th century landscape artist Capability Brown and is being restored by Kim Wilkie. The project is expected to require the planting of 800,000 trees. Up to 20 hectares of broadleaf woodland is being planted each year. Wilkie is implementing a set of plans drawn up by Brown that had lain abandoned since 1782. The plans had hitherto been unrecognised as Brown's work.

=== Wilderness Reserve ===
In 2013 Hunt launched the Wilderness Reserve, an area of restored natural lakes, parkland and woods surrounding Heveningham Hall situated in Suffolk's Yox Valley on the Heritage Coast. The reserve is part of a recently implemented design by the noted landscape architect 'Lancelot 'Capability' Brown (1716–1783). In developing the Reserve, Hunt purchased 5000 acres of land, restored buildings and oversaw the reintroduction of wildlife and various species of flora and fauna. Hunt's private residence is adjacent to the Reserve; within the Reserve Hunt has made various buildings available for private hire, including Sibton Hall. He told the Financial Times: "Farming alone won't pay for a modern estate to survive. Real estate will.". In 2014, Hunt also purchased Cockfield Hall in Yoxford in Suffolk, England, a Grade I listed private house standing in 76 acres (31 ha) of historic parkland, partly dating from the 16th century.

== Personal life ==
Hunt is married to Lois, a former nurse, and they have four children together including Harry Hunt. In press reports he is described as having the "bearing and manner of a former military man" and being "like an ex-SAS officer", as well as "famously tight-lipped". He is a known collector of classic Ferraris.
