= Pavilion (co-working business club) =

- Industry: Serviced offices
- Founded: 2011; 15 years ago
- Headquarters: London, UK
- Key people: Jon Hunt
- Products: Business members' clubs
- Website: pavilion.club

Pavilion is a British business members' club co-founded by the UK property entrepreneur Jon Hunt and his daughter Emma. It opened under the name "Dryland" on London's Kensington High Street at the end of 2011, offering work space.

== History ==
Media coverage of Pavilion's launch centred on the firm being one of the first public projects for Jon Hunt following his sale of Foxtons in a May 2007 deal that made him one of the wealthiest people in the UK.

Hunt has said that he originally entered the serviced office business only by accident, after buying a 1970s office building in London's Battersea district that he intended to convert into residential homes, only for planning officials to refuse permission for residential use.

== Concept ==
Pavilion claims to be the first "premium offering" in the serviced offices sector, providing members with private dining by in-house chefs and a concierge service. The Financial Times describes Pavilion as providing "...the atmosphere of a private members club and the hospitality of a five-star hotel."

In December 2015 the club launched at its premises The Ivy at Pavilion brasserie, a sister restaurant to The Ivy.

== Locations ==
The first Pavilion club opened on Kensington High Street at the end of 2011. The Hunts plan to expand the concept.
