= Andrew Arcedeckne =

British landowner and MP

Andrew Arcedeckne (8 January 1780 – 8 February 1849) was a British landowner and MP.

He was the eldest son of Jamaica plantation owner Chaloner Arcedeckne of Cockfield Hall and Glevering Hall, Suffolk and educated at Eton College and Christ Church, Oxford. He succeeded his father in 1809 and made Glevering Hall his home.

Arcedeckne was appointed High Sheriff of Suffolk for 1819–1820 and was Member of Parliament for the rotten borough of Dunwich from 1826 to 1831.

He owned two plantations in St Thomas in the East, Jamaica, Golden Grove and Bachelor's Hall Pen.

Arcedeckne married his cousin Ann Harriet, the daughter of Francis Love Beckford of Basing Park.

Parliament of the United Kingdom
Preceded by Michael Barne; George Henry Cherry	Member of Parliament for Dunwich; 1826–1831; With: Michael Barne to 1830; Frederick Barne from 1830	Succeeded by Frederick Barne; Earl of Brecknock
