= Baron Huntingfield =

Baron Huntingfield is a title created three times, twice in the Peerage of England and once in the Peerage of Ireland. The first two creations were by writ, but little more is known about them, except that John de Huntingfield, who was created Baron Huntingfield in 1362, married Margery (or Margaret) de Welles, daughter of John de Welles, 4th Baron Welles. John was dead by December 1376, when Margery remarried. Both titles probably became extinct or fell into abeyance on the death of their first holders. The third creation, Baron Huntingfield, of Heveningham Hall in the County of Suffolk, was created in the Peerage of Ireland in 1796 for Sir Joshua Vanneck, 3rd Baronet, Member of Parliament for Dunwich. His son, the second Baron, also represented this constituency in the House of Commons. His great-grandson, the fifth Baron (who succeeded his uncle), was Conservative Member of Parliament for Eye and Governor of Victoria. As of 2013 the titles are held by the latter's grandson, the seventh Baron, who succeeded his father in 1994.

The Vanneck Baronetcy, of Putney in the County of Surrey, was created in the Baronetage of Great Britain in 1751 for Joshua Vanneck, a London merchant of Dutch origin. His eldest son, the second Baronet, represented Dunwich in Parliament. He was succeeded in this seat and the baronetcy by his younger brother, the third Baronet, who was elevated to the peerage as Baron Huntingfield in 1796.

Sir Peter Vanneck, Lord Mayor of London in 1978, was the second son of the fifth Baron.

The former seat of the Vanneck family was Heveningham Hall near Heveningham and Huntingfield in Suffolk. However, the house was sold to the government in 1970.

As of 30 June 2006, the present holder of the barony has not successfully proven his succession to the baronetcy and is therefore not on the Official Roll of the Baronetage, with the baronetcy considered dormant. However, the case is under review by the Registrar of the Baronetage (for more information follow this link).

== Barons Huntingfield, First creation (1351) ==
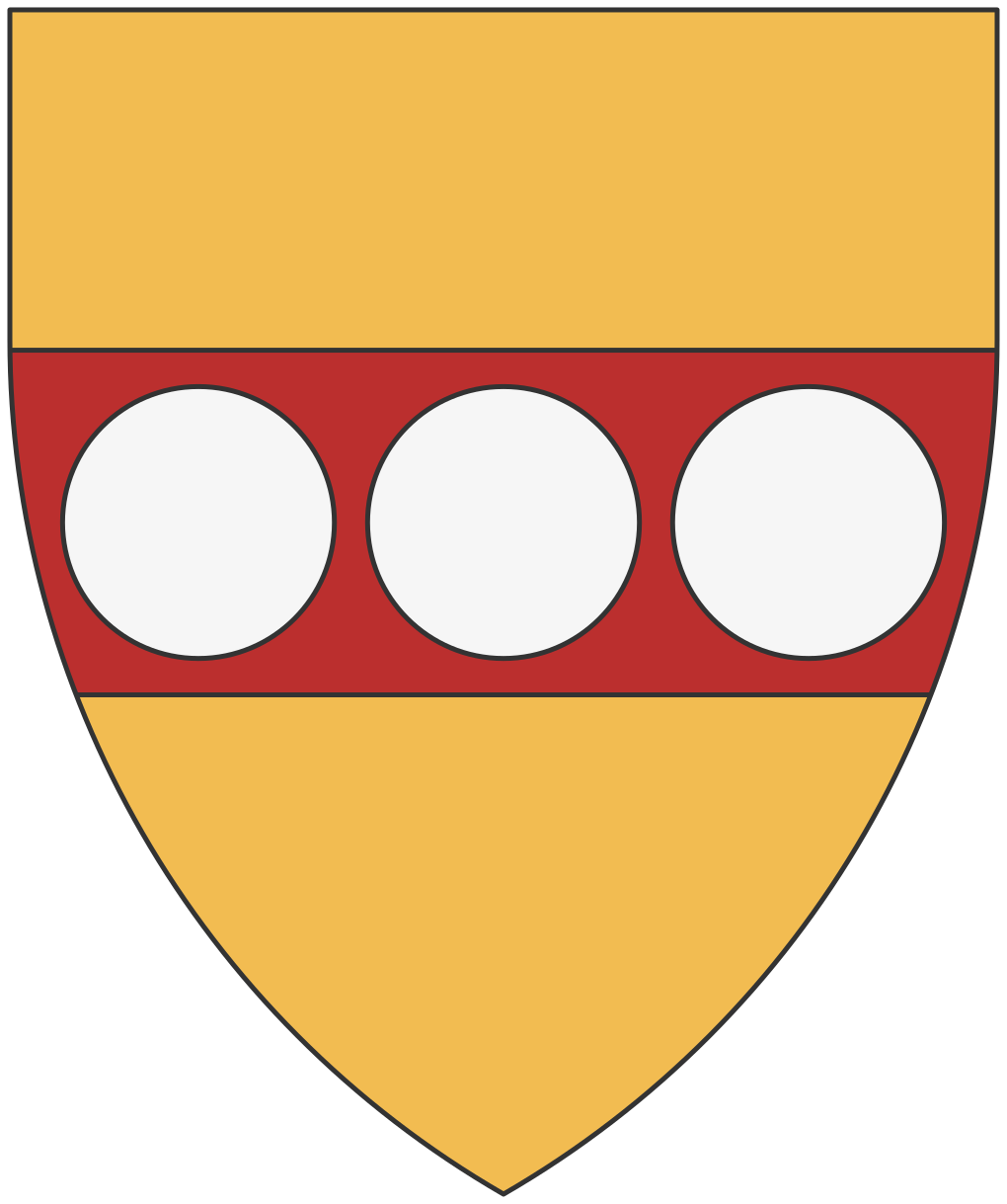
The Arms of Baron Huntingfield, (1st and 2nd creation).

- William de Huntingfield, 1st Baron Huntingfield (1329–1376)

== Barons Huntingfield, Second creation (1362) ==
- John de Huntingfield, 1st Baron Huntingfield

== Vanneck Baronets, of Putney (1751) ==
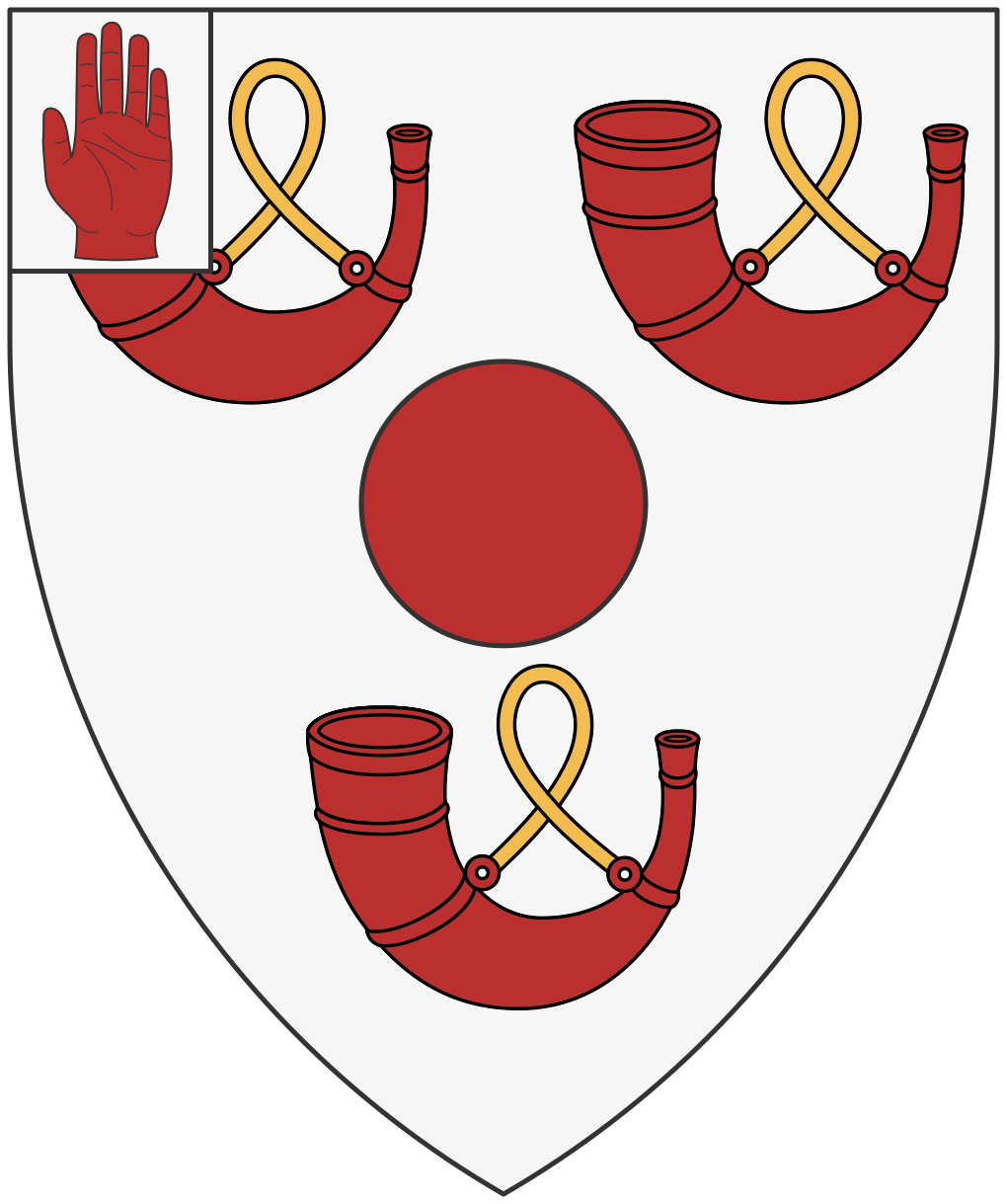
Arms of Vanneck of Putney, Barts.

- Sir Joshua Vanneck, 1st Baronet (died 1777)
- Sir Gerard Vanneck, 2nd Baronet (c. 1743–1791)
- Sir Joshua Vanneck, 3rd Baronet (1745–1816) (created Baron Huntingfield in 1796)

== Barons Huntingfield, Third creation (1796) ==
- Joshua Vanneck, 1st Baron Huntingfield (1745–1816)
- Joshua Vanneck, 2nd Baron Huntingfield (1778–1844)
- Charles Andrew Vanneck, 3rd Baron Huntingfield (1818–1897)
- Joshua Charles Vanneck, 4th Baron Huntingfield (1842–1915)
- William Charles Arcedeckne Vanneck, 5th Baron Huntingfield (1883–1969)
- Gerard Charles Arcedeckne Vanneck, 6th Baron Huntingfield (1915–1994)
- Joshua Charles Vanneck, 7th Baron Huntingfield (born 1954)

The heir apparent is the present holder's son Hon. Gerald Charles Alastair Vanneck (born 1985).

== Arms ==
Coat of arms of Baron Huntingfield
Crest A bugle horn Gules between two wings elevated Argent tipped Or. Escutcheon Argent three bugle horns two and one Gules stringed Or and in the fess point a torteau. Supporters Two greyhounds Ermine each gorged with a collar paly of six Gules and Or and chained Gold. Motto Droit Et Loyal

Baronetage of Great Britain
Preceded by Ibbetson baronets	Vanneck baronets of Putney; 14 December 1751	Succeeded by Gibbons baronets
