= Joshua Vanneck, 1st Baron Huntingfield =

British landowner, Irish peer

Joshua Vanneck, 1st Baron Huntingfield (31 December 1745 – 15 August 1816), known as Sir Joshua Vanneck, 3rd Baronet, from 1791 to 1796, was a British merchant and Member of Parliament.

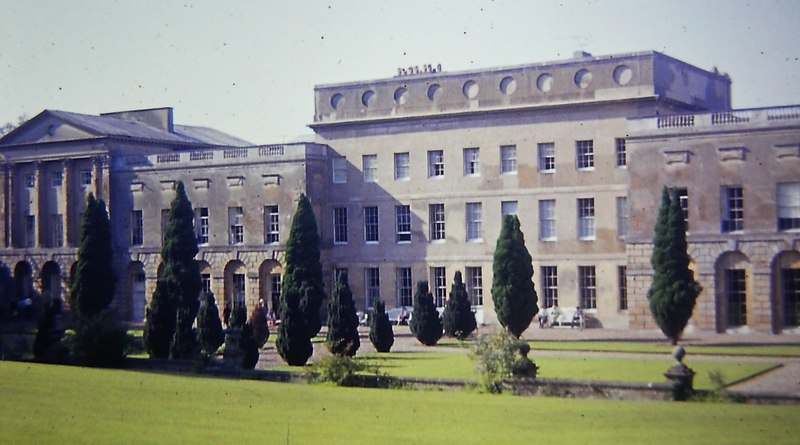
Heveningham Hall

Huntingfield was the second son of the London merchant Sir Joshua Vanneck, 1st Baronet, and Mary Anne Daubuz. The family was of Dutch origin. He was educated at Eton and then became a merchant in London like his father.

In 1774 Alexander Fordyce was forced to sell his splendid estate in Roehampton to Joshua Vanneck. After 1777 Grove House, Roehampton was rebuilt by James Wyatt and Robert Adam.

In 1790 he succeeded his elder brother as Member of Parliament for Dunwich, a seat he held until 1816, and in 1791 he also succeeded him as third Baronet, inheriting Heveningham Hall in Suffolk. In 1796 he was raised to the Peerage of Ireland as Baron Huntingfield, of Heveningham Hall in the County of Suffolk.

Lord Huntingfield married Maria Thompson, daughter of Andrew Thompson, in 1777. He died in August 1816, aged 70, and was succeeded in his titles by his eldest son Joshua.

== Arms ==
Coat of arms of Joshua Vanneck, 1st Baron Huntingfield
Crest A bugle horn Gules between two wings elevated Argent tipped Or. Escutcheon Argent three bugle horns two and one Gules stringed Or and in the fess point a torteau. Supporters Two greyhounds Ermine each gorged with a collar paly of six Gules and Or and chained Gold. Motto Droit Et Loyal}

Parliament of Great Britain
Preceded by Sir Gerard Vanneck, Bt; Barne Barne	Member of Parliament for Dunwich; 1790–1800; With: Barne Barne 1790–1791; Miles Barne 1791–1796; Snowdon Barne 1796–1800	Succeeded by Parliament of the United Kingdom
Parliament of the United Kingdom
Preceded by Parliament of Great Britain	Member of Parliament for Dunwich; 1801–1816; With: Snowdon Barne 1801–1812; Michael Barne 1812–1816	Succeeded by Michael Barne; The Lord Huntingfield
Peerage of Ireland
New creation	Baron Huntingfield; 1796–1816	Succeeded by Joshua Vanneck
Baronetage of Great Britain
Preceded by Gerard Vanneck	Baronet (of Putney); 1791–1816	Succeeded by Joshua Vanneck
