= Upper Denford =

Hamlet in Berkshire, England

Coordinates: 51.424408°N 1.483807°W

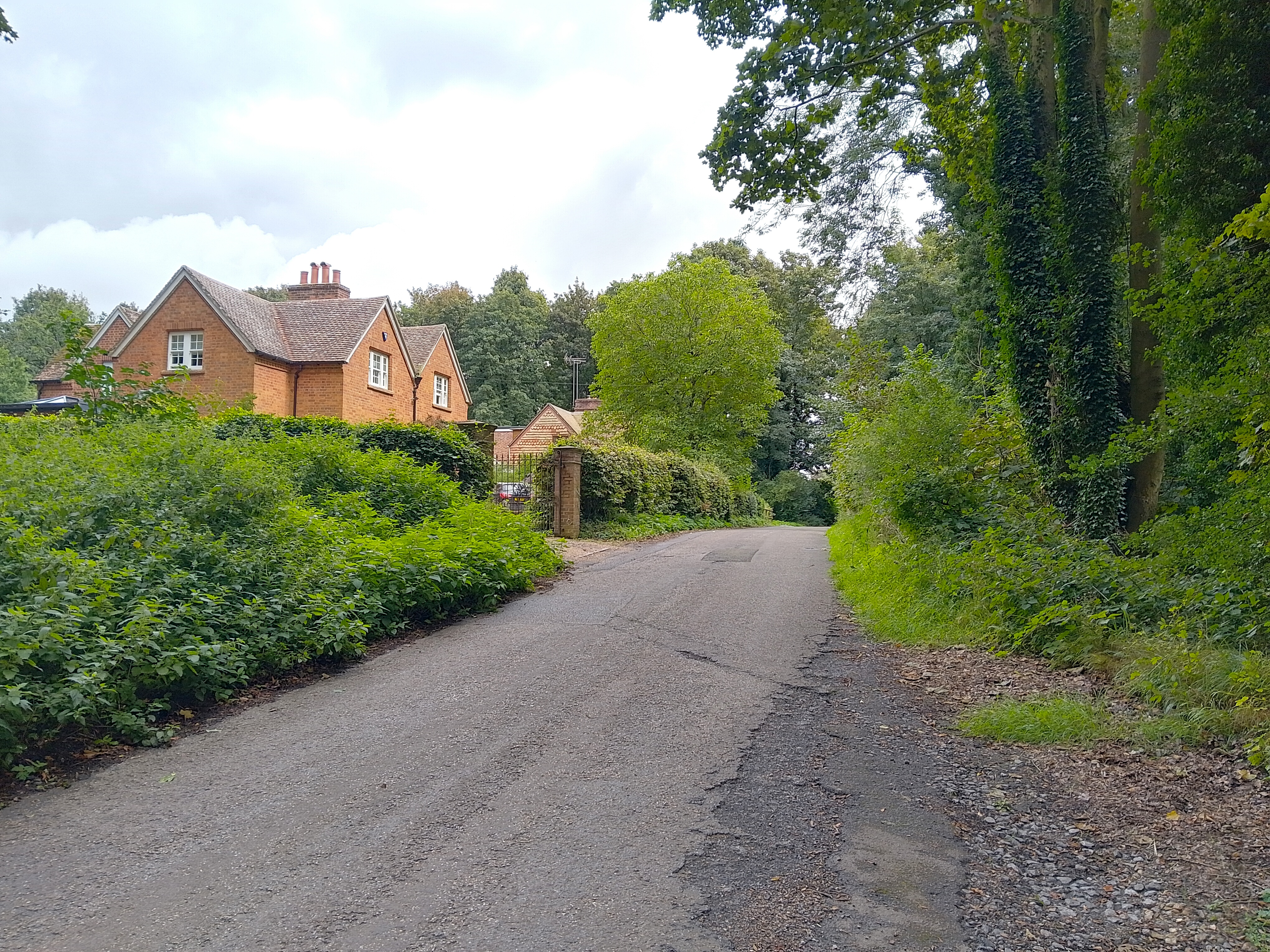
- Denford Lane

- Location within Berkshire
- OS grid reference: SU355695
- Metropolitan borough: West Berkshire
- Metropolitan county: Berkshire
- Region: South East
- Country: England
- Sovereign state: United Kingdom
- Post town: HUNGERFORD
- Postcode district: RG17
- Dialling code: 01488
- Police: Thames Valley
- Fire: Royal Berkshire
- Ambulance: South Central
- UK Parliament: Berkshire

Upper Denford is a hamlet in Berkshire, England, and part of the civil parish of Kintbury.

The settlement lies north of the A4 road, and is located approximately 1.5 miles (2.4 km) north-east of Hungerford. It is home to Denford Park.
