= Yox =

Yox may refer to:

- Yox, nickname of American baseball player Ken Harrelson
- River Yox, Suffolk, England
- yox, ISO 639-3 code for the Yoron language of Japan
