= George Cherry (cricketer) =

English cricketer and barrister

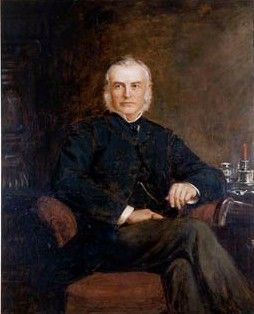

Personal information
- Full name: George Charles Cherry
- Born: 26 January 1822; Kintbury, Berkshire, England
- Died: 12 June 1887 (aged 65); Kintbury, Berkshire, England
- Batting: Unknown

Domestic team information
- Years: Team
- 1841–1844: Oxford University

Career statistics
Competition	First-class
Matches	9
Runs scored	122
Batting average	7.17
100s/50s	–/–
Top score	20
Catches/stumpings	2/–
- Source: Cricinfo, 11 February 2020

George Charles Cherry JP (26 January 1822 – 12 June 1887) was an English first-class cricketer and barrister.

The son of the politician George Henry Cherry, he was born in January 1822 at Kintbury, Berkshire. He was educated at Harrow School, before going up to Christ Church, Oxford. While studying at Oxford, he played first-class cricket for Oxford University, making his debut against the Marylebone Cricket Club at Oxford in 1841. He made eight further first-class appearances for Oxford, with his final appearance coming in 1844. In his nine first-class matches, he scored 122 runs at an average of 7.17, with a high score of 20.

A student of the Inner Temple, he was called to the bar in May 1848. He was the High Sheriff of Berkshire in 1871 and served as a justice of the peace. Cherry was the chairman of the Berkshire quarter sessions from 1885–87. He died at Denford House at Kintbury in June 1887. His grandfather was George Frederick Cherry, a political officer of the East India Company.
