= Thomas James Galloway =

General Thomas James Galloway
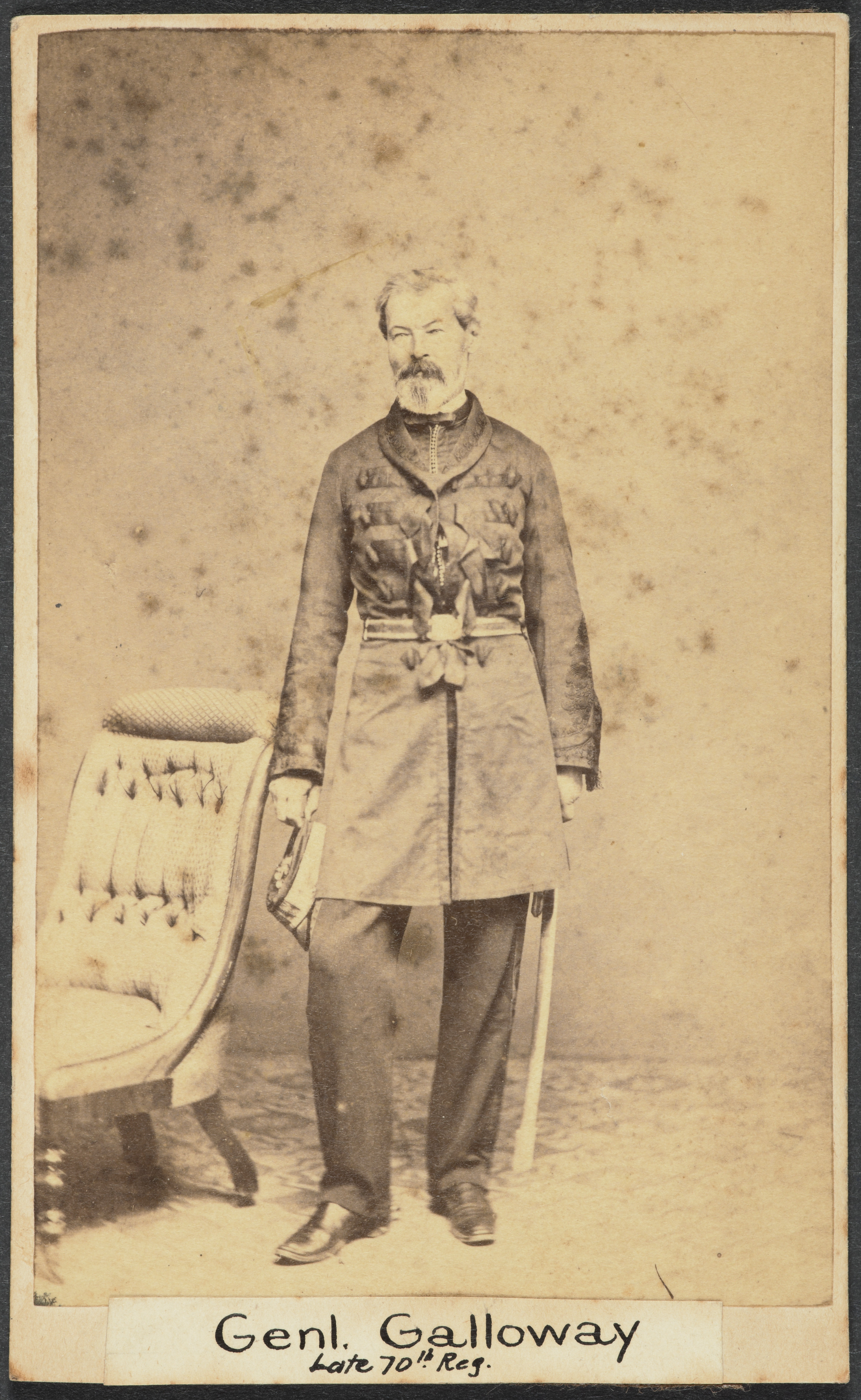
- Photograph of Galloway by an unknown photographer, c. 1860 (Te Papa)
- Born: c. 1806
- Died: 15 September 1881; Kilmeague, Co. Kildare, Ireland
- Military career
- Allegiance: United Kingdom
- Branch: British Army
- Service years: 1821–1881
- Rank: General
- Conflicts: Indian Mutiny; New Zealand Wars

General Thomas James Galloway (c. 1806 – 1881) was a senior officer in the British Army.

He joined the Army as an ensign in 1821 and was promoted lieutenant (1825) and then captain (1827). In command of a detachment of the 33rd Foot he was active in Jamaica during the Great Jamaican Slave Revolt of 1831–32.

He rose further through the ranks to major (1842), lieutenant colonel (1848) and colonel (1854). With the rank of brigadier he commanded the Peshawar brigade during the Indian Mutiny of 1857–58. In March 1861 he sailed to New Zealand with the last division of the 70th Foot where he was promoted major-general (1863) and commanded the Colonial Forces in Auckland Province until 1865 during the armed struggles.

He was the Colonel of the 49th (Princess Charlotte of Wales's) (Hertfordshire) Regiment of Foot from 1871 to 1874. He transferred to be last Colonel of the 70th Foot (from 1874 to 1881) and after their amalgamation briefly the Colonel of the 2nd Battalion of The East Surrey Regiment. He died at the home of his brother-in-law Rev. George Garrett at Kilmeague, co. Kildare in Ireland on 15 September 1881.

Military offices
| Preceded by Sir Henry Knight Storks | Colonel of the 70th (Surrey) Regiment of Foot; 1874–1881 | Succeeded by Amalgamated into East Surrey Regiment |
| Preceded by Sir Edmund Finucane Morris | Colonel of the 49th (Princess of Wales Hertfordshire) Regiment; 1871–1874 | Succeeded by Sir Charles Henry Ellice |
