= Barnes Lake =

Barnes Lake may refer to a location in the United States:

- Barnes Lake (Minnesota)
- Barnes Lake (Washington)
- Barnes Lake, Michigan, a community surrounding a lake of the same name
