= 49th (Princess Charlotte of Wales's) (Hertfordshire) Regiment of Foot =

Line infantry regiment of the British Army

- c. 1874 regimental glengarry badge for other ranks
- Active: 1743–1881
- Country: Great Britain (1743–1800); United Kingdom (1801–1881)
- Branch: British Army
- Type: Infantry
- Role: Line infantry
- Size: One battalion (1743–1813, 1814–1881); Two battalions (1813–1814)
- Garrison/HQ: Brock Barracks, Reading
- Colors: Full-green facings, silver lace
- Engagements: American War of Independence; French Revolutionary and Napoleonic Wars; War of 1812; First Opium War; Crimean War

The 49th (Princess Charlotte of Wales's) (Hertfordshire) Regiment of Foot was a line infantry regiment of the British Army. It was raised as Edward Trelawny's Regiment of Foot in 1743 in the British colony of Jamaica by Colonel Edward Trelawny, the colony's governor, from eight independent companies stationed in the colony. The regiment was ranked as the 63rd Regiment of Foot in 1747 and re-ranked as the 49th Regiment of Foot in 1751, the same year in which all regiments of foot became officially known by their numbers instead of their colonels. The regiment was sent to Ireland in 1764 and remained there until being sent to Newfoundland in 1772.

In 1775 the regiment was sent to Boston to serve in the American War of Independence, serving in North America until being sent to the West Indies in 1778. The regiment returned to Ireland in 1780 and was renamed the 49th (Hertfordshire) Regiment of Foot in 1782. In 1793 the regiment was redesignated as a marine unit for service in the French Revolutionary Wars and was sent to Dominica in 1794, returning to England in 1796. It served in attacks on the Low Countries and Denmark between 1798 and 1801 before losing its marine designation and being sent to Canada in 1802. The regiment served in the War of 1812 before returning to England in 1815.

Princess Charlotte of Wales, who was impressed by the regimental uniform, requested to be associated with the regiment. This resulted in the regiment being renamed the "49th (Princess Charlotte of Wales's) (Hertfordshire) Regiment of Foot" in 1816. The regiment was sent to China in 1840 for service in the First Opium War, returning to England in 1843. The regiment left for the Crimea in 1854 to serve in the Crimean War and returned in 1856. Under the Childers Reforms the regiment was amalgamated with the 66th (Berkshire) Regiment of Foot to form the Princess Charlotte of Wales's (Royal Berkshire Regiment) in 1881.

== History ==
=== Early service ===
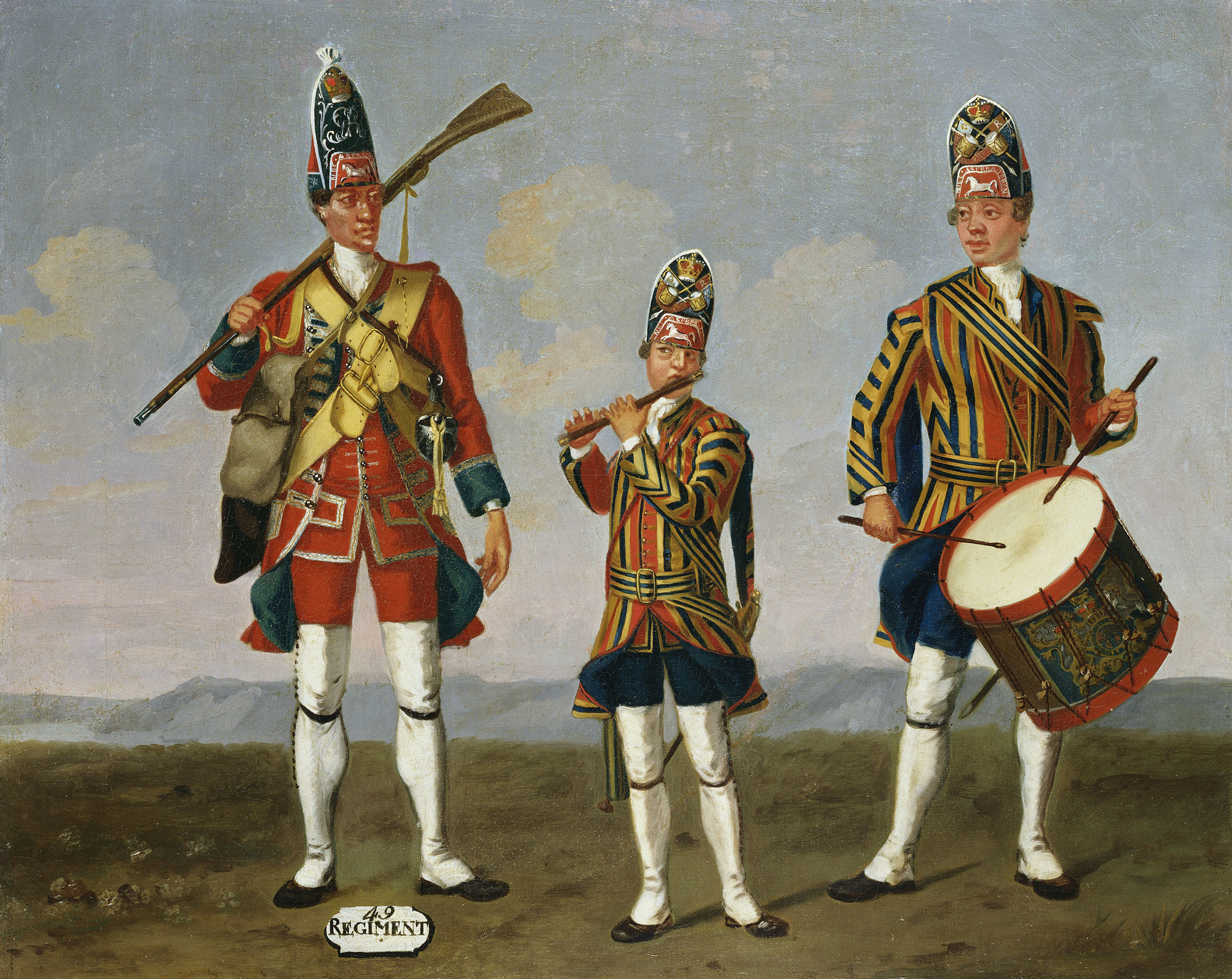
c. 1751 painting of a regimental grenadier (left)

The regiment was raised in 1743 in the British colony of Jamaica by Colonel Edward Trelawny, the colony's governor, as Edward Trelawny's Regiment of Foot. It was raised from eight independent companies of the British Army which had been stationed in the colony. The regiment was ranked as the 63rd Regiment of Foot in 1747 and re-ranked as the 49th Regiment of Foot in 1751, the same year in which all regiments of foot became officially known by their numbers instead of their colonels. The regiment arrived in Ireland in 1764 and remained there until embarking for Newfoundland in 1772.

The regiment was sent to Boston in June 1775 for service in the American War of Independence. It fought at the Battle of Long Island on 27 August 1776, the Battle of White Plains on 28 October and the Battle of Fort Washington on 16 November. The regiment went on to take part in the Philadelphia campaign, seeing action at the Battle of Brandywine on 11 September 1777, the Battle of Paoli on 20 September and the Battle of Germantown on 4 October. Following the Battle of Brandywine, where the regiment's light company took no prisoners and the Americans demanded vengeance, the regiment decided to insert red feathers into their hats to prevent anyone else suffering on their account.

The regiment embarked for the West Indies in summer 1778 and took part in the capture of St. Lucia in December 1778 before returning to Ireland in 1780. On 21 August 1782 the Commander-in-Chief of the Forces Henry Seymour Conway issued a regulation giving an English county designation to all regiments of foot other than those with a royal title or Highland regiments in order to improve recruitment during the unpopular American War of Independence. The 49th Regiment of Foot was among those which received a county distinction and as such was renamed the 49th (Hertfordshire) Regiment of Foot.

=== French Revolutionary and Napoleonic Wars and War of 1812 ===
In 1793 the regiment was redesignated as marines for service in the War of the First Coalition. In that capacity the regiment was sent to garrison Dominica in 1794. After returning to England in 1796, the regiment participated in the failed expedition to Ostend in May 1798 and was subsequently sent to the Batavian Republic in August 1799 as part of the Anglo-Russian invasion of Holland, seeing action at the Battle of Callantsoog on 27 August and the Battle of Alkmaar on 2 October. It also served under Admiral of the White Sir Hyde Parker at the Battle of Copenhagen in April 1801.

Regimental troops (left) at the Battle of Queenston Heights

After losing its marine designation, the regiment was deployed to Canada in 1802. The regiment served under Major-general Sir Isaac Brock at the Battle of Queenston Heights on 13 October 1812 during the War of 1812. The regiment returned home in 1815 to undertake royal guarding duties at Weymouth, Dorset. The regiment's new scarlet coats and white breeches so impressed Princess Charlotte of Wales that she asked to be associated with the regiment. The regiment accordingly became the 49th (Princess Charlotte of Wales's) (Hertfordshire) Regiment of Foot in 1816.

Sergeant James FitzGibbon was amongst those soldiers who landed with the regiment in 1802. FitzGibbon became a member of the Family Compact, who essentially owned and operated the Upper Canadian economy and society through business, marriage, or political ties. He was present during the Rebellions of 1837-1838, fighting against political reformers at the Battle of Montgomery's Tavern alongside future first Prime Minister of Canada John A. Macdonald.

=== Victorian era ===
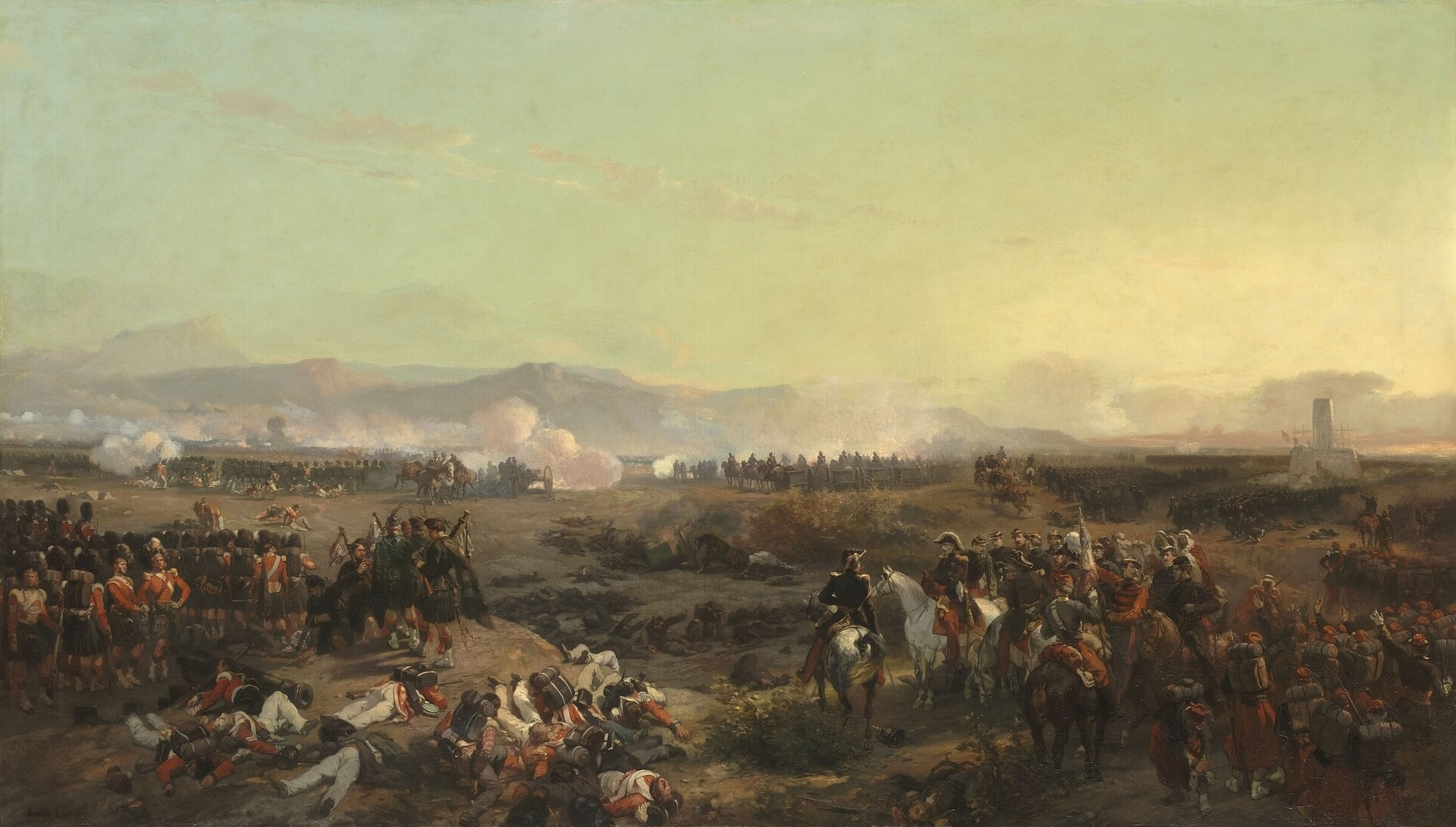
The Battle of Alma, which the regiment fought in

The regiment was sent to China in 1840 for service in the First Opium War. It fought at the Capture of Chusan in July 1840, the Battle of Canton in March 1841 and the Battle of Amoy in August 1841 as well as the occupation of Shanghai in summer 1842. It then returned home in 1843. The regiment departed for service in the Crimean War in early 1854 and fought at the Battle of Alma in September 1854, the Battle of Inkerman in November 1854 and the Siege of Sevastopol in winter 1854. It then returned home in 1856.

As part of the Cardwell Reforms of the 1870s, where single-battalion regiments were linked together to share a single depot and recruiting district in the United Kingdom, the 49th was linked with the 66th (Berkshire) Regiment of Foot, and assigned to district no. 41 at Brock Barracks in Reading. On 1 July 1881 the Childers Reforms came into effect and the regiment amalgamated with the 66th (Berkshire) Regiment of Foot to form the Princess Charlotte of Wales's (Royal Berkshire Regiment).

== Battle honours ==
Battle honours awarded to the regiment included:

- Egmont-op-Zee, Copenhagen, Queenstown, China
- Crimean War: Alma, Inkerman, Sevastopol
- St. Lucia 1778 (awarded to successor regiment in 1909)

== Victoria Crosses ==
Victoria Crosses awarded to men of the regiment were:

- Lieutenant John Augustus Conolly, Crimea War (26 October 1854)
- Corporal James Owens, Crimea War (30 October 1854)
- Sergeant George Walters, Crimea War (5 November 1854)

== Colonels of the Regiment ==
Colonels of the regiment were:

- 1743–1754: Col. Edward Trelawny
- 1754–1761: Lt-Gen. George Walsh
- 1761–1764: Lt-Gen. John Stanwix
- 1764–1768: Maj-Gen David Graeme
- 1768–1820: Gen. Sir Alexander Maitland, 1st Baronet
- 1820–1829: Lt-Gen. Sir Miles Nightingall, KCB
- 1829–1846: Gen. Sir Gordon Drummond, GCB
- 1846–1861: Gen. Sir Edward Bowater, KCH
- 1861–1871: Gen. Sir Edmund Finucane Morris, KCB
- 1871–1874: Gen. Thomas James Galloway
- 1874–1881: Gen. Sir Charles Ellice, GCB
