= Sotterley Park =

Protected area in Suffolk, England

Coordinates: 52.41°N 1.62°E

- Site of Special Scientific Interest
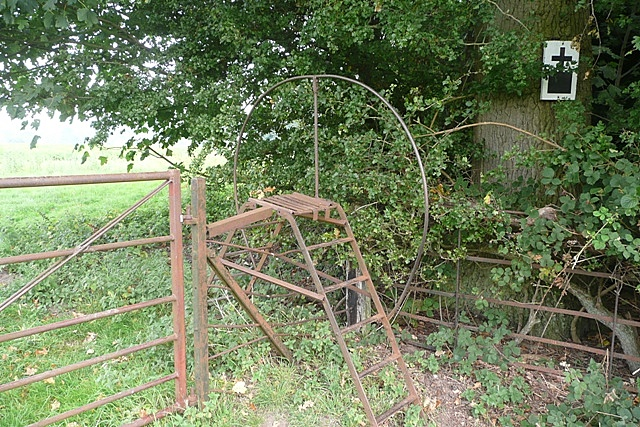
- Location of Sotterley Park.
- Area of search: Suffolk
- Grid reference: TM 460 852
- Interest: Biological
- Area: 123.2 hectares
- Notification date: 1985
- Location map: Magic Map

Sotterley Park is a 123.2-hectare (304-acre) biological Site of Special Scientific Interest in Sotterley in Suffolk. It is a Nature Conservation Review site, Grade I.

This park was laid out in the eighteenth century, but it goes back at least to the early medieval period, and may retain areas of primary forest. It has many large and ancient trees, which have the richest epiphytic lichen flora in East Anglia, with 92 recorded species. There are also 14 species of bryophytes.

The park is private land, but there is access to footpaths.
