= Edward Bowater =

British Army general

General Sir Edward Bowater KCH
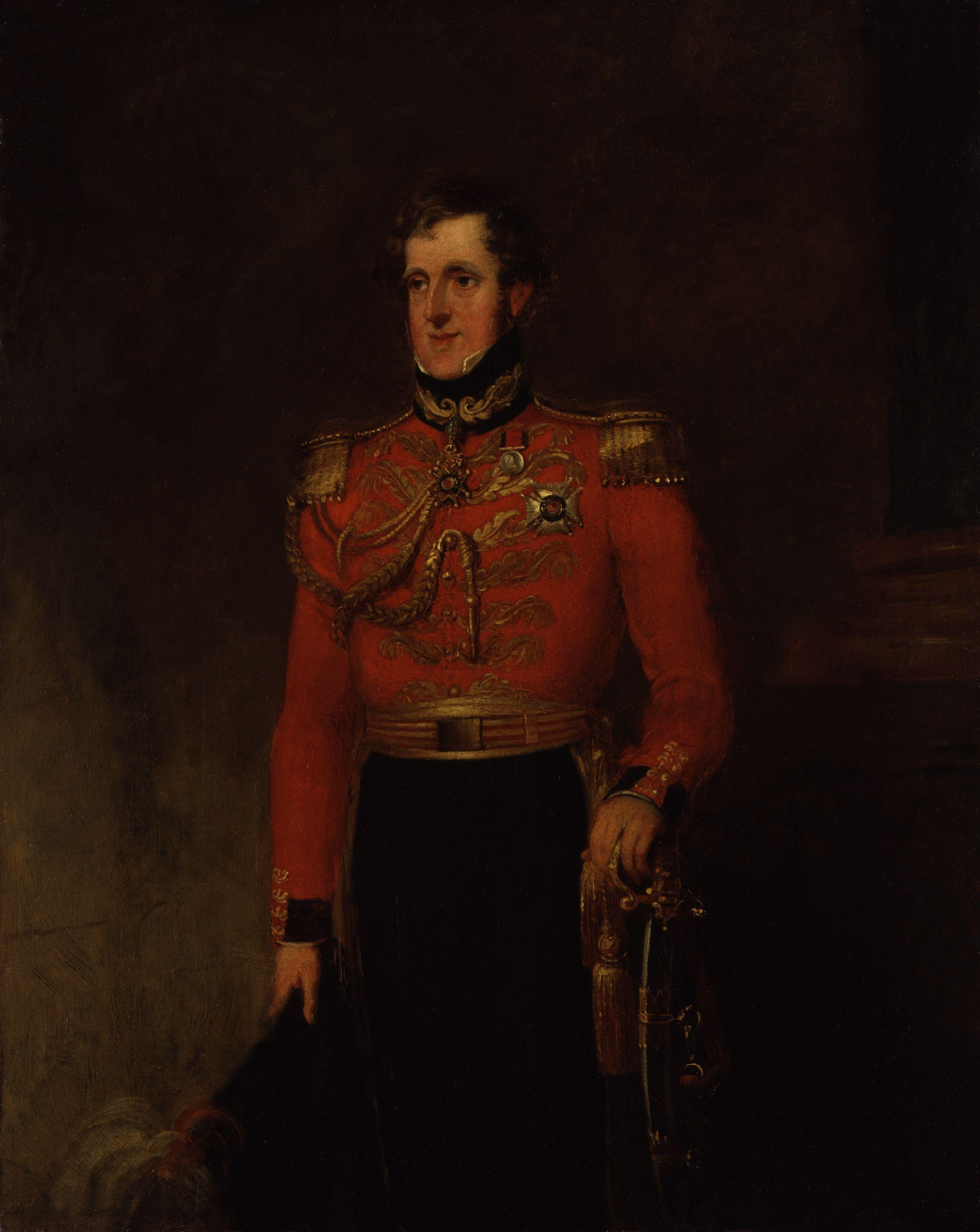
- Portrait by William Salter, 1837–1840

Personal details
- Born: 13 July 1787
- Died: 14 December 1861 (aged 74)

Sir Edward Bowater (13 July 1787 – 14 December 1861) was a British Army general and courtier.

== Background and education ==
Born in St James's Palace, Bowater descended from a Coventry family and was the only son of the Admiral Edward Bowater. His mother Louisa was the daughter of Thomas Lane and widow of George Edward Hawkins, who had served as serjeant surgeon to King George III. He was educated at Harrow School and went then to the University of Oxford, where he graduated with a Doctor of Civil Law.

== Military career ==
He entered the British Army in 1804 and was commissioned as ensign into the 3rd Foot Guards. Bowater was present in the Battle of Copenhagen (1807) and was then transferred with his regiment to Portugal. He joined the Taking of Porto and following the Battle of Talavera, where he was wounded, he purchased a lieutenancy in August 1809. In December he left for England, however returned to the Peninsular War after two years. He fought in the Battle of Salamanca in July 1812 and the Siege of Burgos in October. In the following year Bowater took part in the Battle of Vitoria in June and then was commanded to the Siege of San Sebastián until September 1813. A month later, he served in the Battle of the Bidassoa and in December was involved in the fightings of the Battle of the Nive.

Bowater was advanced to a captain and lieutenant-colonel in 1814, receiving command of a company, and when Napoleon returned from his exile in 1815, he led his men in the Battle of Quatre Bras. He was wounded again in the Battle of Waterloo in June. In 1826, Bowater was promoted to colonel and in 1837 to major-general, after which he was awarded a Knight Commander of the Royal Guelphic Order. He obtained the colonelship of the 49th Regiment of Foot in April 1846 and became lieutenant-general in November. In 1854 he was made a full general.

== At court ==
Bowater was nominated an equerry to King William IV in 1832, a position he held until the King's death six years later. In 1840 he was admitted to Prince Albert, who had shortly before arrived at the court, until 1846, when he was appointed Groom in Waiting in Ordinary to the latter's wife Queen Victoria.

== Personal life ==
In 1839, Bowater married Emilia Mary, the daughter of Colonel Michael Barne. Their only daughter Louisa became the wife of Rainald Knightley, 1st Baron Knightley. Bowater died after short illness in Cannes in 1861, on the same day as his former master the Prince Consort, while accompanying the latter's son Prince Leopold on a sojourn.

== Notes ==
Court offices
Preceded by Hon. Arthur Duncombe	Groom in Waiting in Ordinary; 1846–1861	Succeeded by Lord James Murray
Military offices
Preceded by Sir Gordon Drummond	Colonel of the 49th Regiment of Foot; 1846–1861	Succeeded by Edmund Finucane Morris
