= Edmund Finucane Morris =

British Army general

General Sir Edmund Finucane Morris KCB
- Born: 26 April 1792; Jamaica
- Died: 4 December 1871 (aged 79); Southampton, England
- Military career
- Allegiance: United Kingdom
- Branch: Army
- Rank: General
- Conflicts: First Opium War
- Awards: KCB

General Sir Edmund Finucane Morris, KCB (26 April 1792 – 4 December 1871) was a senior officer in the British Army.

He was born in Jamaica, the 11th child of Samuel Morris, and joined the army as an ensign in 1810.

He served with the 49th Foot during the Anglo-American War of 1812 where he was present at the actions of Fort George, Stoney Creek and Plattsburg. He rose to Lieutenant in 1813, Captain in 1825, Major in 1833 and Lieutenant-Colonel in 1836.

With the regiment in China during the First Opium War in 1841-2 he commanded a brigade at the successful storming of the Canton Heights and was made CB. He commanded a brigade at the Battle of Amoy and the second capture of Chusan, and was in charge of the central column at the capture of the Heights of Chinhai. As Commander of the British force at Ningpo he led the repulsing of the Chinese attempt to regain the city in 1842. He was also in command of brigades at the capture of Chinese positions on the Heights of Segoan, the capture of Chapu and the capture of Woosung.

He was promoted to Colonel in 1842, Major-General in 1854 and Lieutenant-General in 1860. In 1861 he was given the colonelcy of the 49th (Princess Charlotte of Wales's) (Hertfordshire) Regiment of Foot which he held until his death. He was made full General on 13 March 1868.

He died at his home in Ryde, Isle of Wight. He had married Elizabeth, the daughter of Samuel Delpratt of Bath. They had no children.

Military offices
Preceded by Sir Edward Bowater	Colonel of the 49th (Princess of Wales Hertfordshire) Regiment; 1861–1871	Succeeded by Thomas James Galloway
