= USS Barnes =

USS Barnes may refer to the following ships of the United States Navy:

- USS Barnes (CVE-7), an escort carrier transferred to the Royal Navy in 1942
- USS Barnes (CVE-20), an escort carrier

== See also ==
- USS Doyle C. Barnes
- USS Robert L. Barnes
