= Barne Barne =

British land-owner and Member of Parliament

Barne Barne (25 August 1754 – 19 June 1828) was a British land-owner and a Member of Parliament for the Pocket Borough of Dunwich, in Suffolk, between 1777 and 1791. Barne's father had established himself as co-proprietor of the Borough and controlled one seat; on his father's death in 1777, Barne's eldest brother declined to fill the vacancy and so Barne accepted the offer, hoping to obtain, by voting with the administration, a paid office. He was eventually offered a post, as a Commissioner of Taxes, and, on accepting it, resigned his seat in 1791.

== Early life and legal career ==
Barne was born on 25 August 1754, the second son of Miles Barne of Sotterley, a Member of Parliament for Dunwich, and his second wife, Mary Thornhill, daughter of George Thornhill of Diddington, Huntingdonshire.

He was educated at Westminster School in 1768 and then admitted at Trinity Hall, Cambridge, in 1772, matriculating that year and becoming a scholar in 1773. He received an LL.B. in 1780 and was a fellow of Trinity Hall from 1781 to 1814. Prior to his education, he was admitted at the Inner Temple in 1770 and then called to the Bar later, in 1779. A Bencher in 1811 and Reader 1820, he was the Treasurer from 1820 to 1821.

== Member of Parliament ==
Dunwich was a Parliamentary constituency in Suffolk, which had largely fallen into the sea and had a dwindling population by the late eighteenth century; it was home to roughly 40 voters. Thus, the two seats belonging to the Borough were essentially controlled by local land-lords; by 1764, it was in the hands of the Barne and Vanneck families, who were co-proprietors of the parish. Barne Barne, having begun his training as a barrister, was therefore returned for Dunwich "on the family interest" in 1777, when his father resigned, due to his declining health and advanced age, and his eldest brother, Miles Barne declined the seat.

As a Member, Barne tended to vote with the administration, hoping to secure himself a commission of some kind; he is not known to have spoken in debate. In 1788, he petitioned Pitt for this, and supported him silently in the hope of a reward. Having been returned again in 1790, Barne was offered the position of a Commissioner of Taxes in 1791 and resigned from the House.

== Later life ==
He appears to have developed a reputation for aggressively working in his family's favour in Dunwich, in his attempt to further their interest there. He offered his resignation from the Tax office in 1818 and it was accepted in 1820.

He died, unmarried, on 19 June 1828.

Parliament of Great Britain
Preceded by Miles Barne; Gerard William Vanneck	Member of Parliament for Dunwich; 1777–1791; With: Sir Gerard Vanneck, Bt to 1790; Lord Huntingfield from 1790	Succeeded by Lord Huntingfield; Miles Barne
