= Miles Barne (politician born 1718) =

English land-owner and Member of Parliament

Miles Barne (October 1718 – 27 December 1780) was an English land-owner and a Member of Parliament for Dunwich between 1747 and 1754, and again between 1764 and 1777. Born into a family long associated with London merchant circles, Barne accumulated sufficient wealth to purchase an estate in Suffolk and became prominent amongst local freeman. Dunwich in Suffolk, his constituency, was a pocket borough, controlled by the Downing land-owning family; Barne, the local Vanneck family and the freemen of the borough slowly ousted the Downings' influence and Barne established himself as one of the town's new members, which gave his family the seat until it was abolished in the 1832 Reforms.

== Early life ==
Born in October 1718, Barne was the only son of Miles Barne, a London merchant and a Director of the East India Company who was the great-grandson of the MP Sir William Barne. His mother was Elizabeth, daughter of Solomon Snowdon, of York.

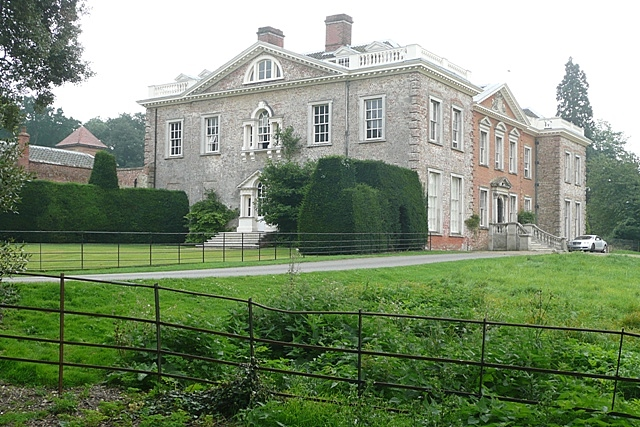
Sotterley Hall, the home which Barne purchased in 1744.

== Member of Parliament ==
The family had long been merchants in London and Miles Barne had accumulated enough funds to purchase a country estate in Suffolk which he did, in 1744, buying lands at Sotterley in that county; his 1745 marriage to the heiress of Nathaniel Elwick also secured him an inheritance in Kent, should he have issue.

Meanwhile, the "Rotten Borough" of Dunwich in Suffolk was effectively under the control of the local land-owner (see Pocket Borough), Sir George Downing, 3rd Bt., who attempted to have returned to Parliament his cousin and heir, Sir Jacob Downing, 4th Bt., as the second Member of Parliament for the seat; however, the local freemen disagreed and they asked Miles Barne, who had recently purchased his estate, to stand at the next election as their representative. He was returned in 1747 along with Sir George and was listed as a supporter of the Government, but Sir Jacob was able to reaffirm his control over the borough after Sir George's death in 1749 and won back the seat in the following election (1754), when Barne was not returned; however Barne continued to exert influence in the area, being patron of the Parish of Sotterley from 1758, meanwhile Elwick's death in 1750 also brought his estates to Barne. He promised that, if he were still alive after Downing's death, he would contest the seat again.

When Downing died in 1764, the freemen once again offered the seat to Barne, who agreed with the Vannecks (also a family of former merchants who had purchased a seat in Suffolk) to be joint patrons of the borough, thus ousting the Downing influence. Barne was elected in 1764 and served until 1777, voting infrequently, but usually with the Government, and listed as a friend of the Newcastle and Rockingham ministries; he resigned in 1777, citing ill health. His efforts helped to secure for the Barne family a stake in the seat and four of his sons and a grandson (Frederick Barne) would be returned as members of the seat from that time up to 1832.

== Family and later life ==
Barne was married twice: firstly, in May 1745, to Elizabeth Elwick, daughter and heir of Nathaniel Elwick of Crayford, Kent, a Governor of Madras; she died on 20 September 1747 and Barne married, secondly, on 23 September 1752, Mary Thornhill, a daughter of George Thornhill of Diddington, Huntingdonshire, and his wife Sarah Barne, daughter of John Barne of London and of Kirkby, Lincolnshire.

With his first wife, he had the following children:

- Miles Barne (1746–1825) was a Member of Parliament for Dunwich from 1791 to 1796.
- Elizabeth Elwick Barne (d. 1759) she died childless on 24 June 1759.

With his second wife, he had the following children:

- Barne Barne (1754–1828) was a barrister, Commissioner of Taxes and a Member of Parliament for Dunwich from 1777 to 1791.
- Snowdon Barne (1756–1825) was a barrister, Deputy Chairman of the Custom Board and a Member of Parliament for Dunwich from 1796 to 1812.
- Lieutenant-Colonel Michael Barne (1759–1837) was an Army officer and a Member of Parliament for Dunwich from 1812 to 1830.
- The Reverend Thomas Barne FSA (d. 1834). Educated at Westminster School and then from 1783 Oriel College, Oxford, where he received a BA in 1786 and proceeded to MA in 1789. He was appointed King's Chaplain-in-Ordinary and Rector of Sotterley in 1790 and was also a Fellow of the Society of Antiquaries of London. He married twice: firstly, to Elizabeth Wyatt, daughter of Richard Wyatt of Milton Place, Egham; she died in 1812 without issue; secondly, he married, on 14 March 1815, Sarah St. John, only daughter of the Hon. and Very Rev. St. Andrew St. John, Dean of Worcester; she was born on 6 January 1770. He died on 22 July 1834, aged 68, and was succeeded as Chaplain by the Rev. Vane Russell.
- Mary Barne. She married, on 21 November 1777, William Sawbridge of East Haddon, Northamptonshire, the eldest son of Henry Sawbrige (1719–1806) and his wife, Elizabeth, daughter of Thomas Sikes of London. He was a gentleman, who purchased in 1807 St. Andrew Manor from the Lord St. John. He died on 11 October 1836, leaving one son, Henry Barne Sawbridge, D.L. and J.P. for Northamptonshire and Recorder for Daventry from 1803–1821.
- Sarah Barne (d. 7 January 1818). She married John Harding (d. 10 Aug 1819), of Clynderwen, near Llandissilio, Carmarthenshire and Pembrokeshire.
- Elizabeth Barne (d. 1834).
- Anne Barne (d. 1827). She married Lt.-Col. Charles Drake Garrard of Lamer Park, Hertfordshire, (d. 1817) the fourth son of William Drake and heir of his cousin Sir Benet Garrard, 6th Baronet, whose estate he inherited, albeit without the baronetcy; he was born Charles Drake and was the MP for Amersham from 1796 to 1805. Together, they had one son and five daughters; the son being Charles Benet Drake-Garrard, while one of their daughters, Charlotte, married George Henry Cherry, MP for Dunwich from 1820 to 1826. Anne Barne died in January 1827.

Miles Barne died on 27 December 1780. His estates passed to his eldest son, Miles Barne.

Parliament of Great Britain
Preceded by Sir George Downing, Bt. Jacob Downing	Member of Parliament for Dunwich; 1747–1754; With: Sir George Downing, Bt. 1747–49; Sir Jacob Downing, Bt 1749–54	Succeeded by Sir Jacob Downing, Bt; Soame Jenyns
Preceded by Eliab Harey; Sir Jacob Downing, Bt	Member of Parliament for Dunwich; 1762–1777; With: Eliab Harvey 1764-68; Gerard William Vanneck from 1768	Succeeded by Gerard William Vanneck; Barne Barne
