= Frederick Barne =

English landowner and politician

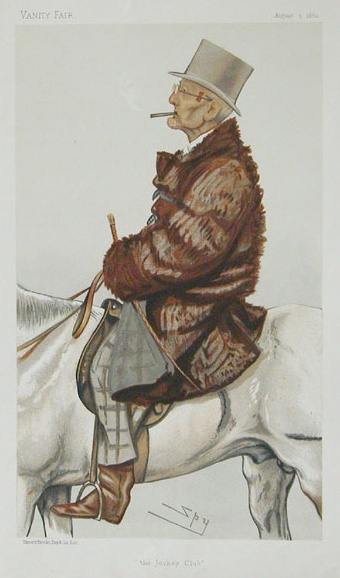
- Barne as caricatured by Spy (Leslie Ward) in Vanity Fair, August 1882

Member of Parliament for Dunwich
- In office 1830–1832
- Preceded by: Michael Barne
- Succeeded by: Constituency abolished

Personal details
- Born: 8 November 1801
- Died: 9 March 1886 (aged 84)

Frederick Barne (8 November 1805 – 9 March 1886) was an English landowner and politician who sat in the House of Commons from 1830 to 1832.

Barne was the only son of Lieutenant-Colonel Michael Barne and Mary Boucherett, daughter of Ayscoghe Boucherett. He served as a captain in the 12th Royal Lancers. In 1830, he was elected Member of Parliament for the rotten borough of Dunwich, succeeding his father as MP. He held the seat until 1832, when it was abolished under the Reform Act 1832 (2 & 3 Will. 4. c. 45). He lived at Sotterley HalI and served as High Sheriff of Suffolk in 1851.

In 1834, Barne married Mary Anne Elizabeth Honywood, the eldest daughter of Sir John Courtenay Honywood, 5th Baronet. Their son, Frederick St John Barne, later served as Member of Parliament for East Suffolk.

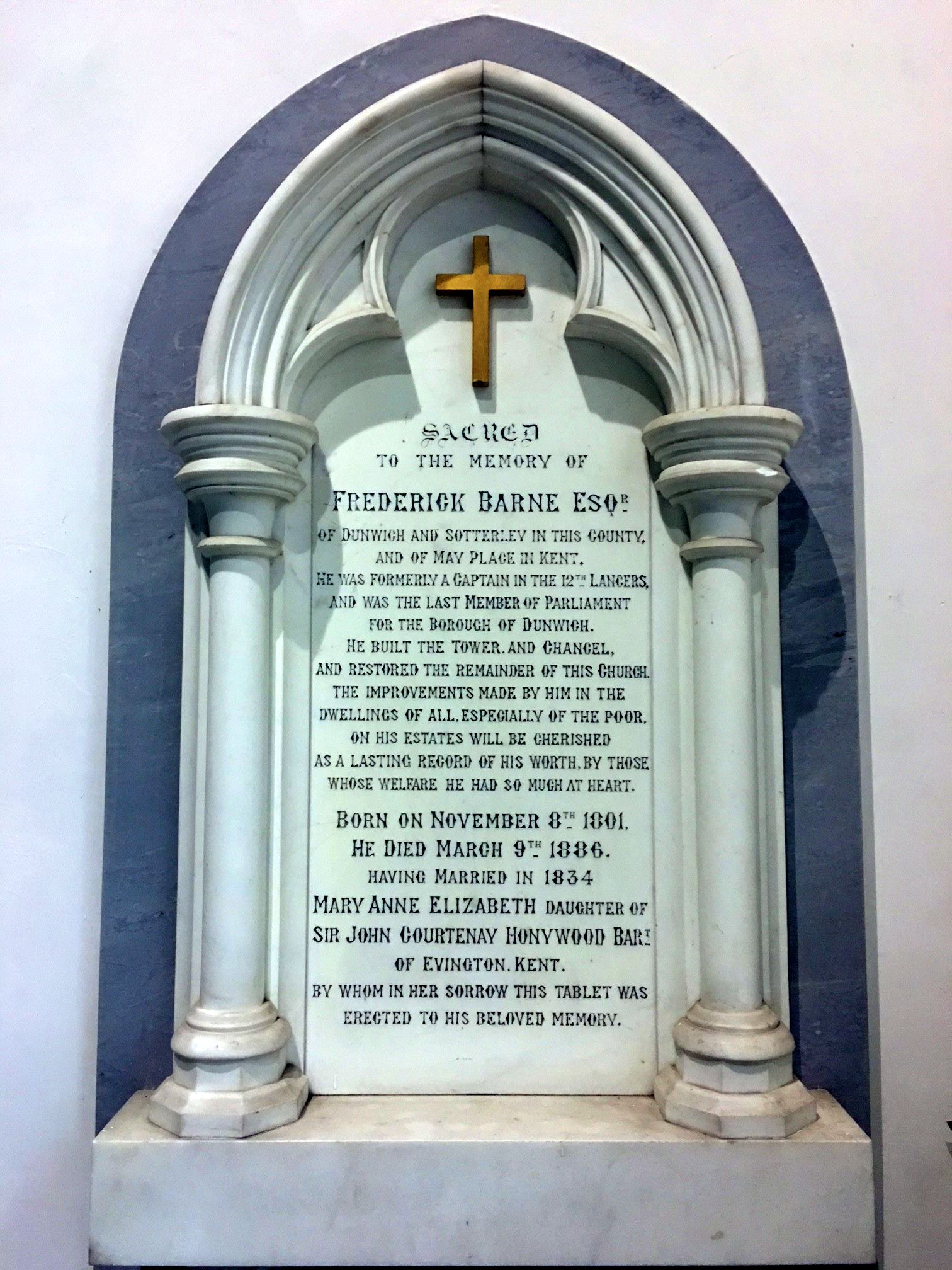
Frederick Barne memorial in St James's Church, Dunwich

Parliament of the United Kingdom
Preceded by Michael Barne; Andrew Arcedeckne	Member of Parliament for Dunwich; 1830–1832; With: Andrew Arcedeckne 1830–31; Earl of Brecknock 1831–32; Viscount Lowther 1832	Constituency abolished See East Suffolk
Honorary titles
Preceded by Sir Thomas Rokewode-Gage	High Sheriff of Suffolk; 1851	Succeeded by James Hamilton Lloyd-Anstruther
