= Heveningham Hall =

Country house in Heveningham, Suffolk, England

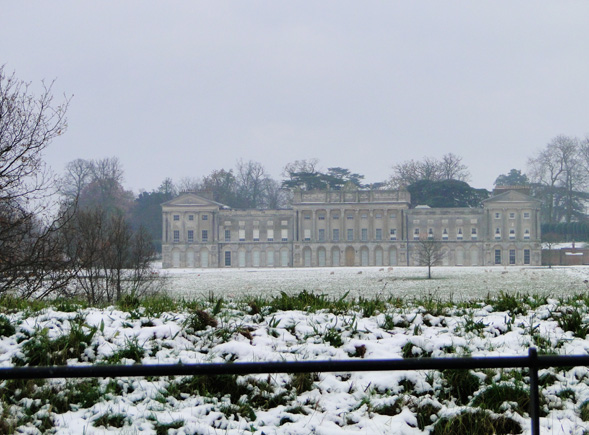
- Heveningham Hall

- Location within Suffolk
- 52°18′31″N 1°26′50″E
- Type: Country House

History
- Built: 1778–1780 (exteriors); 1781–1784 (interiors)

Site notes
- Architect(s): Robert Taylor (exteriors) and James Wyatt (interiors)
- Architectural style: Palladian
- Owner: Jon Hunt

Listed Building – Grade I
- Official name: Heveningham Hall
- Designated: 25 October 1951
- Reference no.: 1183040

Heveningham Hall is a Grade I listed building in Heveningham, Suffolk, England. The first house on the site was built for the politician and regicide William Heveningham in 1658. The present house, dating from 1778 to 1780, was designed by Sir Robert Taylor for Sir Gerard Vanneck, 2nd Baronet with interiors by James Wyatt. The hall remained in the Vanneck family until 1981.

After a period of decline and uncertainty about the future of the hall in the 20th century, it was purchased in 1994 by the billionaire property entrepreneur Jon Hunt. Hunt has since spent considerable sums of money on both the house and ground including the implementation of plans by Capability Brown for 500 acres (200 ha) of parkland and lakes that had never been realised. Various events are now held in the grounds each year, and parts of the grounds are integrated into the adjacent 5,000 acres (2,000 ha) Wilderness Reserve, also owned by Hunt.

== History ==
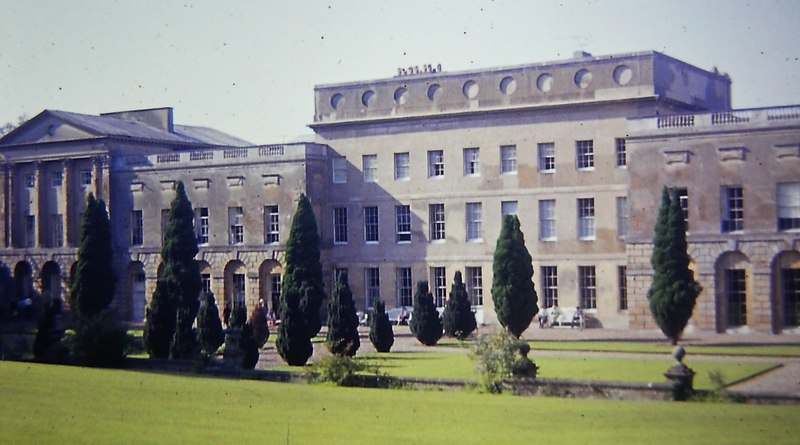
Heveningham Hall in 1967

The first house on the site was built for William Heveningham in 1658 and it stood for about 60 years before being rebuilt by John Bence in 1714. Dutch-born banker Joshua Vanneck bought the estate in 1752 and acquired more land. Vanneck's son Gerard Vanneck inherited the estate in 1777 and immediately commissioned Robert Taylor to rebuild the house again with further work to complete the East Wing from James Wyatt. Capability Brown produced designs for the gardens in 1782, but died before they could be implemented and only a few elements were constructed at the time. During the 19th century some of the gardens were remodelled, but the house remained largely unchanged. The estate remained in the hands of the Vanneck family, being the married home of The Hon. Andrew Vanneck and Louise Timpson, until shortly after the death of William Vanneck, 5th Baron Huntingfield; however, the house fell into disrepair during the first half of the 20th century and was further damaged by a fire in the dining room in 1947.

On inheriting the property, Margite Wheeler offered the Hall to the nation in 1965. It was acquired in 1969 by English Heritage and was repaired and sold in 1977 (or 1981) without the contents, which remained in the English Heritage collection. It was bought by Abdul Amir Al-Ghazzi, an Iraqi businessman, via a Swiss-registered company with conditions that certain works would be carried out on the property. A few years later the building suffered another major fire which gutted the East Wing and questions were asked in the House of Lords in 1987 about the state of the building and when it would be open to the public. A 1991 debate in the House of Lords noted the deterioration of the hall, with one speaker describing it as being in 'a deplorable state', with concerns also being raised about the current ownership being impossible to determine due to use of bearer shares and that it was therefore impossible to verify whether renovations that were a condition of the 1981 sale were carried out. Following the death of Al-Ghazzi in 1991, the estate was left in the hands of the receiver. Questions were again asked in the House of Lords about the hall and the terms of the 1981 sale. The house, together with 467 acres (189 ha) of land was soon put up for sale at £4.5 million by the Department for the Environment, despite a campaign to have it retained in public ownership as allowed by the terms of the 1981 sale.

After being on the market for 3 years, the hall and grounds were bought in 1994 by current owner and Foxtons founder Jon Hunt and his wife for use as a family home. By 2003 it was reported that Hunt had spent £1m on renovations to the hall. Since the 1990s the Hunts have also returned 510 acres (210 ha) of the grounds using Capability Brown's original – but never implemented – designs, working with the noted English landscape architect Kim Wilkie. Restoring Brown's vision required Wilkie and Hunt to remove modern features inconsistent with an 18th-century design. Numerous concrete roads, car parks, telegraph poles and farm outbuildings were either demolished or buried. Hunt has purchased additional land around the hall, including the 4,500 acre estate of Sibton Park, and is developing the whole area as Wilderness Reserve, which combines high-end holiday accommodation in a number of buildings with the rewilding of much of the land.

== The estate ==
The estate features an orangery, which is Grade I listed in its own right, as well as a Grade II* listed temple.

The main entrance gates to the estate feature two lodges with pyramid roofs which are also Grade II* listed and are connected to the main house by an underground passage.

== Events ==
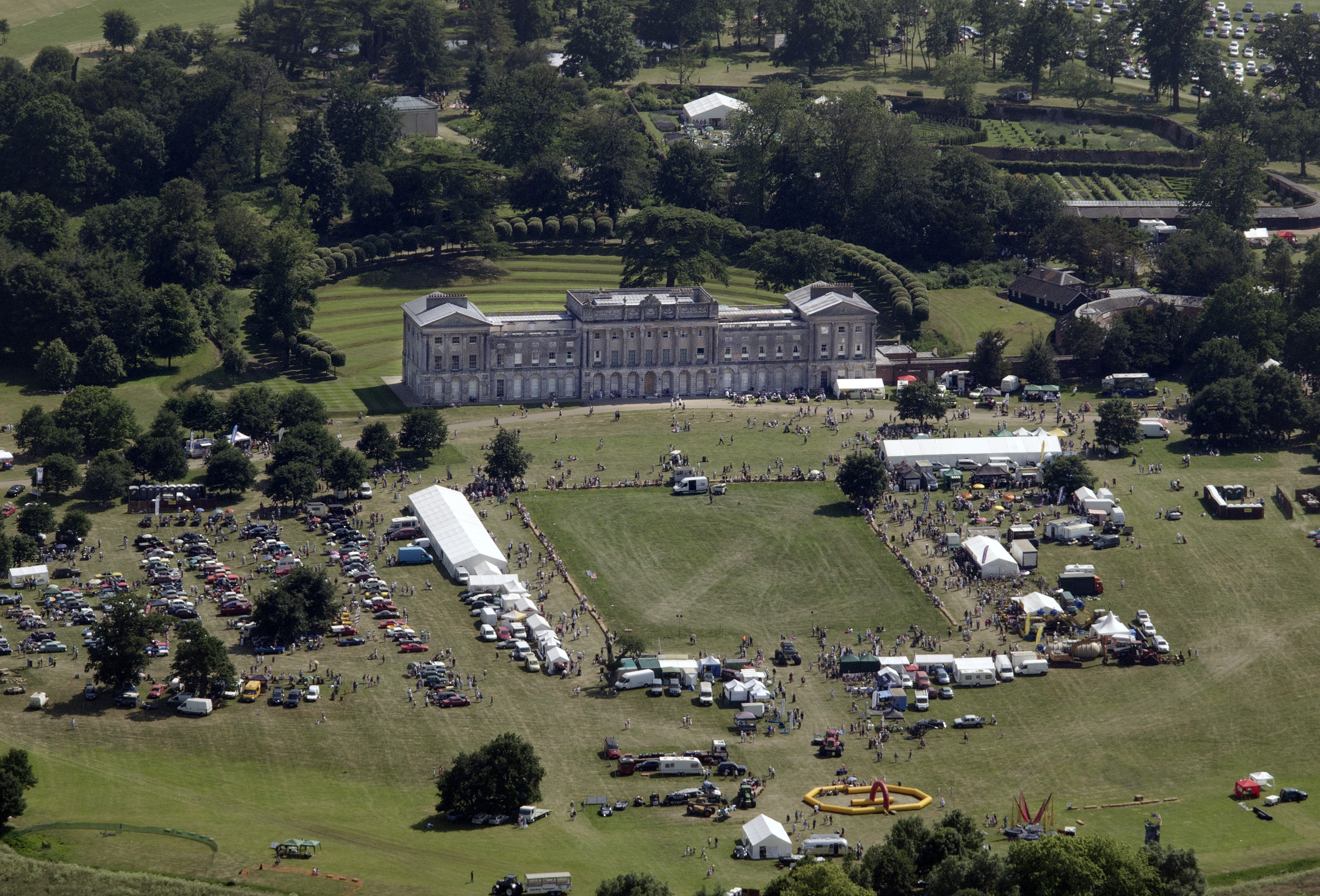
An aerial view of the 2013 country fair

The hall hosts an annual motorsport and classic car event since 2016, the Heveningham Hall Concours d'Elegance. The hall is also the location of the annual Heveningham Hall Country Fair, which raises money for local charity causes through the Heveningham Hall Country Fair Trust.
