= Gerard Vanneck =

British merchant and Member of Parliament

Sir Gerard William Vanneck, 2nd Baronet (12 September 1743 – 23 May 1791) was a British merchant and Member of Parliament.

== History ==
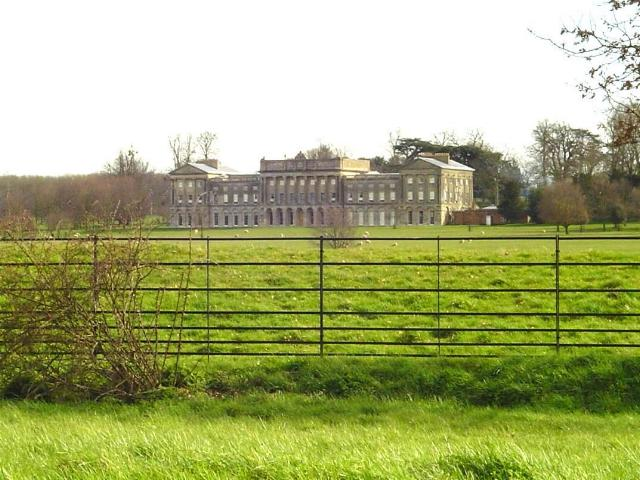
Heveningham Hall

Vanneck was the eldest son of Sir Joshua Vanneck, 1st Baronet, and his wife, Mary Anne Daubuz. His father was a successful London merchant who had emigrated to Great Britain from the Netherlands in 1722.

He was elected to the House of Commons for Dunwich in 1768, a seat he held until 1790. In 1777 he succeeded his father as second Baronet and promptly commissioned the building of Heveningham Hall in Suffolk.

Vanneck died, unmarried, in May 1791 and was succeeded in the baronetcy by his younger brother Joshua, who was elevated to the peerage as Baron Huntingfield in 1796.

Parliament of Great Britain
Preceded by Eliab Harvey; Miles Barne	Member of Parliament for Dunwich; 1768–1790; With: Miles Barne 1768–77; Barne Barne 1777–90	Succeeded by Barne Barne; Joshua Vanneck
Baronetage of Great Britain
Preceded by Joshua Vanneck	Baronet (of Putney); 1777–1791	Succeeded by Joshua Vanneck
