= Barnes (given name) =

Barnes is a masculine given name borne by:

- Barnes Compton (1830–1898), American planter and politician
- Barnes Murphy (born 1947), Irish Gaelic footballer
- Barnes Ratwatte (1883–1957), Sri Lankan Sinhala legislator and headman
- Barnes Ratwatte II (died 2004), Sri Lankan Sinhala judge
- Barnes Wallis (1887–1979), English scientist, engineer and inventor
