= Sir Joshua Vanneck, 1st Baronet =

British-Dutch merchant

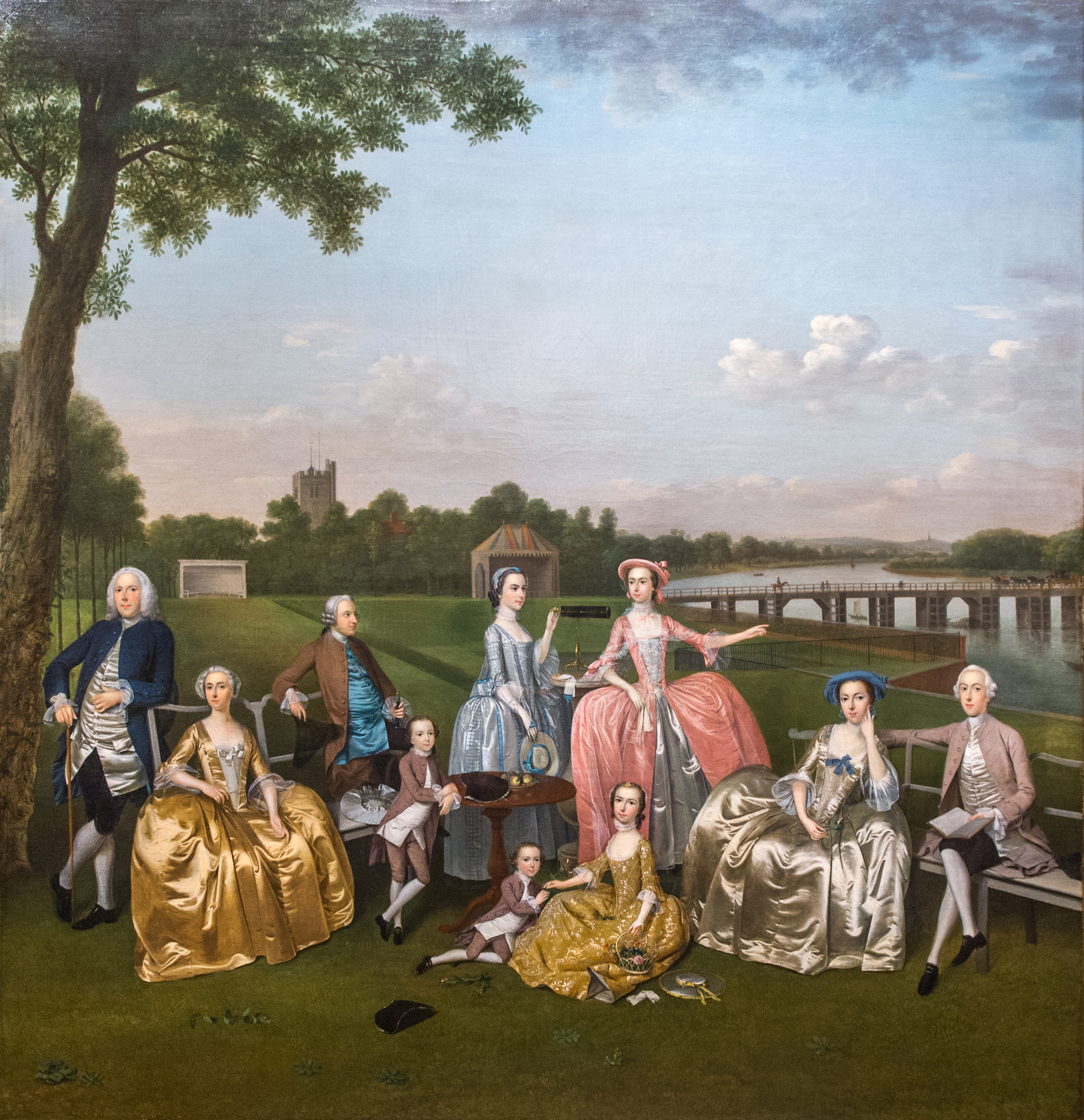
A portrait of Vanneck and his family

Sir Joshua Vanneck, 1st Baronet (1702 – 6 March 1777) was a British-Dutch merchant.

Vanneck was born in The Hague, the son of Cornelius Van Neck. He emigrated to Britain in 1722 and became a successful London merchant. This enabled him to purchase the estate of Heveningham Hall in Suffolk. In 1751 he was created a Baronet, of Putney in the County of Surrey. Vanneck married Mary Anne Daubuz, Huguenot, daughter of Stephen Daubuz, in 1732. He died in March 1777 and was succeeded in the baronetcy by his eldest son Gerard. His second son Joshua jr was raised to the Irish peerage as Baron Huntingfield in 1796.

Baronetage of Great Britain
New creation	Baronet (of Putney); 1751–1777	Succeeded by Gerard Vanneck
