= Sibton Park =

Country house in Sibton, Suffolk, England

Coordinates: 52°16′44″N 1°28′50″E

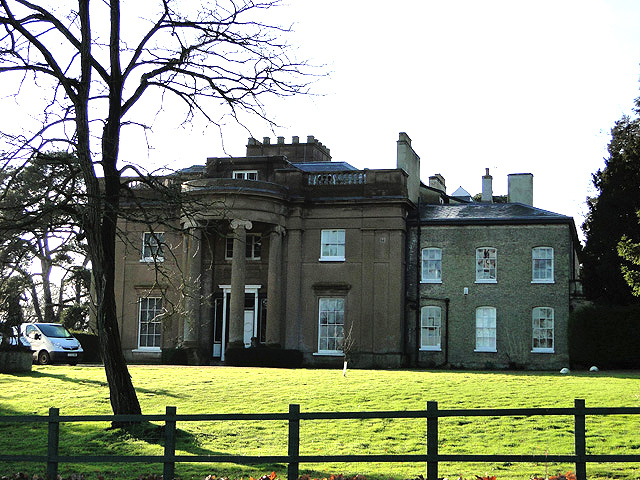
Sibton Park in 2011

Sibton Park is a Grade II* listed country house in Sibton, Suffolk, England. It was built in 1827 by Decimus Burton and is now part of the 5,000 acre Wilderness Reserve and owned by Jon Hunt.

== History ==
The Queen Anne style house that originally stood on the site was replaced by the current house, built in 1827 of brick with a stucco finish to a design by Decimus Burton

Built for Robert Sayer, once Sheriff of Suffolk, the house was purchased by John Brooke (1794-1878), a partner in 'John Brooke and Sons Ltd', wool cloth manufacturers of Huddersfield in 1844 and remained in the Brooke family until 2005, the residence of John William Brooke (1824–1881), John Kendall Brooke (1856–1939), John Acton Brooke (1883–1982), Edward Acton Brooke (1918–2006) and John Kendall Acton Brooke.

The house together with the 4,500 acre estate was acquired by British billionaire Jon Hunt, and was extended by Kim Wilkie and Argus Gathorne-Hardy. An orangery, which can hold 200 people has been added. Since 2014 it has beene available for visits by up to 24 people as part of the Wilderness Reserve.

== Architecture ==
The two-storey brick building has a slate roof. The symmetrical facade has three-bays with pilasters on either side of the entrance. The portico has ionic columns. Inside the building several of the rooms plaster friezes and marble fireplaces. A heated swimming pool, gym and tennis courts have been added.

The red brick single storey stable block was built around 1830. It has flanking wings around a courtyard and a slate roof. Above the roof is a clock tower and small bellcote. There are several other buildings on the estate which are also available to rent.

== The Estate ==
The estate attached to the house covers 4,500 acres (1,800 ha).
