= Barnes Lake (Minnesota) =

Lake in the state of Minnesota, United States

- Location within Minnesota
- Location: Carver County, Minnesota
- Coordinates: 44°46′30″N 93°53′44″W
- Etymology: William Barnes

Barnes Lake is a lake in Carver County, Minnesota, in the United States.

Barnes Lake was named for William Barnes, a pioneer settler.

== See also ==
- List of lakes in Minnesota
