= Miles Barne (politician born 1746) =

British Member of Parliament

Miles Barne (22 May 1746 – 8 September 1825) was a British Member of Parliament for Dunwich, a Pocket Borough in the county of Suffolk, between 1791 and 1796 and High Sheriff of Suffolk from 1790 to 1791. Barne's father had established himself as co-proprietor of the Borough and controlled one seat; on his father's death, Barne declined to fill the vacancy, and so it went to his younger brother instead. However, in 1791, his brother resigned and Barne reluctantly took up the seat, serving until 1796.

== Early life and legal career ==
Barne was the first son of Miles Barne of Sotterley, a Member of Parliament for Dunwich, and the only with his first wife, Elizabeth Elwick, daughter of Nathaniel Elwick of May Place, Kent, a Governor of Madras. He was admitted at Peterhouse, Cambridge in 1762 and matriculated in 1763, before being admitted to Lincoln's Inn in 1764.

== Member of Parliament ==
Dunwich was a Parliamentary constituency in Suffolk, which had largely fallen into the sea and had a dwindling population by the late eighteenth century; it was home to roughly 40 voters. Thus, the voters could be compelled by their land-lords to vote for the land-lord's favoured candidate. The Barne family, who had their seat in Sotterley, near Beccles, in Suffolk, had become the leading co-proprietors of Dunwich (along with the Vanneck family) and so controlled the vote. When Barne's father, Miles, had resigned from the seat in 1777, Barne declined to take it up and his brother, Barne Barne, served instead.

However, his brother's ambition and service was driven by his desire for an office and, when he was appointed a Tax Commissioner in 1791, the seat became vacant. With Miles Barne now having little choice, he was returned as Dunwich's Member of Parliament in 1791. He had reluctantly accepted the post of High Sheriff for 1790–91 and much preferred the living of a country squire than a public servant. Despite being recorded as a supporter of Pitt, he took up the role with little activity and is only recorded voting on a handful of occasions during his five years as M.P. After Parliament's dissolution at the end of 1795, he retired on health grounds.

== Later life ==
Unlike his kin, he was motivated neither by political service, nor reward. He did not ask, and did not receive, any offices or sinecures for his time as an M.P. Even as a squire, he was content to leave the business of the family's estate to his half-brothers. According to his obituary, in the Gentleman's Magazine, he spent the years after retiring from politics "almost constantly at Sotterley, in retirement, seeing very few persons except his near connections and relations."

He died, unmarried, on 8 September 1825 and his estate passed to his half-brother, Barne Barne.

Parliament of Great Britain
| Preceded by Barne Barne; Lord Huntingfield | Member of Parliament for Dunwich; 1791–1796; With: Lord Huntingfield | Succeeded by Lord Huntingfield; Snowdon Barne |
