= Denford Park =

Country house and estate in Berkshire, England

Coordinates: 51°25′15″N 1°28′56″W

Denford Park is a country house, surrounding estate and village in the English county of Berkshire, within the civil parish of Kintbury.

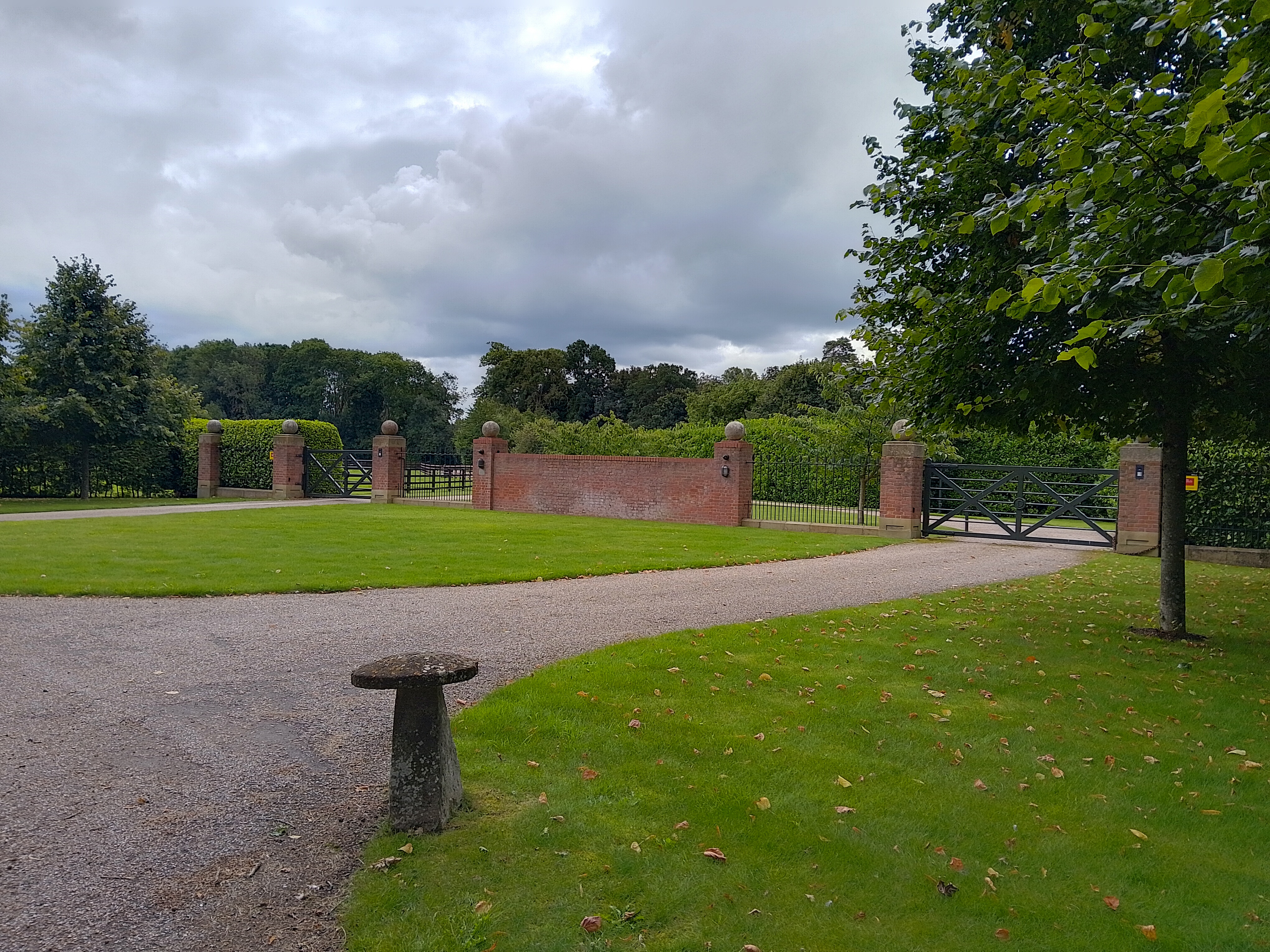
Entrance to the estate.

The village lies near to the A4 road, and is located approximately 1.5 miles (2.4 km) north-east of Hungerford. Denford House was extended in 1832 for George Henry Cherry who bought it from William Hallett Esq the original owner, being designed by the architect, Jeffery Wyattville. It was the home of Apsley Cherry-Garrard, the Antarctic explorer. Between 1967 and 2002, the building housed Norland College.

In 2002, Denford Park was purchased by Faisal bin Salman bin Abdulaziz Al Saud and is the location of his Denford Stud.
