= George Frederick Cherry =

George Frederick Cherry (1761–1799) was a British-born political officer of the East India Company, murdered in Benares by Wazir Ali Khan as part of a minor insurrection against the British.

== Biography ==
George Frederick Cherry was born in 1761 in Gillingham, Kent, the first-born of Susan Cherry (née Curtis) and George Cherry (who in 1785 became chairman of the Victualling Board) in a family of ten children. He married Martha Maria Paul (1765-1819). Their only son, George Henry Cherry (1793-1848) was Member of Parliament for the rotten borough of Dunwich from 1820-1826.

He was the British Resident at Lucknow until 1796, immediately prior to the period in which Wazir Ali Khan was removed as Nawab of Awadh by the British and replaced by Saadat Ali Khan II. The role of a resident extended to intelligence gathering, and at this, in the relative turbulence of late 18th century Awadh, Cherry excelled, running a network of spies and informers - such as Mirza Abu Taleb Khan, who wrote about some of his interactions with the East India Company.

=== Massacre of Benares ===
He had made sufficient enemies in Lucknow by 1796 that he was relocated to Benares, considered a less exposed town, to act as political-agent to the Governor General. In 1797 Wazir Ali Khan was deposed and required by the British to live in Benares with a pension. The young Ali - only 19 - was far from satisfied with his lot, and indications before 1799, and evidence of later enquiries suggests he was plotting against the British and with a view to regaining his lost position. By 1799, the British had come to the conclusion that Ali should be required to live in Calcutta - further from his power-base, and much more obviously under the eye of the British. It fell to Cherry to impart this news.

Ali appears to have been informed of his fate in the early part of January 1799, and his remonstrances fell on deaf ears. Appearing to acquiesce to the situation, he gave it out that he would relocate on the 15 or 16 January. On 13 January Cherry was informed that Ali would visit him the following morning, and on the 14th Ali appeared at breakfast time, leading a more-or-less normal 200-strong entourage. Cherry escorted Khan and four supporters into his house. Ali took the opportunity to complain loudly about his lot, to assert promises broken by the British, and to blame Cherry for failing to look after his interests. Then, in what looked like a choreographed movement, an associate, Waris Ali, restrained the sitting Cherry from behind his seat, Wazir Ali Khan struck Cherry with his sword, and Cherry was further struck by others of Ali's party. Cherry managed to struggle out of the house, but was quickly killed. Two of Cherry's colleagues were also killed: his secretary, Mr. Evans, was stabbed, escaped outside, and was shot whilst seeking to flee; and a Captain Conway, residing with Cherry, was also killed. Two other British residents of Benares were also killed, in what came to be known as the Massacre of Benares.

Ali fled, evading capture for some months, but was eventually turned over to the British authorities by Pratap Singh of Jaipur, Rajah of Jaipur, on the condition Ali was not executed nor fettered. Ali was imprisoned for the remainder of his life.
