= Foxtons =

British estate agency company

Foxtons Group plc
- Company type: Public limited company
- Traded as: LSE: FOXT
- Industry: Estate agent; Real Estate
- Founded: 1981; 45 years ago
- Founder: Jon Hunt
- Headquarters: London, United Kingdom
- Key people: Nigel Rich (Chairman); Guy Gittins (Chief Executive Officer)
- Revenue: ▲£172.5 million (2025)
- Operating income: ▼£19.4 million (2025)
- Net income: ▼£12.8 million (2025)
- Website: www.foxtonsgroup.co.uk

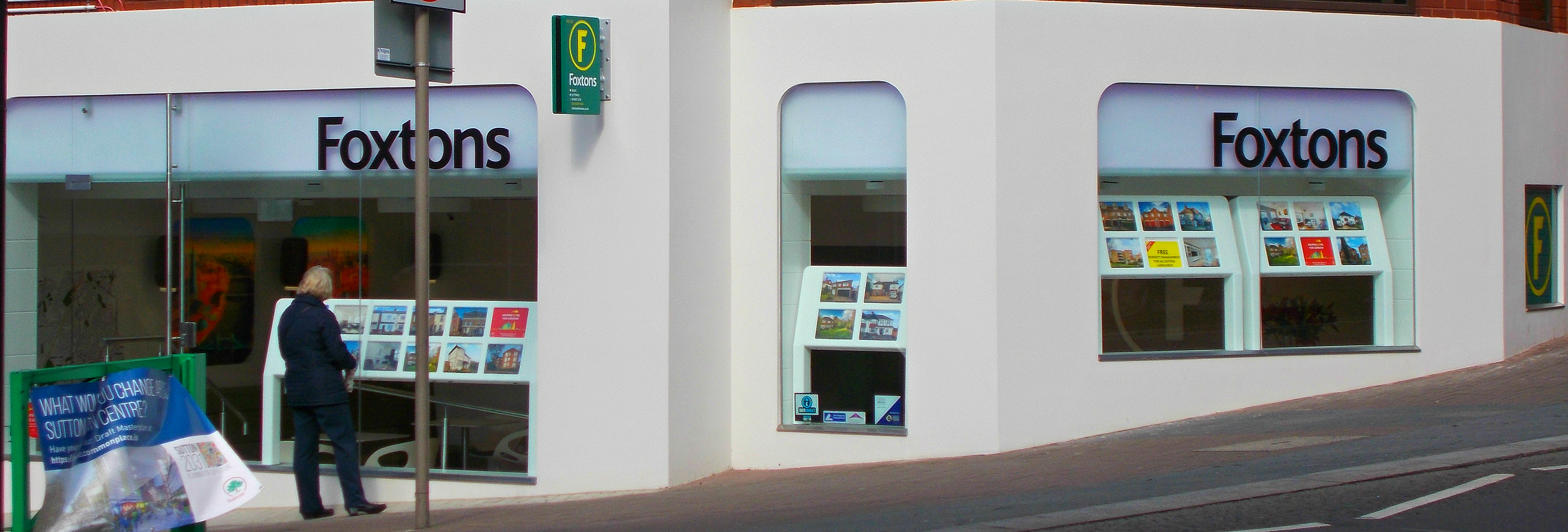
The Sutton, London branch of Foxtons

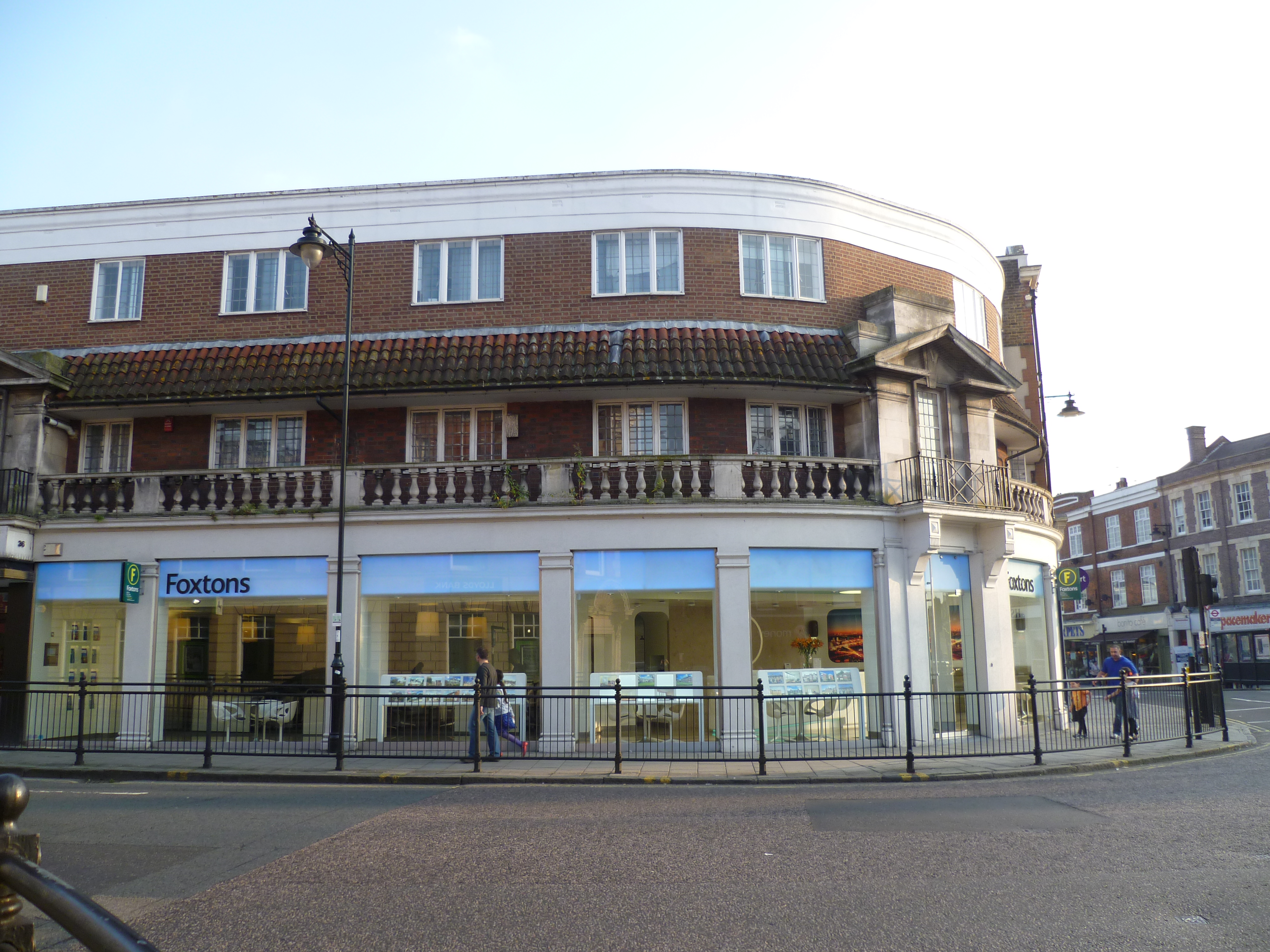
Foxtons, Enfield.

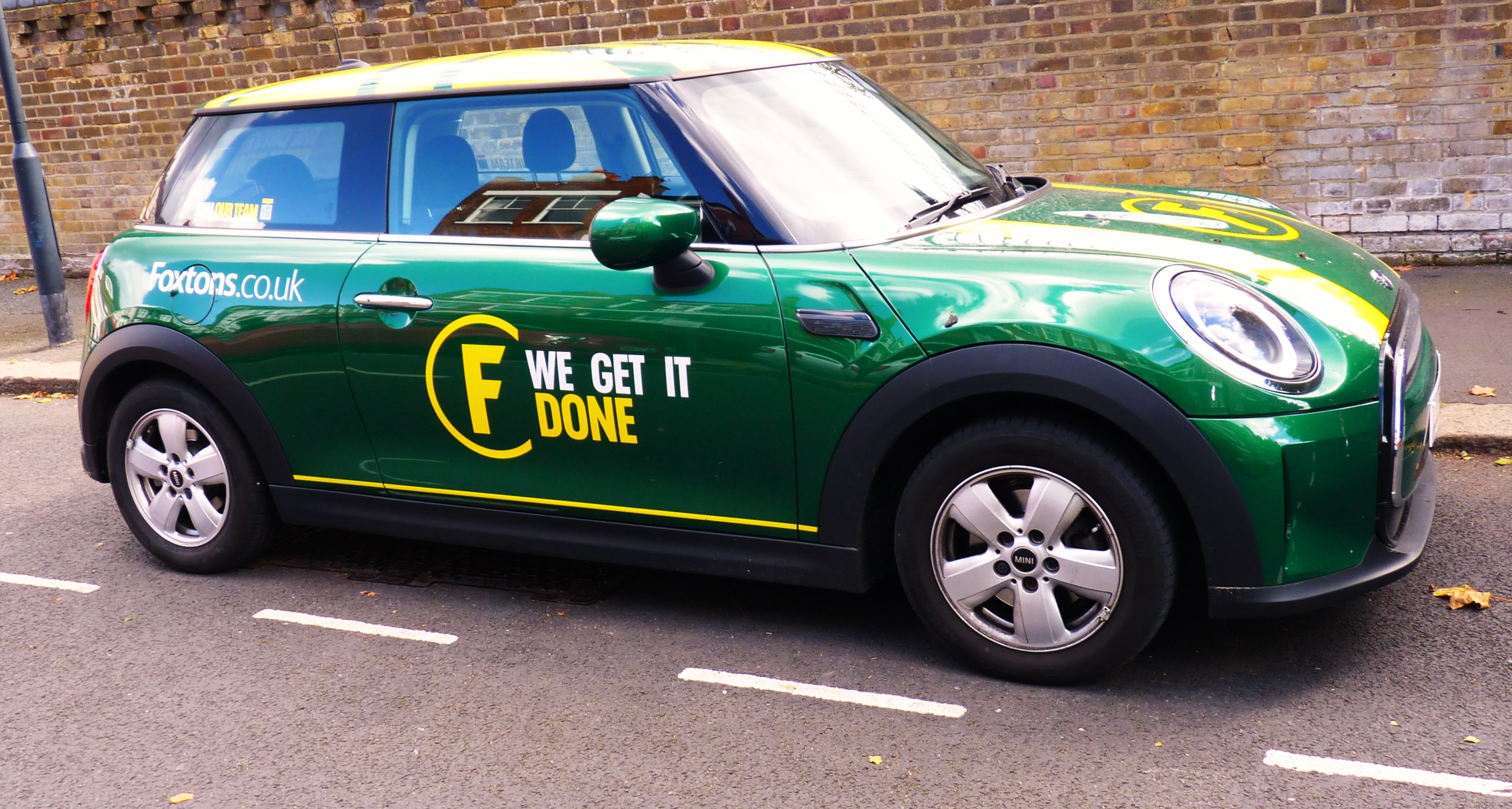
A Foxtons mini

Foxtons Group plc is a British estate agency company dealing with both lettings and sales. It is listed on the London Stock Exchange.

== History ==
Foxtons was founded by Jon Hunt in 1981 in Notting Hill, London, as a two-person estate agency.

2001 saw the launch of promotionally branded Minis, bearing the Foxtons logo.

Foxtons was acquired by private equity firm BC Partners in 2007 for £390 million.

In December 2009, private equity firm BC Partners lost control of Foxtons, less than three years after buying it, after creditors reorganised the real estate broker's debt.

On 27 August 2013, Foxtons unveiled its flotation on the London Stock Exchange to raise £55m from private investors.

On 1 July 2014, Michael Brown stepped down as CEO, citing personal reasons for his decision. Previous COO, Nic Budden took on the role of CEO.

In May 2022, Nic Budden stepped down as CEO and Peter Rollings took over as interim CEO; it was announced that Guy Gittins would take up the post on a permanent basis in September 2022.

In January 2026, it was announced that Foxtons Group had acquired the independent estate agent Cauldwell Property Services for £6.5 million. The acquisition expanded Foxtons' presence into Milton Keynes and formed part of its strategy to drive revenue growth through acquisitions, with the transaction funded alongside the group’s ongoing trading activities.

== Controversies ==
In March 2006, the BBC ran an undercover report and revealed many questionable actions taken by Foxtons employees such as faking signatures and purposefully overvaluing properties.

In May 2013, BBC Watchdog reported that Foxtons imposes tenancy agreements which demand in the small print that tenants must use utilities supplier Spark Energy Ltd. The BBC stated Foxtons are paid commission by Spark Energy Ltd.

== Operations ==
Foxtons has over 50 offices. It is a member of The Property Ombudsman, The National Association of Estate Agents (NAEA) (Licensed Member), The Association of Residential Letting Agents (ARLA) (Licensed Member), and the National Approved Letting Scheme. Foxtons is also a founding member of the Safe Agent Fully Endorsed client money protection scheme (SAFE) as well as Tenancy Deposit Scheme.
