= Sotterley =

Village in Suffolk, England

Coordinates: 52.401°N 1.610°E

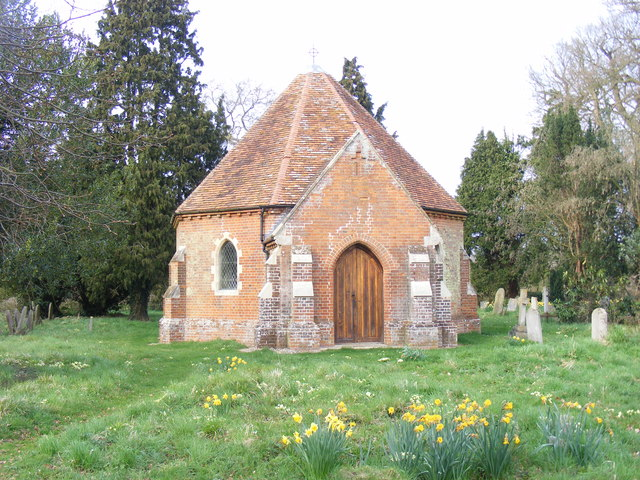
- Sotterley cemetery chapel

- Location within Suffolk
- Area: 6 km^{2} (2.3 sq mi)
- Population: 113 (2011)
  - Density: 19/km^{2} (49/sq mi)
- OS grid reference: TM454845
- District: East Suffolk
- Shire county: Suffolk
- Region: East
- Country: England
- Sovereign state: United Kingdom
- Post town: Beccles
- Postcode district: NR34
- Dialling code: 01502
- UK Parliament: Waveney

Sotterley, originally Southern-lea from its situation south of the river, is a village and civil parish in the East Suffolk district, in the English county of Suffolk, located approximately 4 miles (6 km) south-east of Beccles and 1.5 miles (2 km) east of Willingham St Mary and Shadingfield. The parish is primarily agricultural with a dispersed population of 113 at the 2011 census. The parish council operates to administer jointly the parishes of Shadingfield, Willingham St Mary, Sotterley and Ellough.

Sotterley Hall remains at the centre of the parish which now has very few basic services. A saw mill operates in the village, often making use of wood from the 160 hectares (400 acres) of mixed woodland managed by the Sotterley estate.

== History ==
At the Domesday Survey in 1086 Sotterley was known as Soterlega and was part of the estate of Earl Hugh of Chester in Wangford Hundred. The village had a population of about 21 households and was held by Mundred the Sheriff who also held the lost village of Croscroft in Wangford Hundred.

Sotterley was held by Roger de Soterley in 1242 and continued in the family until about 1470 when it was confiscated due to the family's involvement in a rebellion led by the Earl of Warwick during the Wars of the Roses. Edward IV then gave the manor to Thomas Playters. A stained glass window in Sotterley Church commemorated the death of Thomas Playters in 1479.

A descendant, also called Thomas, was High Sheriff of Suffolk in 1606 at which time the estate was valued at £2000 per annum and was the last Baron created by King James I in August 1623. In 1642 Playters' son, Sir William Playters was Member of Parliament for Oxford and Vice Admiral of Suffolk. During the Civil War Sir Lionel Playters was rector of Uggeshall and Sotterley. John Walker in chronicling the sufferings of the clergy records that when 'rebels brake open the stable doors and stole two horses' from the parsonage he challenged them, whereupon one said 'Pistoll the Parson' and two pistols were discharged at him.

In 1744 Sotterley manor was sold to Miles Barne, the son of a London merchant, who rebuilt Sotterley Hall following a fire. The parish was enclosed in 1796 leaving his son Miles Barne, with 1,085 acres (4.39 km^{2}; 1.695 mi^{2}), as the largest landholder. The Barne family still owns the house. Notable members of the Barne family to have lived at Sotterley include Frederick Barne, M.P. for the rotten borough of Dunwich at the time of the 1832 Reform Act, his son Frederick St John Newdigate Barne, M.P. for East Suffolk from 1876 to 1885 and his son Michael Barne, Royal Navy officer and the last surviving member of the 1901–04 Discovery Expedition to Antarctica.

== Geography ==
Sotterley lies on an area of clay plateau in a wider area averaging between 20 and 25 metres above sea level. The underlying rock is crag-sand with overlying glacial till deposits and clay soils. The landscape is mainly arable with Sotterley Park and its associated woodland providing the main variation. The village is dispersed around a crossroads with a road pattern of unlit lanes which is largely unchanged from that seen on Hodgkinson's map of 1783.

The census of 1801 records Sotterley had a population of 254 inhabitants. The population remained reasonably steady throughout the 19th century and stood at 221 in 1901, at which time the village school had an average attendance of 80 children. From the 1920s onwards, the population began to decline more quickly and stood at 142 by the census of 1961. The 2011 census recorded the population of the parish as 113, a reduction of seven since the census of 2001.

The village has very limited basic services today. The public house, the Falcon, closed during the 20th century. Regional Cycle Route 31, from Reedham to Southwold, passes through the village. Sotterley school, which was built in 1873 to replace a parochial school built in 1840 and supported by charitable contributions, closed in 1971. Children now attend primary school in Brampton and high school in Beccles.

== Sotterley Hall and estate ==
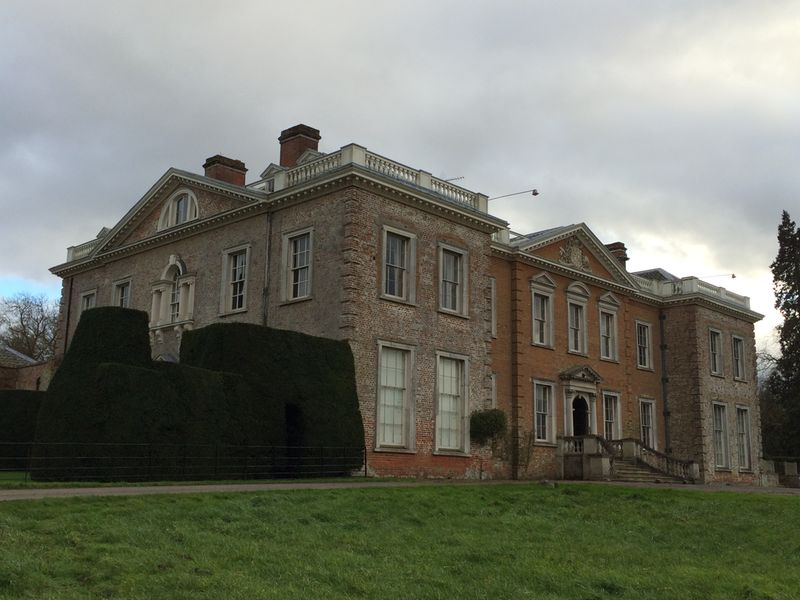
Sotterley Hall

Sotterley Estate is centred on a Georgian mansion house built in 1744, Sotterley Hall, overlooking a lake. The hall is a Grade I listed building and is H-shaped with two wings and a central facade with nine windows. A number of associated buildings close to the hall, including stables, a water tower and cowsheds, are grade II listed buildings.

The estate surrounding the house, Sotterley Park, was laid out in the 18th century and includes some ancient semi-natural woodland including pollarded oak trees and trees of significant size and age. It is believed to have previously been a medieval deer park. The majority of the estate is a Site of Special Scientific Interest of 121 hectares (300 acres). The park is particularly important in that the trees "support the richest epiphytic Lichen flora in East Anglia" with 92 species of lichen and 14 of bryophytes.

The estate is managed with a mixture of agricultural, woodland and field sports use. A 12-mile (19 km) horse trail is available on land around the estate and village. The estate has been used as a film and TV location. In 2025 the FolkEast music festival was held on the Sotterley estate. The festival was held on the 15 to 17 August and saw acts including Kathryn Tickell and The Darkening, and the Penguin Cafe Orchestra appear on the “Sunset Stage” erected between the Hall and the lake.

== Churches ==
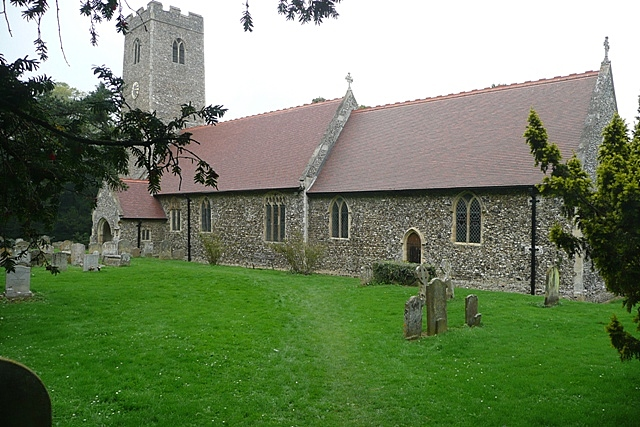
Church of St Margaret

The parish church, a Grade I listed building with many medieval elements, is located on the Sotterley estate and is dedicated to St Margaret. Access by vehicle is limited to the times of services. The church has more monumental brasses than any other in Suffolk, as well as medieval glasswork and a carved oak rood screen. Kelly's directory of 1900 notes that the church register held at the time dated from 1547. The roll of honour in the church records that 15 men from Sotterley died during World War I, including two Barnes.

The parish was consolidated in 1873 with the neighbouring parish of Willingham St Mary which had lacked a church for many years.

An unusual octagonal cemetery chapel and cemetery were established outside the estate in about 1883. The brick-built chapel is a Grade II listed building which may have been designed by Sir Arthur Blomfield. Each face of the building has a gothic window. The chapel was threatened with demolition but is now owned by the parish council and restoration was begun in 2007 by the Sotterley Chapel Preservation Trust.
