= River Yox =

River in Suffolk, England

Coordinates: 52.2646°N 1.5206°E

The Peasenhall Gull, a tributary of the River Yox, channelised at Peasenhall.

The River Yox is a river in the English county of Suffolk. It flows from the west of Peasenhall through Sibton and Yoxford where it becomes the Minsmere River. The Yox was originally fordable at Yoxford where a modern road bridge allows the A12 to cross the river.

The river valley is largely drained and used as grassland with some arable use at Sibton. Some peat deposits are present. The valley has a narrow floodplain with water meadows and has largely been drained using a system of dykes.

== Wildlife ==
As of 2018, the river at Yoxford was seen to contain sticklebacks, brown trout, frogs, newts, grass snakes, and otters. Eels were seen in 2017. Kingfishers have not been observed since 2017, nor have any water voles. Hitherto there had been a large population of water voles along a large stretch of the river, but regular predation by domestic cats has been observed. As of 2020, water voles and kingfishers have been regularly seen on a stretch of the river behind Yoxford High Street.
