= George Henry Cherry =

British Member of Parliament (1793–1848)

George Cherry

Member of Parliament for Dunwich
- In office 1820–1826

High Sheriff of Berkshire
- In office 1829–1830

Personal details
- Born: August 30, 1793
- Died: January 6, 1848 (aged 54)
- Relations: Apsley Cherry-Garrard (grandson)
- Parent: George Frederick Cherry (father)
- Occupation: Politician

George Cherry (30 August 1793 – 6 January 1848) was a Member of Parliament for Dunwich from 1820 to 1826.

Between 1829 and 1830 he was the High Sheriff of Berkshire when he was living at Denford Park.

His father, George Frederick Cherry was British Resident at Oudh, murdered by Wazir Ali Khan in 1799. One of his sons, George Cherry, was an English cricketer. Another son Major General Apsley Cherry-Garrard was the father of the polar explorer Apsley Cherry-Garrard.
