= Robert Kemp =

Robert Kemp may refer to:

== Politicians ==
- Sir Robert Kemp, 2nd Baronet (1627–1710), MP for Norfolk and Dunwich
- Sir Robert Kemp, 3rd Baronet (1667–1734), MP for Dunwich and Suffolk
- Sir Robert Kemp, 4th Baronet (1699–1752), MP for Orford
- Robert Kemp (Canadian politician), politician in the Legislative Assembly of Ontario

== Others ==
- Robert Kemp (literary critic) (1878–1959), French literary critic
- Robert Kemp (playwright) (1908–1967), Scottish playwright
- Robert S. Kemp, professor of finance
- Robert G. Kemp (1928–1988), Canadian painter
- Bobby Kemp (1959–1998), American football player
- Robert "Father" Kemp, founder of the Old Folks Concerts

== See also ==
- Robert Kempe (c. 1526–1571), MP
