= Ralph Knight =

English soldier and politician (1619–1691)

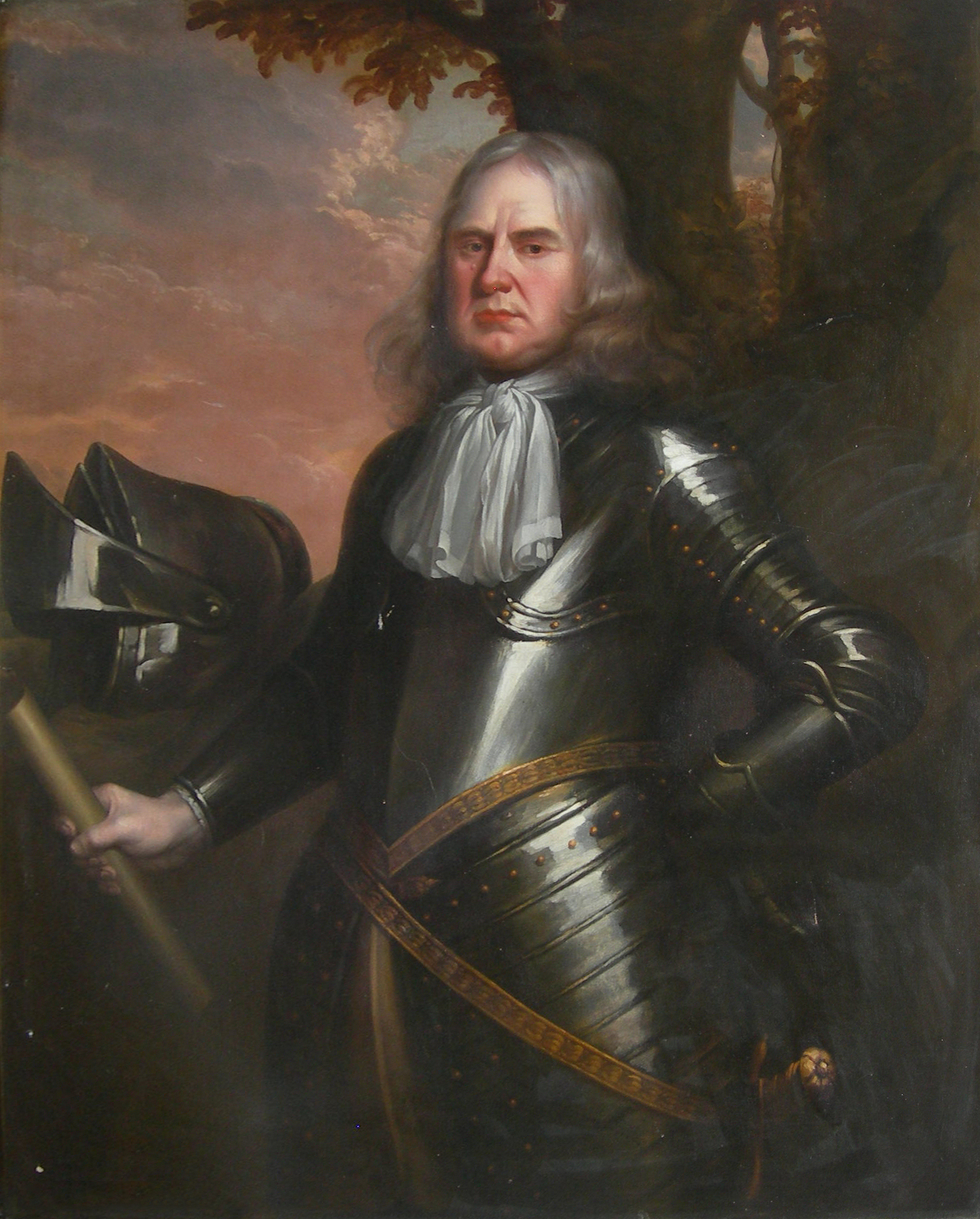
Sir Ralph Knight, Knt. attired in his armour.

Sir Ralph Knight (1619 – 21 April 1691) was an English soldier and politician who sat in the House of Commons in 1660. He served in the Parliamentary army in the English Civil War. He sold 'the Barrels' Manor House in Ullenhal Worcestershire to his cousin to join Cromwell. The Manor had been in the family since the early 1500s.

Knight was the son of William Knight of Newbury who had moved south from Worcestershire, and his wife Alice Worthington. In 1643 he was a Major in Sir Miles Hobart's regiment, commanding a troop of cavalry under the overall command of the Parliamentary General the Earl of Manchester. In the same year he was at the fight at Horncastle, and was afterwards sent by the earl to summon the . In 1644 the united armies of Lords Manchester and Fairfax opposed the forces of the Marquis of Newcastle. He was appointed to the New Model Army in 1645 as a captain in the cavalry regiment of Colonel Matthew Tomlinson. By 1647 he had become a major in the same regiment. He became aide-de-camp to General Monck. In about 1650, he purchased the estate of Langold, Yorkshire from Thomas Burton, as a residence for his wife near her relations. He was appointed a Deputy Lieutenant for the West Riding of Yorkshire in 1653. In 1659 he represented Sutherland Ross and Cromarty in the Third Protectorate Parliament.

In 1660, Knight was elected Member of Parliament for Morpeth in the Convention Parliament. He was knighted on the Restoration. In 1662 he purchased the manor of Letwell, Yorkshire. In June 1667 at the time of military emergency he was captain of a company of non-regimental horse raised from the border of Nottinghamshire and Yorkshire. The company marched to Yarmouth in case there was a Dutch invasion, but was disbanded on 16 August 1667. He became lieutenant-colonel of the Duke of Buckingham's Regiment of Foot on 12 May 1673 and in 1675 he bought the Manor of Warsop in Nottinghamshire.

== Family ==
Knight married firstly on 23 June 1646, Faith Dickinson, daughter of the Rev. William Dickinson, vicar of Rotherham. He married secondly, the widow of John Rolleston of Soucam Hall, Nottinghamshire. Rolleston had been the secretary to Sir Ralph's old antagonist, Cavendish, Duke of N^{ew}castle.

His daughter, Bridget, married Richard Taylor, and their daughter, also named Bridget, married Thomas White of Tuxford and Wallingwells, making Sir Ralph a great-great-great-great grandfather of Sir Thomas White, 1st Baronet, of Tuxford and Wallingwells.

Another daughter Christian married Jonathan Staniforth of Firbeck Hall.

== Death ==
Knight died at Firbeck in April 1691 and was buried there on 23 April.

Parliament of England
Preceded by Thomas Clarges	Member of Parliament for Sutherland, Ross and Cromarty; 1659	Succeeded by Parliament of Scotland restored
Preceded by Robert Delaval; Robert Mitford	Member of Parliament for Morpeth; 1660; With: Thomas Widdrington April–May; Sir George Downing June–December	Succeeded by Sir George Downing; Henry Widdrington
