= Edward Grey (died 1676) =

English politician

Edward Grey (c. 1611 – 17 February 1676) of Ulgham Grange, Northumberland was an English politician who sat in the House of Commons from 1660 to 1676. He fought in the Royalist army in the English Civil War.

Grey was a younger son of Sir Ralph Grey of Chillingham, and his second wife Dorothy Malet, daughter of Thomas Malet of Enmore, Somerset. He matriculated at University College, Oxford on 18 November 1625, aged 14 and was a student at Christ's College, Cambridge in 1626. He was admitted at Gray's Inn in 1629.

During the Civil War, he was a Colonel of dragoons in the Royalist army from 1642 until the surrender of Newark in 1646. He subscribed to the Covenant and the negative oath and compounded at £389 10s. He was in action again in the second Civil War in 1648, and commanded the royalist garrison of Berwick when he became a freeman of Berwick in 1648. He fled abroad and in 1652 his estate was sold by the treason trustee. Later in 1652 he returned to England to work for a restoration as one of the leaders of the ‘action party. He was arrested on 6 February 1655 and proven to be in contact with the court in exile but he was spared transportation because of ill-health.

In 1660, Grey was elected Member of Parliament for Berwick-upon-Tweed in a by-election to the Convention Parliament. He was a Gentleman of the privy chamber by June 1660. He was a J.P. for Northumberland from July 1660 and commissioner for assessment for Berwick from August 1660 to 1674. In 1661 he was given a commission as captain in the King’s Foot Guards. He was re-elected MP for Berwick in the Cavalier Parliament. In 1662 he was commissioner for loyal and indigent officers in Northumberland. He became a major in the guards in 1664 and a lieutenant-colonel on 16 March 1665. In 1665 he became J.P. for Westminster and a commissioner for licensing pedlars. He was a commissioner for hackney coaches for London and Westminster from 1667. In 1669, he became Deputy Lieutenant for Northumberland. He was commissioner for loyal and indigent officers’ accounts in 1671. From 1673 to 1674 he was commissioner for assessment for Northumberland.

Grey died at the age of about 64 and was buried at St. Paul, Covent Garden on 17 February 1676. He had married after 1640, Mary widow of Robert Mitford of Seghill, Northumberland and daughter of Robert Delaval of Cowpen, Northumberland.

Parliament of England
Preceded by Sir Thomas Widdrington; John Rushworth	Member of Parliament for Berwick-upon-Tweed; 1660–1676; With: John Rushworth 1660; Sir Thomas Widdrington 1661–1665; Daniel Collingwood 1665–1676	Succeeded by Daniel Collingwood; Viscount Osborne
