= Cuddon =

Cuddon is a surname. Notable people with the surname include:

- J. A. Cuddon (1928–1996), English author, dictionary writer, and school teacher
- Peter Cuddon (disambiguation), multiple people
- Robert Cuddon (disambiguation), multiple people
