= Allin baronets =

Extinct baronetcy in the Baronetage of England

There have been two Baronetcies created for persons with the surname Allin, both in the Baronetage of England. Both creations are extinct.

Escutcheon of the Allin baronets

The Allin Baronetcy, of Blundeston in the County of Suffolk, was created in the Baronetage of England on 7 February 1673 for the naval commander Sir Thomas Allin. The title became extinct on the death of the second Baronet in 1696.

The Allin Baronetcy, of Somerleyton in the County of Suffolk, was created in the Baronetage of England on 14 December 1699 for Richard Allin. He was the son of Edmund Anguish and his wife Alice Allin, he assumed the name and arms of Allin in lieu of that of Anguish upon inheriting the Somerleyton estates on the death, in 1696, of his maternal uncle, Sir Thomas Allin, 2nd Baronet of Blundeston. He was Member of Parliament for Dunwich 1703–1710. The title became extinct on the death of the fourth Baronet in 1794.

== Allin baronets, of Blundeston (1673) ==
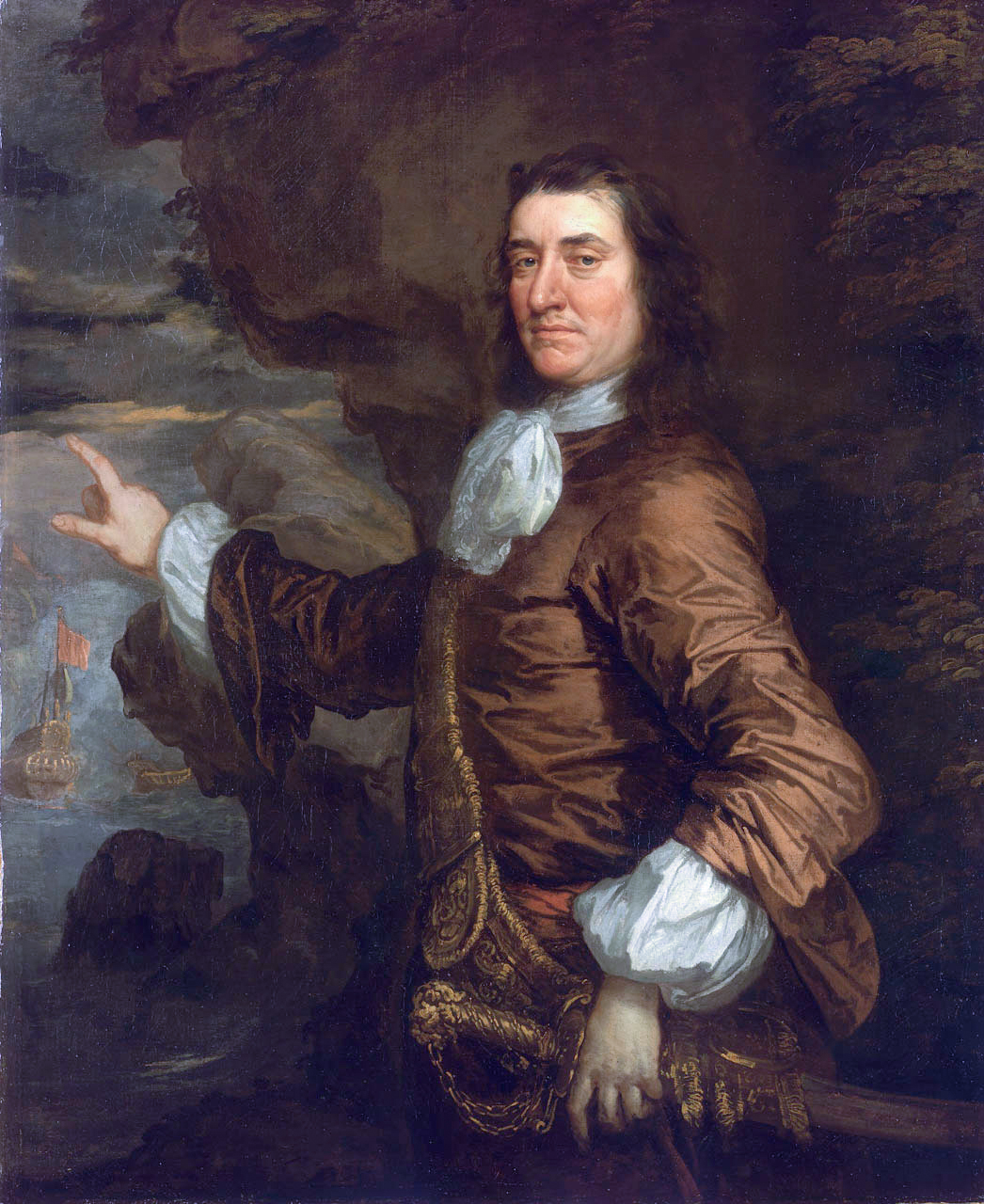
Sir Thomas Allin, 1st Baronet, of Blundeston

- Sir Thomas Allin, 1st Baronet (c. 1613–1685)
- Sir Thomas Allin, 2nd Baronet (died 1696)

== Allin baronets, of Somerleyton (1699) ==
- Sir Richard Allin, 1st Baronet (c. 1659–1725)
- Sir Thomas Allin, 2nd Baronet (died 1765)
- Sir Ashurst Allin, 3rd Baronet (c. 1720–1770)
- Sir Thomas Allin, 4th Baronet (died 1794)

== See also ==
- Alen baronets
- Allan baronets
- Allen baronets
- Alleyn baronets
- Alleyne baronets
