= Thomas Widdrington (died 1660) =

Member of the Parliament of England

Thomas Widdrington (baptized 19 June 1640 – May 1660) was an English politician who sat in the House of Commons in 1660.

Widdrington was the son of Sir Thomas Widdrington and was baptised at St. Martin's, Coney Street, York on 19 June 1640. He was educated at Wormley School, Hertfordshire. He matriculated from Christ's College, Cambridge in 1654 and was awarded an MA in 1656. In April 1660, while still a minor, he was elected member of parliament (MP) for Morpeth in the Convention Parliament. He obtained leave to accompany Thomas Fairfax, 3rd Lord Fairfax of Cameron in a delegation to King Charles II and died at The Hague, The Netherlands of a violent fever at the age of about 20.

Parliament of England
Preceded by Robert Delaval with William Fenwick	Member of Parliament for Morpeth; 1660; With: Ralph Knight	Succeeded by George Downing with Ralph Knight
