= Nicholas Barber =

Nicholas or Nick Barber may refer to:

== Musicians ==
- Doof (musician), real name Nick Barber (born 1968)
- Aaron Sprinkle, musician, real name Nick Barber (born 1974)

== Others ==
- Nicholas Barber (writer) who worked with Nick Percival
- Nicholas Barber (MP) for Dunwich
- Nicholas Barber (film critic), British film critic
- Nicholas Barber, character in Morality Play
