= Downing baronets =

Extinct baronetcy in the Baronetage of England

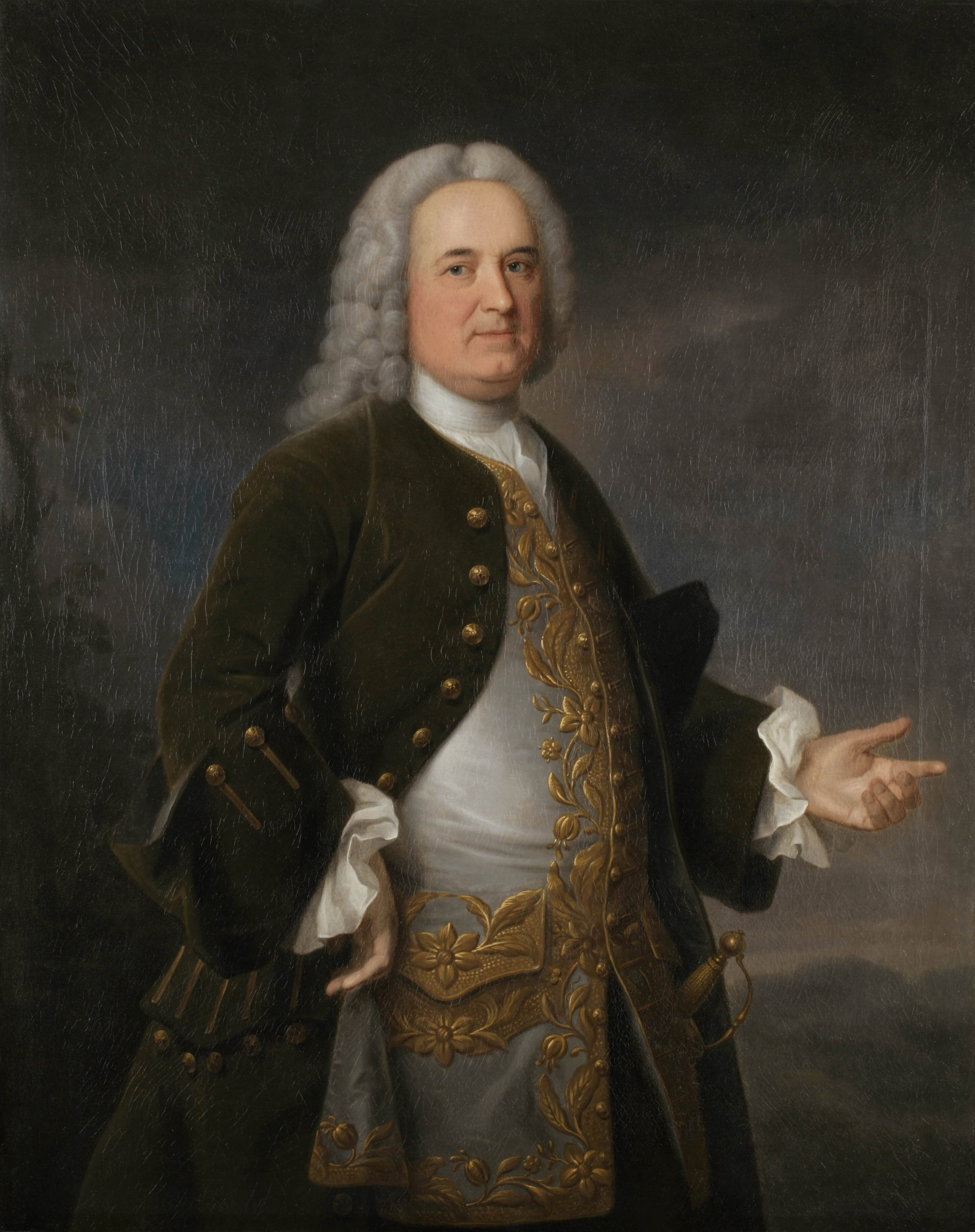
Portrait of Sir George Downing, 3rd Baronet

The Downing Baronetcy, of East Hatley in the County of Cambridge, was a title in the Baronetage of England. It was created on 1 July 1663 for the Anglo-Irish soldier, statesman and diplomat Sir George Downing, after whom Downing Street in London is named. The third baronet left his estate to create Downing College, Cambridge. The third and fourth Baronets represented Dunwich in Parliament. The title became extinct on the latter's death in 1764.

== Downing baronets, of East Hatley (1663) ==
- Sir George Downing, 1st Baronet (c. 1625–1684)
- Sir George Downing, 2nd Baronet (c. 1656–1711)
- Sir George Downing, 3rd Baronet (1685–1749)
- Sir Jacob Garrard Downing, 4th Baronet (c. 1717–1764)

== Arms ==
Downing College heraldic shield

The arms of the Downing baronets—Barry of eights, argent and vert, over all a gryphon rampant or—were adopted by Downing College.
