= Samuel Foley =

Samuel Foley may refer to:

- Samuel Foley (bishop) (1655–1695), bishop of Down and Connor
- Samuel J. Foley (politician) (1862–1922), state assemblyman and state senator from New York, and father of the district attorney
- Samuel J. Foley (district attorney) (1891–1951), district attorney in Bronx County, New York, and son of the politician
