= Alleyn baronets =

Extinct baronetcy in the Baronetage of England

- Escutcheon of the Alleyn baronets of Hatfield
- Creation date: 1629
- Status: extinct
- Extinction date: 1759
- Arms: Sable, a Cross-Potent Or.
- Crest: A Demi-Lion Azure, holding in the paws a Vessel Or.

The Alleyn baronetcy, of Hatfield in the County of Essex, was a title in the Baronetage of England. It was created on 24 June 1629 for Edward Alleyn, High Sheriff of Essex in 1629. The title became extinct on the death of the 8th Baronet in 1759.

== Alleyn baronets, of Hatfield (1629) ==
- Sir Edward Alleyn, 1st Baronet (c. 1586–1638)
- Sir Edmund Alleyn, 2nd Baronet (c. 1632–1656)
- Sir Edmund Alleyn, 3rd Baronet (died c. 1658)
- Sir George Alleyn, 4th Baronet (died 1664)
- Sir George Alleyn, 5th Baronet (died 1702)
- Sir Clopton Alleyn, 6th Baronet (died 1726)
- Sir George Alleyn, 7th Baronet (died c. 1746)
- Sir Edmund Alleyn, 8th Baronet (died 1759)

== See also ==
- Alen baronets
- Allan baronets
- Allen baronets
- Alleyne baronets
- Allin baronets
