= Robert Cuddon =

Robert Cuddon may refer to:

- Robert Cuddon (fl. 1395), MP for Dunwich in 1395
- Robert Cuddon (died 1462), MP for Dunwich 1421-1450
