= Edward Walkington =

Anglican bishop (died 1699)

Edward Walkington was an Anglican bishop in the late seventeenth century.

He was born in Loughgur and educated at Trinity College, Dublin. He was Chaplain of the Irish House of Commons then Archdeacon of Ossory from 1793 until 1795 when he became Bishop of Down and Connor. He died in January 1699.

Church of Ireland titles
Preceded by Henry Ryder	Archdeacon of Ossory; 1693–1695	Succeeded by Christopher Jenney
Preceded by Samuel Foley	Bishop of Down and Connor; 1695–1699	Succeeded by Edward Smyth
