= Sir Jacob Downing, 4th Baronet =

British politician

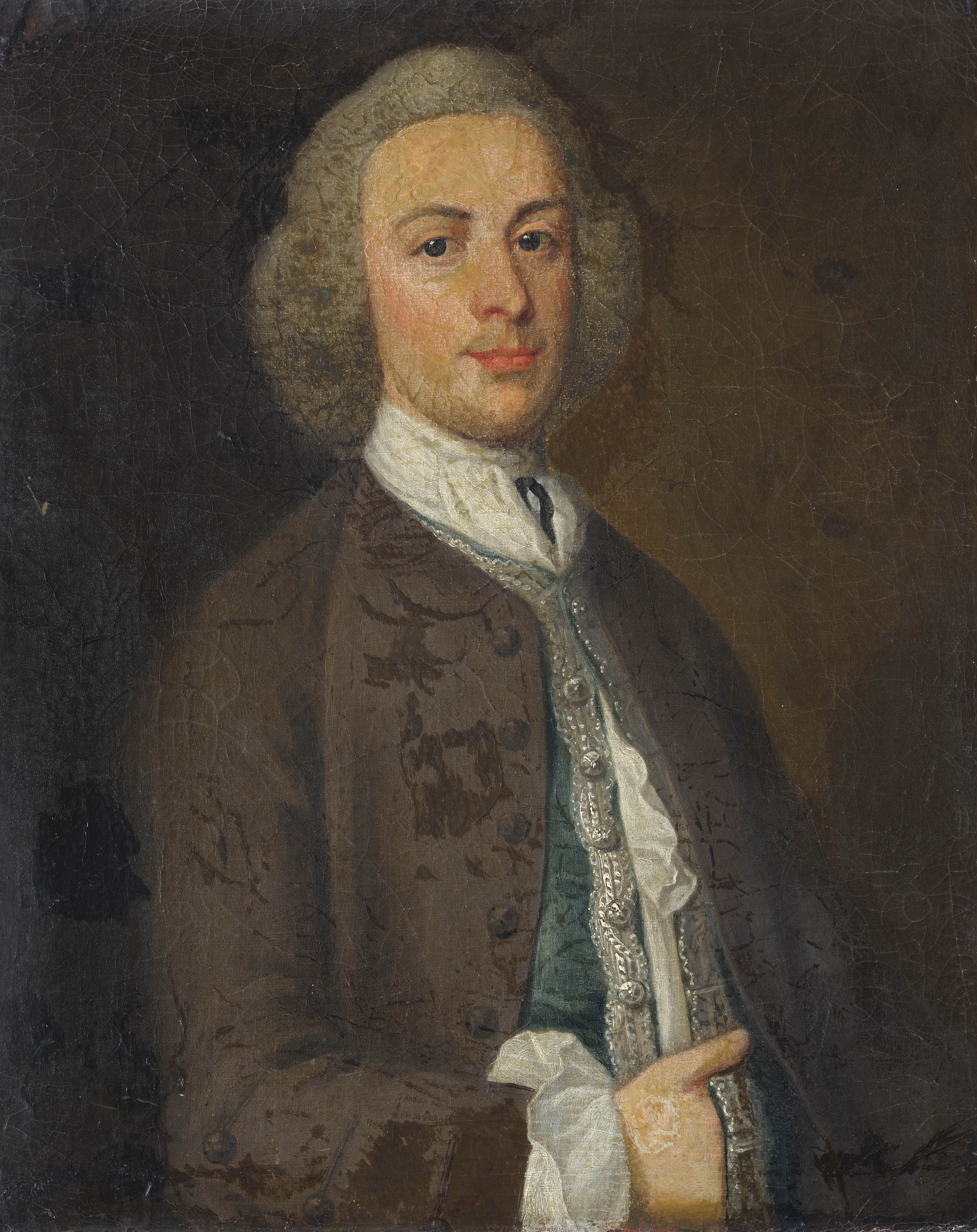
Portrait of Downing by Henry Pickering

Sir Jacob Garrard Downing, 4th Baronet MP (c. 1717 – 6 February 1764) was a British politician. He was the grandson of Sir George Downing, 1st Baronet, namesake of Downing Street; and cousin and heir of Sir George Downing, 3rd Baronet, whose Gamlingay estate would eventually establish Downing College, Cambridge despite illegal attempts by Jacob and his widow to prevent the university from receiving the estate.

== Biography ==
Downing was the oldest son of Charles Downing of Bury St Edmunds, Suffolk, and Sarah Garrard. He was named after his maternal grandfather, Jacob Garrard, who was son and heir of Sir Thomas Garrad, 2nd Baronet of Langford, but who died before his father and thus did not succeed as the third baronet. Jacob Downing had an older sister, Sarah, who died as a child before he was born. His father was comptroller of customs in Salem, Massachusetts, and became immensely wealthy, and Jacob inherited his father's wealth in 1740.

Downing was a Member of Parliament for Dunwich from 1741 to 1747, from 1749 to 1761 and from 1763 to 1764. He was closely associated with Lord Hardwicke. In the 1760s, Downing had been the sole patron of Dunwich, but in theory he also was considered to have only influence, rather than the absolute power to dictate the choice of the Members. Downing was able to occupy one seat himself and sell the choice of the other member to the Duke of Newcastle (then Prime Minister) for £1,000; it is not recorded whether he needed to share some of this largesse with his co-operative voters.

In 1749, Downing inherited the baronetcy and Gamlingay estate in Cambridgeshire from his cousin Sir George Downing, 3rd Baronet. The next year, on 17 May 1750, Downing married Margaret Price, daughter of Rev. Price, curate at Barrington, Gloucestershire. They had no children.

== Downing estate ==
Downing devoted himself to restoring his late cousin's lands, which were left in his hands in a poor state. Near the end of his life, Sir George Downing had failed to find tenants for vacant farms, and was losing £1,500 a year (equivalent to £300,650 in 2023) through his mismanagement.

Sir Jacob Downing took great pride in his land and slowly rehabilitated the estate. Old buildings were repaired, new ones built and open land enclosed, at a cost of around £30,000. One of his first acts was to commission a series of maps by Joseph Cole, showing the different farms which made up the estate. However, as he grew older, Sir Jacob's thoughts obviously turned increasingly to his lack of heir and what would happen after his death as some new barns and buildings were put onto pattens, or rollers, perhaps so that they could be moved off the entailed land by his wife after his death.

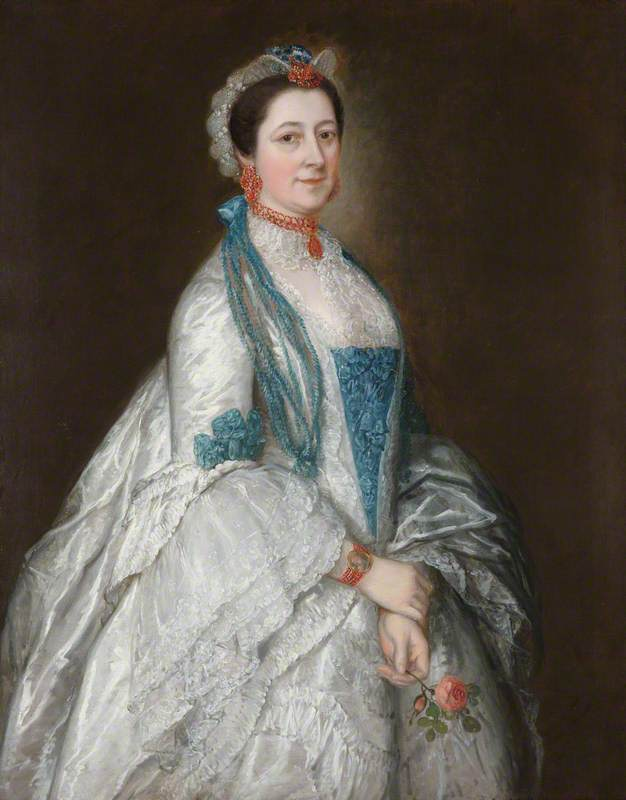
Lady Margaret Downing, portrait by Thomas Gainsborough

There were no children of the marriage, and the baronetcy became extinct in 1764, when he died at Hill Street, London. Per the third baronet's will, if Jacob Downing had no son, George Downing's estate was supposed to be used by the University of Cambridge to establish a college in his name. However, Jacob instead left the estates to his widow, which led to 40 years of litigation between Lady Margaret and the university. During this time, the estates were neglected and diminished considerably in value. Lady Margaret demolished Gamlingay Park house in 1776, "selling it brick by brick at auction for a fraction of its value".

After Downing died in 1764, in 1768, she married Admiral Sir George Bowyer, 5th Baronet, who in 1794 was created a baronet in his own right, several years after her death (18 September 1778). The legal fight for the third baronet's estates continued after her death, as she left them to her widower and a nephew.

The legal battle continued until March 1800, when the university and Lady Margaret's heirs reached an agreement. However, during this time, the value of the estate was massively reduced to a fraction of what it had been. Only 10 per cent was recovered from the £100,000 (equivalent to £11,890,602 in 2023) owed to the estate in rents. Even though the charter for the new college was finally granted in September 1800, it was not until 1806 that the first building went up, and a further 16 years passed before the first Downing College students began their studies—56 years after the death of Sir Jacob Downing.

Parliament of Great Britain
| Preceded by Sir George Downing, Bt; William Morden | Member of Parliament for Dunwich; 1741–1747; With: Sir George Downing, Bt | Succeeded by Sir George Downing, Bt; Miles Barne |
| Preceded by Sir George Downing, Bt; Miles Barne | Member of Parliament for Dunwich; 1749–1761; With: Miles Barne to 1754; Soame Jenyns 1754–58; Alexander Forrester 1758–61 | Succeeded by Eliab Harvey; Henry Fox |
| Preceded by Eliab Harvey; Henry Fox | Member of Parliament for Dunwich; 1763–1764; With: Eliab Harvey | Succeeded by Eliab Harvey; Miles Barne (politician born 1718) |
Baronetage of England
| Preceded by George Downing | Baronet (of East Hatley); 1749–1764 | extinct |
