= Allen baronets =

Extinct baronetcy in the Baronetage of the United Kingdom

There have been two baronetcies created for persons with the surname Allen, one in the Baronetage of England and one in the Baronetage of the United Kingdom. Both creations are extinct.

The Allen Baronetcy, of London, was created in the Baronetage of England on 14 June 1660 for Sir Thomas Allen, Lord Mayor of London. The title became extinct on the death of the second Baronet in 1730.

The Allen Baronetcy, of Marlow in the County of Buckingham, was created in the Baronetage of the United Kingdom on 23 January 1933 for Frederick Allen, Deputy Chairman of P&O and managing director of the British-India Steam Navigation Company. The title became extinct on the early death of the second Baronet in 1939.

== Allen baronets, of London (1660) ==
- Sir Thomas Allen, 1st Baronet (c. 1633–1690)
- Sir Thomas Allen, 2nd Baronet (c. 1648–1730)

== Allen baronets, of Marlow (1933) ==
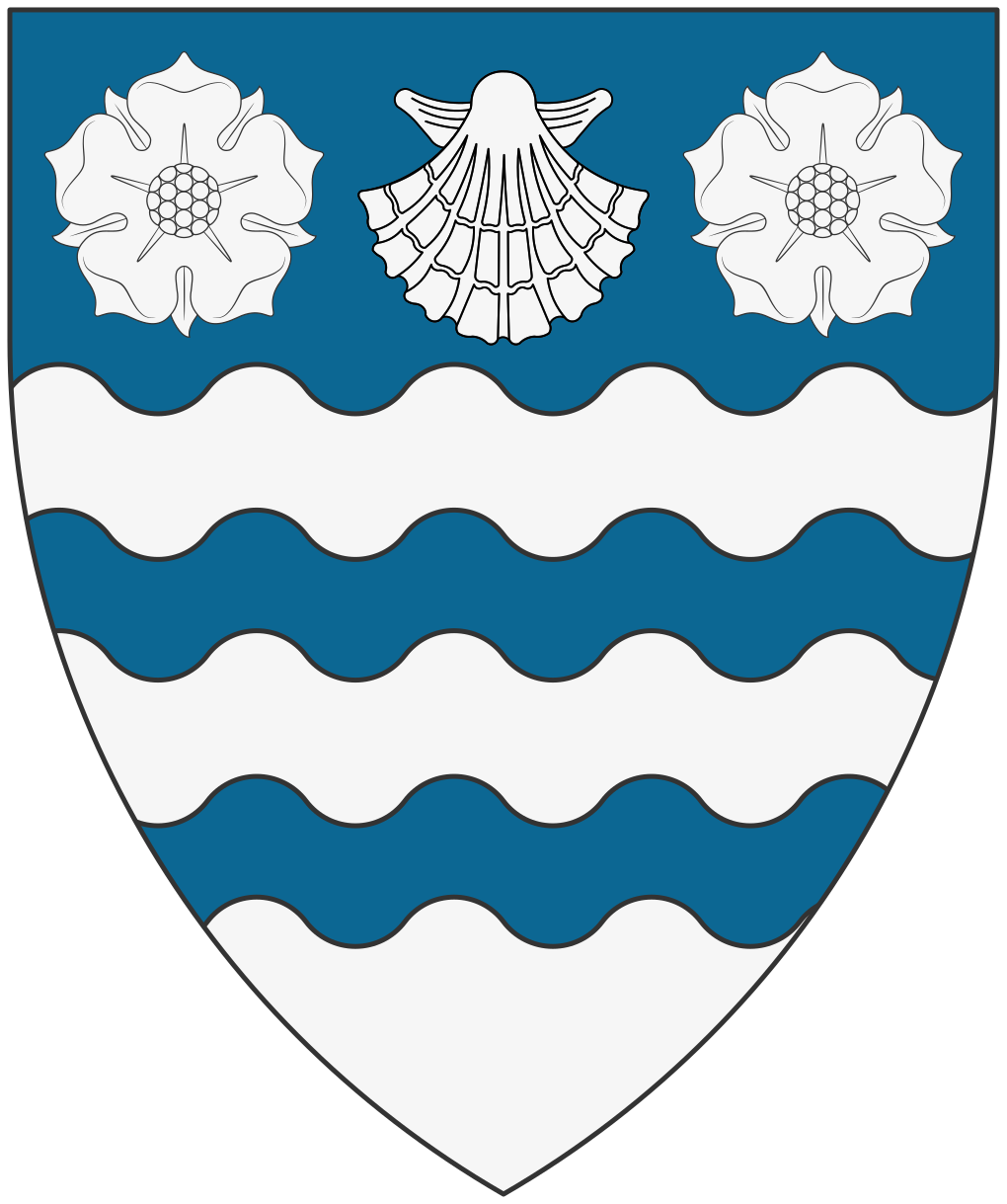
Arms of Allen of Marlow

- Sir Frederick Charles Allen, 1st Baronet (1864–1934)
- Sir Francis Raymond Allen, 2nd Baronet (1910–1939)

== See also ==
- Alen baronets
- Allan baronets
- Alleyn baronets
- Alleyne baronets
- Allin baronets

== Sources ==
- Leigh Rayment's list of baronets
