= Sir George Downing, 3rd Baronet =

British landowner and politician (1685–1749)

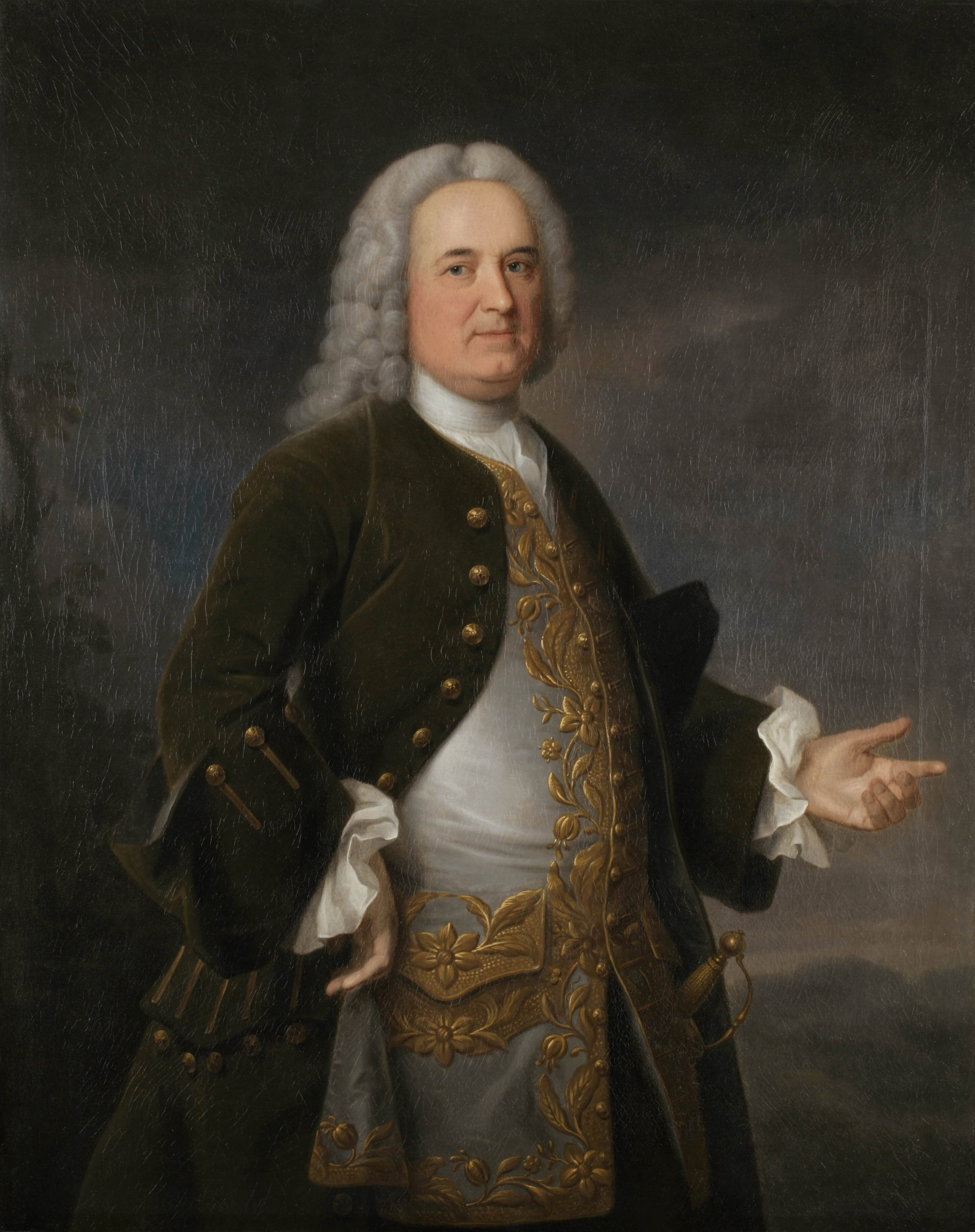
Portrait of Downing

Sir George Downing, 3rd Baronet KB MP (1685 – 10 June 1749) was a British landowner and politician who represented Dunwich in the House of Commons of Great Britain between 1710 and 1749. Through a donation in his will, he was the founder of Downing College, Cambridge.

== Biography ==
Downing was the only son of Sir George Downing, 2nd Baronet, and his wife, Lady Catharine Cecil, daughter of James Cecil, 3rd Earl of Salisbury. His grandfather, who was created a baronet in 1663, was the namesake of Downing Street.

Lady Catharine died in 1688, and, as her husband was apparently considered an unsuitable parent, the young George was brought up in the family of his maternal aunt, Lady Mary Cecil Forester, the wife of Sir William Forester of Dothill Park, in Wellington, Shropshire. In 1700, aged 15, "by procurement and persuasion of those in whose keeping he was", he married his 13-year-old cousin, Sir William's daughter, Mary, who ultimately died childless in 1734. Between his marriage and 1704 he travelled in Europe, mainly Holland, Germany, Denmark and Italy. While George was away, Mary went against George's explicit demand that she should not accept a place at court, when she became a Maid of Honour to Queen Anne. On George's return, it was apparent that the marriage had broken down. The couple agreed a financial settlement only in 1715, whereupon Mary petitioned the House of Lords to have the marriage dissolved because of non-consummation. The petition was refused and they remained married. They jointly petitioned again in 1717, asking for a separation, which was granted. That made them legally independent, with no responsibility to one another. However, neither could remarry, and neither could have a legitimate heir.

He was a Member of Parliament for the pocket borough of Dunwich, Suffolk in the parliaments of 1710 and 1713. He lost the 1715 election but, with the aid of a 99-year lease from George I for the borough, regained the seat in 1722. He held the seat from that time until his death.

He was an uninspiring politician, but remained loyal to the ministries of Robert Walpole and subsequently Henry Pelham. In 1732, as a result of his loyalty, he was created a Knight Companion of the Order of the Bath.

Downing succeeded to his father's baronetcy and estates in 1711. He built a grand family seat in Gamlingay Park in Cambridgeshire.

== Death and estate ==
Upon his own death, aged 63, in 1749, his title passed to his cousin, Sir Jacob Downing, 4th Baronet, with his will providing that if his male line should die out, his fortune and Gamlingay estate should be used to found a college at Cambridge University. Sir Jacob Downing died childless in 1764, but his widow, Margaret, Lady Downing, argued that George Downing's fortune should pass to her. This case was tied up in litigation for decades at considerable expense before the courts finally ordered that the estate should be used to found a college at Cambridge, which occurred with the founding of Downing College, Cambridge in 1800. Lady Downing then had the Downing mansion demolished in 1776.

Parliament of the United Kingdom
Preceded by Daniel Harvey; Sir Richard Allin, Bt	Member of Parliament for Dunwich; 1710–1715; With: Richard Richardson 1710–13; Sir Robert Kemp, Bt 1713–15	Succeeded by Charles Long; Sir Robert Rich, Bt
Preceded by Charles Long; Sir Robert Rich, Bt	Member of Parliament for Dunwich; 1722–1749; With: Edward Vernon 1722; Sir John Ward 1722–26; John Sambrooke 1726–27; Thomas Wyndham 1727–34; Sir Orlando Bridgeman, Bt 1734–38; William Morden 1738–41; Jacob Garrard Downing 1741–47; Miles Barne from 1747	Succeeded by Miles Barne; Sir Jacob Garrard Downing, Bt
Baronetage of England
Preceded by George Downing	Baronet (of East Hatley); 1711–1749	Succeeded by Sir Jacob Downing
