= Kemp baronets =

Extinct baronetcy in the Baronetage of England

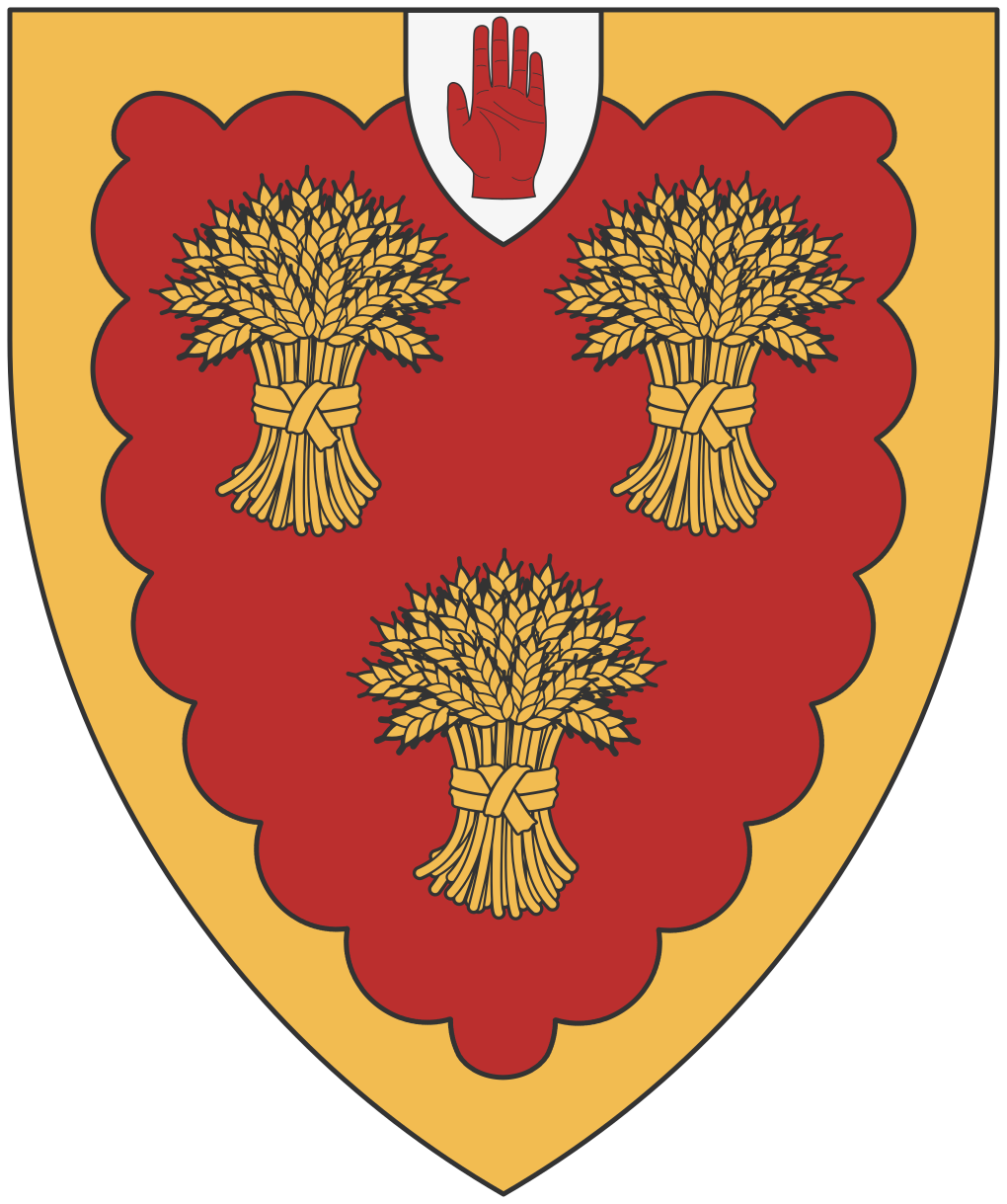
The coat of arms of Kemp of Gissing, Baronets.

The Kemp Baronetcy, of Gissing in the County of Norfolk, was a title in the Baronetage of England. It was created on 14 March 1642 for Robert Kemp. The second Baronet sat as member of parliament for Norfolk and Dunwich. The third Baronet was member of parliament for Dunwich and Suffolk. The fourth Baronet was member of parliament for Orford. The title became extinct on the death of the twelfth Baronet in 1936.

Sir Kenneth Hagar Kemp's heir and only son, Robert Hamilton Kemp, predeceased him suddenly in 1933 due to "rupture of an aneurism of the aorta". He had served as lieutenant in South Africa (1899–1902) and in World War I (1914–1918). Later in life, he was a racehorse trainer at Heathcote House. Captain Kemp was married to Violet Marie, daughter of Colonel Robert C. Dalrymple Stewart-Muirhead and had issue two daughters.

== Kemp baronets, of Gissing (1642) ==
- Sir Robert Kemp, 1st Baronet (died 1647)
- Sir Robert Kemp, 2nd Baronet (1627–1710)
- Sir Robert Kemp, 3rd Baronet (1667–1734)
- Sir Robert Kemp, 4th Baronet (1699–1752)
- Sir John Kemp, 5th Baronet (1700–1761)
- Sir John Kemp, 6th Baronet (1754–1771)
- Sir Benjamin Kemp, 7th Baronet (1708–1777)
- Sir William Kemp, 8th Baronet (1717–1799)
- Sir William Robert Kemp, 9th Baronet (1744–1804)
- Sir William Robert Kemp, 10th Baronet (1791–1874)
- Sir Thomas John Kemp, 11th Baronet (1793–1874)
- Sir Kenneth Hagar Kemp, 12th Baronet (1853–1936)
  - Capt. Robert Hamilton Kemp (1877–1933)
