= Peter Cuddon =

Peter Cuddon may refer to:

- Peter Cuddon (fl. 1372–1390), MP for Dunwich
- Peter Cuddon (fl. 1399–1410), MP for Dunwich
