= Henry Widdrington =

Henry Widdrington may refer to:

- Henry Widdrington (died 1623), English politician, Member of Parliament for Northumberland
- Henry Widdrington (died 1665), English politician, Member of Parliament for Morpeth
