= John Rushworth =

English lawyer, historian and politician

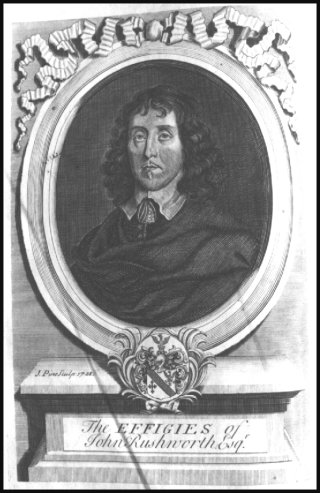
John Rushworth

John Rushworth (c. 1612 – 12 May 1690) was an English lawyer, historian and politician who sat in the House of Commons at various times between 1657 and 1685. He compiled a series of works covering the English Civil Wars throughout the 17th century called Historical Collections and also known as the Rushworth Papers.

== Early life ==
Rushworth was born at Acklington Park in Warkworth, Northumberland, the son of Lawrence Rushworth and his wife Margaret, daughter of Cuthbert Carnaby of Halton. His father was an extensive landowner and Justice of the Peace at Heath, Yorkshire, although he was in prison for debt in 1629. Rushworth was a solicitor at Berwick on Tweed from 1638 and entered Lincoln's Inn in 1640. He also began work as clerk assistant at the House of Commons in 1640: assisting Henry Elsynge, Clerk of the House of Commons, he was the first recorded individual to hold the office.

== Civil Wars ==
Rushworth followed the lead of John Pym, who, in a speech in the House of Commons on 17 April 1640, attacked the King and his government for problems within the country. After the outbreak of the Civil War, Rushworth as an "embedded journalist" followed the battles of Edge Hill (1642), Newbury (1643 and 1644), Marston Moor (1644) and Naseby (1645). In 1645 he became secretary to Thomas Fairfax, commander-in-chief of the New Model Army. When Charles I was captured, Rushworth began to record details of events leading up to, during and following the trial and execution of the King. He reported the Battle of Preston (1648) and the Battle of Worcester (1651).

== Legal authority ==
Following the execution of Charles I in 1649, Rushworth became personal secretary to Oliver Cromwell. He began drafting plans for the abolition of the monarchy and the House of Lords, and the establishment of an English Republic under the leadership of Cromwell. When Cromwell became Lord Protector in 1653, Rushworth was promoted to Registrar of the Court of Admiralty. In 1657 he was elected Member of Parliament for Berwick in the Second Protectorate Parliament. As a member of the Cromwellian government he enjoyed the friendships of John Milton (who served Cromwell as the official State Censor); John Owen; John Bunyan and many other well known people of that period.

== Death of Cromwell and Restoration ==
When Oliver Cromwell died on 3 September 1658, his son Richard Cromwell became Lord Protector. Rushworth was re-elected MP for Berwick in the Third Protectorate Parliament. He completed his written histories of the period and dedicated them to Richard Cromwell. As Richard Cromwell was unable to continue the office established by his father as Lord Protector, by 1660 real power had shifted to the Council of State and Rushworth became Secretary of the council. He was re-elected MP for Bewick in the Convention Parliament in 1660. Negotiations were then undertaken with the son of Charles I to return to England as its king, subject to the rule of Parliament. When Charles II took to the throne and restored the monarchy, Rushworth was reassigned to the office of Treasury Solicitor. On 7 June 1660 he presented to the Privy Council certain volumes of its records, which he claimed to have preserved from plunder "during the late unhappy times", and received the king's thanks for their restoration.

Reports were spread, however, of Rushworth's complicity in the late king's death, and he was called before the lords to give an account of the deliberations of the regicides, but professed to know nothing except by hearsay. Rushworth was not re-elected to the parliament of 1661, but continued to act as agent for the town of Berwick, although complaints were made that the king could look for little obedience so long as such men were agents for corporations.

== Later years ==
In September 1667, when Sir Orlando Bridgeman was made lord-keeper, he appointed Rushworth his secretary. The colony of Massachusetts also employed him as its agent at a salary of twelve guineas a year and his expenses, but it was scoffingly said in 1674 that all he had done for the colony was 'not worth a rush'.

Rushworth was elected MP for Berwick again in March 1679 for the First Exclusion Parliament and in October 1679 for the Second Exclusion Parliament. He was returned again in March 1681, Rushworth and seems to have supported the Whig leaders. Though he had held lucrative posts and had inherited an estate from his cousin, Sir Richard Tempest, Rushworth's affairs were greatly embarrassed. He spent the last six years of his life in the King's Bench Prison in Southwark, "where, being reduced to his second childship, for his memory was quite decayed by taking too much brandy to keep up his spirits, he quietly gave up the ghost in his lodging in a certain alley there, called Rules Court, on 12 May 1690". He was buried in St. George's Church, Southwark. Wood states that Rushworth died at the age of eighty-three, but in a letter written in 1675 Rushworth describes himself as sixty-three at that date.

== Influence ==
While Rushworth was remembered as a person, his writings found favour in America where they served as a source of inspiration for Thomas Jefferson. Jefferson bought a copy of Rushworth's Historical Collections for use in his own library and he often quoted from them. Rushworth was a contemporary of John Lilburne whose writings had a profound impact on the history of the English Civil Wars of the 17th century. Although his senior, he also shared much in common with Oliver Cromwell (born 1599), because they were evangelical Christians who believed that the Church of England should undergo a total reformation, contrary to the wishes of King Charles I. His views of Charles I as a king who had declared war on his own people, were later echoed in words by Thomas Jefferson and others when writing about the reign of George III in the Declaration of Independence.

== Family ==
Rushworth married Hannah Eldred, daughter John Eldred, Citizen and Clothworker of London, on 4 January 1643/4 at St Mary Abchurch, London. At his death Rushworth left four daughters:

1. Hannah, married, February 1664, Sir Francis Fane of Fulbeck, Lincolnshire
2. Rebecca, married, August 1667, Robert Blaney of Kinsham, Herefordshire
3. Margaret
4. Katherine, whose letter to the Duke of Newcastle on her father's death is printed in the Report on the Duke of Portland's Manuscripts

== Legacy ==
In 1890, King's Bench Prison in Rule's Court was demolished. Rushworth School was then built on the site and the court was renamed Rushworth Street. A portrait of Rushworth, by R. White, is prefixed to the third part of his Historical Collections.

== Notes ==
Parliament of England
Preceded by George Fenwick	Member of Parliament for Berwick-upon-Tweed; 1657–1659	Succeeded by Thomas Widdrington; Robert Scawen
Preceded by Thomas Widdrington; Robert Scawen	Member of Parliament for Berwick-upon-Tweed; 1660; With: Thomas Widdrington; Edward Grey	Succeeded by Edward Grey; Thomas Widdrington
Preceded by Daniel Collingwood; Viscount Osborne	Member of Parliament for Berwick-upon-Tweed; 1679–1685; With: Ralph Grey	Succeeded by Philip Bickerstaffe; Hon. Ralph Widdrington
