= Sir Richard Allin, 1st Baronet =

Sir Richard Allin, 1st Baronet (c.1659–1725), of Somerleyton Hall, Suffolk, was a Whig politician who sat in the House of Commons from 1709 to 1710.

== Early life ==
Allin was born as Richard Anguish, the second, but the eldest surviving son of Edmund Anguish of Moulton, Norfolk and his wife Alice Allin, daughter of Sir Thomas Allin, 1st Baronet of Olderings House, Lowestoft, Suffolk and Mark Lane, London. He was educated at Great Yarmouth and was appointed joint customer of Great Yarmouth in 1685. He was admitted at St John's College, Cambridge on 30 April 1695, aged 15. In 1696, he succeeded his uncle Sir Thomas Allin and assumed the name of Allin. He married by a settlement dated 19 September 1699, Frances Ashurst, daughter of Sir Henry Ashurst, 1st Baronet. He succeeded his father in 1699 and was created baronet on 14 December 1699.

== Career ==
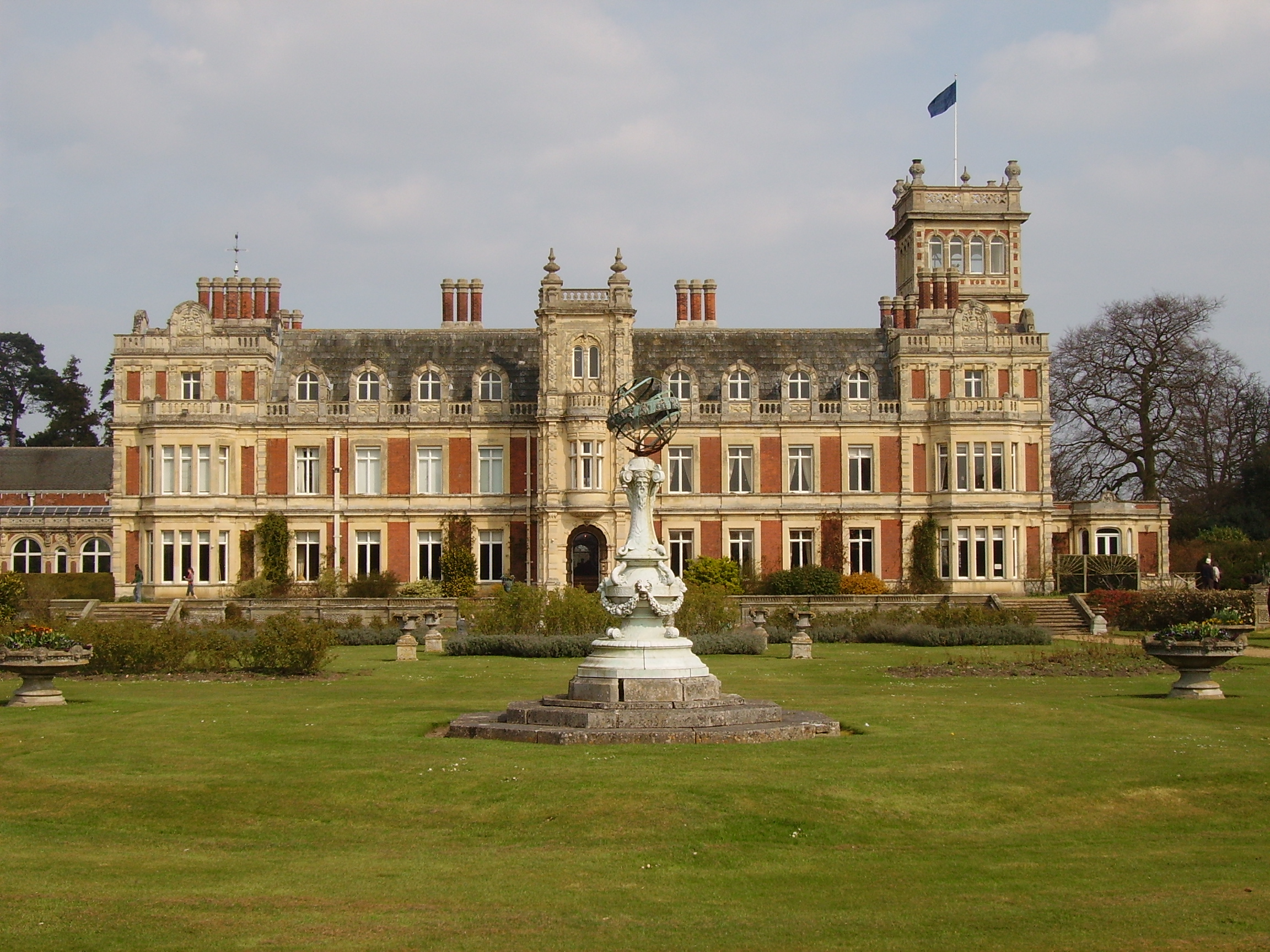
Somerleyton Hall – The garden front

Allin was High Sheriff of Suffolk between 3 and 14 December 1702. He became sole customer of Great Yarmouth in 1708. At the 1708 British general election, Allin stood as Whig at Dunwich but was defeated in the poll. However he petitioned and was seated as Member of Parliament for Dunwich on 15 January 1709. He was thereupon required to give up his post in the customs. He voted for the naturalization of the Palatines in 1709 and for the impeachment of Dr Sacheverell in 1710. He was defeated at the 1710 British general election and did not stand again.

== Later life and legacy ==
Allin had stood surety for Samuel Pacy, a former receiver-general for Suffolk and was required to pay over £3,600 due to the Treasury as part of the arrears of Pacy. His total debts totalled £11,775, and he had to obtain a private Act in 1711 to allow him to sell off part of his estate. He died on 19 October. 1725. He had three surviving sons and one daughter and was succeeded by his son Thomas. His wife died in 1743.

Parliament of Great Britain
Preceded by Robert Kemp; Sir Charles Blois, Bt	Member of Parliament for Dunwich; 1709–1710; With: Daniel Harvey	Succeeded by Sir George Downing, Bt; Richard Richardson
Baronetage of England
New creation	Baronet (of Somerleyton); 1699-1725	Succeeded by Sir Thomas Allin, 2nd Baronet
