= Sir George Downing, 2nd Baronet =

Son and heir of Sir George Downing, 1st Baronet

Sir George Downing, 2nd Baronet (c. 1656 – June 1711) was a British civil servant. He was the son and heir of Sir George Downing, 1st Baronet, for whom Downing Street is named.

His father worked as Teller of the Receipt of the Exchequer from 1660 until 1684 and was made a baronet of East Hatley, in 1663. In 1680, the younger George Downing joined his father as a Teller of the Receipt of the Exchequer, holding that position until April 1689. His father died in July 1684, and the younger Downing inherited his father's baronetcy.

On 12 July 1683, Downing married Lady Catharine Cecil, daughter of James Cecil, 3rd Earl of Salisbury, and his wife Lady Margaret Manners, daughter of the Earl of Rutland. They had one son before Lady Catharine's death in 1688, George Downing, who inherited his father's title upon the second baronet's death in June 1711. George married Mary Forester, daughter of Sir William Forester of Dothill, Shropshire, in whose home he was brought up following his mother's death.

He also served as Sheriff of Cambridgeshire and Huntingdonshire in 1686–87.

Parliament of England
Unknown	Teller of the Exchequer; 1680–1689	Succeeded by Henry Maynard
Baronetage of England
Preceded by George Downing	Baronet (of East Hatley); 1684–1711	Succeeded by Sir George Downing
