= Richard Richardson (British politician) =

British politician (c. 1664–1714)

Richard Richardson (c. 1664 – 31 December 1714) was an English judge and Tory Member of Parliament.

He was the son of John Richardson of St. Bartholomew Exchange, London and Little Grove, East Barnet, Hertfordshire and educated in the law at the Middle Temple, where he was called to the bar in 1686. He became a Serjeant-at-law in 1705 and a judge of Sheriffs’ Courts, London by 1707, probably for life.

He was Member of Parliament (MP) for Dunwich from 1710 to 1713, and for Ipswich from 1 April 1714 until his death on 31 December 1714.

He married, in 1691, Sarah, probably the daughter of George Solme of Gillingham, Dorset and had 1 son and 1 daughter.

Parliament of Great Britain
Preceded by Sir Richard Allin, Bt; Daniel Harvey	Member of Parliament for Dunwich; 1710 – 1713; With: Sir George Downing, Bt	Succeeded by Sir George Downing, Bt; Sir Robert Kemp, Bt
Preceded by William Churchill; William Thompson	Member of Parliament for Ipswich; 1714–1715; With: Orlando Bridgeman	Succeeded by William Thompson; William Churchill
