= Teller of the Receipt of the Exchequer =

Former office in the English Exchequer

The Teller of the Receipt of the Exchequer was an office in the English Exchequer.

The Tellers of the Exchequer received any money to be paid into the Exchequer, noted the amount in a book, and sent a copy of the entry, called a Teller's Bill, to the Tally Court so that a tally could be made of it. At the end of each day, the money they had received, as determined by the Bills, was removed from their chests to be deposited in the Treasury. During the reign of Richard I, these officials numbered ten, but by the time of Henry III, they had been reduced to four, which number remained constant until the abolition of the office. With several other offices of the ancient Exchequer, that of Teller of the Receipt was done away with on 10 October 1834; the office's responsibilities were given to the new Comptroller General of the Exchequer.

== Tellers of the Exchequer (1660–1834) ==
Date	One	Two	Three	Four
1660	Sir George Downing, 1st Baronet	Leonard Pinckney	John Loving	Lawrence Squibb
1661	Sir George Downing, 1st Baronet	William Pinckney	John Loving	Lawrence Squibb
1673	Sir George Downing, 1st Baronet	Sir William D'Oyly, 2nd Baronet	John Loving	Lawrence Squibb
1674	Sir George Downing, 1st Baronet	Sir William D'Oyly, 2nd Baronet	John Loving	Thomas Vernon
1677	Sir George Downing, 1st Baronet	vacant; D'Oyly suspended	John Loving	Thomas Vernon
1678	Sir George Downing, 1st Baronet	(two deputies)	John Loving	Thomas Vernon
1680	Sir George Downing, 1st Baronet	Sir George Downing, 2nd Baronet	John Loving	Thomas Vernon
1684	Simon Clifford	Sir George Downing, 2nd Baronet	John Loving	Thomas Vernon
1685	Simon Clifford	Sir George Downing, 2nd Baronet	John Loving	Francis Villiers
January 1689	Thomas Howard	Sir George Downing, 2nd Baronet	John Loving	Francis Villiers
April 1689	Thomas Howard	Henry Maynard	John Loving	Francis Villiers
1693	Thomas Howard	Henry Maynard	Henry Carew	Francis Villiers
February 1694	Thomas Howard	Henry Maynard	Henry Carew	John Berkeley, 4th Viscount Fitzhardinge
October 1694	Thomas Howard	Guy Palmes	Henry Carew	John Berkeley, 4th Viscount Fitzhardinge
1699	Thomas Howard	Guy Palmes	Francis Godolphin	John Berkeley, 4th Viscount Fitzhardinge
1701	Sir John Stanley, 1st Baronet	Guy Palmes	Francis Godolphin	John Berkeley, 4th Viscount Fitzhardinge
29 June 1702	James Vernon	Guy Palmes	Francis Godolphin	John Berkeley, 4th Viscount Fitzhardinge
30 June 1702	James Vernon	Sir Christopher Musgrave, 4th Baronet	Francis Godolphin	John Berkeley, 4th Viscount Fitzhardinge
May 1704	James Vernon	Sir Christopher Musgrave, 4th Baronet	Thomas Coke	John Berkeley, 4th Viscount Fitzhardinge
September 1704	James Vernon	Francis Robartes	Thomas Coke	John Berkeley, 4th Viscount Fitzhardinge
1706	James Vernon	Francis Robartes	Peregrine Bertie	John Berkeley, 4th Viscount Fitzhardinge
13 October 1710	John Smith	Francis Robartes	Peregrine Bertie	John Berkeley, 4th Viscount Fitzhardinge
31 October 1710	John Smith	Russell Robartes	Peregrine Bertie	John Berkeley, 4th Viscount Fitzhardinge
1711	John Smith	Russell Robartes	George Hay, Viscount Dupplin	John Berkeley, 4th Viscount Fitzhardinge
July 1712	Thomas Mansel, 1st Baron Mansel	Russell Robartes	George Hay, Viscount Dupplin	John Berkeley, 4th Viscount Fitzhardinge
December 1712	Thomas Mansel, 1st Baron Mansel	Russell Robartes	George Hay, Viscount Dupplin	vacant
1713	Thomas Mansel, 1st Baron Mansel	Russell Robartes	George Hay, Viscount Dupplin	Basil Feilding, 4th Earl of Denbigh
6 November 1714	John Smith	John West, 6th Baron De La Warr	George Hay, Viscount Dupplin	Basil Feilding, 4th Earl of Denbigh
January 1715	John Smith	John West, 6th Baron De La Warr	Sir Roger Mostyn, 3rd Baronet	Basil Feilding, 4th Earl of Denbigh
7 November 1715	John Smith	Richard Onslow, 1st Baron Onslow	Sir Roger Mostyn, 3rd Baronet	Lord William Powlett
1716	John Smith	Richard Onslow, 1st Baron Onslow	Richard Hampden	Lord William Powlett
21 March 1718	John Smith	Thomas Newport, 1st Baron Torrington	Thomas Onslow, 2nd Baron Onslow	Lord William Powlett
1719	John Smith	George Parker, 2nd Earl of Macclesfield	Thomas Onslow, 2nd Baron Onslow	Lord William Powlett
October 1723	vacant	George Parker, 2nd Earl of Macclesfield	Thomas Onslow, 2nd Baron Onslow	Lord William Powlett
1724	George Treby	George Parker, 2nd Earl of Macclesfield	Thomas Onslow, 2nd Baron Onslow	Lord William Powlett
1727	Thomas Townshend	George Parker, 2nd Earl of Macclesfield	Thomas Onslow, 2nd Baron Onslow	Lord William Powlett
1729	Thomas Townshend	George Parker, 2nd Earl of Macclesfield	Thomas Onslow, 2nd Baron Onslow	Sir Charles Turner, 1st Baronet
1738	Thomas Townshend	George Parker, 2nd Earl of Macclesfield	Thomas Onslow, 2nd Baron Onslow	Philip Yorke, 2nd Earl of Hardwicke
1741	Thomas Townshend	George Parker, 2nd Earl of Macclesfield	Horatio Walpole, 1st Baron Walpole	Philip Yorke, 2nd Earl of Hardwicke
1757	Thomas Townshend	George Parker, 2nd Earl of Macclesfield	James Waldegrave, 2nd Earl Waldegrave	Philip Yorke, 2nd Earl of Hardwicke
April 1763	Thomas Townshend	George Parker, 2nd Earl of Macclesfield	Robert Henley, 2nd Earl of Northington	Philip Yorke, 2nd Earl of Hardwicke
May 1763	Thomas Townshend	George Nugent-Temple-Grenville, 1st Marquess of Buckingham	Robert Henley, 2nd Earl of Northington	Philip Yorke, 2nd Earl of Hardwicke
1766	John Jeffreys Pratt, 1st Marquess Camden	George Nugent-Temple-Grenville, 1st Marquess of Buckingham	Robert Henley, 2nd Earl of Northington	Philip Yorke, 2nd Earl of Hardwicke
1786	John Jeffreys Pratt, 1st Marquess Camden	George Nugent-Temple-Grenville, 1st Marquess of Buckingham	Edward Thurlow, 1st Baron Thurlow	Philip Yorke, 2nd Earl of Hardwicke
1790	John Jeffreys Pratt, 1st Marquess Camden	George Nugent-Temple-Grenville, 1st Marquess of Buckingham	Edward Thurlow, 1st Baron Thurlow	Henry Bathurst, 3rd Earl Bathurst
1806	John Jeffreys Pratt, 1st Marquess Camden	George Nugent-Temple-Grenville, 1st Marquess of Buckingham	Hon. William Eden	Henry Bathurst, 3rd Earl Bathurst
1810	John Jeffreys Pratt, 1st Marquess Camden	George Nugent-Temple-Grenville, 1st Marquess of Buckingham	Charles Philip Yorke	Henry Bathurst, 3rd Earl Bathurst
1813	John Jeffreys Pratt, 1st Marquess Camden	Spencer Perceval	Charles Philip Yorke	Henry Bathurst, 3rd Earl Bathurst
April 1834	John Jeffreys Pratt, 1st Marquess Camden	Spencer Perceval	Charles William Manningham	Henry Bathurst, 3rd Earl Bathurst
