= Robert Browne (died 1558) =

English politician

Robert Browne (by 1507 – 21 December 1558), of Leiston, Suffolk and the Middle Temple, London, was an English politician.

He was a member (MP) of the parliament of England for Dunwich in 1542, 1545 and 1554.
