= William Woodward (MP) =

William Woodward (fl. 1388), from Dunwich, Suffolk, was an English Member of Parliament (MP).

He was a Member of the Parliament of England for Dunwich in 1388.
