= Lucy Winthrop =

- Born: January 9, 1600 (in Julian calendar); Groton
- Died: April 10, 1679; London
- Occupation: Correspondent
- Spouse: Emanuel Downing
- Children: 9, including Sir George Downing, 1st Baronet
- Relatives: John Winthrop

Lucy Winthrop Downing (January 9, 1600 – April 10, 1679) was an early American Puritan settler. She was the sister of John Winthrop, leader of the Massachusetts Bay Colony. Her letters are collected as the Letters of Mrs. Lucy Downing (1871).

Lucy Winthrop was born on January 9, 1600 in Groton, Suffolk, the daughter of Adam Winthrop, a lawyer, and his second wife, Anne Browne. In 1622, she married lawyer Emanuel Downing. They would have 9 children, including Sir George Downing, 1st Baronet. In 1638, they emigrated to Salem, Massachusetts on the Thomas and Frances. In 1656 Emanuel Downing received an appointment in Scotland, so they moved to Edinburgh. He died in 1660 and she relocated to England, where she lived the rest of her life.

Downing's letters provide valuable insight into Puritan life in England, the settlement of the Massachusetts Bay Colony, and daily life in colonial America.
