= Augustine Knight =

English Member of Parliament

Augustine Knight (fl. 1388 - 1393), of Dunwich, Suffolk, was an English Member of Parliament (MP).

He was a Member of the Parliament of England for Dunwich in February 1388 and 1393.
