= Hugh Thorpe =

Hugh Thorpe (fl. 1380s), of Dunwich, Suffolk, was an English Member of Parliament (MP).

He was a Member of the Parliament of England for Dunwich in February 1383 and 1386. His son, Robert Thorpe, was also an MP.
