= Thomas Hacket =

Anglican bishop (died 1697)

Thomas Hacket, D.D. was an Anglican bishop in the second half of the seventeenth century.

An Englishman, he was educated at Trinity College, Dublin. He was Vicar of Cheshunt before his appointment as Dean of Cork on 31 May 1661. He was appointed a Chaplain to King Charles II of England in 1662. In 1672 he became Bishop of Down and Connor; and held this See until he was deprived in 1694. He died in 1697

Church of Ireland titles
Preceded by Edward Worth	Dean of Cork; 1661–1662	Succeeded by Roger Boyle
Preceded by Roger Boyle	Bishop of Down and Connor; 1672–1694	Succeeded by Samuel Foley
