= John Harrison alias Hall =

English parliament member

John Harrison alias Hall (by 1498–1548), of Broadbridges in Sullington, Sussex, was an English Member of Parliament (MP) for Dunwich in 1547.
