= John Bagge =

English politician of the 14th century

John Bagge (fl. 1372–1388) of Dunwich, Suffolk, was an English politician.

== Career ==
He was a member (MP) of the parliament of England for Dunwich in 1372, 1373, October 1377, January 1380 and September 1388.
