= Francis Yaxley =

Member of the Parliament of England

Francis Yaxley (died 1565) was an English politician and conspirator.

== Life ==
Yaxley was the eldest son of Richard Yaxley of Mellis, Suffolk, by his wife Anne, daughter of Roger Austin of Earlsham, Suffolk. The family were settled at Yaxley Hall, near Eye, Suffolk, where the descendants of Richard's uncle, John Yaxley, a serjeant-at-law in the reign of Henry VII, lived until the eighteenth century. Richard Yaxley has been confused by David Elisha Davy with his physician half-brother, Robert Yaxley, M.D.

Francis owed his introduction at court to William Cecil; about 1547 he obtained employment by the privy council, possibly in the signet office, and in September 1548 he was engaged in hiring Italian mercenaries for service in England. In 1550 he was sent to Italy to complete his diplomatic education, and was attached to the embassy of Peter Vannes. He returned to England in November 1552, was returned to parliament for Dunwich on 22 February 1553, and was admitted a student of Gray's Inn; but in the following April he was sent to join Nicholas Wotton, the English ambassador in France.

Yaxley returned to England early in the reign of Mary I. After taking letters to Calais, he sent a letter with news from the court to William Cecil on 12 October 1554. He reported that Mary and Philip II of France danced at a masque where performers were dressed as mariners. He thought the masque was produced at the suggestion of the Lord Admiral, William Howard, 1st Baron Howard of Effingham. A Spanish style equestrian entertainment called a Giuco di Canne was planned to take place at Smithfield. He explained that Spanish artisans in London had been ordered to close their shops, as they infringed the privileges of English traders.

On 3 October 1555 he was elected member of parliament for Stamford. Before March 1557 he had become clerk of the signet, and in January 1558 he was returned to parliament for Saltash. He retained his clerkship under Elizabeth I, and letters to him from prominent men (Sir Thomas Chaloner, Viscount Montague, Sir Thomas Wharton, the Earl of Huntingdon), requesting his co-operation in their suits, indicate that he had some influence.

He was, however, according to the Spanish ambassador, a good Catholic. The ambassador also stated that in January 1561 he was in prison for talking about Elizabeth's proposed marriage with Lord Robert Dudley. In the same year he was said to be pushing a scheme for the queen's marriage with the king of Sweden. The Countess of Lennox employed him to obtain information from the Spanish ambassador, and to further the project of marriage between the countess's son Henry Stewart, Lord Darnley, and Mary Queen of Scots. On 14 February 1562 Yaxley wrote to Dudley from Ipswich, asking for his assistance: he had been summoned to appear before the council, and before the 22nd he was in the Tower of London. The articles against the Countess of Lennox were partly based on Yaxley's confession. Yaxley himself was examined by the privy council on 14 January 1563.

The date of Yaxley's release is uncertain; but in July 1565 the Spanish ambassador reported to Philip II that he was going to Flanders, and then to Scotland. His stay in Flanders was short, and about 20 August he embarked for Scotland. On the way his vessel was chased and fired on by a slower English man-of-war. He landed at Edinburgh on the 25th, and at once became Darnley's confidant and secretary. Mary also told him all her secrets, and selected him to go to Philip II and place her cause at Philip's disposal and under his protection. Yaxley was, however, unable to control his tongue, and within a few days Thomas Randolph was able to describe the objects of his mission to the English government.

Yaxley meanwhile sailed from Dumbarton on 16 September, and, travelling through Flanders, reached Segovia on 20 October. He was well received by Philip, and lodged at the house of Gonsalo Perez. Five days later he set out on his return, with Philip's assurances of support and a sum of money. His vessel was wrecked in the North Sea, and Yaxley's body was washed up on the coast of Northumberland, the money on it being made the subject of a diplomatic dispute between Mary and Elizabeth. The body was removed for burial to Yaxley, to the poor and church of which he left bequests by his will, dated 3 July 1561.

== Family ==
He married Margaret, third daughter of Sir Henry Hastings of Bramston, Leicestershire, but apparently had no issue, and bequeathed his property and interest in Yaxley Hall to his father, who survived him.

Parliament of England
Preceded by Thomas Heydon; Robert Coppyn	Member of Parliament for Dunwich; March 1553 – October 1553; With: Robert Coppyn	Succeeded by Nicholas Hasborough; Robert Coppyn
Preceded by John Fenton; Henry Lee	Member of Parliament for Stamford; 1555; With: Francis Thorneff	Succeeded by Francis Thorneff; John Houghton
Preceded by Alexander Nowell; Nicholas St. John	Member of Parliament for Saltash; 1558; With: Thomas Williams	Succeeded by Richard Reynell; Richard Forsett
