= Samuel Foley (bishop) =

Irish bishop (1655–1695)

- Church: Church of Ireland
- Diocese: Diocese of Down and Dromore
- Predecessor: Thomas Hacket
- Successor: Edward Walkington

Samuel Foley (1655–1695), was bishop of Down and Connor.

== Life ==
Foley was the eldest son of Samuel Foley of Clonmel and Dublin (d. 1695), and the younger brother of Thomas Foley, founder of the Old Swinford Hospital. His mother, Elizabeth, was sister of Colonel Solomon Richards of Polsboro, Wexford. He was born at Clonmel 25 November 1655. He was educated firstly at Kilkenny College and was admitted as a commoner at Trinity College, Dublin on 8 June 1672. He was elected as a fellow on 11 June 1697 and was ordained in the church of Ireland in 1678. On 14 February 1688–9 he was installed as chancellor of St. Patrick's Cathedral, Dublin, and was attainted by James II's parliament in the same year. On 4 April 1691 he became dean of Achonry and precentor of Killala. He proceeded D.D. of Trinity College in the same year. On 4 October 1694 he was enthroned bishop of Down and Connor in succession to Thomas Hacket, who had been deprived for gross neglect of duty.

He died of fever at Lisburn 22 May 1695, and was buried there. The bishop was married, and left children.

== Writings ==
- Two sermons, the first preached in Christ-Church, Dublin, Feb. 19 1681, the other [...] Apr. 24 1682 (London, 1683).
- A sermon preached at the primary visitation of His Grace Francis Lord Arch-Bishop of Dublin (London, 1683).
- An Account of the Giant's Causeway published in the Philosophical Transactions for 1694.
- An Exhortation to the Inhabitants of Down and Connor concerning the Religious Education of their Children (Dublin 1695).

Foley left some manuscripts on the controversy between Protestantism and Roman Catholicism to the library of Trinity College, Dublin.
