= Peter Cuddon (fl. 1372–1390) =

English politician

Peter Cuddon (fl. 1372–1390), of Dunwich, Suffolk, was an English member of Parliament.

== Family ==
His sons were Peter Cuddon and Robert Cuddon, both MPs for Dunwich.

== Career ==
He was a member (MP) of the parliament of England for Dunwich in 1372, 1373, February 1383, April 1384, 1386, September 1388 and January 1390.
