= Robert Mitford =

Robert Mitford (1612–1674) was an English politician who sat in the House of Commons in 1659.

Mitford was the son of Cuthbert Mitford, of Mitford, Northumberland. He was admitted at Sidney Sussex College, Cambridge, in 1634. He may have been admitted at Gray's Inn on 26 March 1634. In 1659, he was elected Member of Parliament for Morpeth in the Third Protectorate Parliament.

Mitford died at the age of about 62 and was buried at Mitford, Northumberland, on 28 June 1674.

Mitford married Philadelphia Wharton, daughter of Humphrey Wharton of Gillingwood, North Riding of Yorkshire.

Parliament of England
Preceded by Not represented in Second Protectorate Parliament	Member of Parliament for Morpeth; 1659; With: Robert Delaval	Succeeded by Not represented in Restored Rump
