= Sir Thomas Allen, 1st Baronet =

English politician and grocer

Sir Thomas Allen Bt
- Born: 1633
- Died: 15 December 1690 (aged 56–57)
- Occupations: Politician; Grocer

Sir Thomas Allen, 1st Baronet (c. 1633 – 15 December 1690) also spelt Aleyn or Alleyn, was an English politician and grocer.

He was the son of William Aleyn and his wife Elizabeth Compton, daughter of William Compton, and was educated at Oundle School. Allen was alderman of Cheap Ward from 1652 until 1660 and subsequently of Aldgate Ward until 1679. He then represented Bridge Without until 1683 and again from 1689 until his death a year later. Allen was appointed Sheriff of London in 1654 and Lord Mayor of London in 1659. He is remembered as the Lord Mayor who welcomed King Charles II of England into the City of London on 29 May 1660 after his exile, regarded by many as the pivotal episode in the Restoration of the monarchy. Allen was knighted on the king's visit and two weeks later, on 14 June, he was created a baronet, of London, in the County of Middlesex. In 1673, he was admitted to Gray's Inn and in 1676, he became Master of the Worshipful Company of Grocers.

Around 1648, he married Elizabeth Birch, and had by her a son. Allen died in 1690 and was buried in Totteridge. He was succeeded in the baronetcy by his son Thomas (1648–1730), who married Elizabeth Angell and had a son, Charles, who pre deceased him leaving only female issue. On his death the baronetcy became extinct.

Honorary titles
Preceded by Sir John Ireton	Lord Mayor of London; 1659–1660	Succeeded by Sir Richard Browne
Baronetage of England
New creation	Baronet (of London); 1660–1690	Succeeded by Thomas Allen
