= Robert Cuddon (died 1462) =

English politician

Robert Cuddon (died 1462), of Dunwich, Suffolk, was an English politician.

== Family ==
Cuddon was the son of MP, Peter Cuddon.

== Career ==
He was a member (MP) of the parliament of England for Dunwich in May 1421, 1426, 1442 and 1450.
