= Nicholas Barber (MP) =

Member of the Parliament of England

Nicholas Barber (fl. 1414–1421), of Dunwich, Suffolk, was a Member of Parliament for Dunwich in April 1414, 1419 and December 1421.
