= Sir Robert Kemp, 4th Baronet =

British landowner and Tory politician

Sir Robert Kemp, 4th Baronet (9 November 1699 – 1752), of Ubbeston, Suffolk, was a British landowner and Tory politician who sat in the House of Commons from 1730 to 1734.

Kemp was baptized at Hoxne, Suffolk, the only son of Sir Robert Kemp, 3rd Baronet of Ubbeston, Suffolk and his second wife Elizabeth Brand, daughter of John Brand of Edwardstone, Suffolk. He was admitted at Pembroke College, Cambridge on 3 July 1718 and at Middle Temple on 17 November 1721.

Kemp was returned as a Tory Member of Parliament for Orford at a by-election on 23 February 1730. He voted against the Government on all known occasions. He did not stand at the 1734 British general election.

Kemp succeeded his father in the baronetcy on 18 December 1734. He died unmarried on. 15 February 1752 and was buried in the family vault at Gissing, Norfolk. He was succeeded by his brother John Kemp.

Parliament of Great Britain
Preceded by Dudley North; William Acton	Member of Parliament for Orford; 1730–1734; With: William Acton	Succeeded by Richard Powys; Lewis Barlow
Baronetage of England
Preceded by Robert Kemp	Baronet (of Gissing); 1734-1752	Succeeded by John Kemp
