= Sir Robert Kemp, 2nd Baronet =

English politician

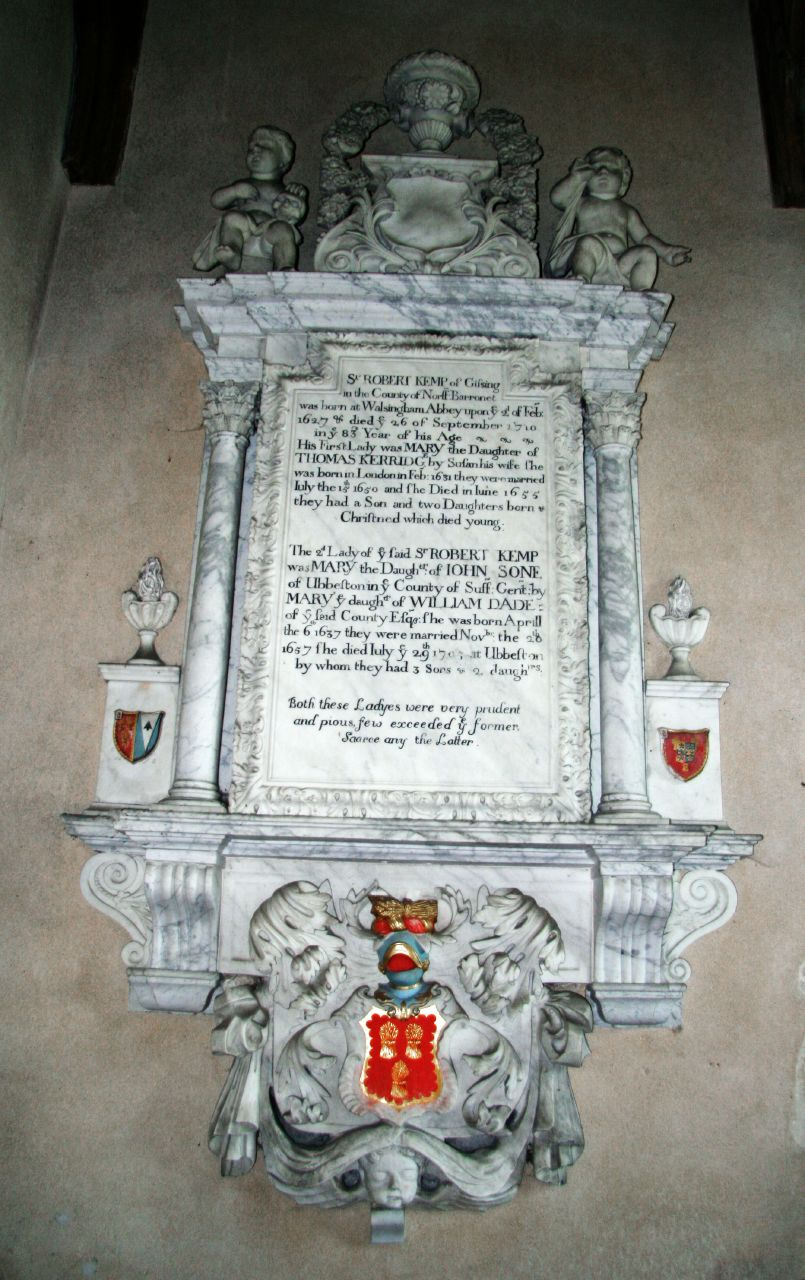
Memorial to Sir Robert Kemp by Edward Stanton, St Mary's church in Gissing

Sir Robert Kemp, 2nd Baronet (2 February 1627 – 26 September 1710), of Gissing Hall, Norfolk and Ubbeston, Suffolk, was an English politician who sat in the House of Commons between 1675 and 1685.

Kemp was born at Walsingham Abbey, Norfolk, the son of Sir Robert Kemp of Gissing, Norfolk, and his wife, Jane Browne, daughter of Sir Matthew Browne of Betchworth Castle, Surrey. He succeeded to the Baronetcy on the death of his father on 20 August 1647. He married firstly, Mary Kerridge, daughter of Thomas Kerridge, of Shelley Hall, Suffolk and his wife Susan, at St Bartholemew the Less, London, on 15 July 1650. She died without issue in June 1655 and he married secondly on 20 November 1657, Mary Sone, daughter of John Sone of Ubberston, Suffolk.

In 1675, Kemp was elected Member of Parliament for Norfolk in a by-election to the Cavalier Parliament. He was elected MP for Dunwich in the second election of 1679 and was re-elected in 1681.

Kemp's wife died at Ubberston on 29 July 1705, and was buried on 2 August at Gissing. Kemp died on 26 June 1710 at the age of 83, and was buried at Gissing. His memorial is by Edward Stanton.

He was succeeded in the baronetcy by his son Robert His daughter Mary married Sir Charles Blois, 1st Baronet.

Parliament of England
Preceded by Sir John Hobart, Bt; The Lord Cramond	Member of Parliament for Norfolk; 1675–1679; With: Sir John Hobart, Bt	Succeeded by Sir Christopher Calthorpe; Sir Neville Catelyn
Preceded by Thomas Allin; Sir Philip Skippon	Member of Parliament for Dunwich; 1679–1685; With: Sir Philip Skippon	Succeeded by Roger North; Thomas Knyvett
Baronetage of England
Preceded by Robert Kemp	Baronet (of Gissing); 1647-1710	Succeeded by Robert Kemp
