= Sir Robert Kemp, 3rd Baronet =

English landowner and Tory politician

Sir Robert Kemp, 3rd Baronet (1667–1734), of Hoxne and Ubbeston, Suffolk, was an English landowner and Tory politician who sat in the House of Commons between 1701 and 1734.

== Biography ==
Kemp was baptized at Ubbeston on 25 June 1667, the eldest son of Sir Robert Kemp, 2nd Baronet MP, of Gissing, Norfolk and his second wife Mary Sone, daughter of John Sone of Ubbeston. He was admitted at St Catharine's College, Cambridge on 23 May 1685. He married Letitia King, daughter of Robert King of Great Thurlow, Suffolk. After her death he married as his second wife Elizabeth Brand, daughter. of John Brand of Edwardstone, Suffolk in about 1699.

Kemp was returned unopposed as Member of Parliament for Dunwich on the family interest at the first general election of 1701 with his Tory brother-in-law Sir Charles Blois, Bt. He was returned unopposed again as Tory MP at the second general election of 1701. He voted on 26 February 1702 for the motion vindicating the proceedings of the Commons over the impeachment of the King's Whig ministers. He voted for the Tack on 28 November 1704. His mother died in 1705 and he did not stand at the 1705 English general election and left Hoxne to live with his father at Ubbeston. He stood again with Blois at the 1708 British general election at Dunwich and defeated two Whigs, but they were unseated on petition on 5 February 1709.

Kemp's second wife Elizabeth died in 1709 and his father, to whose estates and baronetcy he succeeded, died on 26 September 1710. He married as his third wife Martha Blackwell daughter of William Blackwell of Mortlake, Surrey. He was returned unopposed at Dunwich at the 1713 British general election, but lost the seat at the 1715 British general election

In 1727 Kemp's third wife Martha died and he married as his fourth wife Amy Burroughs, widow of John Burrough of Ipswich, daughter of Richard Phillips on 9 July 1728. He was returned unopposed as MP for Suffolk at a by-election on 9 February 1732. He voted against the Government on the Excise Bill in 1733 and for the repeal of the Septennial Act in 1734. At the 1734 British general election he was returned again unopposed for Suffolk, but did not survive more than a few months.

Kemp died at Ufford, Suffolk on 18 December 1734, after suddenly being taken ill in his coach on his way to Parliament. He had one daughter by his first wife, five sons and two daughters by his second wife, and three children by his third wife. He was succeeded in the baronetcy by his son Robert.

Parliament of England
Preceded by Henry Heveningham; Sir Charles Blois, Bt	Member of Parliament for Dunwich; 1701–1705; With: Sir Charles Blois, Bt	Succeeded by John Rous; Sir Charles Blois, Bt
Parliament of Great Britain
Preceded by John Rous; Sir Charles Blois, Bt	Member of Parliament for Dunwich; 1708–1709; With: Sir Charles Blois, Bt	Succeeded by Sir Richard Allin, Bt; Daniel Harvey
Preceded by Sir George Downing, Bt; Richard Richardson	Member of Parliament for Dunwich; 1713–1715; With: Sir George Downing, Bt	Succeeded by Sir Robert Rich, Bt; Charles Long
Preceded by Sir Jermyn Davers, Bt; Sir William Barker, Bt	Member of Parliament for Suffolk; 1732–1734; With: Sir Jermyn Davers, Bt	Succeeded by Sir Jermyn Davers, Bt; Sir Cordell Firebrace, Bt
Baronetage of England
Preceded by Robert Kemp	Baronet (of Gissing); 1710-1734	Succeeded by Robert Kemp
