= Peter Cuddon (fl. 1399–1410) =

English politician

Peter Cuddon (fl. 1399–1410), of Dunwich, Suffolk, was an English politician.

== Family ==
Cuddon was the son of Peter Cuddon, the brother of Robert Cuddon and father of another Robert Cuddon, all also MPs for Dunwich.

== Career ==
He was elected Member (MP) of the Parliament of England for Dunwich in 1399, and again in 1410.
