= Robert G. Kemp =

- Born: December 22, 1928; Toronto, Ontario, Canada
- Died: December 13, 1988 (aged 59)
- Education: Northern Vocational & Technical Institute, Banff School of Fine Arts
- Spouse: Barbara Flexman

Robert G. Kemp (December 22, 1928 – December 13, 1988) was a Canadian painter born in Toronto, Ontario.

== Education ==
Kemp began his art training at Northern Vocational & Technical Institute in Toronto, graduating in 1946. He then attended the Banff School of Fine Arts in 1947. Upon completion, Kemp went to work for Taber, Dulmage and Feheley art studios in Toronto. He continued his study of art by correspondence in the Famous Artists Course in Westport, Connecticut receiving feedback from Norman Rockwell.

== Career ==
Kemp became art director at Hayhurst Advertising in Toronto in 1954. In 1961, he became a self-employed artist drawing from the inspiration of David C. Baker, an artist in New Hampshire. He moved to a chalet at the base of Blue Mountain, Ontario and began selling paintings from a gallery attached to the chalet. Kemp had 12 exhibitions. His paintings have won 5 awards and can be found in the collections of the Tom Thomson Memorial Gallery in Owen Sound, Ontario and Princess Anne of the British royal family. In addition to 2 self-published books; "Places and Faces"(1972) and "Country Charms"(1976), the Blue Mountain Foundation for the Arts published a 25-year retrospective of the artist's works titled "Robert G. Kemp's Paintings and Drawings of Rural Ontario"(1983).

In 1990, following his death from a kidney disease, the Blue Mountain Foundation for the Arts created a trust fund for the annual Robert G. Kemp Arts Award to recognize and encourage artists in the southern Georgian Bay, Ontario region. The recipient receives $5,000 for a project proposal that benefits the community.

Kemp married Barbara Flexman in 1966 and had two boys, Christopher (1967) and Gordon (1970). Gordon is a member of the Canadian Artist Collective, Drawnonward. Christopher is a business teacher at Richmond Hill High School in Richmond Hill, Ontario.
