= Thomas Widdrington =

English judge and politician (died 1664)

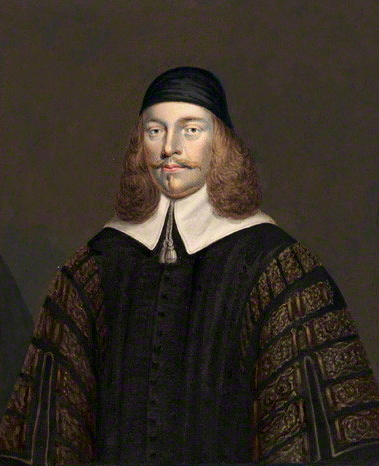
Sir Thomas Widdrington.

Sir Thomas Widdrington SL (died 13 May 1664) was an English judge and politician who sat in the House of Commons at various times between 1640 and 1664. He was the speaker of the House of Commons in 1656.

== Life ==
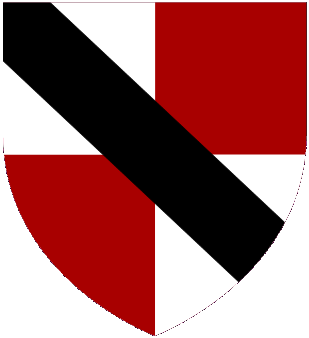
Shield of arms displayed at speaker's house.

Widdrington was the son of Lewis Mauntlaine, alias Widdrington of Cheeseburn Grange, near Stamfordham, Northumberland. He was a student at Christ's College, Cambridge in 1617 and was awarded BA in 1621. He entered Gray's Inn in 1619 and was called to the bar in 1625. He succeeded to the estate of his father in 1630. He was Recorder of Berwick from 1631 to 1658 and Recorder of York from 1638 to 1658. He was knighted at York on 1 April 1639.

In April 1640 Widdrington was elected Member of Parliament for Berwick in the Short Parliament. He was re-elected MP for Berwick for the Long Parliament in November 1640. As a barrister, his legal knowledge was useful during the English Civil War. In 1651 he was chosen as a member of the Council of State, although he had declined to have any share in the trial of the king. He was elected MP for York in 1654 for the First Protectorate Parliament. In 1656 he was elected MP for Northumberland in the Second Protectorate Parliament and was chosen as Speaker in September 1656, and in June 1658, he was appointed Lord Chief Baron of the Exchequer. In 1659 and again in 1660, he was a member of the Council of State, and on three occasions he was one of the Commissioners of the Great Seal. He lost some of his offices when Charles II was restored. In 1660, he was elected MP for York in the Convention Parliament. He was elected MP for Berwick again in 1661 for the Cavalier Parliament.

Widdrington founded a school at Stamfordham, Northumberland, He wrote Analecta Eboracensia; some Remaynes of the city of York which was not published until 1877, when it was edited with introduction and notes by the Rev. Caesar Caine.

Widdrington died in 1664.

== Family ==
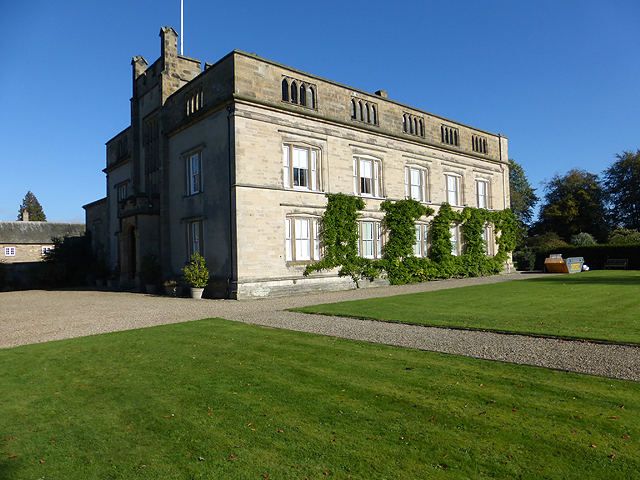
Cheeseburn Grange today

Widdrington married Frances Fairfax, a daughter of Ferdinando Fairfax, 2nd Lord Fairfax of Cameron and had five daughters, including Ursula, who married Thomas Hickman-Windsor, 1st Earl of Plymouth, and a son. However, his son Thomas died in 1660 when MP for Morpeth. The estate at Cheeseburn Grange passed briefly to Widdrington's brother Henry and then to their brother Ralph.

== Notes ==
Parliament of England
Preceded by No Parliament	Member of Parliament for Berwick; 1640–1653; With: Hugh Potter 1640/ Robert Scawen 1640–1653	Succeeded by Berwick not represented
Preceded by Thomas St. Nicholas	Member of Parliament for York; 1654–1656; With: Thomas Dickinson 1654–1656	Succeeded by Thomas Dickinson; John Geldert
Preceded by William Fenwick; Robert Fenwick; Henry Ogle	Member of Parliament for Northumberland; 1656–1659; With: William Fenwick; Robert Fenwick	Succeeded by Sir William Fenwick, Bt; Robert Fenwick
Preceded by John Rushworth; George Payler	Member of Parliament for Berwick; Apr 1660; With: John Rushworth	Succeeded by John Rushworth; Edward Grey
Preceded by Sir William Allanson; Thomas Hoyle	Member of Parliament for York; Jun 1660 – 1661; With: Sir Metcalfe Robinson, Bt	Succeeded by Sir Metcalfe Robinson, Bt; John Scott
Preceded by John Rushworth; Edward Grey	Member of Parliament for Berwick; 1661; With: Edward Grey	Succeeded by Edward Grey; Daniel Collingwood
Political offices
Preceded by William Lenthall	Speaker of the House of Commons; 1656–1658	Succeeded by Sir Bulstrode Whitelocke
Legal offices
Preceded by Sir William Steele	Lord Chief Baron of the Exchequer; 1658–1660	Succeeded by Sir John Wilde
