= Robert Cuddon (fl. 1395) =

English politician

Robert Cuddon (fl. 1395), of Dunwich, Suffolk, was an English politician.

== Family ==
Cuddon was the son of Peter Cuddon I and thus the brother of Peter Cuddon II. He was married and had at least one child, Richard Cuddon. All three men were also MPs.

== Career ==
He was a member (MP) of the parliament of England for Dunwich in 1395.
