= Henry Widdrington (died 1665) =

English politician

Henry Widdrington (died 5 December 1665) of Stamfordham, Northumberland was an English politician.

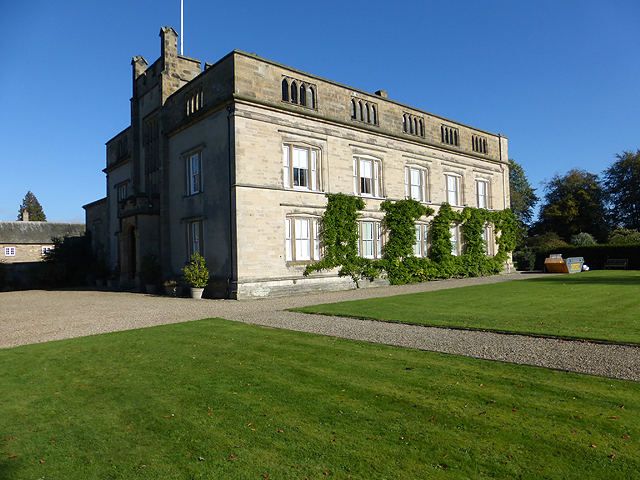
Cheeseburn Grange, Northumberland

He was the 2nd son of Lewis Mautlaine alias Widdrington of Cheeseburn Grange, Stamfordham. He served as a Royalist Major of Horse in 1642. His elder brother was Thomas Widdrington, a judge and Member of Parliament who was Speaker of the House of Commons.

He was a Member of Parliament (MP) for Morpeth from 1661 to his death in 1665. He was knighted before 21 January 1662 and succeeded his elder brother in 1664, briefly inheriting Cheeseburn Grange.

He had married in 1645 Mary, the daughter of John Swinburne and had 8 sons and 2 daughters. Cheeseburn Grange passed to his brother Ralph.

Parliament of England
Preceded by Ralph Knight with George Downing	Member of Parliament for Morpeth; 1660–1665; With: George Downing	Succeeded by George Downing with Edward Howard
