= Christopher Jenney =

Irish Anglican priest

Christopher Jenney was an Anglican priest in Ireland during the second half of the seventeenth century and the first decade of the eighteenth.

Jenney was born in County Dublin and educated Trinity College, Dublin. He was Prebendary of Mullaghbrack in Armagh Cathedral from 1674 to 1690; Archdeacon of Ossory from 1695 to 1700; and Prebendary of Rathmichael in St Patrick's Cathedral, Dublin from 1703 to 1707.
