= Sir George Downing, 1st Baronet =

Anglo-Irish statesman and diplomat (1623–1684)

Sir George Downing Bt
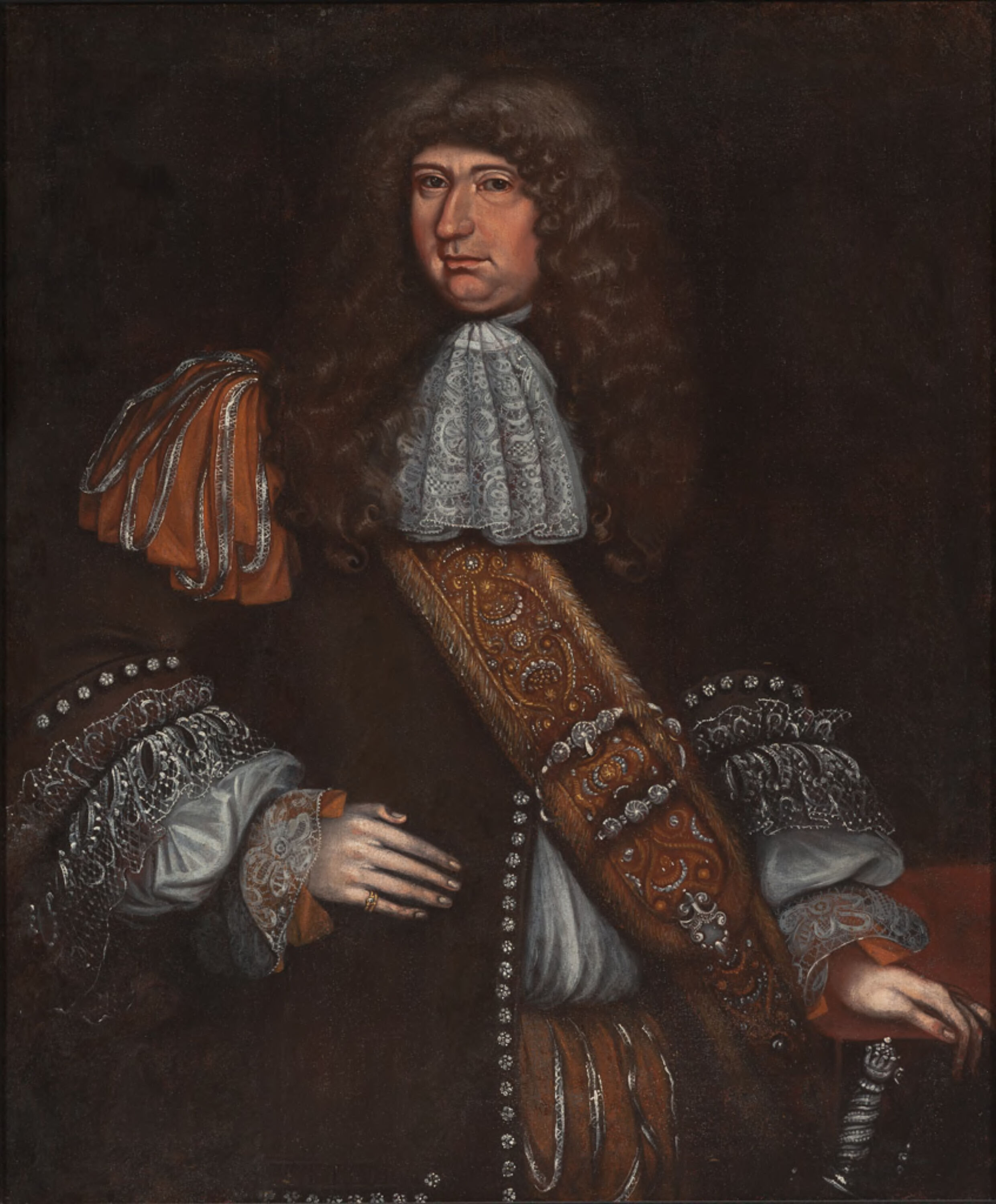
- Possible portrait by Thomas Smith, c. 1675–1690

Teller of the Exchequer
- In office 1660–1684

Ambassador to the Dutch Republic
- In office 1657–1665

Member of Parliament for Morpeth
- In office April 1660 – 1684

Member of Parliament for Carlisle
- In office 1656–1660

Member of Parliament for Edinburgh
- In office 1654–1656

Personal details
- Born: c. 1623 Dublin, Ireland
- Died: pr. 19 July 1684 (aged 59)
- Spouse: Frances Howard (m. 1654; died 1683)
- Children: 6, including Sir George Downing, 2nd Baronet
- Education: Harvard College
- Occupation: Statesman; Soldier; Diplomat; Spymaster; Preacher

Military service
- Allegiance: Commonwealth of England
- Commands: Scoutmaster-General of Commonwealth Forces in Scotland
- Battles/wars: Anglo-Scottish war (1650–1652); Dunbar; Worcester

Sir George Downing, 1st Baronet (c. 1623 – c. 19 July 1684) was an Anglo-Irish statesman and diplomat who held office first under the Commonwealth of England, then Charles II. As Teller of the Exchequer, he carried out major reforms in public finance, including securing passage of the Navigation Acts, intended to protect English maritime commerce, especially from the Dutch Republic. He played a significant role in acquiring New York City from the Dutch in 1665. Two New York streets are named after him, one in Greenwich Village and one in Brooklyn, as well as Downing Street, London.

== Personal details ==
George Downing was born c. 1623 in Dublin, Ireland, eldest son of Emmanuel Downing, and his second wife, Lucy Winthrop, younger sister of John Winthrop, Governor of Massachusetts Bay Colony. (Note: This is the generally accepted date and location, although some authors have suggested he was born in London in 1625.) His father was a barrister of the Inner Temple in London, and a Puritan who undertook missionary work, first in Ireland, and later in New England.

In 1654, he married Frances, sister of Charles Howard, 1st Earl of Carlisle and distantly related to the Duke of Norfolk, the leading Catholic family in England. They had a number of children, including his eldest son and heir George (c. 1656 – 15 April 1740), William (1663–1704), Charles (died 15 April 1740), Frances (died 1681), Philadelphia (died 8 March 1676), Mary (died 1728), and Lucy (died 1711).

== Early career ==
In 1636, he was in school in Maidstone, Kent. His family joined Winthrop in America in 1638, settling in Salem, Massachusetts. Downing attended Harvard College and ranked second out of nine students in the first graduating class of 1642. He was hired by Harvard as the college's first tutor. During his later life, he was frequently insulted because of his obscure origins and supposedly dubious New England education. In 1645, he moved to the West Indies as a preacher and instructor of sailors, and arrived in England some time afterwards, becoming chaplain in the regiment of Colonel John Okey, who had allegedly sponsored Downing's education in America.

== Service under Cromwell ==
The regicide Colonel John Okey; from 1646 to 1648, Downing served as chaplain in his regiment

Between 1647 and 1651, Downing pursued a military career, having abandoned preaching, and took part in the battles of Dunbar in 1650 and Worcester in 1651. In this period, he was a strong upholder of the republican cause and supported the execution of Charles I. He was appointed scoutmaster-general of Cromwell's forces in Scotland in November 1649, and as such received in 1657 an annual salary of £365 and, from 1656, he received £500 as a Teller of the Exchequer.

In 1654, Downing was elected Member of Parliament for Edinburgh, then for Carlisle in 1656 and 1659. His first diplomatic appointments were to France in 1655 to remonstrate on the massacre of the Protestant Vaudois and as envoy to the Duke of Savoy in 1656. In December 1657, he was appointed Ambassador to the Dutch Republic, resident at The Hague. Although in his earlier years, Downing was strongly anti-monarchical, he was one of the first to urge Cromwell to take the royal title and restore the old constitution.

As scoutmaster-general, Downing had been in charge of gathering intelligence and managing a network of spies. As English ambassador, Downing viewed intelligence gathering about Dutch intentions and Royalists plots as a major part of his function, tactics he later employed against regicides and other republicans there. Cromwell's aims were to effect a union of the Protestant European powers, to mediate between Portugal and the Dutch Republic and between Sweden and Denmark, but also to defend English commercial interests against Dutch competition. Political union between the two nations had already been rejected by the Dutch in 1654, as was a proposal for a military alliance against Spain in return for a promise to exempt the Netherlands from the provisions of the Navigation Act, but Cromwell persisted.

Although Downing was unable to realise Cromwell's plans during his first period in the Netherlands, he gained insight into the Dutch Republic's system of public finance. He applied the same principles in reforming royal finances during the early Restoration period of 1660 to 1665.

== Restoration ==
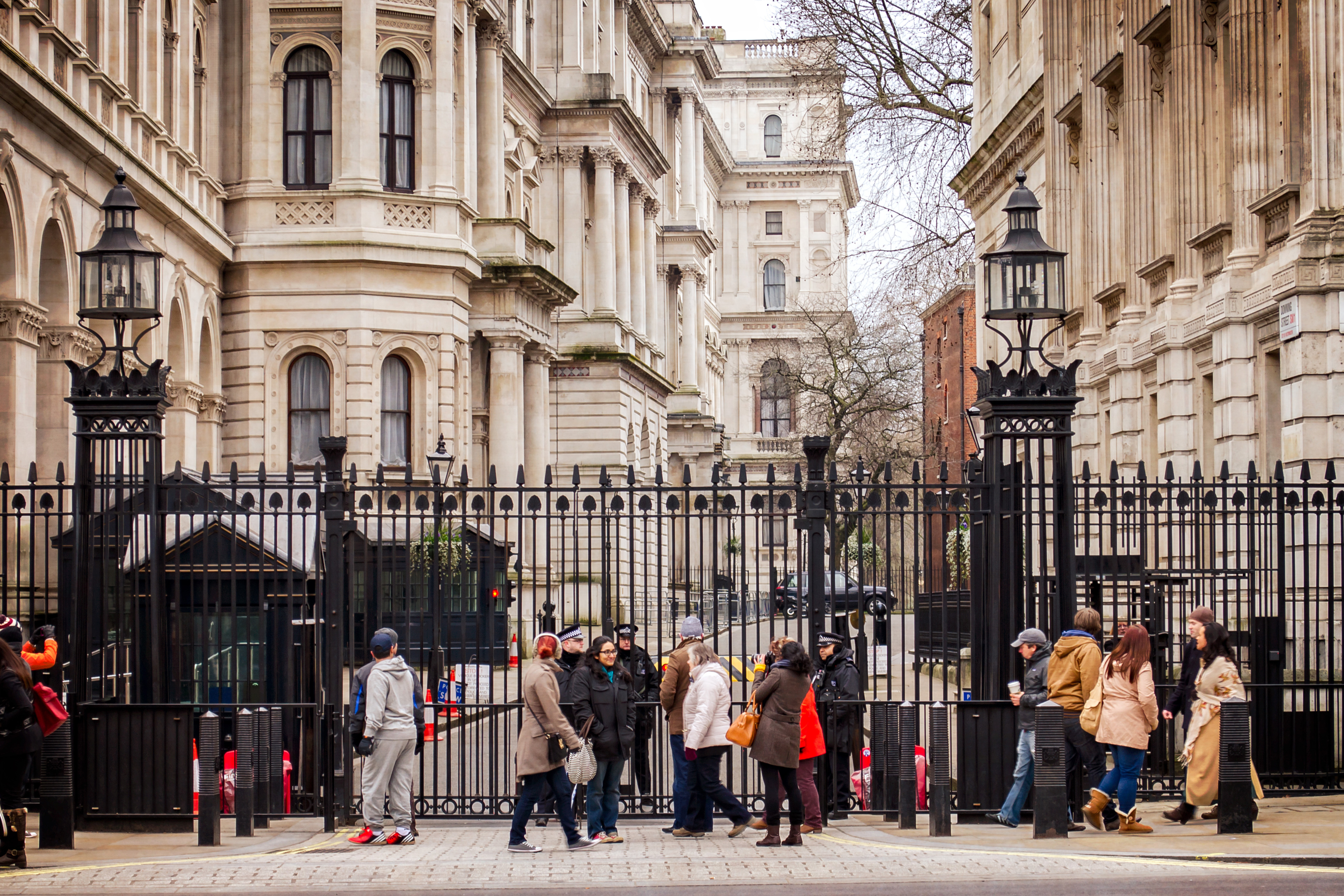
Downing Street, now Official residence of the Prime Minister, awarded to Downing in 1660

Downing showed himself to have been an able diplomat for the Protectorate, and kept his post during the period of political turmoil that followed the fall of Richard Cromwell in May 1659. As a Stuart Restoration became increasingly likely, he used this position to reconcile with Charles II. He did so first by leaking the contents of John Thurloe's despatches, then declaring his abandonment of "principles sucked in" in New England, of which he now "saw the error".

After Charles returned to England in May 1660 Stuart Restoration, Downing was knighted and reappointed to the embassy at The Hague. He was also confirmed as Teller of the Exchequer, and rewarded with a valuable piece of land adjoining St James's Park for building purposes, now known as Downing Street.

During the Restoration period, Downing was instrumental in organising the spy rings which hunted down many of his former comrades. He engineered the arrest in Holland of the regicides John Barkstead, Miles Corbet and his former commander and sponsor John Okey. Against considerable opposition from the Dutch, they were taken to England and executed. Samuel Pepys, who characterised his conduct as odious if useful to the king, calls him a "perfidious rogue", and remarks that "all the world took notice of him for a most ungrateful villain for his pains."

=== Embassy at The Hague ===
Downing returned to The Hague as ambassador in May 1661, where he had to deal with Johan de Witt, the Grand Pensionary of Holland, who controlled the foreign policy of the Netherlands. De Witt realised that his country could never win a war with England or France conclusively, and therefore worked for European neutrality in which Dutch commerce could flourish. In the aftermath of the Restoration, de Witt hoped that Charles II would be amenable to the negotiation of a defensive triple alliance between the Netherlands, England and France that would cover trade, maritime issues and defence. However, trade disputes and enactment of the English Navigation Act 1660 made agreement difficult, although Charles wished for at least a treaty of friendship.

Downing was a champion of English mercantilism, and therefore hostile to the Dutch, who were their chief commercial rivals. He had emphasised the importance of Baltic markets for English merchants to Thurloe during his first embassy, which had given him an insight into the economic policies of the Dutch government, and his intelligence network then had allowed him to discover how its traders were able to evade the Navigation Act 1651. This knowledge enabled Downing to be instrumental in strengthening and clarifying the provisions of the earlier act in the Navigation Act 1660.

Despite Dutch opposition to this legislation, they were willing to continue discussions, but were frustrated by English demands for them to honour certain provisions of the 1654 treaty that ended the First Anglo-Dutch War which the Dutch East India Company representatives in Asia had ignored and for compensation for English merchants' outstanding claims. The talks continued until early 1662, when Charles' improving financial position and Downing's advice not to offer concessions led to further English demands. The conclusion of a Franco-Dutch treaty including a defensive alliance in 1662, which gave the Netherlands protection against an English attack, ended the possibility of an Anglo-Dutch treaty that would settle outstanding differences, and the treaty signed in September 1662 satisfied neither government.

The existing commercial tensions between England and the Netherlands escalated between 1662 and 1664, involving English provocations in North America and West Africa. Although negotiations to avoid the outbreak of war took place throughout much of 1664, both sides refused to compromise what they considered were their vital interest. In 1664, Lord Arlington, gained royal favour and he and his client, Sir Thomas Clifford, began to cooperate with the king's brother James, Duke of York. The three men coordinated a policy of reprisals against Dutch ships, anticipating significant personal gains as a result.

Although Downing has been accused of being the principal cause of the deterioration of Anglo-Dutch relations, it appears he did not initiate policies, but acted on instructions from Arlington and Clifford. In turn, Charles II, without explicitly endorsing war with the Netherlands, used Clifford and Downing to further his plans to gain advantages from the Dutch even if this policy risked war.

Downing also consistently reported to London in 1664 and 1665 that the Dutch Republic was politically divided and would submit to English demands rather than go to war. Even after the Royal Navy began seizing Dutch ships and attacked their possessions in West Africa, he claimed in August 1664 that the Dutch would probably accept this, although contemporary Dutch sources reported growing resistance to these provocations. Downing had been in contact with the Orangists since 1661 and believed they would collaborate with England against their republican enemies. He used Henri de Fleury de Coulan de Buat in an attempt to procure an Orangist coup in an attempt to end the war and overthrow de Witt, but de Buat's treasonable correspondence with England was discovered, leading to his rapid arrest, trial and execution.

During the summer of 1664, Louis XIV attempted to avert the threatened Anglo-Dutch war or, failing that, to confine it to Africa and America. These efforts to mediate an agreement failed, and the war commenced with a declaration of war by the Dutch on 4 March 1665, following English attacks on two Dutch convoys off Cadiz and in the English Channel. After the declaration of war, both Downing and the Dutch ambassador in London remained at their posts until Downing was expelled later in 1665 for organising espionage.

Downing combined the roles of parliamentarian and diplomat, so was close to the centres of English decision-making. He represented a king who was financially weak and not in full control of his parliaments against a wealthy Dutch state in which de Witt had considerable control over finance and foreign affairs, even if this ultimately required the consent of a majority of the Dutch provinces. His main failing in following the agenda of Arlington and Duke of York is that he did not realise until too late that there were limits to the concessions that the Dutch were prepared to make, and that at some point English provocations would lead to war, not to the desired concessions. He also underestimated the Dutch willingness to accept the heavy financial burden of a war to protect their trade. De Witt also failed to realise the strength of English feeling against the Netherlands, although neither he nor Downing can be wholly blamed for not preventing the outbreak of the Second Anglo-Dutch War, when its roots lay in the unsatisfactory conclusion to the First Anglo-Dutch War in 1654.

=== Capture of New York ===
The Treaty of Hartford (1650), which was supposed to define the boundary between the Dutch colony of New Netherland and the English one of Connecticut, had been made between the governors of these two colonies and, while accepted by each colony's administration and the Dutch West India Company as reflecting the reality of expanding English settlement, it was not ratified by the English government, which disputed Dutch claims to the western half of Long Island and to the territory east of the Hudson River. During the First Anglo-Dutch War, a force of New England colonial militia was assembled to attack the New Netherland settlements, but the war ended before it began its campaign.

During the remainder of the Protectorate and in the first years of the Restoration, the status quo of the Hartford Treaty remained in force, although the presence of the New Netherland colony allowed settlers in the English colonies to sell their produce to Dutch traders in defiance of legal restrictions. During the period from 1657 to 1664, Downing, with his New England background and residency in The Hague, was ideally placed to advise Charles II on the political situation in North America and the Dutch Republic. Charles and his Lord Chancellor, the Earl of Clarendon, faced with the Dutch delays in implementing the terms of the 1654 peace, widespread smuggling operations based on New Amsterdam and the exclusion of English traders from the East Indies and West Africa, decided to assert English claims to New Netherland, and to use Downing as their agent to claim to de Witt that Charles was merely asserting his rights, not making a declaration of war.

Downing was one of the individuals said to be well acquainted with the affairs of New England that advised the Council for Foreign Plantations in January 1664 to attack New Amsterdam in support of the claim of Connecticut to land to the west of the 1650 boundary, and he supported the dispatch of a naval and military force to support the local militias to capture that town.

=== Parliamentary career ===
Downing was returned for Morpeth in the Convention Parliament of April 1660, a constituency that he represented in every ensuing parliament till his death, and he spoke with ability on financial and commercial questions.

In 1665, after his expulsion from the Netherlands and as a member of parliament, Downing attached a clause to a bill to fund the war's continuation that specified that the money could only be used for the war effort. This previously little-used move, opposed strongly by Lord Clarendon as an encroachment on the royal prerogative, effectively made permanent the parliamentary appropriation of supplies (meaning that Parliament gained the right to specify that tax revenues should be used only for a particular purpose, rather than spent as the King's government saw fit). In May 1667, in the war's final year, Downing was made secretary to the commissioners of the treasury, his appointment being much welcomed by Pepys, and he took part in the management and reform of the Treasury.

He was appointed a commissioner of the customs in 1671. The same year he was again sent to Holland to replace Sir William Temple, to break up the policy of the Triple Alliance and incite another war between the Dutch Republic and England in furtherance of the French policy. His unpopularity there was extreme, and after three months' residence, Downing fled to England, in fear of the fury of the mob. For this unauthorised step, he was sent to the Tower of London on 7 February 1672, then released a few weeks afterwards. He defended the Royal Declaration of Indulgence the same year, and made himself useful in supporting the court policy.

== Death and legacy ==
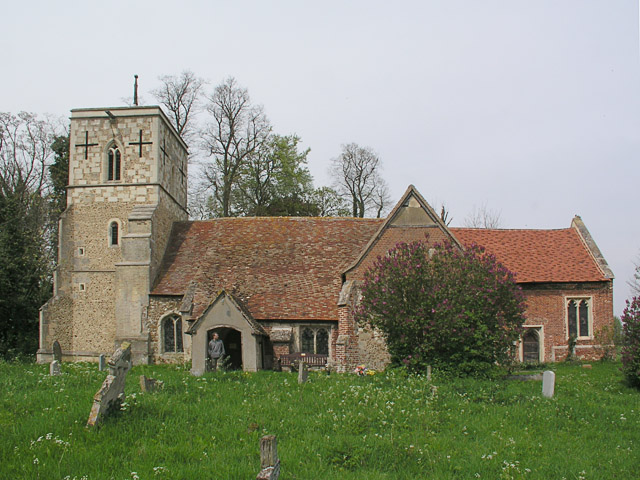
Downing was buried in a vault he had built in All Saints' Church, Croydon, Cambridgeshire

His wife Frances died on 10 July 1683, followed by Downing himself a year later, with probate granted on 19 July 1684. He was buried in the family vault built in All Saints' Church, Croydon, Cambridgeshire, leaving a substantial fortune, which critics claimed he had amassed partly through his exceptional meanness about money. This characteristic was echoed by Samuel Pepys, although Downing's rise was considered undesirable in a generally conservative society, and an achievement that generated suspicion and envy.

Despite his undoubted political, diplomatic, and financial ability, Downing has often been maligned due to his willingness to betray former comrades in order to win favour from his current masters. His modern reputation is undergoing a revision as his contributions in the fields of financial reform and diplomacy are again recognised.

He published a large number of declarations and discourses, mostly in Dutch, enumerated in Sibley's biography, and wrote also "A True Relation of the Progress of the Parliament's Forces in Scotland" (1651), Thomason Tracts, Brit. Mus., E 640 (5).

== Sources ==
- Burke, John (1914). Genealogical and Heraldic Dictionary of the Peerage and Baronetage of the British Empire. Burke's Peerage Limited. p. 382.
- Downing, Roger; Rommelse, Gijs (2011). A Fearful Gentleman: Sir George Downing in The Hague, 1658–1672. Verloren. ISBN 978-9087042516.
- Jordan, Don; Walsh, Michael (2012). The King's Revenge; Charles II and the greatest manhunt in British history. Little, Brown. ISBN 978-1408703274.
- Maitland, Frederic William (1908). The Constitutional History of England: A Course of Lectures. Cambridge University Press. pp. 309–310. ISBN 9781584771487.
- Muskett, Joseph James (1900). Suffolk Manorial Families, Being the County Visitations and Other Pedigrees. W. Pollard. p. 99.
- Rommelse, Gijs (2006). The Second Anglo-Dutch War (1665–1667). Verloren. ISBN 9789065509079.
- Roper, L. H (2014). "The Fall of New Netherland and Seventeenth-Century Anglo-American Imperial Formation, 1654-1676". The Quarterly. 87 (4): 666–708. JSTOR 43286385.
- Scott, Jonathan (2004). "Downing, Sir George (1623–1684)". Oxford Dictionary of National Biography (online ed.). Oxford University Press. doi:10.1093/ref:odnb/7981. (Subscription, Wikipedia Library access or UK public library membership required.)
- Scott, Jonathan (2003). "'Good Night Amsterdam': Sir George Downing and Anglo-Dutch Statebuilding". The English Historical Review. 118 (476): 334. doi:10.1093/ehr/118.476.334.
- Sewell, Dennis (2025). Turncoat: Roundhead to Royalist, the Double Life of Cromwell's Spy. Atlantic Books. ISBN 978-1-786-49825-0.
- Shipton, Clifford Kenyon (1873). Sibley's Harvard Graduates: Biographical Sketches of Those who Attended Harvard College. Massachusetts Historical Society. p. 28.
- Timpson, Trevor (7 March 2012). "How a king's judges were hunted down". BBC.

Parliament of England
Preceded by Thomas Widdrington; Ralph Knight	Member of Parliament for Morpeth with Ralph Knight 1660–1661; Henry Widdrington 1661–1666; Viscount Morpeth 1666–1679; Daniel Collingwood 1679–1684; 1660–1684	Succeeded by Sir Henry Pickering, Bt; Theophilus Oglethorpe
Political offices
Unknown	Teller of the Exchequer; 1660?–1684	Succeeded by Simon Clifford
Baronetage of England
New creation	Baronet (of East Hatley); 1663–1684	Succeeded by George Downing
