= Dunwich (constituency) =

Parliamentary constituency in the United Kingdom, 1801–1832

- Former borough constituency for the House of Commons

1296–1832
- Seats: Two
- Replaced by: East Suffolk

Dunwich was a parliamentary borough in Suffolk, one of the most notorious of all the rotten boroughs. It elected two Members of Parliament (MPs) to the House of Commons from 1296 until 1832, when the constituency was abolished by the Great Reform Act.

== History ==
In 1296, when Dunwich was first accorded representation in Parliament, it was a flourishing port and market town about thirty miles (50 km) from Ipswich. However, by 1670 the sea had encroached upon the town, destroying the port and swallowing up all but a few houses so that nothing was left but a tiny village. The borough had once consisted of eight parishes, but all that was left was part of the parish of All Saints, Dunwich – which by 1831 had a population of 232, and only 44 houses ("and half a church", as Oldfield recorded in 1816).

In fact, this made Dunwich by no means the smallest of England's rotten boroughs, but the symbolism of two Members of Parliament representing a constituency that was essentially underwater captured the imagination and made Dunwich one of the most frequently-mentioned examples of the absurdities of the unreformed system.

The right to vote was exercised by the freemen of the borough. Originally, these freemen could vote even if they did not live in the borough, and at times this was abused as elsewhere, notably in 1690 when 500 non-resident freemen were created to swamp the resident voters. From 1709, however, by a resolution of the House of Commons, the franchise was restricted to resident freemen who were not receiving alms. By the 19th century, the maximum number of freemen had been set at 32, of whom the two "patrons", Lord Huntingfield and Snowdon Barne, could nominate eight each, so that between them they controlled half of the votes and needed only one other voter to gain control of elections.

Earlier, in the 1760s, Sir Jacob Downing had been the sole patron, but in theory he also was considered to have only influence, rather than the absolute power to dictate the choice of the Members. Unsurprisingly, in 1754 Downing was able to occupy one seat himself and sell the choice of the other member to the Duke of Newcastle (then Prime Minister) for £1,000; it is not recorded whether he needed to share some of this largesse with his co-operative voters.

Dunwich was abolished as a constituency in 1832, when what remained of the village became part of the new Eastern Suffolk county division.

== Members of Parliament ==
=== Before 1660 ===
Parliament	First member	Second member
1306	Robert Codoun	
1332	Geoffrey Cuddon	
1372	Peter Cuddon I	
1373	Peter Cuddon I	
1383	Peter Cuddon I	
1386	Peter Cuddon I	Hugh Thorpe
1388 (Feb)	Augustine Knight	William Woodward
1388 (Sep)	Peter Cuddon I	John Bagge
1390 (Jan)	Peter Cuddon I	Robert Runton
1390 (Nov)		
1391	Robert Runton	William Havene
1393	Robert Cook	Augustine Knight
1394		
1395	Robert Cuddon I	William Chock
1397 (Jan)	Peter Helmeth	Nicholas Goodber
1397 (Sep)		
1399	Peter Cuddon II	Peter Helmeth
1401		
1402		
1404 (Jan)		
1404 (Oct)		
1406		
1407		
1410	Peter Cuddon II	William Barber
1411	Richard Griston	Thomas Clerk
1413 (Feb)		
1413 (May)	Thomas Clerk	Thomas Brantham
1414 (Apr)	Nicholas Barber	Philip Canon
1414 (Nov)	Thomas James	Philip Canon
1415		
1416 (Mar)		
1416 (Oct)	John Luke	Philip Canon
1417		
1419	Nicholas Barber	Philip Canon
1420	John Luke	Richard Russell
1421 (May)	William Barber	Robert Cuddon II
1421 (Dec)	John Luke	Nicholas Barber
1467	William Rabett	
1472	William Rabett (Rabbes)	
1478	Robert Brewes	Edmund Jenny
1510–1523	No names known	
1529	Sir William Rous	Christopher Jenney
1536	?	
1539	?	
1542	Robert Browne	George Coppyn
1545	Robert Browne	Robert Coppyn
1547	Robert Coppyn	John Harrison alias Hall died and was repl. Nov 1548 by Thomas Heydon
1553 (Mar)	Francis Yaxley	Robert Coppyn
1553 (Oct)	Robert Coppyn	Nicholas Hasborough
1554 (Apr)	Robert Browne	George Jerningham
1554 (Nov)	Sir Edmund Rous	Robert Coppyn
1555	George Saxmundham	Andrew Green
1558	Thomas Pycto	John Browne
1558–9	Sir Edmund Rous	Gregory Coppyn
1562–3	Robert Hare	Robert Coppyn
1571	William Humberstone	Arthur Hopton
1572	Robert Coppyn, died and repl.1576 by Godfrey Foljambe	Richard Sone
1584	Walter Dunch	Anthony Wingfield
1586	Anthony Wingfield	Arthur Melles
1588	Edward Honing	Walter Dunch
1593	Henry Savile	Thomas Corbet
1597	Arthur Atye	Clipsby Gawdy
1601	John Suckling	Francis Myngate
1604	Sir Valentine Knightley elected to sit for Northamptonshire and replaced by Thomas Smythe	Philip Gawdy
1614	Philip Gawdy	Henry Dade
1621	Clement Coke	Thomas Bedingfield
1624	Sir John Rous	Sir Robert Brooke
1625	Sir John Rous	Sir Robert Brooke
1626	Sir John Rous	Thomas Bedingfield
1628	Sir Robert Brooke	Francis Winterton
1629–1640	No Parliaments summoned	

=== 1640–1832 ===
Year	First member	First party	Second member	Second party
1640 (Apr)	Henry Coke		Anthony Bedingfield	
1640 (Nov)	Henry Coke- disabled		Anthony Bedingfield	
1645	Anthony Bedingfield		Robert Brewster	
1648 (Rump)	Robert Brewster		One seat only	
1653 (Barebones)	Dunwich not represented in Barebones Parliament			
1654 (1st Protectorate)	Robert Brewster		One seat only	
1656 (2nd Protectorate)	Francis Brewster		One seat only	
1658 (3rd Protectorate)	Robert Brewster		John Barrington	
1660	Sir John Rous	Tory	Henry Bedingfield	Tory
1661	Sir John Rous	Tory	Richard Coke	Tory
1670	Sir John Rous	Tory	Sir John Pettus	Tory
1671	William Wood	Whig	Sir John Pettus	Tory
1678	Thomas Allin	Tory	Sir John Pettus	Tory
February 1679	Thomas Allin	Tory	Sir Philip Skippon	Whig
September 1679	Sir Robert Kemp, Bt	Country Party	Sir Philip Skippon	Whig
1685	Roger North	Tory	Thomas Knyvett	Tory
1689	Sir Philip Skippon	Whig	Sir Robert Rich, Bt	Whig
1691	John Bence	Tory	Sir Robert Rich, Bt	Whig
1695	Henry Heveningham	Whig	Sir Robert Rich, Bt	Whig
1700	Henry Heveningham	Whig	Sir Charles Blois, Bt	Tory
1701	Robert Kemp, Bt	Tory	Sir Charles Blois, Bt	Tory
1705	John Rous		Sir Charles Blois, Bt	Tory
1708	Robert Kemp	Tory	Sir Charles Blois, Bt	Tory
1709	Sir Richard Allin, Bt	Whig	Daniel Harvey	Whig
1710	Sir George Downing, Bt		Richard Richardson	Tory
1713	Sir George Downing, Bt		Sir Robert Kemp, Bt	Tory
1715	Sir Robert Rich, Bt	Whig	Charles Long	
March 1722	Sir George Downing, Bt		Edward Vernon	Tory
December 1722	Sir George Downing, Bt		Sir John Ward	Whig
1726	Sir George Downing, Bt		John Sambrooke	
1727	Sir George Downing, Bt		Thomas Wyndham	
1734	Sir George Downing, Bt		Sir Orlando Bridgeman, Bt	Whig
1738	Sir George Downing, Bt		William Morden	Whig
1741	Sir George Downing, Bt		Jacob Downing	
1747	Sir George Downing, Bt		Miles Barne	
1749	Sir Jacob Downing, Bt		Miles Barne	
1754	Sir Jacob Downing, Bt		Soame Jenyns	
1758	Sir Jacob Downing, Bt		Alexander Forrester	
1761	Henry Fox	Whig	Eliab Harvey	
1763	Sir Jacob Downing, Bt		Eliab Harvey	
1764	Miles Barne	Pittite	Eliab Harvey	
1768	Miles Barne	Pittite	Gerard Vanneck	
1777	Barne Barne	Pittite	Gerard Vanneck	
1790	Barne Barne	Pittite	The Lord Huntingfield	Pittite
1791	Miles Barne	Pittite	The Lord Huntingfield	Pittite
1796	Snowdon Barne	Pittite	The Lord Huntingfield	Pittite
1812	Michael Barne		The Lord Huntingfield	Pittite
1816	Michael Barne		The Lord Huntingfield	Tory
1819	Michael Barne		William Alexander Mackinnon	Whig
1820	Michael Barne		George Henry Cherry	
1826	Michael Barne		Andrew Arcedeckne	
1830	Frederick Barne		Andrew Arcedeckne	
1831	Frederick Barne		Earl of Brecknock	Tory
1832	Frederick Barne		Viscount Lowther	Tory
1832	Constituency abolished			

== In popular culture ==
Dunwich is satirised in an episode of the British television show Blackadder the Third titled "Dish and Dishonesty". Named Dunny-on-the-Wold, and like Dunwich, described as being located in Suffolk, it has a population of three cows, a dachshund called Colin, and "a small hen in its late forties"; only one person lives there and he is the voter. After an obviously rigged election (in which it is revealed that Blackadder is both the constituency's returning officer and voter, after both his predecessors had died in highly suspicious "accidents"), Baldrick is made an MP having received all 16,472 of the votes cast.
