= Robert Delaval =

English politician

Robert Delaval (born c. 1600) was an English politician who sat in the House of Commons in 1659.

Delaval was the son and heir of Ralph Delaval of Seaton Delaval, Northumberland. He entered Lincoln's Inn in 1619 and matriculated at University College, Oxford on 23 June 1621. In 1659, he was elected Member of Parliament for Morpeth.

Delaval was the father of Sir Ralph Delaval, 1st Baronet, MP for Northumberland.

Parliament of England
Preceded by Not represented in Second Protectorate Parliament	Member of Parliament for Morpeth; 1659; With: Robert Mitford	Succeeded by Not represented in Restored Rump
