= Sir Thomas Alen, 1st Baronet =

Irish Baronet

Alen baronets of St. Wolstans
- Escutcheon of the Alen baronets of St. Wolstans
- Creation date: 1622
- Status: extinct
- Extinction date: 1627

Sir Thomas Alen, 1st Baronet (c. 1566 – 7 March 1627) was the eldest son of John Alen (d. 29 September 1616) of St. Wolstan's, near Celbridge, County Kildare and Anne, daughter of Thomas Dillon of Riverstown, County Meath. He was the grandnephew of John Alan, Lord Chancellor of Ireland, who acquired St Wolstan's on the dissolution of the monasteries.

He was created a baronet, of St Wolstan's in the County of Kildare, in the Baronetage of Ireland on 7 June 1622, for the services rendered by his long-dead great-uncle, Archbishop John Alen, and also a payment to the Crown (baronetcies were largely a money-making device). He was invested as a Knight on 8 June 1622.

He married, firstly,

- Mary Fleming, daughter of William Fleming, 11th Baron Slane, and his wife and cousin Elinor Fleming, after 1616.

He married, secondly,

- Mary Preston, daughter of Jenico Preston, 5th Viscount Gormanston and his wife Margaret St. Lawrence, daughter of Nicholas St Lawrence, 9th Baron Howth, after 1623.

He died on 7 March 1626/27, without issue, and was buried in the family vault in Donaghcumper Church, Celbridge. His will (dated 1 March 1626) was probated on 18 April 1627. On his death, his baronetcy became extinct. His estates passed to the heirs of his brother Nicholas.

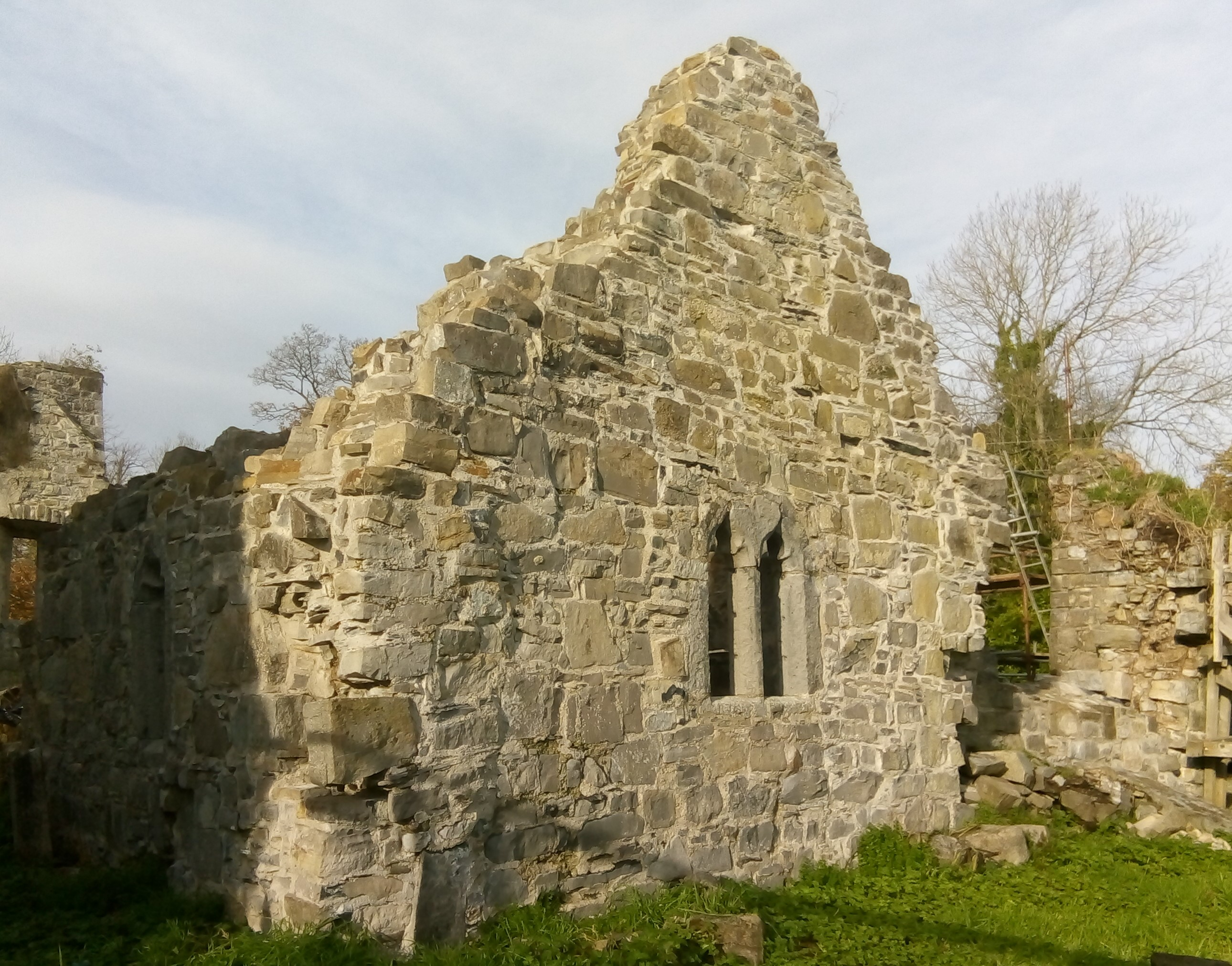
Ruins of Donaghcumper Church where Sir Thomas was buried in the Alen family vault

He should not be confused with Sir Thomas Allen, 1st Baronet, of Totteridge, Middlesex.

== Sources ==
- Ball, F. Elrington The Judges in Ireland 1221-1921 John Murray London 1926

Baronetage of Ireland
New creation	Baronet (of St Wolstans); 1622–1627	Extinct
