= Daniel Collingwood =

English soldier and politician

Daniel Collingwood (c. 1634 – 3 April 1681) was an English soldier and politician.

The son of Sir Robert Collingwood of Branton and Margaret Delaval, he was educated at Warkworth and Cambridge, and was commissioned in the Duke of Albemarle's (later, the Queen's) Troop of Life Guards, commanded by Sir Philip Howard, upon its raising in 1661. He was a Member of Parliament (MP) for Berwick-upon-Tweed from 1665 and Morpeth in late 1679, re-elected in 1681. He succeeded his father as governor of Holy Island and Keeper of the Castle of Lindisfarne,

He died in 1681, aged approximately 47, and was buried in Westminster Abbey.

Parliament of England
Preceded by George Downing with Edward Howard	Member of Parliament for Morpeth; 1679–1681; With: George Downing	Succeeded by Henry Pickering with Theophilus Oglethorpe
