= Dannen =

Dannen is a surname. Notable people with the surname include:

- Dannen Francis (born 2004), Antiguan footballer
- Fredric Dannen, American journalist and author
- Funny van Dannen (born 1958), German singer-songwriter

== See also ==
- Danne
- Deneen
- Dineen
- Dinneen
- Dennen (disambiguation)
