= Downing House =

Downing House may refer to:

- T. B. Downing House, Palo Alto, California, listed on the National Register of Historic Places (NRHP) in Santa Clara County
- Rogers–Downing House, Andover, Massachusetts, listed on the NRHP
- Downing House (Memphis, Missouri), listed on the NRHP in Missouri
- Lewis Downing Jr. House, Concord, New Hampshire, listed on the NRHP in Merrimack County
- John Downing Jr. House, Middleport, Ohio, listed on the NRHP
- Hunt Downing House, Exton, Pennsylvania, listed on the NRHP
