= Downing =

Downing may refer to:

== Places ==
- Downing, Missouri, US, a city
- Downing, Wisconsin, US, a village
- Downing Park (Newburgh, New York), US, a public park
- Downing, Flintshire, Wales

== Buildings ==
- Downing Centre, Sydney, New South Wales, Australia, a major courthouse complex
- Downing Hall, near Whitford, Flintshire, Wales
- Downing House (disambiguation), various houses on the US National Register of Historic Places
- Downing Stadium, New York City, US, a sports stadium closed in 2002

== People ==
- Downing (surname)
- Downing Gray (born 1938), American amateur golfer
- Downing Vaux (1856–1926), American landscape architect

== Transportation ==
- Downing Street, London, UK
- Downing Street, George Town, Penang, Malaysia
- Downing station, Downing, Missouri, US, a train station on the National Register of Historic Places
- Downing Motor Company, which manufactured the Downing-Detroit cyclecar from 1913 to 1915

== Other uses ==
- Downing College, Cambridge, UK
- Downing baronets, an extinct title in the Baronetage of England
- Clayton Downing Middle School, Flower Mound, Texas, US

== See also ==
- Downing Professor of the Laws of England, a University of Cambridge professorship
- Downing Professor of Medicine, a University of Cambridge professorship
- Downings, County Donegal, Ireland, a village and townland
