= Deneen =

Deneen is a surname and given name. Notable people with the name include:

== Surname ==
- Bina Deneen (1868–1950), wife of Charles
- Charles S. Deneen (1863–1940), American politician from Illinois
- Matthew Deneen (born 1968), American politician
- Patrick Deneen (skier) (born 1987), American freestyle skier
- Patrick Deneen (author) (born 1964), American political philosopher

== Given name ==
- Deneen Borelli (born 1964), American author, radio and television personality, and columnist
- Deneen Graham (born 1964), American dance teacher
- Leeah Deneen Jackson (born 1998), American actress
- Dante Deneen Washington (born 1970), American soccer player

== See also ==
- Dannen
- Dennen (disambiguation)
- Dineen
- Dinneen
