= Dennen =

Dennen is a surname. Notable people with the surname include:

- Brett Dennen (born 1979), American singer-songwriter
- Barry Dennen (1938–2017), American actor, singer, writer
- Alfie Dennen, British technologist
- George E. Dennen (1884–1966), American reporter and politician
- Lyle Dennen, British Anglican priest

== Other ==
- Camp Dennen, found on the shores of Hedges Pond (Plymouth, Massachusetts)

== See also ==
- Deneen
- Dineen
- Dinneen
- Dannen
