= Dunning (surname) =

Dunning is a surname. Notable people with the surname include:

- Brian Dunning (cricketer) (1940–2008), New Zealand cricketer
- Brian Dunning (flautist) (1951–2022), Irish jazz flute player
- Brian Dunning (author) (born 1965), American writer, producer and podcast host
- Charles T. Dunning (1843–1916), Clerk of the New York State Senate
- Charles Avery Dunning (1885–1958), Canadian businessman, politician and university chancellor
- Charles Dunning (rugby) (died 1955), rugby league player
- Dane Dunning (born 1994), American baseball player
- Darren Dunning (born 1981), English footballer
- David Dunning, American social psychologist
- Debbe Dunning (born 1966), American actress
- Edwin Harris Dunning (1892–1917), British naval pilot, first to land an aircraft on a moving ship
- Eric Dunning (1936–2019), British sociologist
- George Dunning (1920–1979), British animator
- Henry Dunning Moore (1817–1887), American politician
- Henry Dunning Macleod (1821–1902), Scottish economist
- Jack Dunning (1903–1971), New Zealand cricketer
- Jake Dunning (born 1988), American baseball player
- Jeanne Dunning (born 1960), American photographer
- John Dunning (disambiguation), several people
- Matt Dunning (born 1978), Canadian rugby union player who played for Australia
- Nick Dunning (born 1959), English actor
- Paris C. Dunning (1806–1884), American politician, governor of Indiana
- Philo Dunning (1819–1900), American businessman and politician
- Robert Dunning (born 1997), American hurdler
- Steve Dunning (born 1949), American baseball player
- Thomas Dunning (1799–1873), English trade unionist
- Thom Dunning Jr., American chemist
- William Archibald Dunning (1857–1922), American historian and political scientist for whom the Dunning School of Reconstruction historiography is named
- Willie Dunning (1865–1902), Scottish footballer

== See also ==
- Downing (surname)
