= George Downing =

George Downing may refer to:

- George Downing (politician) (1584–c. 1659), pioneer English settler in Ireland
- Sir George Downing, 1st Baronet (1623–1684), Anglo-Irish soldier and diplomat after whom Downing Street in London is named
- Sir George Downing, 2nd Baronet (c. 1656–1711), Teller of the Receipt of the Exchequer
- Sir George Downing, 3rd Baronet (1685–1749), British politician
- George Downing (businessman) (born 1963), British entrepreneur
- George Henry Downing (1819–1903), British businessman, chairman of G.H. Downing & Co.
- George T. Downing (1819–1903), American abolitionist and civil rights activist
- George Downing (coach) (1897–1973), American football, basketball and baseball coach
- George Downing (surfer) (1930–2018), American surfer

== See also ==
- Downing (disambiguation)
