= Ammadelle =

Historic house in Mississippi, United States

- U.S. National Register of Historic Places
- U.S. National Historic Landmark
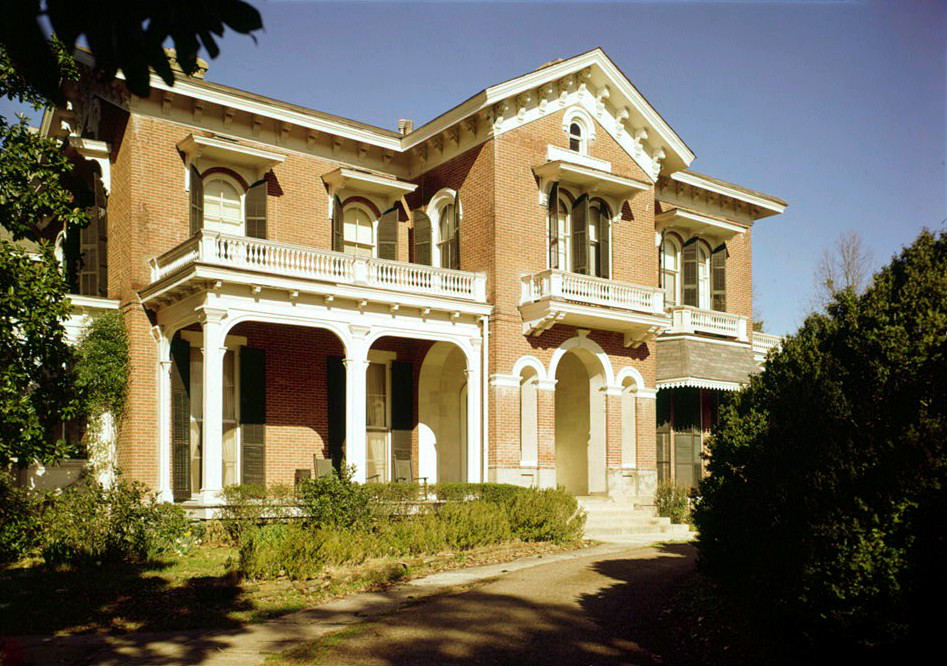
- Ammadelle in 1975

- Location within Mississippi Location within the United States
- Location: 637 North Lamar Boulevard, Oxford, Mississippi
- Coordinates: 34°22′21″N 89°31′6″W
- Area: 7 acres (2.8 ha)
- Built: 1859–1861
- Architect: Calvert Vaux
- Architectural style: Italianate
- NRHP reference No.: 74001064

Significant dates
- Added to NRHP: May 30, 1974
- Designated NHL: May 30, 1974

Ammadelle is a historic house at 637 North Lamar Boulevard in Oxford, Mississippi. Built in 1859, it is an Italianate mansion designed by Calvert Vaux, which he regarded as one of his finest works. It was designated a National Historic Landmark in 1974.

== Description and history ==
Ammadelle is set on a landscaped 7-acre (2.8 ha) parcel on the west side of North Lamar Street south of its junction with Price Street. It is a red brick building, two stories in height, with white Italianate trim and black shutters. It has an irregular plan, with porches flanking a projecting central gabled entry pavilion. The porches, single story in height, have Italianate trim and low balustrades above. Windows on the second level are set in round-arch openings, with deeply projecting bracketed cornices above. The entry is recessed deeply within the pavilion, which has an open arch to the left porch.

The house was designed by Calvert Vaux in 1857, and construction of the building took place between 1859–1861. It resembles another Vaux design apparently never completed for E. S. Hall in Middletown, Connecticut, dating to earlier in his career.

Final details were incomplete when the American Civil War started, and the missing details (balconies across the rear, and a wine cellar) were never finished. Vaux was at the time of the commission just 34, and had recently struck out on his own after having worked with Andrew Jackson Downing, a major proponent of the Italianate style.

The house was built for Thomas E.B. Pegues. It has been very well preserved, with only minor alterations. Vaux's original plans are with the owner of the building. It remains privately owned.

== See also ==
- List of National Historic Landmarks in Mississippi
- National Register of Historic Places listings in Lafayette County, Mississippi
