= Robert Dodge House =

House in Washington, D.C.

- U.S. National Historic Landmark District – Contributing property
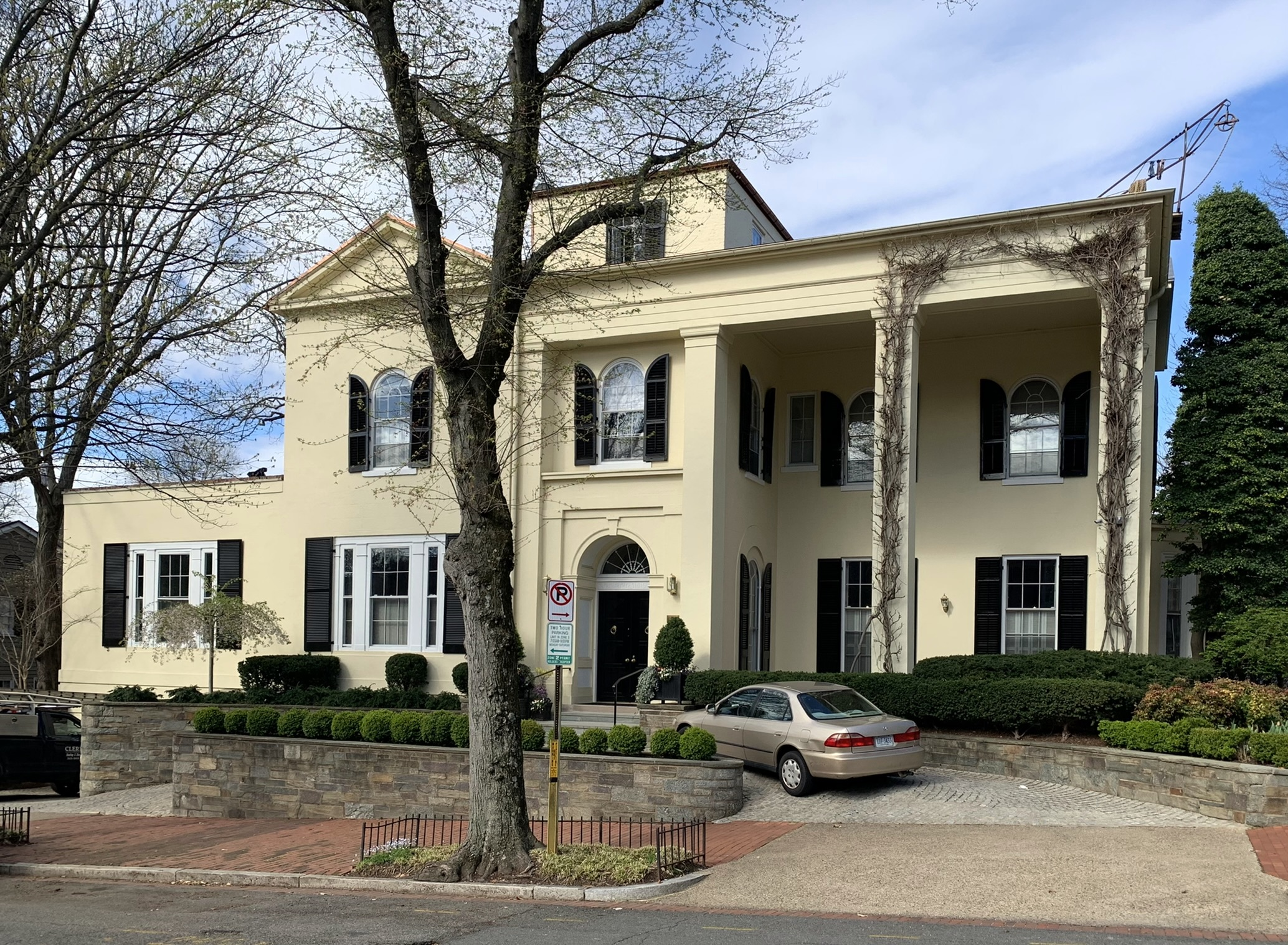
- Location: 534 28th Street Northwest, Washington, D.C.
- Architect: Andrew Jackson Downing and Calvert Vaux
- Part of: Georgetown Historic District

The Robert Dodge House in Georgetown, Washington, D.C. is a historic home designed by Andrew Jackson Downing and Calvert Vaux. It is listed on the National Register of Historic Places as a contributing building in the Georgetown Historic District, which is also a U.S. National Historic Landmark District.

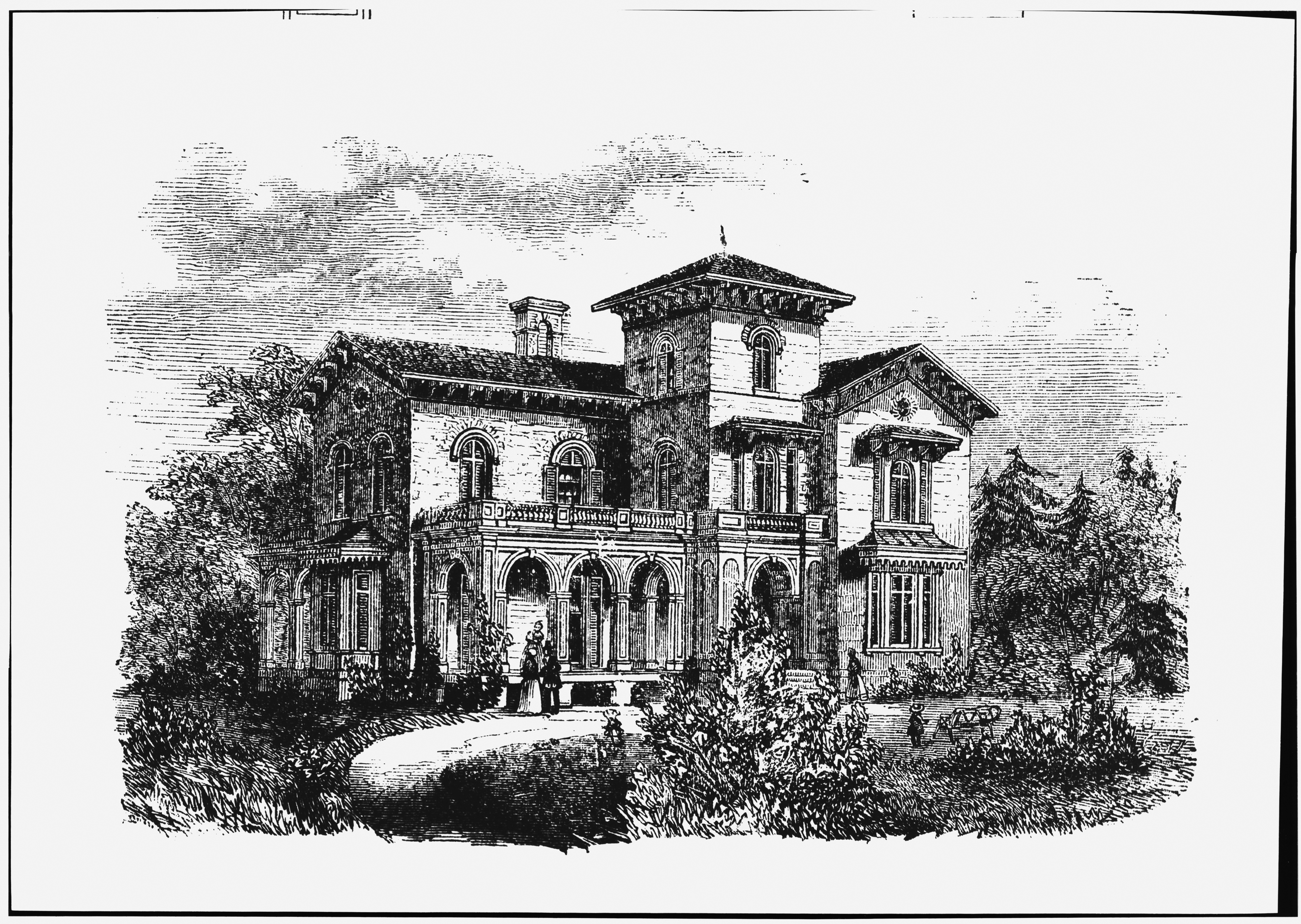
Illustration in Villas and Cottages (1857)

It was described in Calvert Vaux's Villas and Cottages book of 1857 and was documented on the Historic American Buildings Survey. Photographs of its exterior, interior, and building plans were made part of the Historic American Buildings Survey and are on Wikimedia Commons.

The house was designed by Andrew Jackson Downing and Calvert Vaux. Many of its Italianate features were removed. It originally had a porch tower. It was built for Robert P. Dodge, an engineer for the C & O Canal and was involved in business with Georgetown Gas Light Company and the Columbia Flour Mill.
