= Richard Brett =

Translator in the Oxford Company for the KJV Bible

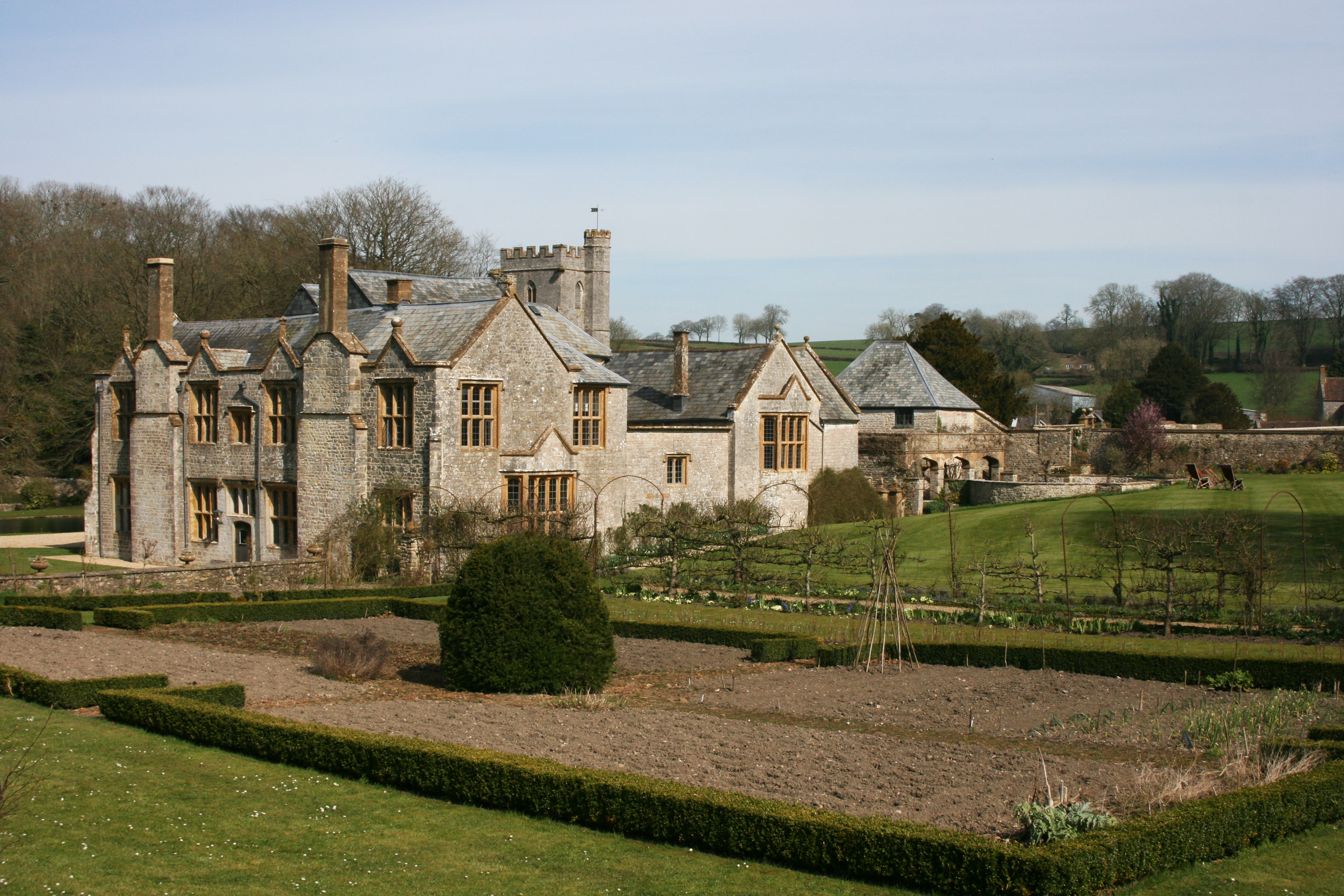
Whitestaunton Manor, the Brett family seat in Somerset.

Richard Brett (1567–1637) was an English clergyman and academic. During the translation of the King James Version of the Bible, Brett served in the "First Oxford Company", responsible for the later books of the Old Testament.

== Life ==
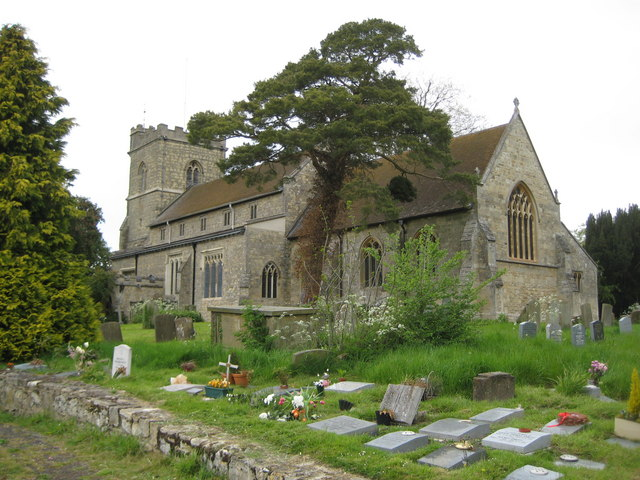
Church of Holy Cross and St Mary, Quainton, Buckinghamshire.

From a family of Catholic recusant sympathisers, Richard was the son of Robert Brett, gent., of Whitestaunton Manor in Somerset. He was born in London. He attended Hart Hall, Oxford which he entered as a commoner in 1582. He was appointed Rector of Quainton, Buckinghamshire, in 1595. That same year, he was granted a Fellowship in Lincoln College under Richard Kilby, where he pursued his study of Latin, Greek, Aramaic, Arabic, Hebrew, and Ge'ez (Ethiopic) tongues. In 1597 he was admitted bachelor of divinity, and he proceeded in divinity in 1605.

He died in Quainton on 5 April 1637, aged 70, and is buried in the chancel of Quainton Church, which he served for 43 years. Over his grave a monument with his effigies and a Latin and English epitaph was erected by his widow. His will was proved in P.C.C. in June 1637. By his wife Alice, daughter of Richard Brown, sometime mayor of Oxford, he left four daughters, of whom Margaret married Calybute Downing in 1627.

== Works ==
His scholarly publications were in Latin.

- Two translations from Greek into Latin:
  - Vitæ sanctorum Evangelistarum Johannis et Lucæ à Simeone Metaphraste concinnatæ, Oxford, 1597.
  - Agatharchidis et Memnonis historicorum quæ supersunt omnia, Oxford, 1597.
- Iconum sacrarum Decas in quâ è subjectis typis compluscula sanæ doctrinæ capita eruuntur (Joseph Barnes, Oxford 1603).
