= Calvert Vaux =

Architect and landscape designer (1824–95)

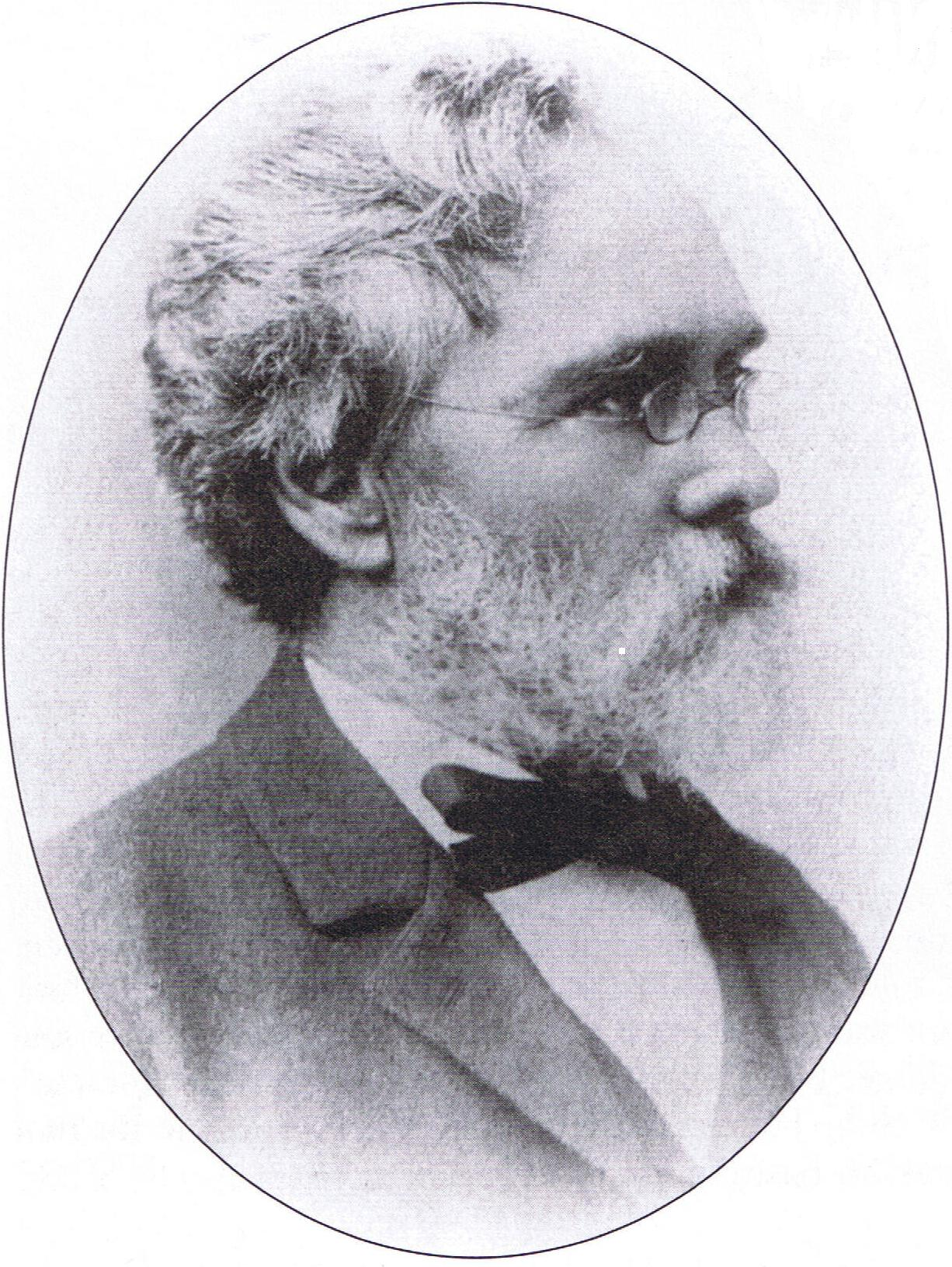
- Born: December 20, 1824; London, England
- Died: November 19, 1895 (aged 70); Brooklyn, New York, U.S.
- Occupation: Architect
- Spouse: Mary Swan McEntee
- Children: Calvert; Downing; Helen; Julia
- Practice: 1850–1895
- Buildings: Dr. William A. M. Culbert House; Daniel Parish House; Halsey Stevens House; W. E. Warren House; Sheppard Asylum; Ammadelle; Frederico Berreda House; Belvedere Castle; Olana; Metropolitan Museum of Art
- Projects: Central Park; Prospect Park; Buffalo Parks System; Hudson River State Hospital; Samuel J. Tilden House; Downing Park; Rockwood Park, Saint John

Calvert Vaux FAIA (/vɔːks/; December 20, 1824 – November 19, 1895) was an English-American architect and landscape designer. He and his professional partner Frederick Law Olmsted designed parks such as Central Park and Prospect Park in New York City and the Delaware Park–Front Park System in Buffalo, New York.

Vaux, on his own and in various partnerships, designed and created dozens of parks across the northeastern United States, most famously in Manhattan, Brooklyn, and Buffalo in New York. He introduced new ideas about the significance of public parks in America during a hectic time of urbanization. This industrialization of the cityscape inspired Vaux to focus on the integration of buildings, bridges, and other forms of architecture into their natural surroundings. He favored naturalistic and curvilinear lines in his designs.

In addition to landscape architecture, Vaux was a highly-sought after architect until the 1870s, when his modes of design could not endure the country's return to classical forms. His partnership with Andrew Jackson Downing, a major figure in horticulture, landscape design, and domestic architecture, brought him from London to Newburgh, New York, in 1850. There, Downing's praise of Gothic Revival and Italianate architecture contributed to Vaux's personal growth as a designer of homes and landscapes. After Downing's sudden death in 1852, Vaux was left with their assistant Frederick Clarke Withers to continue Downing's legacy. He left Newburgh in 1856 to grow his practice in New York City, where he began, received and completed commissions with Olmsted, Withers, and Jacob Wrey Mould. As a result, Vaux's name was frequently overshadowed by other designers, such as Olmsted, yet the contemporary American public still recognized his talents.

== Early life ==
Born in London to a physician, Vaux was baptized at St Benet Gracechurch on February 9, 1825. He trained as an apprentice under the architect Lewis Nockalls Cottingham, a leader of the Gothic Revival movement interested in Tudor architecture. Vaux trained under Cottingham until the age of twenty-six, also befriending George Godwin and George Truefitt during his studies.

== First partnership ==
In 1850, Vaux exhibited a series of watercolor landscapes that he made while en route to the United States that caught the attention of Andrew Jackson Downing, a noted landscape architect in Newburgh, New York. Rejected in his offer to Alexander Jackson Davis to form a partnership, Downing traveled to London in search of a new architect who would complement his architectural vision. He believed that architecture should be visually integrated into the surrounding landscape, and wanted to work with someone who was equally passionate. Vaux accepted the opportunity and subsequently moved to the United States.

Vaux worked with Downing for two years and became a firm partner. Together, they designed many projects such as the White House grounds and the Smithsonian Institution in Washington, D.C. Vaux's work on the Smithsonian inspired him to write an article in 1852 for The Horticulturalist, of which Downing was the editor. In his publication, he argued that the government should recognize and support the arts. Shortly afterward, Downing died in the Henry Clay steamboat disaster.

== Vaux & Withers ==
After Downing's death, Vaux gained control of the firm. As a partner, he hired Frederick Clarke Withers, who was already working at the company. In two separate periods of partnership, interrupted by the Civil War, their projects included multiple houses in Newburgh, the Hudson River State Hospital, and the Jefferson Market Courthouse.

== U.S. citizenship, affiliations, and publishing ==
In 1856, he gained U.S. citizenship and became identified with New York City's artistic community, “the guild,” joining the National Academy of Design, as well as the Century Club.

In 1857, he became one of the founding members of the American Institute of Architects.

Also in 1857, Vaux published Villas and Cottages, which was an influential pattern book that determined the standards for “Victorian Gothic” architecture.

These particular writings revealed his acknowledgment and tribute to Ruskin and Ralph Waldo Emerson, as well as to his former partner Downing. These people, among others, influenced him intellectually and in his design path.

== Collaboration with Olmsted ==
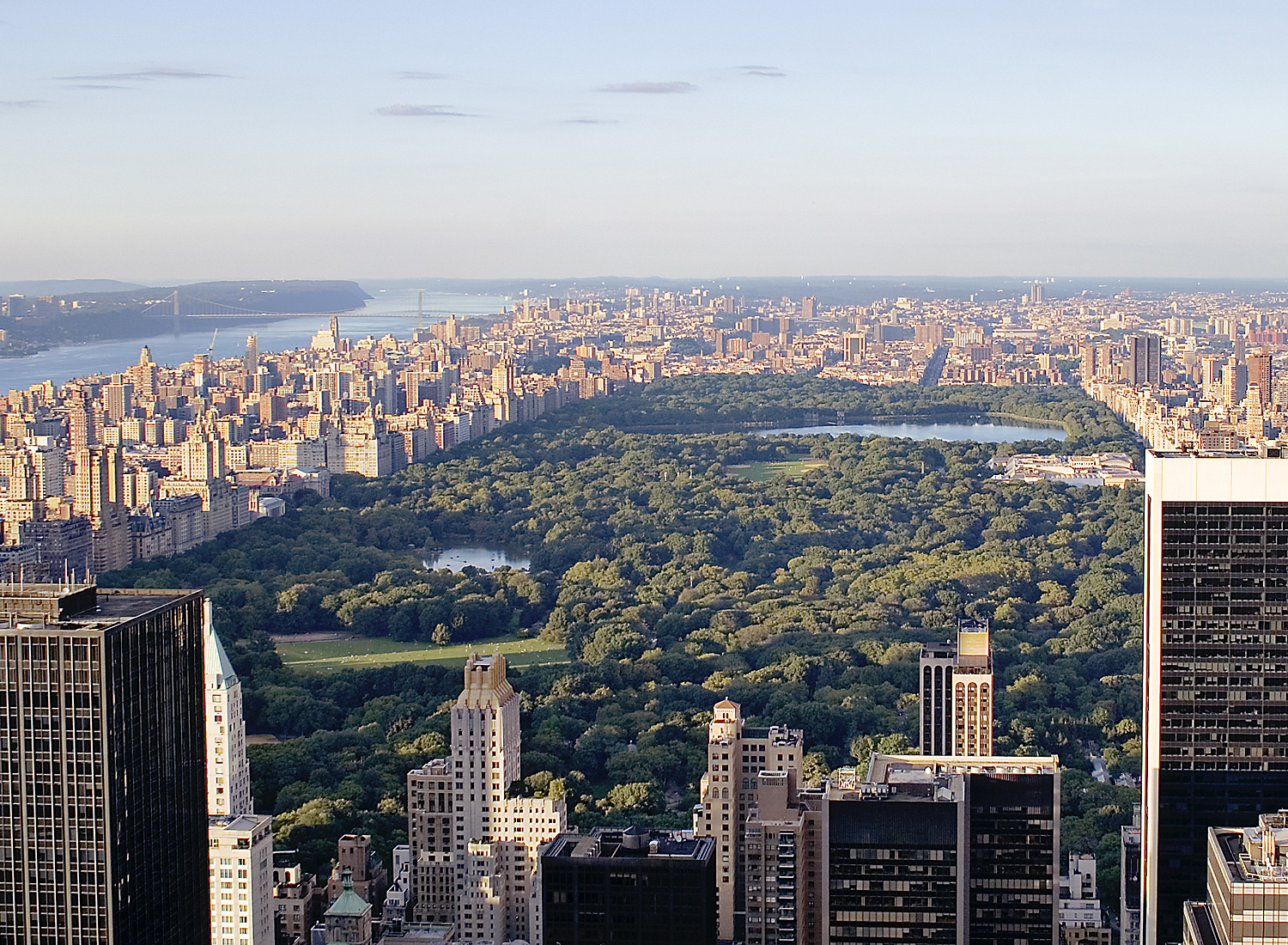
New York City's Central Park

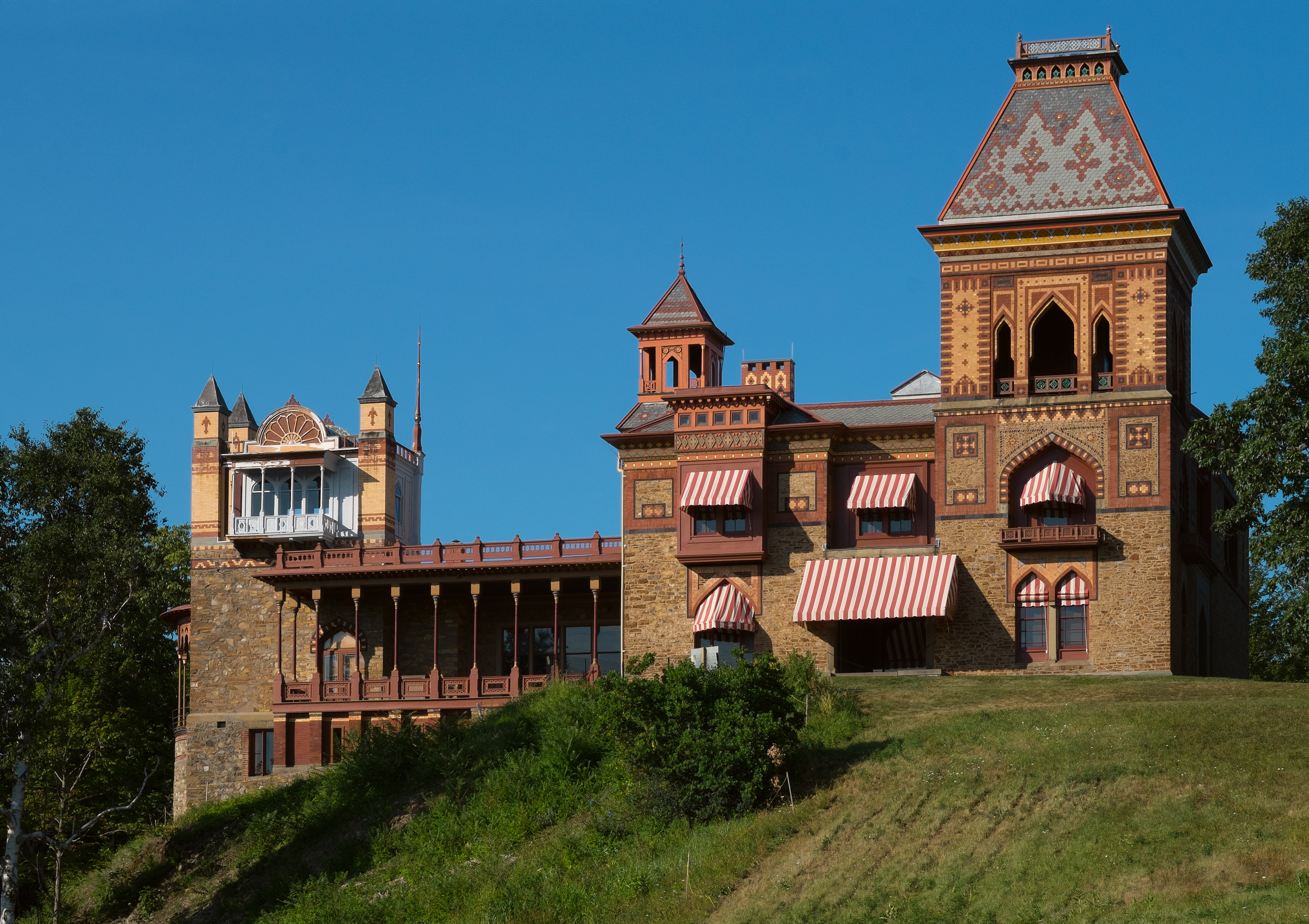
Olana, a collaboration with Frederic Church (1870–72)

In 1857, Vaux recruited Frederick Law Olmsted, who had never before designed a landscape plan, to help with the Greensward Plan, which would become New York City's Central Park. They obtained the commission through the Greensward Plan, an excellent presentation that drew upon Vaux's talents in landscape drawing to include before-and-after sketches of the site. Together, they fought many political battles to make sure their original design remained intact and was carried out. All of the built features of Central Park were of his design; Bethesda Terrace is a good example.

In 1865, Vaux and Olmsted founded Olmsted, Vaux and Co., which went on to design Prospect Park and Fort Greene Park in Brooklyn, and Morningside Park in Manhattan. In Chicago, they planned one of the first suburbs for the Riverside Improvement Company in 1868. They also were commissioned to design a major park project in Buffalo, New York, which included The Parade (now Martin Luther King, Jr. Park), The Park (now the Delaware Park), and The Front (now simply Front Park).

Vaux designed many structures to beautify the parks, but most of these have been demolished. Vaux also designed a large Canadian city park in the city of Saint John, New Brunswick called Rockwood Park. It is one of the largest of its kind in Canada.

In 1871, the partners designed the grounds of the New York State Hospital for the Insane in Buffalo and the Hudson River State Hospital for the Insane in Poughkeepsie.

In 1872, Vaux dissolved the partnership and went on to form an architectural partnership with George K. Radford and Samuel Parsons. In that same year he completed work on Olana, the home of artist Frederic Edwin Church, who collaborated with Vaux on the mansion's design.

Famous New York City buildings Vaux designed are the Samuel J. Tilden House, and the original Ruskinian Gothic buildings, now largely invisible from exterior view, of the American Museum of Natural History and the Metropolitan Museum of Art. In addition to the New York buildings, Vaux also was the architect for The Sheppard and Enoch Pratt Hospital in Towson, Maryland.

Less familiar are twelve projects Vaux designed for the Children's Aid Society in partnership with Radford; the Fourteenth Ward Industrial School (1889), pp. 256–258 Mott Street, facing the churchyard of St. Patrick's Old Cathedral, and the Elizabeth Home for Girls (1892), 307 East 12th Street, both survive and are landmarked.

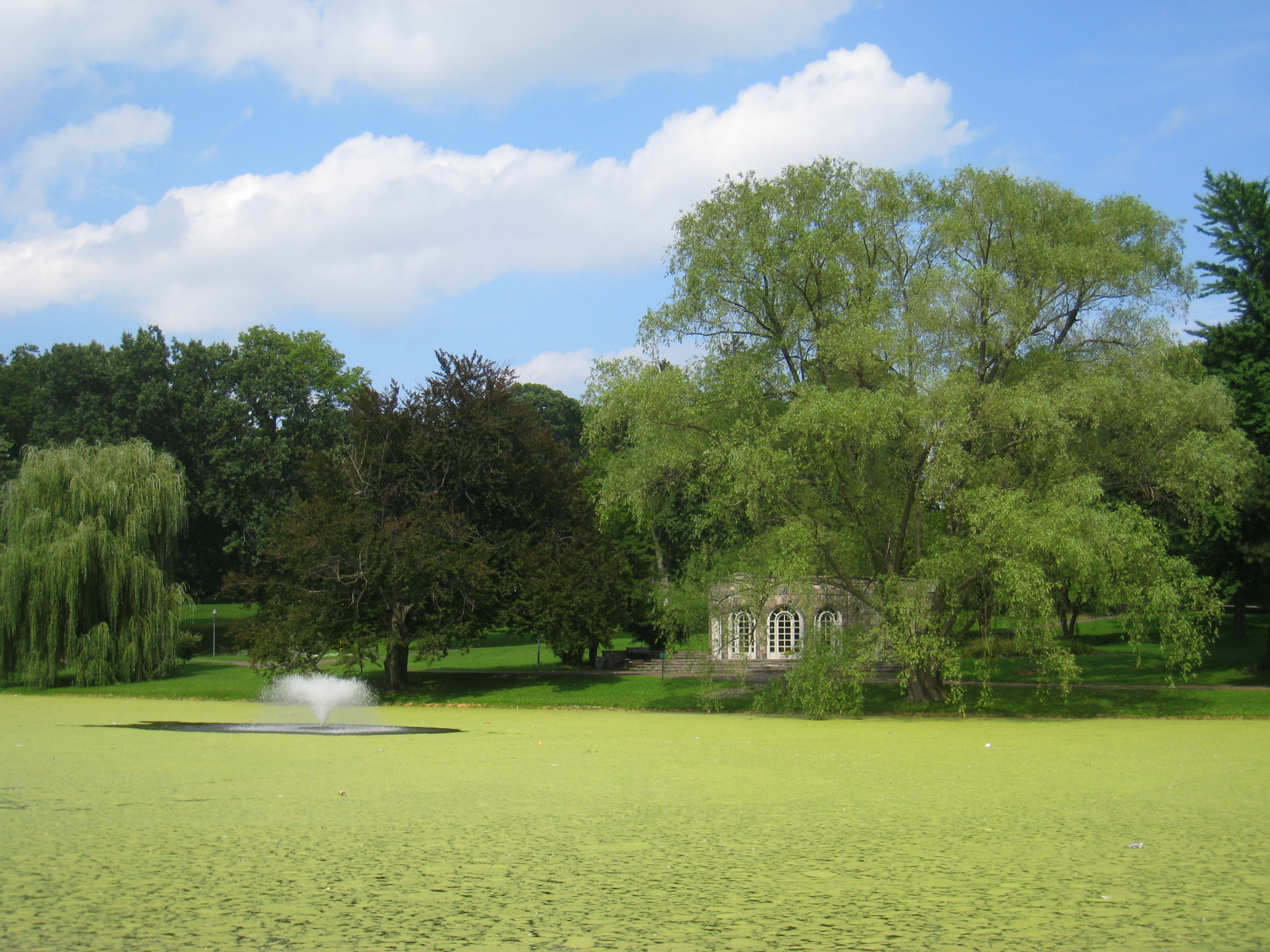
Downing Park, Newburgh, NY (1889)

The last collaboration between Vaux and Olmsted was Downing Park in Newburgh, given to the memory of Downing. Divided into two sections, a hillside landscape and a meadow, the partners handled each differently, connecting them via paths. After Vaux's death, his son Downing completed the grounds, adding a conservatory of his own design. John C. Olmstead completed his father's portion as he had become gravely ill and could not return to Newburgh.

== Death ==
On November 19, 1895, Vaux accidentally drowned in Gravesend Bay in Brooklyn while visiting his son Downing. He is buried in Kingston, New York's Montrepose Cemetery. In 1998, the city of New York dedicated Calvert Vaux Park, situated in Gravesend overlooking the bay, to him.

== Personal life ==
In 1854, Vaux married Mary Swan McEntee, the sister of Jervis McEntee, a Hudson River School painter. They had two sons (Calvert and Downing) and two daughters (Helen and Julia).

== Selected architectural works ==
=== Downing & Vaux (1850–1852) ===
- Joel T. Headley House, "Cedar Lawn," New Windsor, NY (1850–51)
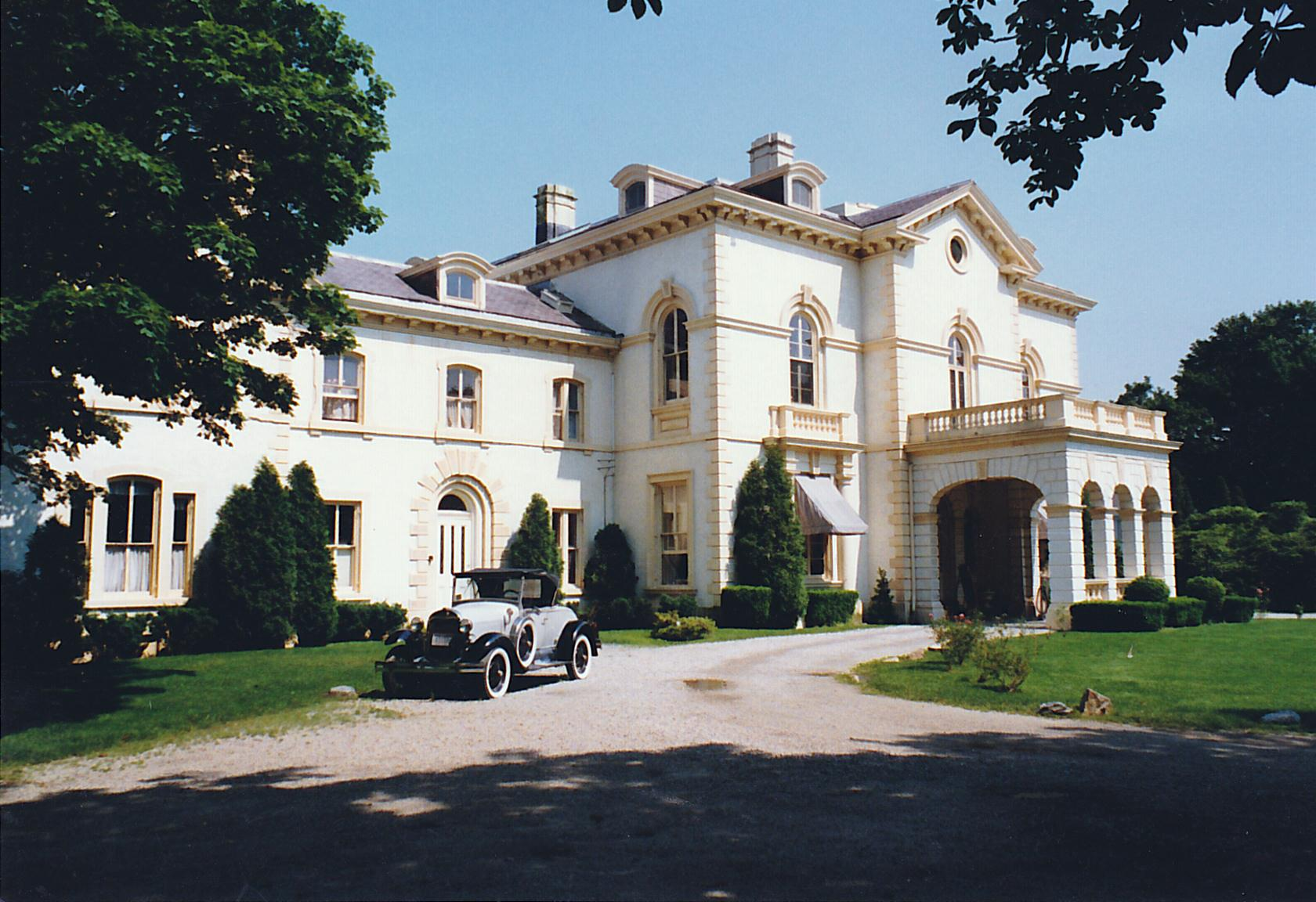
  Daniel Parish House, Newport, RI (1852)
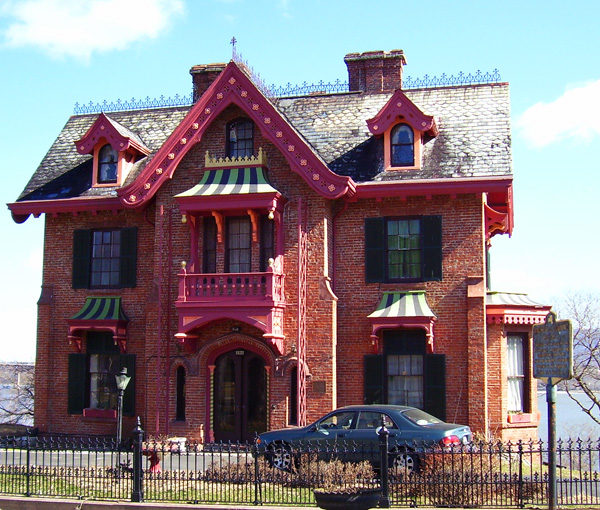
  W. E. Warren House, Newburgh, NY (1853)
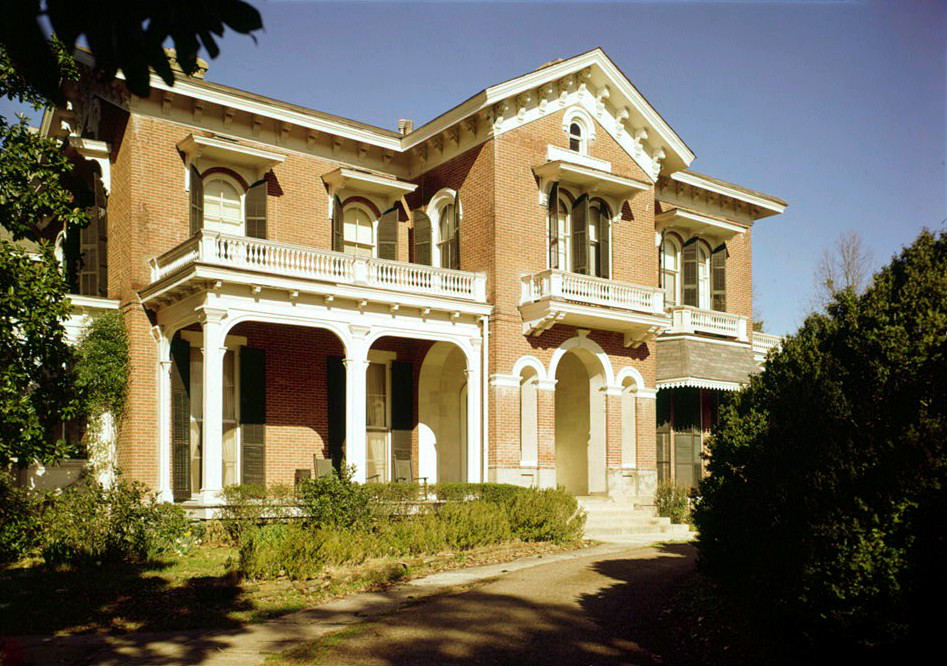
  Ammadelle, Oxford, MS (1859–61)
- Remodel of Warren Delano House, "Algonac," Balmville, NY (1851)
- Dr. William A. M. Culbert House, Newburgh, NY (1851–52)
- William L. Findlay House, Newburgh, NY (1851–52)
- Daniel Parish House, Newport, RI (1852–53; 1855)
- Robert Dodge House, Washington, D.C. (1850–53)

==== Sole partner ====
- William E. Warren House, Newburgh, NY (1853)
- Nathaniel Parker Willis House, "Idlewild," Cornwall on Hudson, NY (1853)
- Remodel of Henry Winthrop Sargent House, "Wodenethe," Beacon, NY (1853)
- Edward S. Hall House (project), Middletown, CT (1853)
- Lydig M. Hoyt House, "The Point," Staatsburg, NY (1855), independently

=== Vaux & Withers (1854–1856) ===
- James Walker Fowler House (project), Newburgh, NY (c. 1855)
- Halsey R. Stevens House, Newburgh, NY (1855)
- Bank of New York, New York, NY (1856)
- Leonard H. Lee Cottage, New Windsor, NY (1856)
- Thomas Earle House, Worcester, MA (1856)
- John A. C. Gray House, New York, NY (1856–57)

=== Central Park structures (1857–1870) ===
- Bow Bridge (completed 1858), with Jacob Wrey Mould
- Ramble Arch (completed 1859)
- Bethesda Terrace (built 1862–73), with Mould
- Boys Play House, (completed 1868)
- The Dairy (completed 1869)
- Belvedere Castle (built 1867–71), with Mould

=== Country houses (1856–1863) ===
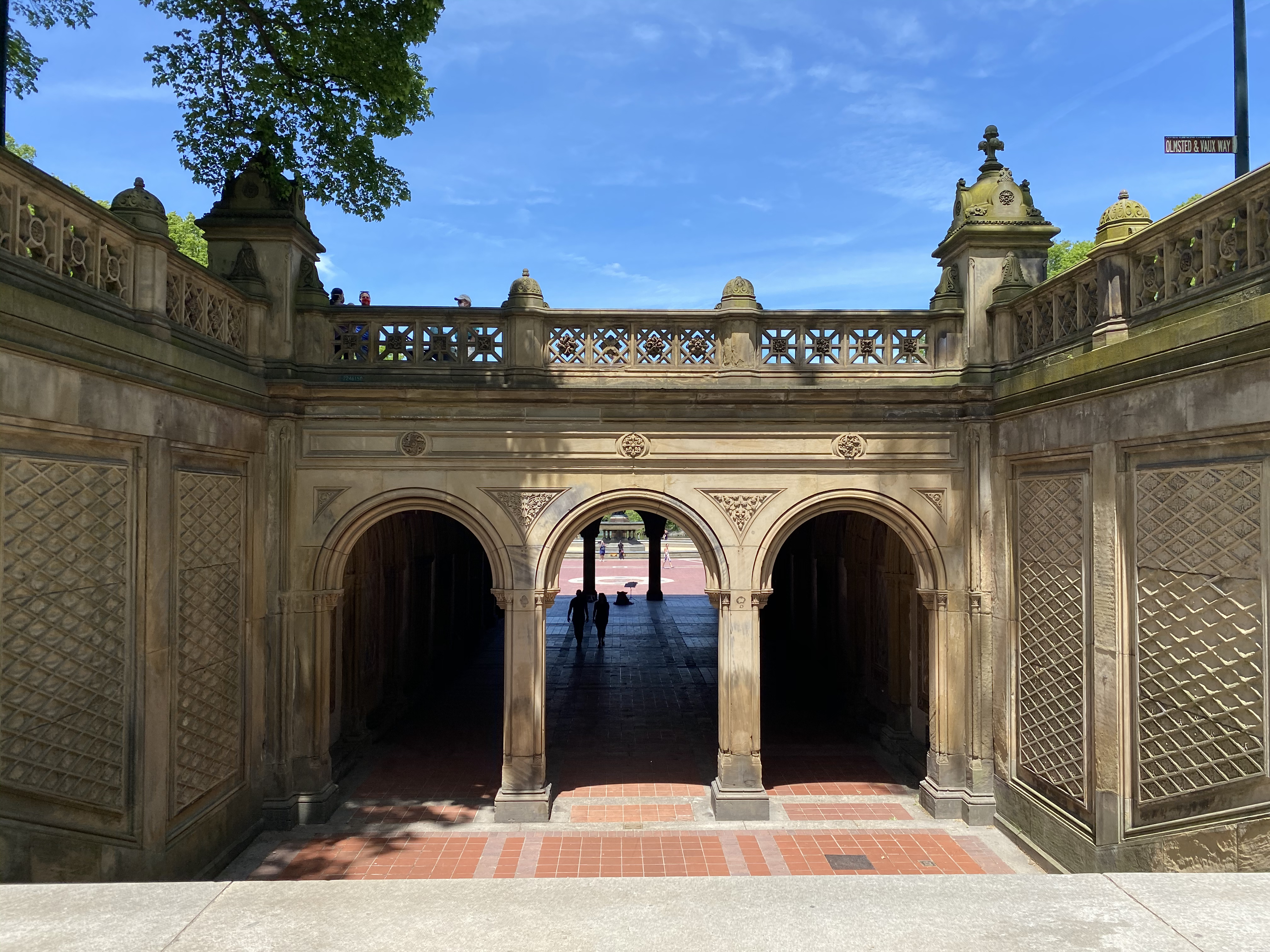
- Bethesda Terrace, Central Park, New York, NY (1862–73)
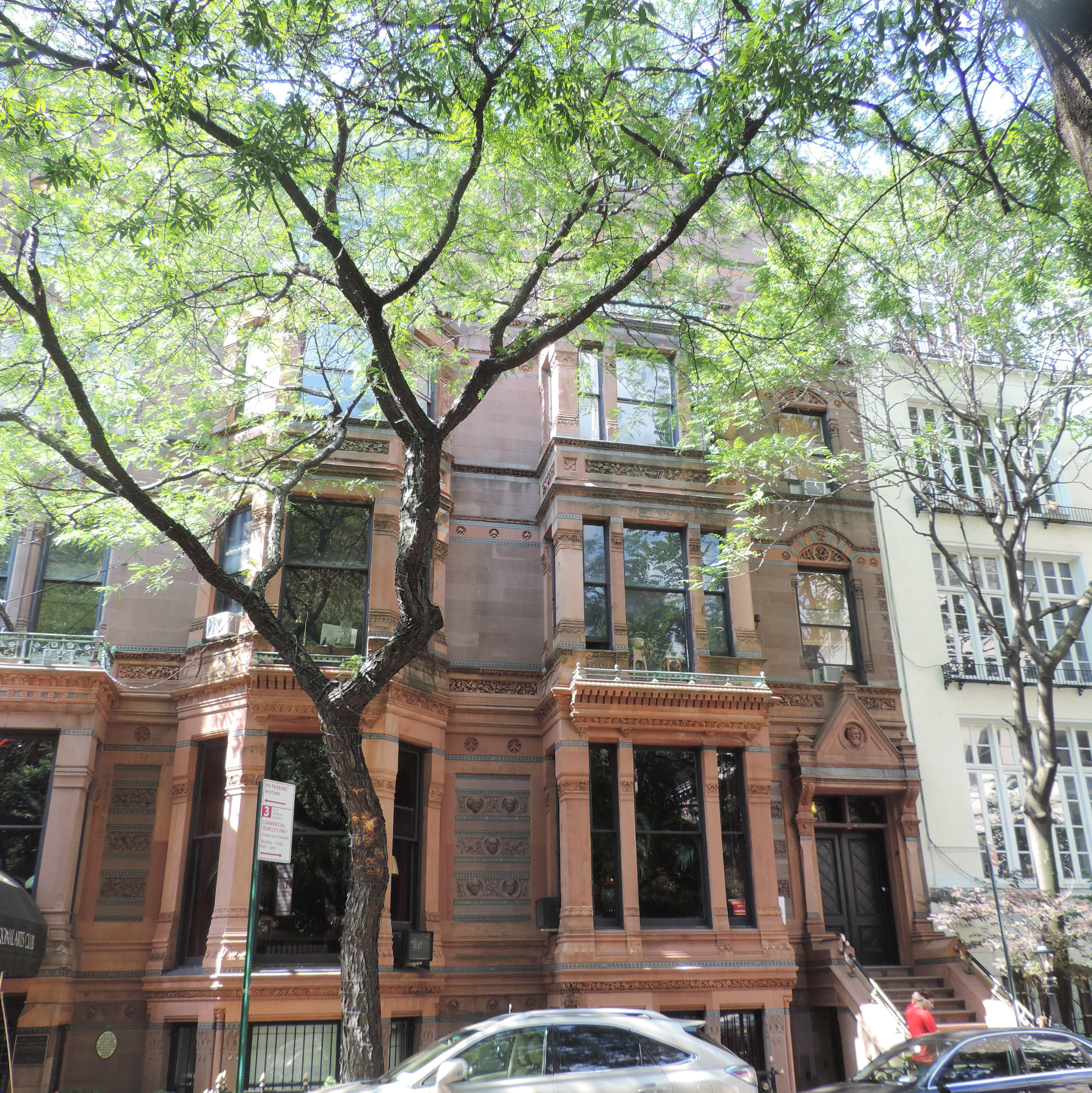
  Remodel of Samuel J. Tilden House (1881–84)
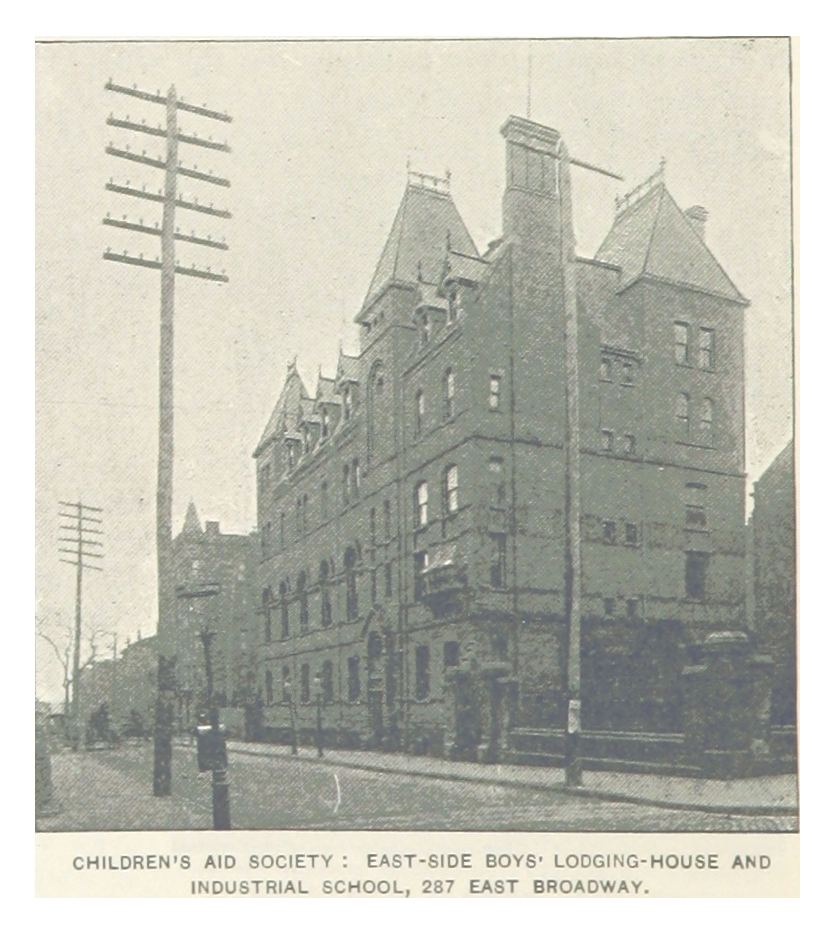
  East Side Boys' Lodging House and Industrial School, New York, NY (1879)
  Eugene Dutilh House, Garrison, NY (1857)
- Remodel of John Bigelow House, "The Squirrels," Highland Falls, NY (1857)
- Peter Chardon Brooks III House, "Point of Rocks," Medford, MA (1859)
- Thomas E. B. Pegues House, "Ammadelle," Oxford, MS (1859–61)
- Frederico Berreda House, Newport, RI (1859–60)
- Francis Tomes House, Greenwich, CT (1861)
- Stephen B. Hammond House, "Ashcroft," Geneva, NY (1862)

=== Vaux, Withers & Co. (1863–1871) ===
- Landscape architecture with Olmsted, Gallaudet University, Washington, DC (1866)
- Landscape architecture with Olmsted, Hudson River State Hospital, Poughkeepsie, NY (1867)
- Civic planning and landscape design with Olmsted, Riverside, Illinois (1869)
- Dore Cottage, Riverside, Illinois (1869)
- Consulting, Frederic E. Church House, "Olana," Hudson, NY (1870–72)
- American Museum of Natural History, New York, NY (1872–77), with Mould
- George J. Bull House, Worcester, MA (1874–75)
- Design for New York City Prison, "Tombs," (1874)

=== Later career (1869–1889) ===
- Fifth Avenue building of the Metropolitan Museum of Art, New York, NY (1874–1880), with Mould
- East Side Boys' Lodging House and Industrial School for Children's Aid Society, New York, NY (1879)
- Raphael Pumpelly House, Newport, RI (1880)
- Garden, Grace Church, New York, NY (1881)
- Remodel of Samuel J. Tilden House, New York, NY (1881–84)
- Edwin Booth House, "Boothden," Middletown, RI (1883)
- Tompkins Square Lodging House and Industrial School, New York, NY (1885)
- Canal Street Park, New York, NY (1887–88)
- Mulberry Bend Park, New York, NY (1895)
- Rockwood Park (Saint John, New Brunswick) (1894)
- Downing Park, Newburgh, NY (1889), with Olmsted

== Sources ==
- Kowsky, Francis R. Country, Park, & City: The Architecture and Life of Calvert Vaux. New York: Oxford University Press, 1998.
