= Fourteenth Ward Industrial School =

- U.S. National Register of Historic Places
- U.S. Historic district – Contributing property
- New York State Register of Historic Places
- New York City Landmark
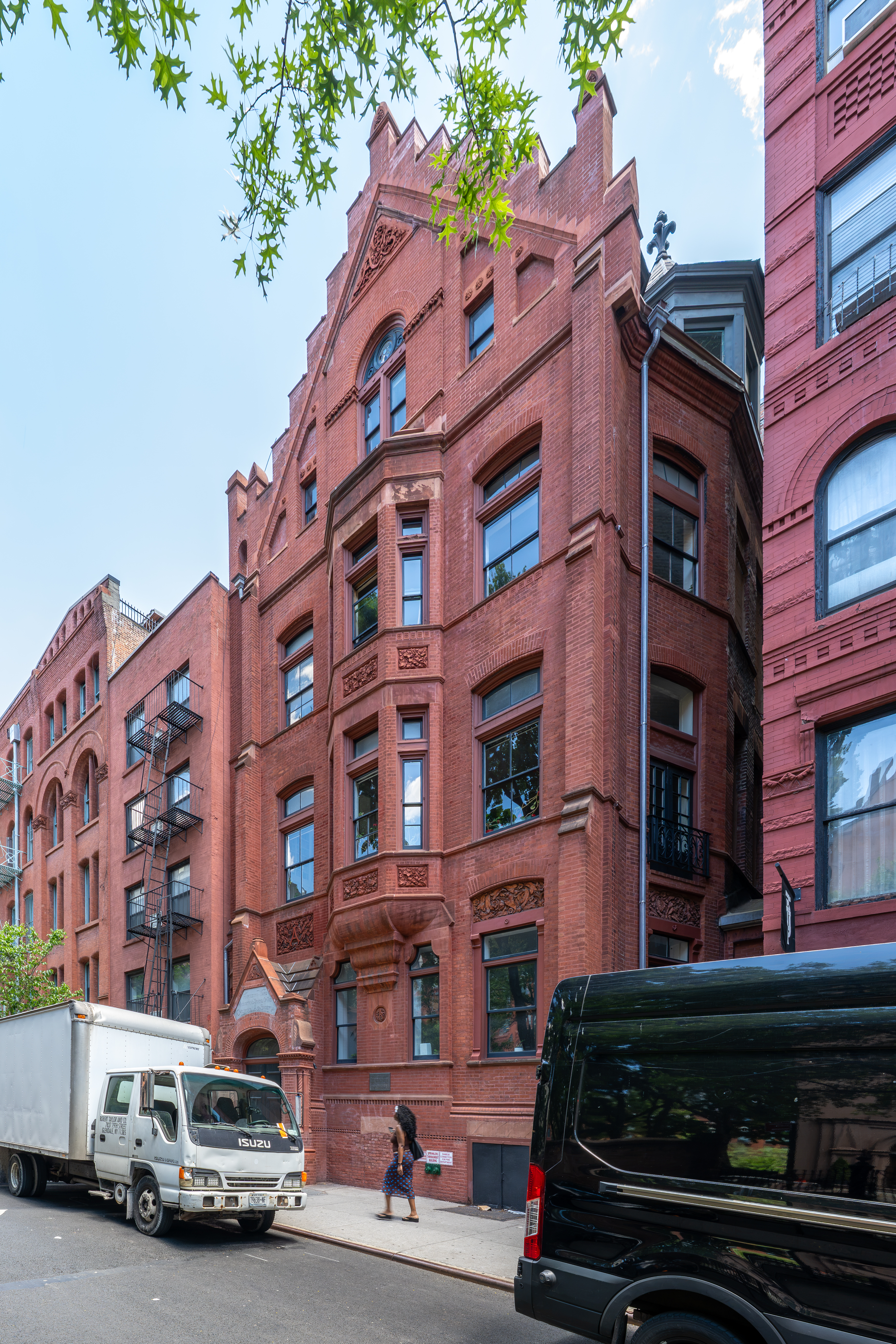
- Location: 256-258 Mott Street, Manhattan, New York City
- Coordinates: 40°43′24.5″N 73°59′40″W
- Built: 1888-89
- Architect: Vaux & Radford
- Architectural style: Victorian Gothic
- Part of: Chinatown and Little Italy Historic District (ID10000012)
- NRHP reference No.: 83001724
- NYSRHP No.: 06101.001697
- NYCL No.: 0960

Significant dates
- Added to NRHP: January 27, 1983
- Designated CP: February 12, 2010
- Designated NYSRHP: December 16, 1982
- Designated NYCL: July 12, 1977

The Fourteenth Ward Industrial School is located at 256-258 Mott Street between Prince and Houston Streets in the Nolita neighborhood of Manhattan, New York City. It was built for the Children's Aid Society in 1888–89, with funds provided by John Jacob Astor III, and was designed by the firm of Vaux & Radford in the Victorian Gothic style. The Society built a number of schools for indigent children at the time. It was later known as the Astor Memorial School.

The building, which is now in residential use, was designated a New York City landmark in 1977, and was added to the National Register of Historic Places in 1983.

== See also ==
- National Register of Historic Places listings in Manhattan below 14th Street
