= Ashcroft (Geneva, New York) =

Historic house in New York, United States

- U.S. National Register of Historic Places
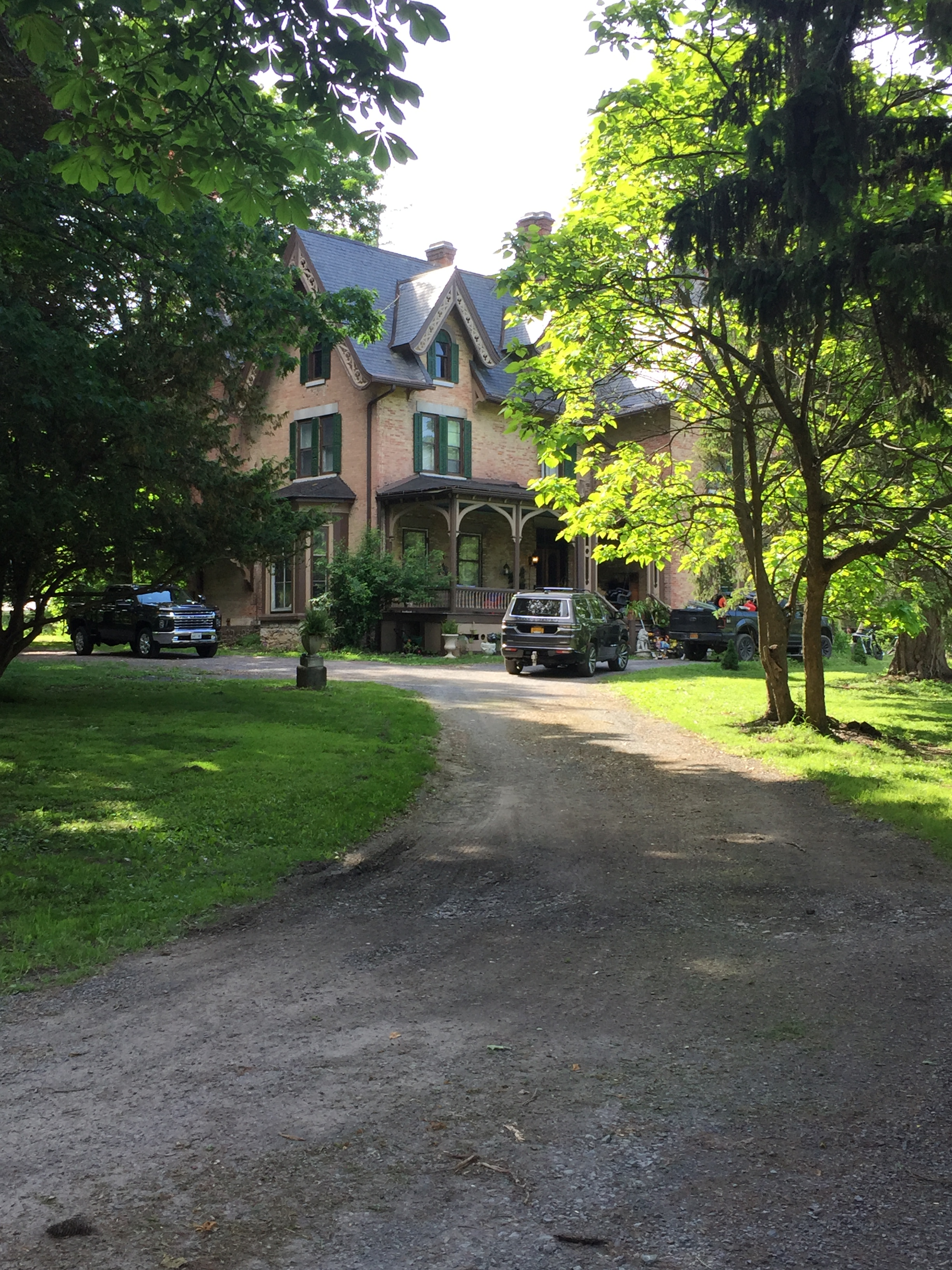
- Ashcroft in 2022

- Location within New York Location within the United States
- Location: 112 Jay St., Geneva, New York
- Coordinates: 42°51′13″N 76°59′9″W
- Area: 5 acres (2.0 ha)
- Built: 1862
- Architect: Calvert Vaux
- Architectural style: Gothic Revival
- NRHP reference No.: 75001218
- Added to NRHP: November 20, 1975

Ashcroft is a historic home located at Geneva in Ontario County, New York. It is a 2 1/2-story brick home with a high pitched slate roof with projecting eaves. It is a large Gothic Revival style country house set deep in the midst of once carefully landscaped grounds. The house and property were designed by Calvert Vaux in 1862.

It was listed on the National Register of Historic Places in 1975.
