= Rockwood Park (Saint John, New Brunswick) =

Park in Saint John, New Brunswick, Canada

- Parc Rockwood (Canadian French)
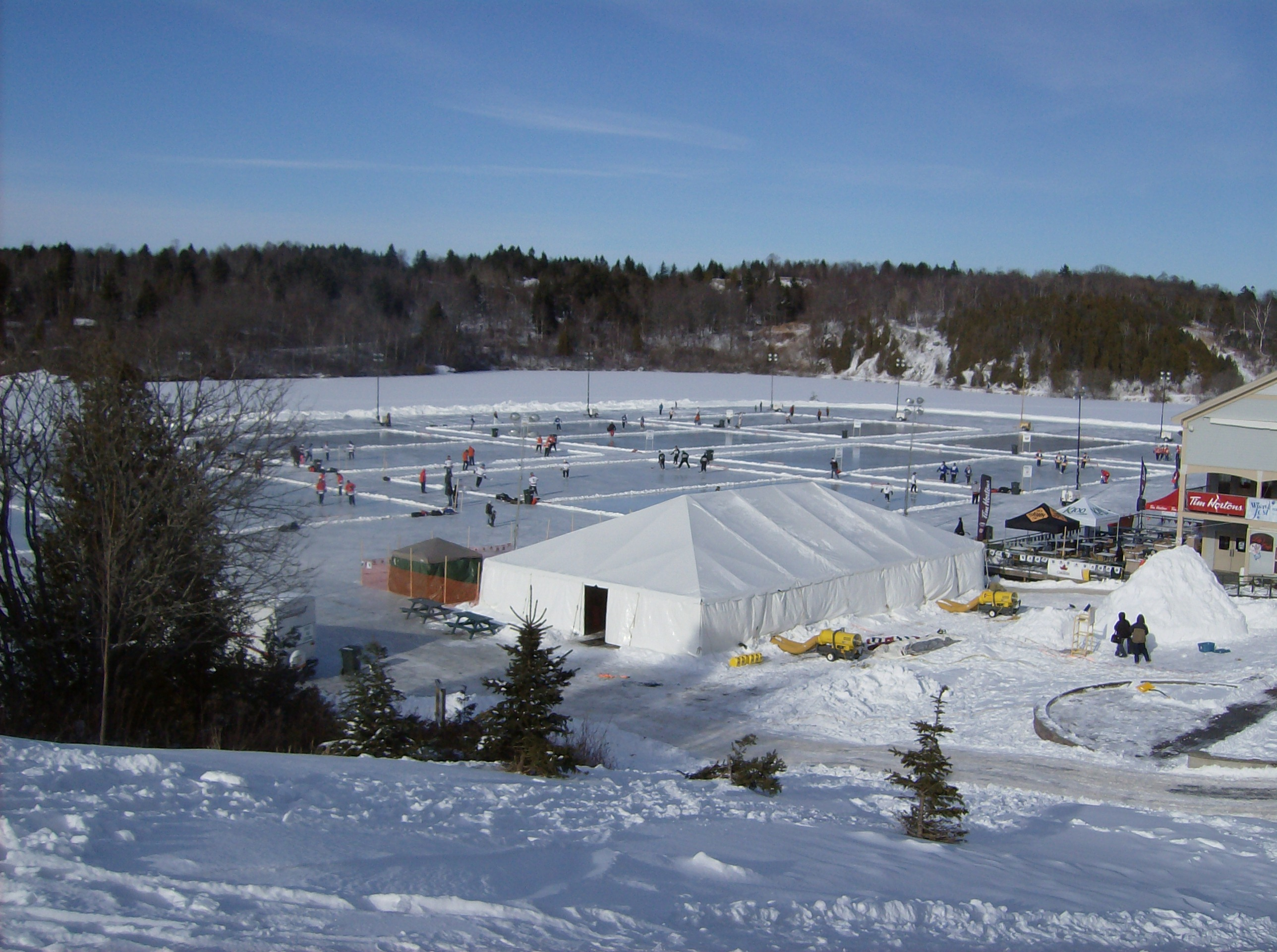
- Ice rinks in Rockwood Park
- Interactive map of Rockwood Park
- Location: Saint John, New Brunswick
- Coordinates: 45.3045°N 66.0594°W
- Area: 2,200 acres (890 ha)
- Established: 1884
- Founder: Saint John Horticultural Association
- Designer: Calvert Vaux
- Owner: City of Saint John
- Administrator: Rockwood Park Advisory Board
- Manager: Michael Hugenholtz, Commissioner of Public Works And Transportation
- Operator: City of Saint John / Saint John Horticultural Association (Campground) / Gary R. Spicer (Golf Course)
- Open: Dawn to Dusk
- Status: Open all year
- Awards: 1971- Vincent Massey Award for Urban Excellence / 1982- AWWA Water Landmark Award
- Camp sites: 189
- Hiking trails: 53
- Designation: Stonehammer UNESCO Global Geopark site
- Budget: $527,829
- Parking: 7 Parking Lots
- Public transit: Saint John Transit, Route 20 - Hawthorne Av. & Arrow Walk Rd. Stop
- Ownership transferred to City: 1967
- Website: www.rockwoodparksj.ca

Rockwood Park is an urban park in Saint John, New Brunswick established in 1894. It is 2,200 acres (890 ha) in size, with ten lakes and 55 trails and footpaths. The park includes upland Acadian mixed forest, several hills and several caves, as well as freshwater lakes, with a trail network, and a golf course.

It is located in the eastern area of the North End and is one of Canada's largest urban parks. It is also park of the UNESCO Stonehammer Geopark.

The park is open from dawn until dusk and has free parking. Visitors can enter and exit from either the Lake Drive at Lily Lake or Hawthorne Avenue Extension at Fisher Lakes. Paved pathways connect to amenities such as the Interpretation Centre, the Kiwanis Play Park, and the Bark Park.

== Description ==
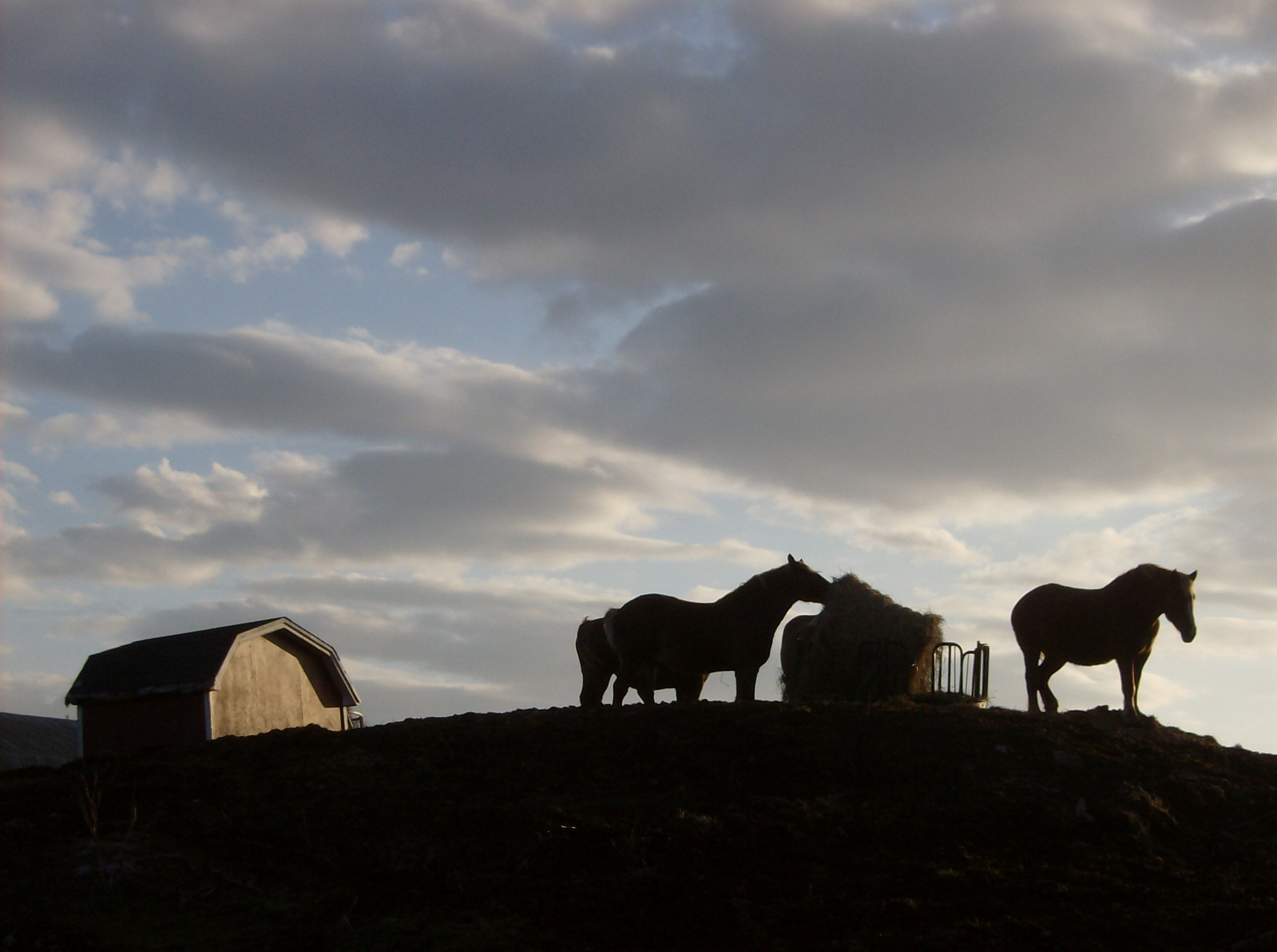
Stables at Rockwood Park

Rockwood Park is located in Saint John, New Brunswick, just north from the Uptown region. The park has 55 trails both footpaths and mountain bike routes. The park is 2,200 acres (890 ha) in size and contains six natural lakes. One of these lakes, Lily Lake, is a frequent boating and fishing spot used by visitors.

Rockwood Park is aptly named for its diverse geological formations. The park features a variety of rocks, including Precambrian marble, gneiss, and igneous rocks from the Precambrian to Cambrian period (such as granite, tonalite, granodiorite, and dacite), in addition to Devonian sandstone and conglomerate. Two distinct geological terranes are present within the park. The Caledonia Fault, a prominent geological feature, separates these two terranes. The main road past the Lily Lake Pavilion follows the fault line. The park offers various trails for geological exploration, accessible on foot, by mountain bike, or on horseback. For those seeking a more interactive experience, rock climbing with a guide is available. In winter, the park is ideal for cross-country skiing and snowshoeing.

== History ==
Rockwood Park was designed in the 19th century by Calvert Vaux, one of the designers of Central Park in New York City. Vaux's father had previously made a preliminary report for the park, which Vaux would work on after inheriting some of his father's clients after his death. Initially, Rockwood Park was created around Lily Lake during the late 19th century, being named through a vote conducted for nearby citizens.

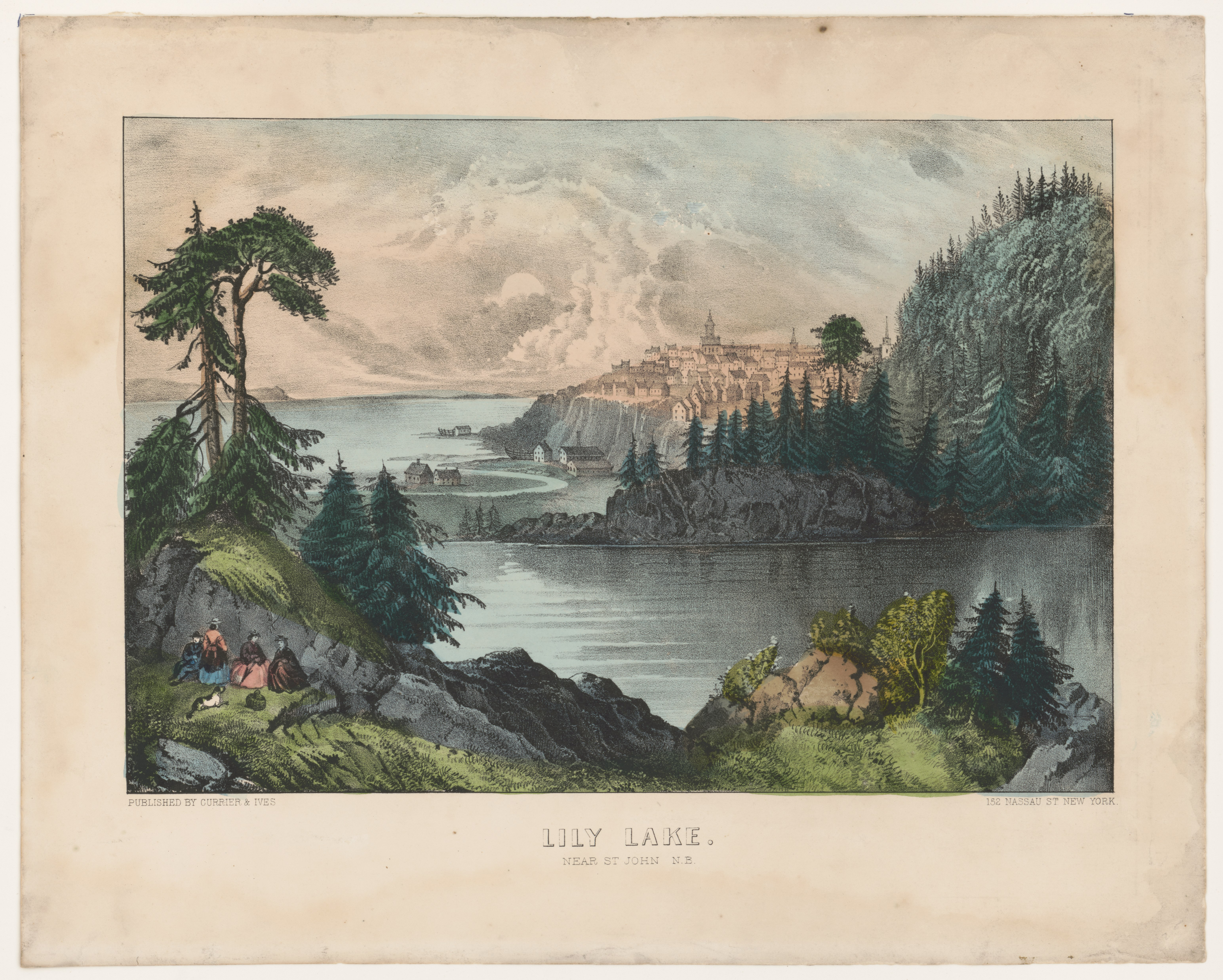
Early painting of Lily Lake with Saint John in the distance.

As a UNESCO geosite, Rockwood has been a site of significant geological study. In the late 1800s, the Natural History Society of New Brunswick conducted an investigation of the park's geology, and specimens collected during this period are now housed in the New Brunswick Museum. Howes Cave, discovered in the 1860s and later described in the Society Bulletin in 1904, formed through the dissolution of carbonate bedrock (marble) by natural acids in rainwater and groundwater. Additionally, a graphite mine operated near the outlet of Lily Lake during the 1800s.

Lily Lake was one of the first sources of fresh water for Saint John. It was hauled from the lake by tanks and sold for 1 cent a bucket. In 1907, a court battle ensued as to who had the rights to the ice in Lily Lake; the ice cutters or the skaters. Although the ice cutters had been granted permission to erect an ice block conveyor in previous years, the skaters won and for decades the lake was center for outdoor winter recreation.

In 1926, the speed skater Charles Gorman, won the World Speed Skating Championship on Lily Lake. It was estimated that 25,000 people turned out on February 7, 1926, to watch him take the championship, setting a world record in the 220 and 440 yard events.

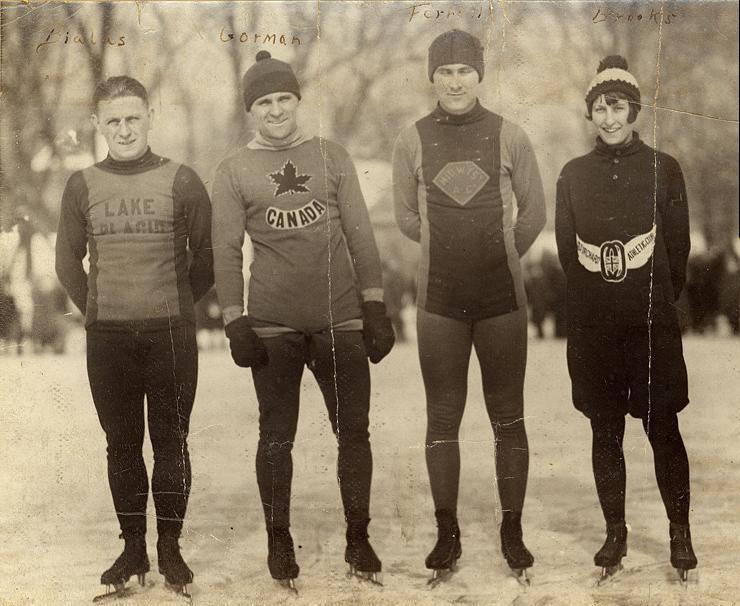
Valentine Bialas, from Utica, New York, Charles Gorman, from Saint John, New Brunswick, Ferrell, Lela Brooks, from Toronto, Ontario at Lily Lake in 1926

== Lily Lake Pavilion ==
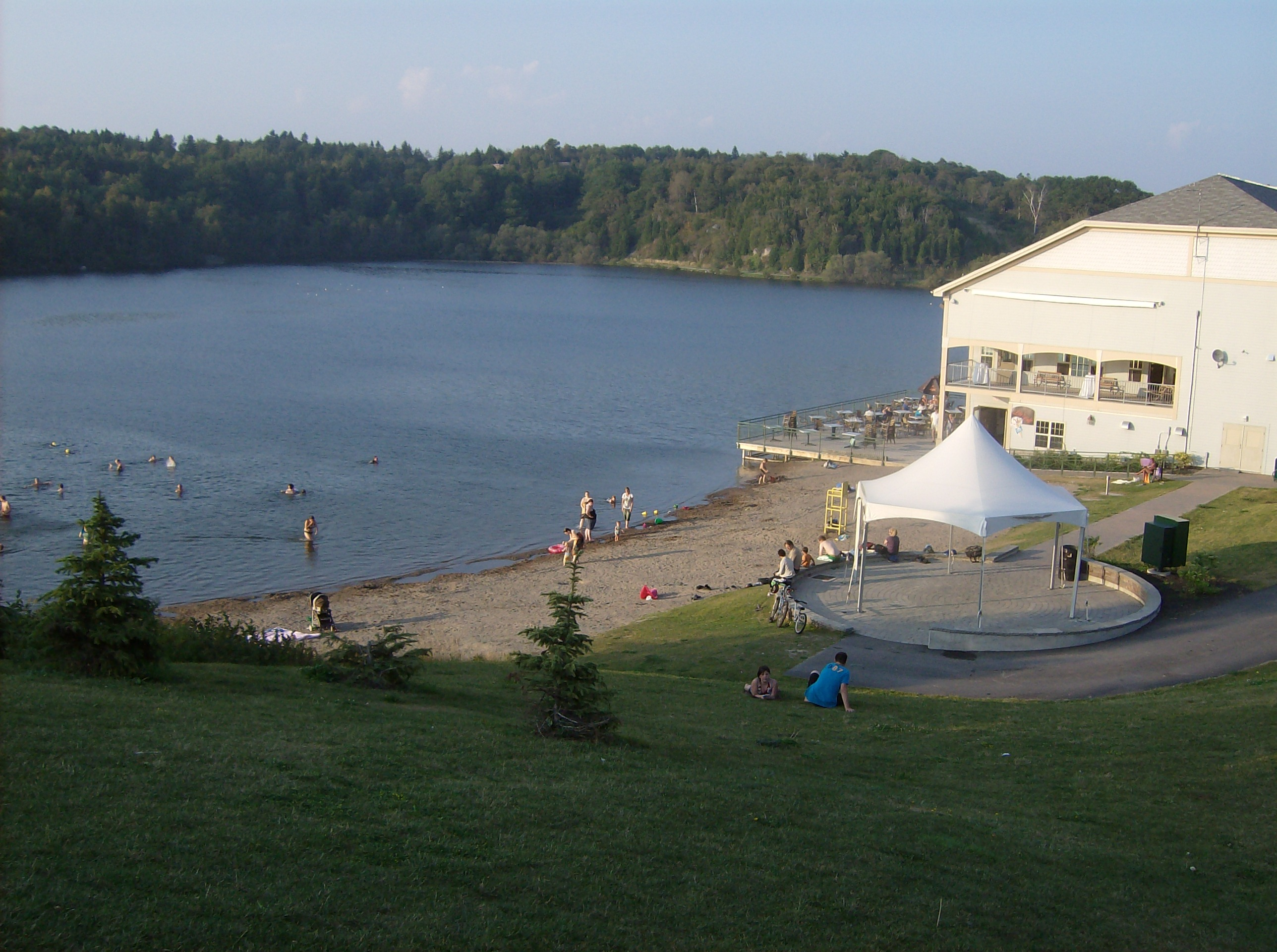
Lily Lake

In 1907, the grand Lily Lake Pavilion was inaugurated, only to be tragically destroyed by fire five years later. In 2006, following a complete restoration, the Lily Lake Pavilion reopened its doors and has since become a central hub of activity within Rockwood Park. The Pavilion is currently operated by Lily Lake Pavilion Inc., a registered charity. In 2012, when the striking granite sculpture Sunshine and Moonlight Over Saint John, created by Japanese artist Hiroyuki Asano, was installed at the park's entrance.

== Venues ==
- Lily Lake Pavilion
- Lily Lake Spa
- Inside Out Nature Center (Rock-climbing, guided hikes, outdoor equipment and boat rental)
- Beaches at Fisher Lake and Lily Lake
- Campground
- Golf course and driving range

== See also ==
- American Water Landmark - Lily Lake Reservoir (awarded 1982)
