= Hunt Downing House =

Historic house in Pennsylvania, United States

- U.S. National Register of Historic Places
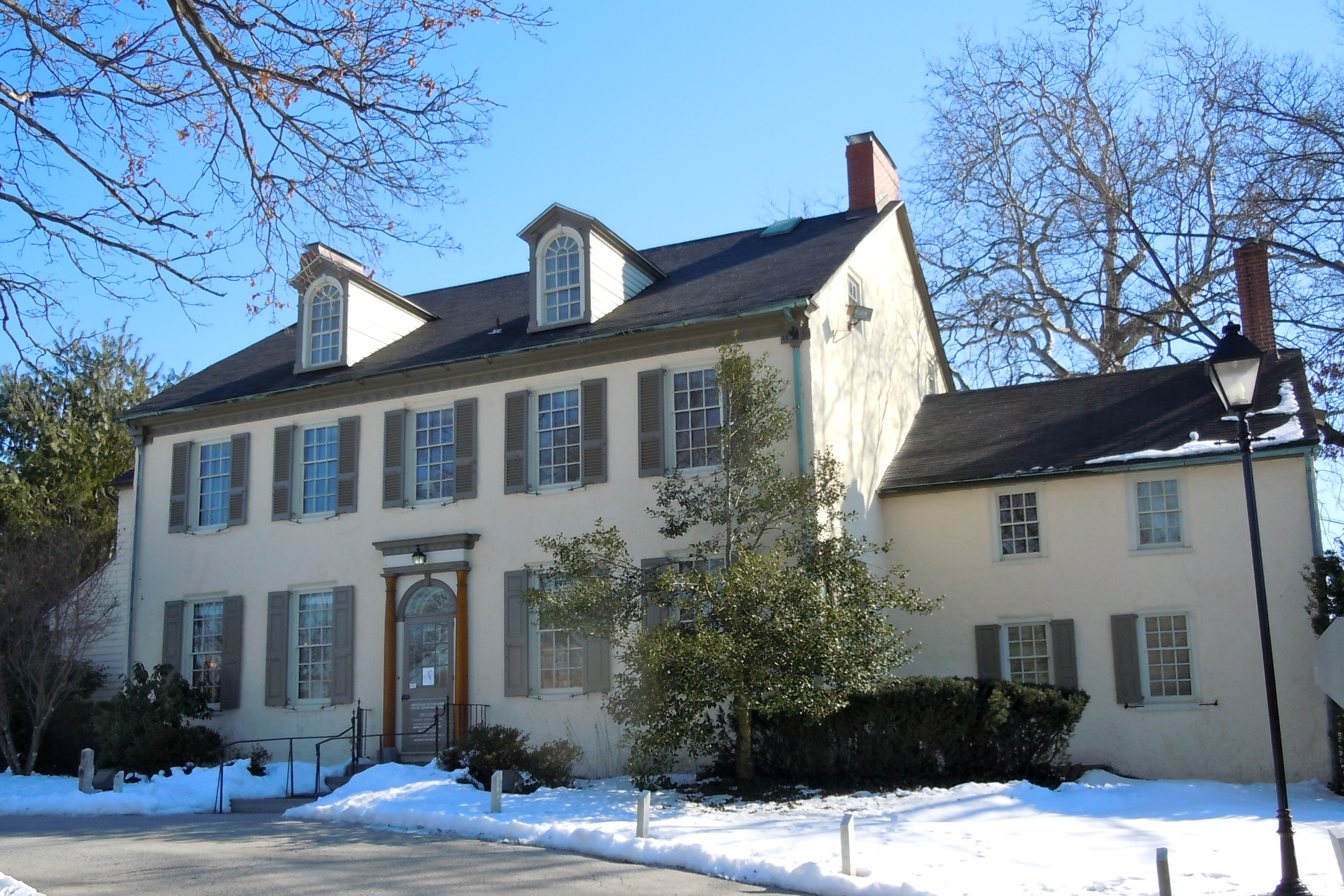
- Hunt Downing House, February 2011

- Location within Pennsylvania Location within the United States
- Location: 600 West Lincoln Highway near Exton, West Whiteland Township, Pennsylvania
- Coordinates: 40°1′13″N 75°39′35″W
- Area: 5.8 acres (2.3 ha)
- Built: c. 1810
- Architectural style: Federal
- MPS: West Whiteland Township MRA
- NRHP reference No.: 84003960, 90001343
- Added to NRHP: October 11, 1990, September 7, 1990

The Hunt Downing House, also known as Arrandale, is an historic home which is located in West Whiteland Township, Chester County, Pennsylvania.

It was listed on the National Register of Historic Places in 1990. A boundary decrease took place the same year.

== History and architectural features ==
This historic structure consists of a 2 1/2-story, five-bay, central block, which was built circa 1810, a kitchen wing, and a one-bay library addition that was built in 1946. The house was designed in the late Federal style. The main entrance features a semi-circular fanlight and column supported entablature. Also located on the property is a contributing stone great barn.
