= John Dunning =

John Dunning may refer to:

- John Dunning (businessman) (born 1934), British businessman, founder of Westmorland Motorway Services
- John Dunning (detective fiction author) (1942–2023), American writer of detective fiction
- John Dunning (true crime author) (1918–1990), true crime author
- John Dunning (snooker player) (1927–2009), English professional snooker player
- John Harry Dunning (1927–2009), British economist
- John Dunning (film editor) (1916–1991), American film editor
- John Dunning (film producer) (1927–2011), Canadian film producer
- John R. Dunning (1907–1975), American physicist
- Jack Dunning (John Angus Dunning, 1903–1971), New Zealand Test cricketer
- John Dunning, 1st Baron Ashburton (1731–1783), English lawyer and politician
- John Dunning (volleyball) (born 1950), American volleyball coach
