= Calybute Downing =

English clergyman

Dr. Calybute Downing (1605–1643) was an English clergyman, a member of the Westminster Assembly. Also a civil lawyer, he is now remembered for political views, which moved from an absolutist position in the 1630s to a justification of resistance to authority by 1640, within a contractarian setting.

== Life ==
He was son of Calybute Downing of the manor of Sugarswell in Shenington, in an exclave of Gloucestershire, (between Banbury, Oxfordshire and Upper Tysoe, Warwickshire), and Elizabeth Morrison née Wingfield, who married in December 1604 at Tinwell, Rutland. Tinwell was in the sphere of Stamford and Burghley House, reflecting the fact that Elizabeth and her brothers Robert Wingfield, M.P., of Upton, Northamptonshire, and John Wingfield, M.P. (for Stamford) of Tickencote, Rutland, were the daughter and sons of Elizabeth Cecil, sister of Lord Burghley. Calybute's unusual Christian name was the maiden surname of his paternal grandmother, Susan Calybut of Castle Acre, Norfolk.

He was baptised on 27 October 1605 at St. Andrews church, Northborough, Northamptonshire (now Cambridgeshire). He was admitted pensioner of Emmanuel College, Cambridge in 1623 but migrated as a commoner to Oriel College, Oxford in the same year, from which he proceeded B.A. (as 'Calbutus Downam') in 1626. He left Oxford and was apparently curate at Quainton, Buckinghamshire when on 2 December 1627 he married Margaret, the daughter of the rector Richard Brett. Downing's stepmother, Anne, daughter of Edmund Hoogan of Hackney, Middlesex, died at Quainton in December 1630 and was buried there.

Incorporated at Cambridge in 1629, he proceeded M.A. from Peterhouse in 1630. In 1632 he became rector of Ickford, Buckinghamshire, and about the same time of West Ilsley, Berkshire. At this time, at Oxford, he first published his Discourse of the State Ecclesiastical of this Kingdom in relation to the Civil, of which a second edition appeared in 1634. Competing unsuccessfully against Gilbert Sheldon for the Wardenship of All Souls' College, Oxford in 1636, in that year he exchanged with Sheldon the rectory of Ickford for the vicarage of Hackney, Middlesex, (where George Moore was rector), and resigned the living of West Ilsley. In 1637, the year in which Richard Brett died, he gained the degree of Doctor of both laws. According to Anthony à Wood, he aimed at a chaplaincy to Thomas Wentworth, and so wrote in favour of episcopacy. The diarist Samuel Rogers called him "our sad pastor", and dreaded having to hear his preaching.

Preaching before the Artillery Company of London on 1 September 1640, however, he stated that for defence of religion and reformation of the church it was lawful to take up arms against the king. Samuel Butler comments that Downing on this occasion was acting for Puritan leaders to test opinion, and that after preaching the sermon he went to the house of Robert Rich, 2nd Earl of Warwick at Little Lees, Essex. In the December following Downing made a petition to the House of Lords for the living of Hackney, on the grounds that the rector had received another incumbency. (Moore, who had been appointed in 1622, survived to subscribe as Rector in 1662 and died in office in 1664.) In 1641 Downing declared his views fully in committing four of his principal works to the press.

Wood states that Downing became chaplain to Lord Robartes's regiment in the Earl of Essex's army. On 31 August 1642 he preached a Fast sermon before the House of Commons. On 23 October following, the Battle of Edgehill was fought at the north end of Sugarswell Lane, two miles from his father's home. In 1643 he took the Solemn League and Covenant and was appointed, with Jeremiah Burroughs, for Middlesex in the Westminster Assembly; he sided with the Independents. He resigned the vicarage of Hackney on 3 May 1643, and on 20 June 1643 was appointed by parliament one of the licensors of books of divinity. He died suddenly soon afterwards: he was deceased by 2 November 1643, when the House of Lords approved the Commons nomination of John Dury to succeed him in the Assembly of Divines. According to Wood his father died of grief for him late in 1644.

== Biographical pitfalls ==
The Norfolk Visitation incorrectly shows him as the son of his father's second marriage to Ann Hoogan. Anthony à Wood gave Downing a bad character, not least because he mistakenly believed that he was the father ("father to a son of his own temper named George") of Sir George Downing, 1st Baronet, nephew of John Winthrop, a mis-affiliation which is repeated persistently in later sources. Despite the inconsistency of the given date, Wood associates him with Thomas Edwards's remarks in the Third Part of Gangræna (1646):

"August 16. 1646. Preached at Hackney one Master Downing, a Preacher of the Army, and a young Peters (as he was called), some who were eare-witnesses told me of his Sermon, and it was to this effect; That the Country people say (that is, he meant the Sectaries in the Army say) that the Parliament would do them good, but the Lord Major, the Common-Councell and the Citizens of London would not permit them; he feared God would bring the Plague upon them, and Risings among them; and the cause of all was, the uncharitablenesse of London against the Saints; and that the opposition now was not between worldly men, but between Saints and Saints. This Downing, alias Peter junior, spake in Hackney pulpit of the Common Councell of London at that time in way of aspersion of them as if they were for the Cavaliers, that when they entered Oxford, the Cavaliers told them, Tis your turn now, it may be ours hereafter, for we have the City of London and the Common-Councell for us."

"But behold" (adds Wood), "while he was in the height of these diabolicall and rebellious actions, he was suddenly, and as I may say most justly, cut off from the face of the earth and was no more seen." Ronald Bayne suspected that this Hackney preacher was a son of Dr Downing's, but the suggested son had died in childhood. As to Downing's character and motivations, Benjamin Brook took issue with several of Wood's statements. The will proved in P.C.C. for Calibut Downing in December 1644 is that of the father and not (as Venn supposed) of the pastor of Hackney.

== Family ==
The children of Calybute Downing and his wife Margaret Brett included:

- Calybute (baptized Quainton, October 1628: died young)
- Elizabeth (baptized Quainton, May 1630). Living 1653: Elizabeth and Ann sold their moiety of Sugarswell to John Goodwin, of Rollright, Oxfordshire, in 1653.
- Ann (baptized Quainton, March 1631/32). Living 1653
- Margaret (baptized Ickford, January 1633/34). Living 1644
- Jane (baptized Quainton, June 1636). Living 1644
- Henry (baptized Hackney, November 1640). Living 1644

== Works ==
- A Discourse of the State Ecclesiastical of this Kingdom in relation to the Civil, Oxford 1632; dedicated to William Cecil, 2nd Earl of Salisbury as from his chaplain. A second edition appeared in 1634.
- A sermon preached to the renowned company of the artillery, 1 September 1640 designed to compose the present troubles by discovering the enemies of the peace of the church and state, London 1641.
- A Discoverie of the False Grounds the Bavarian party have layd, to settle their own Faction and to shake the Peace of the Empire, considered in the Case of the Deteinure of the Prince Elector Palatine, his Dignities and Dominions, with a Discourse upon the Interest of England in that Cause, 1641; this is dedicated to the House of Commons.
- A Discoursive Coniecture upon the Reasons that Produce a Desired Event of the Present Troubles of Great Britaine, (Richard Hearne, London 1641).
- Considerations towards a Peaceable Reformation in Matters Ecclesiastical, 1641.
- An appeale to every impartiall, iudicious, and godly reader : whether the presbyterie or prelacie be the better church-government, according to the Word of God; being duely compared the one with the other, (Francis Coules and Henry Twyford, London 1641).
- The Cleere Antithesis, or Diametrall Opposition betweene Presbytery and Prelacy; wherein is apparently demonstrated whether Government be most consonant and agreeable to the Word of God, 1644. (This is a reprint of the 1641 'Appeale' with a new title.)

See also:

- Sermon notes, in a contemporary hand, of sermons preached during the summer of 1642 by Calibut Downing and other Parliamentarian sympathisers.
