= Downing (surname) =

Downing is an English surname. Notable people with the surname include:

- Antoinette Downing (1904–2001), American historian
- Andrew Jackson Downing (1815–1852), American landscape designer, horticulturalist and writer
- Arthur Matthew Weld Downing (1850–1917), Anglo-Irish astronomer
- Ben Downing (writer) (born 1967), American writer
- Benjamin W. Downing (1835–1894), American lawyer
- Brian Downing (born 1950), American baseball player
- Burton Downing (1885–1929), American racing cyclist
- Calybute Downing (1605–1643), English clergyman and political figure
- Caroline Lowder Downing (1855–1942), British suffragette
- Cecilia Downing MBE (1858–1952), Australian temperance and women's rights activist
- Charles Downing (died 1845), American politician
- Charles Downing (pomologist) (1802–1885), American pomologist and horticulturalist
- Charles W. Downing Jr. (1825–1862), Florida politician
- Christine Downing, author
- Coe S. Downing (1791–1847), New York politician
- Dean Downing (born 1975), English bicycle racer
- Edith Downing (1857–1931), British artist and suffragette
- Finis E. Downing (1846–1936), American politician
- Frank Downing (1907–1978), Australian politician
- Sir George Downing, 1st Baronet (1625–1684), Anglo-Irish soldier and statesman
- George Downing (surfer) (1930–2018), American surfer
- Georgia Downing (born 1999), British trampoline gymnast
- Greg Downing (born 1985), American lacrosse player
- Henry H. Downing (1853–1919), American politician
- Jack G. Downing (1940–2021), Central Intelligence Agency deputy director
- James W. Downing (1914–2018), American naval officer
- Jared Downing (born 1989), American mixed martial artist
- Jim Downing (born 1942), American racing driver, owner, and developer
- K. K. Downing (born 1951), guitarist and songwriter
- Keith Downing (born 1965), English former footballer
- Ken Downing (1917–2004), British racing driver
- Lewis Downing (1823–1872), Native American chief of the Cherokee nation
- Lisa Downing (born 1974), British author and academic
- Michael Downing (director), Canadian film director
- Michael Downing (politician) (1955–2015), American politician
- Paul Downing (1873–1944), American college football player and coach
- Quincy Downing (born 1993), American sprinter
- Reg Downing (1904–1994), Australian politician
- Russell Downing (born 1978), English cycling road-racer
- Sara Downing (born 1979), American actress
- Stephen Downing (producer) (1938–2025), American screenwriter, producer, activist, and journalist
- Stewart Downing (born 1984), English footballer
- Thomas Downing (painter) (1928–1985), American painter
- Thomas N. Downing (1919–2001), American politician
- Timothy J. Downing (born 1979), American attorney, politician, judge, and Army officer
- Walt Downing (born 1956), American football player
- Wayne A. Downing (1940–2007), American general
- W. H. Downing (1893–1965), Australian soldier and writer

== See also ==
- Downing (disambiguation)
- Dunning
- Downing baronets
