= Danne =

Danne is both a surname and a given name. Notable people with the name include:

== Surname ==
- Gunther Danne (1942–2025), German sport shooter
- Wolfgang Danne (1941–2019), German pair skater

== Given name ==
- Danne Boterenbrood (born 1985), Dutch triathlete
- Danne Larsson (born 1948), Swedish singer-songwriter, guitarist and businessman
- Danne Stråhed (born 1956), Swedish singer
- Danne Sundman (1973–2018), Finnish politician

== See also ==
- Danne-et-Quatre-Vents, a commune in the Moselle department in Grand Est in north-eastern France
