= T. B. Downing House =

Historic house in California, United States

- U.S. National Register of Historic Places
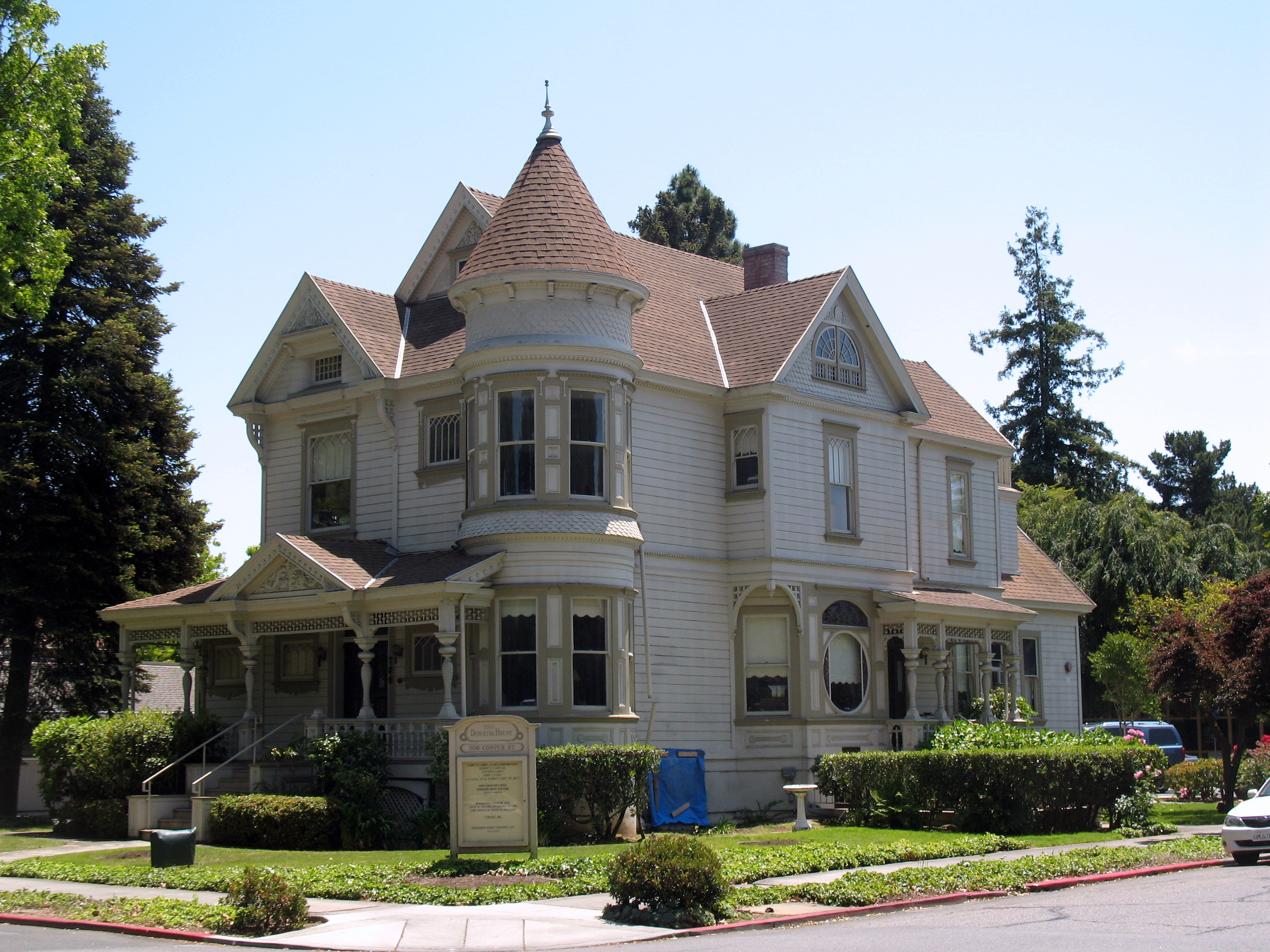

- Location within California Location within the United States
- Location: 706 Cowper St., Palo Alto, California
- Coordinates: 37°26′47″N 122°9′20″W
- Area: less than one acre
- Built: 1894
- Architectural style: Queen Anne
- NRHP reference No.: 73000452
- Added to NRHP: October 30, 1973

The T. B. Downing House is a historic house located at 706 Cowper St. in Palo Alto, California. The Queen Anne style house was built in 1894 for T. B. Downing, who served on Palo Alto's first city council. A conical tower tops the house's northern corner; the tower features a finial, a dentillated and bracketed cornice, and decorative shinglework. The porch features a decorated gable and gingerbread-style ornamentation along the roof, columns, and balustrade. Two other gables, one at the second floor and one at the attic, adorn the front of the house; both gables feature decorative bargeboards.

The house was added to the National Register of Historic Places on October 30, 1973.
