= Downing Vaux =

American landscape architect (1856–1926)

- Born: November 14, 1856; New York City, New York, U.S.
- Died: May 15, 1926 (aged 69); Kingston, New York, U.S.
- Occupation: Landscape architect
- Spouse: Lillian Baker Andrews (m. 1893)
- Children: Priscilla (1899)
- Parent(s): Calvert Vaux; Mary Swan McEntee
- Practice: Vaux and Company
- Projects: Downing Park; Hackley School; Riverside Drive; Wilderstein

Downing Vaux (November 14, 1856 – May 15, 1926) was an American landscape architect.

He was one of the eleven founding members of the American Society of Landscape Architects (ASLA) in 1899.

== Early life and education ==
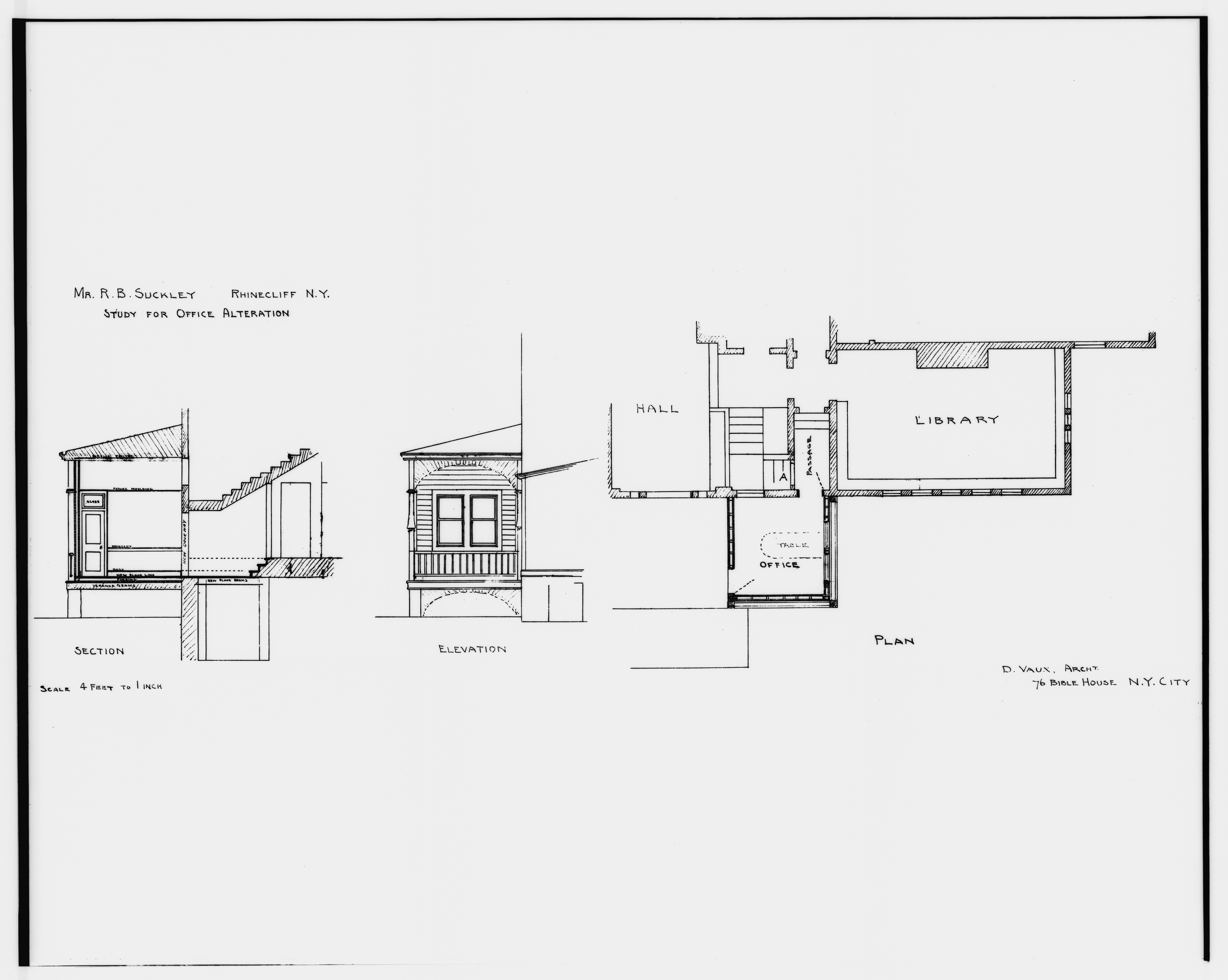
A sketch by Vaux in 1891 for Wilderstein.

Born to architect Calvert Vaux (1824–1895), and Mary Swan McEntee (1830–1892), Vaux was named after his father's mentor, Andrew Jackson Downing. He had one brother, Calvert Bowyer, and three sisters: Helen, Julia, and Marian. Vaux's uncle was the painter Jervis McEntee.

Vaux was an early associate of two other founding members of the ASLA: he attended boarding school in Plymouth, Massachusetts, with John Charles Olmsted, and worked with Samuel Parsons at Calvert's firm in the 1880s. In 1874, Vaux attended the Columbia School of Mines, but dropped out.

== Career ==
In the late 1880s, he assisted his father with the design for Riverside Drive in Manhattan in New York City and the Wilderstein estate's grounds in Rhinebeck, New York.

He was a member of the American Scenic and Historic Preservation Society, the Architectural League of New York, and the National Arts Club.

== Death ==
In 1926, Vaux committed suicide by jumping from the roof of a YMCA building in Kingston, New York. He was buried at Brookside Cemetery in Englewood, New Jersey.

== Personal life ==
In 1881, Vaux was engaged to Edwina Booth, daughter of the actor Edwin Booth, but the marriage was called off. On May 8, 1883, Vaux's father, Calvert, reported his son as missing to Inspector George W. Dilks and the New York Police Department.

In 1893, Vaux married Lillian Baker Andrews and they had one daughter, Priscilla, who was born on December 28, 1899, but lived only hours.
