= Downing Park (Newburgh, New York) =

Park in New York, United States

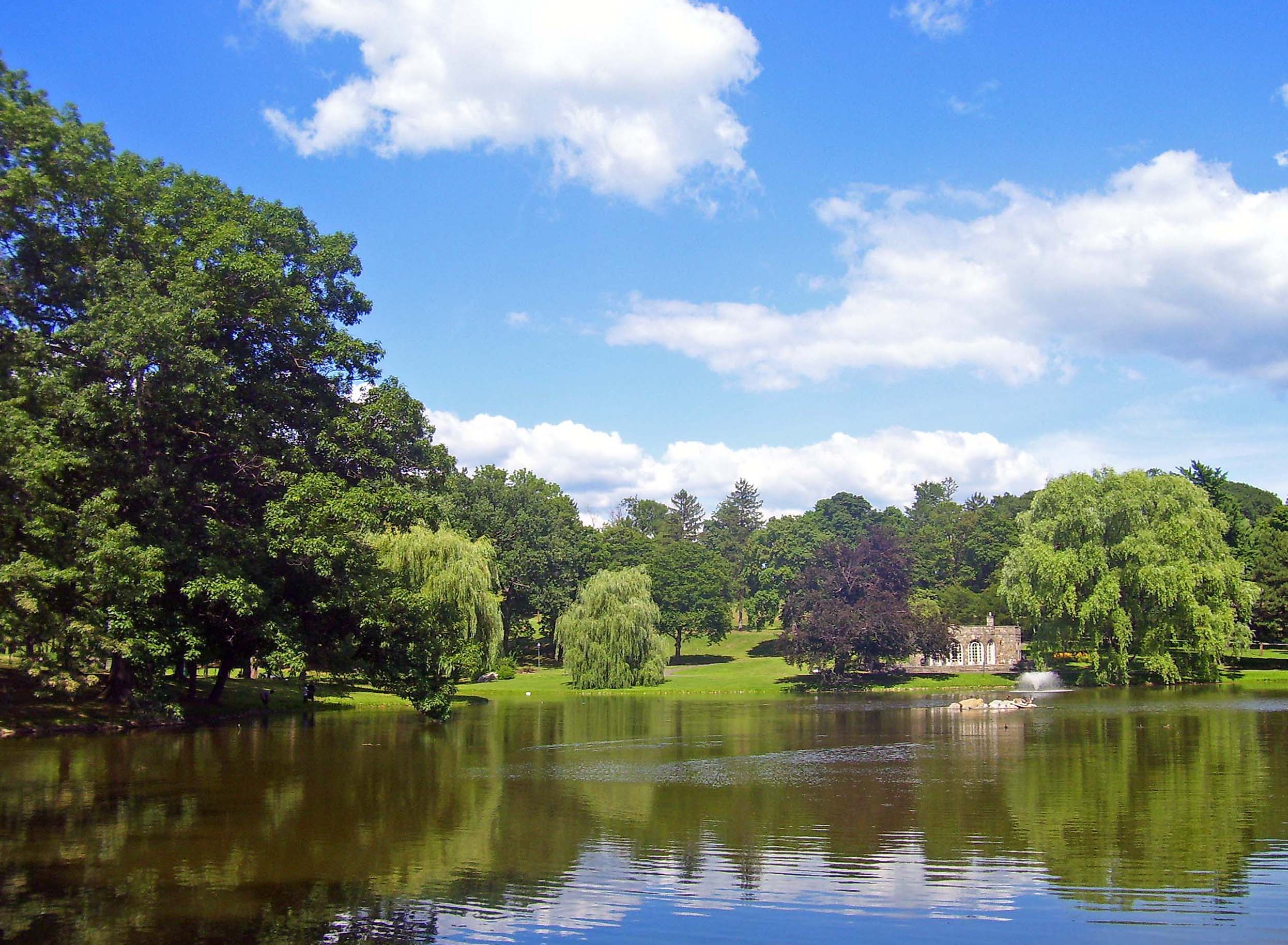
- The pond and fountain, known as the polly
- Interactive map of Downing Park
- Type: public park
- Location: Newburgh, NY, United States
- Coordinates: 41°30′22″N 74°01′06″W
- Area: 35 acres (14 ha)
- Created: 1897
- Operator: Downing Park Planning Committee, City of Newburgh

Downing Park is the largest of several public parks in the city of Newburgh, New York, United States. The park was designed in the late 19th century by Frederick Law Olmsted and Calvert Vaux, who gave the design to the city on the condition it would be named after their mentor, Andrew Jackson Downing, a Newburgh native who had died in a steamboat accident on the Hudson River in 1852.

== History ==
Most of Downing Park was a farm belonging to a family named Smith. The Smith's 1750s farmhouse stood at the present location of the pergola. The idea to build a park originated with Mayor Benjamin B. Odell in the late 1880s. The 25-acre Smith estate was acquired and later ten more acres were added. The City offered the design commission to Olmsted and Vaux, who delivered the plans in 1889. It was the last collaboration between the two. Vaux and Olmsted were well known for creating open spaces that promoted the well-being of the public, and they favored naturalistic, rustic, and curving landscape designs. Downing Park's 35-acres were designed to be a passive, contemplative environment in the center of the city. Construction started in 1894 and the park was opened in 1897.

In addition to the farmhouse, the park originally featured an observatory and a band shell. The observatory, designed by Calvert's son Downing Vaux, rested on the highest point in the park, commanding spectacular Hudson River views. At the turn of century, the farmhouse was turned into a smallpox sanatorium. In 1908 the flu epidemic ended; the city condemned the house, and it was burned to the ground. Later that year, architect Frank Estabrook designed the pergola to be built on the farmhouse foundations. The band shell was removed in the 1920s; the observatory was torn down in 1961 as part of an "urban renewal" project.

== Today ==
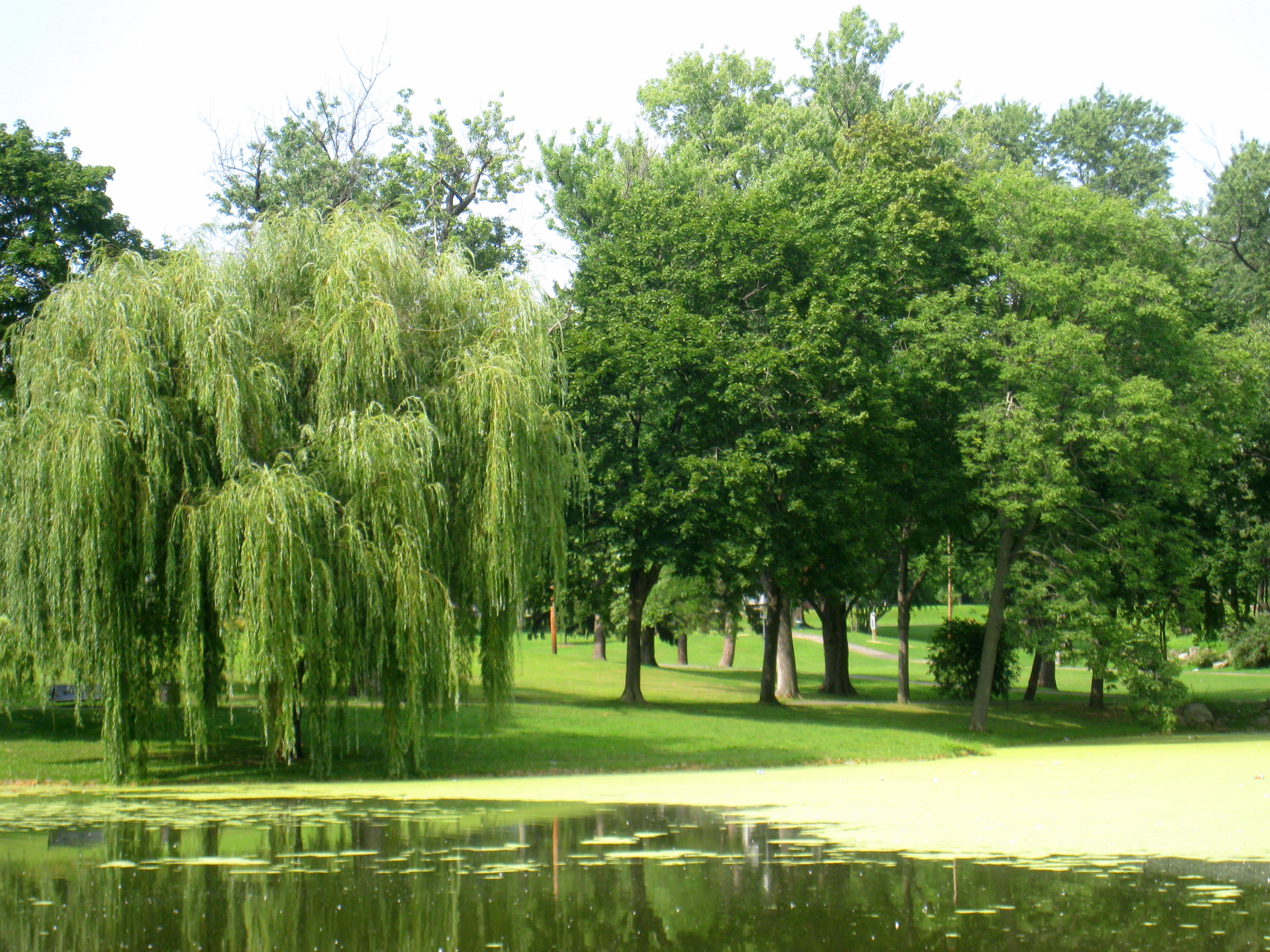
Downing Park, Newburgh, NY

Downing Park is centrally located within the city, between Robinson Avenue (US 9W-NY 32) on the west, South Street on the north, Dubois Street on the east and Third Street to the south. Carpenter Avenue divides the park into an eastern and western half. It is also in close proximity to Townsend Avenue and Newburgh's inner city.

The most prominent feature of the park is the pond and fountain in its southwest corner, known as the "polly." In the early 20th century, it was a popular place for ice skating in the winter, but that has since been prohibited as pollution has made the water less capable of effectively freezing up in the winter. The Polly's natural stone Shelter House, designed by local architect Gordon Marvel was added in 1934 and served as a place for visitors to change into skates and enjoy cups of hot chocolate during the cold winter months. It is now the headquarters of the Downing Park Planning Committee.

To the east, the land rises to a small hill, the terrace, which overlooks the Hudson. Other amenities in the park include an amphitheater to the north of the polly, host to many local concerts and festivals in the summer months.

=== Flora and fauna ===
Downing Park is home to the only dedicated ornamental daylily garden in New York, donated and maintained by the Iris and Daylily Society. A denizen blue heron is regularly observed fishing in the two-and-a-half acre Polly; a great white heron has also been observed. There are also brown mallards, wood ducks, snapping turtles, peregrine falcons, and visiting Canada geese.

=== Events ===
It also hosts the Newburgh Farmers' Market from July through October, and an annual Tuskegee Airmen's Family Day., and an annual Easter Egg Hunt The Greater Newburgh Symphony Orchestra hold free Summer Pops Concerts at Downing Park.
