= Lewis Downing Jr. House =

Historic house in New Hampshire, United States

- U.S. National Register of Historic Places
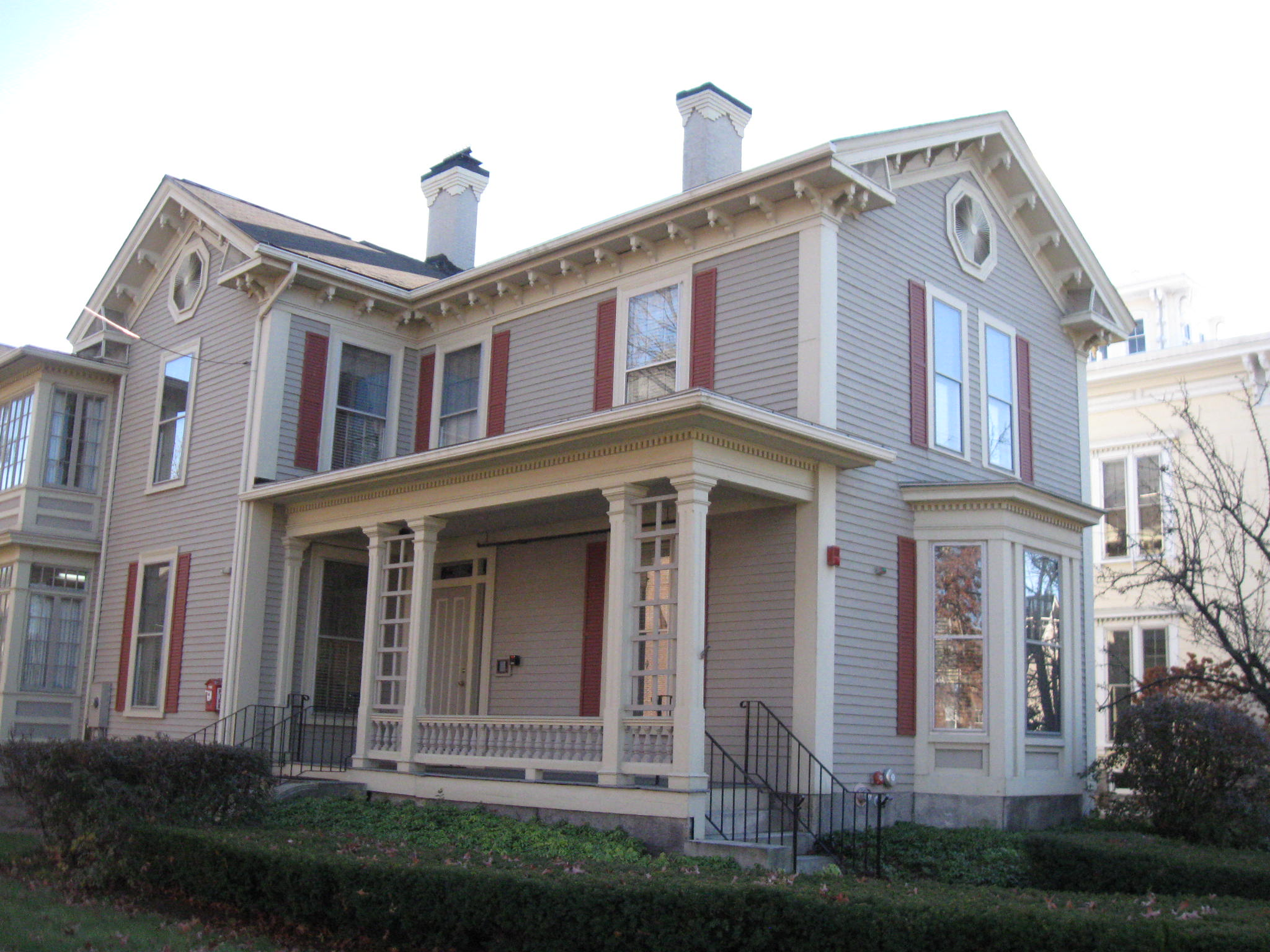

- Location within New Hampshire Location within the United States
- Location: 33 Pleasant St., Concord, New Hampshire
- Coordinates: 43°12′10″N 71°32′18″W
- Area: less than one acre
- Built: 1851
- Architectural style: Italianate
- NRHP reference No.: 87001425
- Added to NRHP: September 11, 1987

The Lewis Downing Jr. House is a historic house at 33 Pleasant Street in Concord, New Hampshire, United States. Built in 1851, it was home for fifty years of Lewis Downing Jr., president of the Abbot-Downing Company, a nationally known manufacturer of coaches, and is the only surviving building associated with that business. The house was listed on the National Register of Historic Places in 1987.

== Description and history ==
The Lewis Downing Jr. House is located about two blocks west of Main Street in central Concord, on the south side of Pleasant Street (U.S. Route 202). The house is basically rectangular, with cross-gable sections projecting from the sides. Its notable features include the paired brackets in the eaves, the chimneys, and the side porch, which retains some of its original styling despite 20th-century repairs and replacements. A late-19th-century garage at the rear of the property also has decorative touches such as bracketed eaves, and a side entrance framed by arched latticework.

This house was built in 1851 for Lewis Downing Jr., president of the Abbot-Downing Company, a nationally known manufacturer of coaches, and is the only surviving building associated with that business. It is a modest example of Italianate architecture, and is typical of Concord's mid-19th-century upper-middle-class residential construction. Downing's father had established a carriage-making business in Concord in 1813. In 1826, Downing Sr. and partner J. Stephen Abbott developed the very successful Concord coach. Downing Jr. took the helm of his father's business in 1865 and oversaw its greatest period of growth, opening shops in New York and Vermont, and selling products internationally as far away as Africa and Australia. His house, in which he lived until his death in 1901, remained in the family until 1919, and now houses professional offices.

== See also ==
- National Register of Historic Places listings in Merrimack County, New Hampshire
