= Downing House (Memphis, Missouri) =

Historic house in Missouri, United States

- U.S. National Register of Historic Places
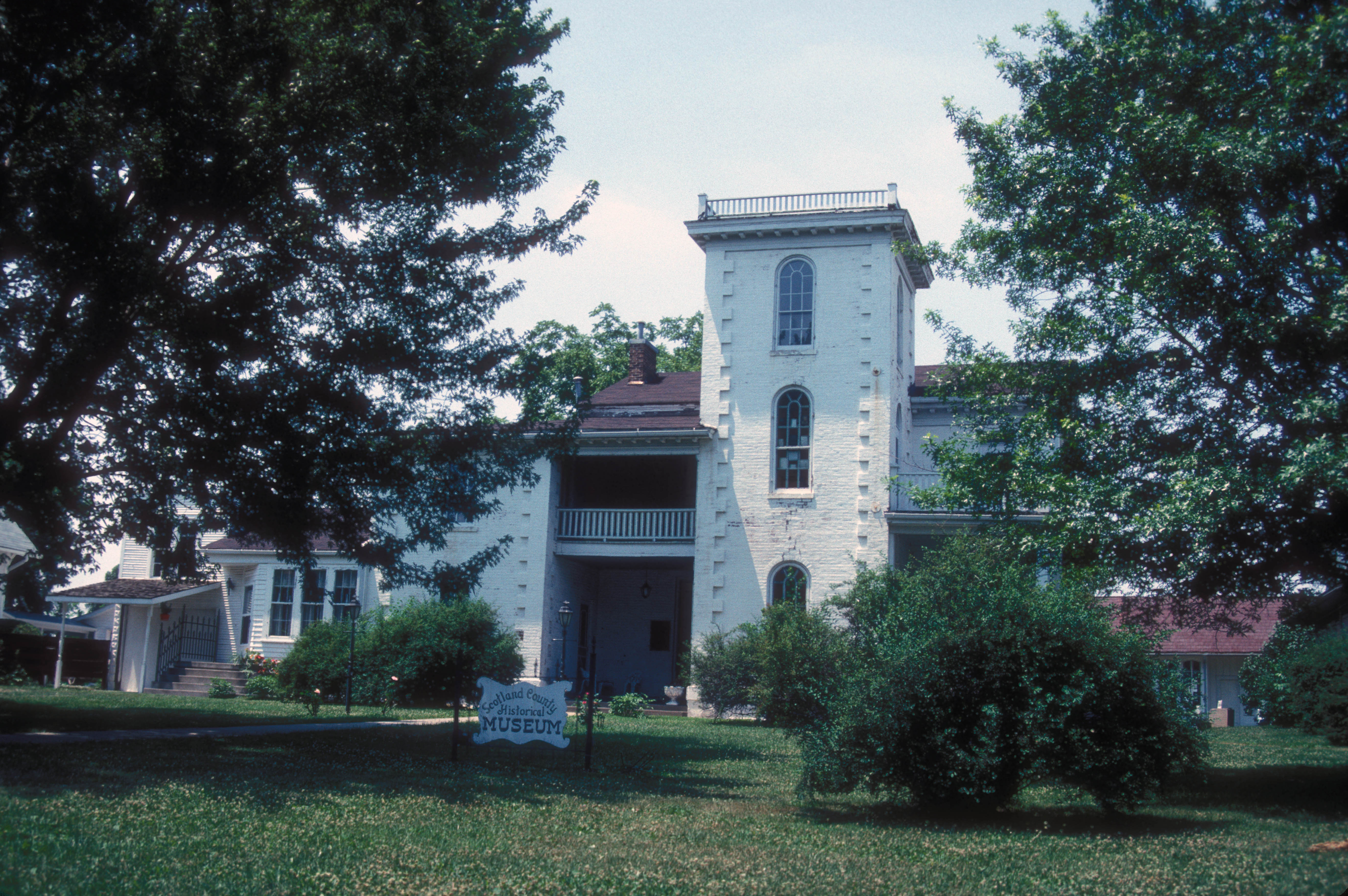
- Downing House, January 2007

- Location within Missouri Location within the United States
- Location: 311 S. Main St., Memphis, Missouri
- Coordinates: 40°27′22″N 92°10′15″W
- Area: 0.5 acres (0.20 ha)
- Built: c. 1858
- Architect: Broadwater, Thomas J.; Jenkins, Solomon
- Architectural style: Greek Revival, Italian Villa
- NRHP reference No.: 79001396
- Added to NRHP: June 27, 1979

Downing House is a historic home located at Memphis, Scotland County, Missouri. It was built about 1858, and is a two-story brick dwelling with Greek Revival and Italian Villa style design elements. It measures approximately 68 feet by 48 feet, and consists of a rectangular block with a T-shaped section. It features a three-story tower, prominent quoins, a modillioned cornice and a mixture of round-arched and linteled windows. The building houses a local history museum.

It was added to the National Register of Historic Places in 1979.
