= Dineen =

Dineen is an Irish surname. It is derived from the Gaelic Ó Duinnín ‘descendant of Duinnín', a diminutive of Donn 'dark, brown'. The Ó Duinnín were hereditary historians to the MacCarthy Mór. People with the surname include:

- Bill Dineen (1932–2016), ice hockey player and coach
- Bobby Dineen (1919–1984), Irish sportsperson
- Carolyn Dineen King (born 1938), American judge
- David Dineen-Porter (born 1979), Canadian actor, comedian and musician
- Donal Dineen (born 1969), Irish radio and television presenter, photographer, film maker
- Gary Dineen (1943–2006), Canadian hockey personality
- Gord Dineen (born 1962), ice hockey player and coach
- Hannah Dineen, Irish camogie player
- James Owen Dineen (1920–1975), Canadian engineer and university administrator
- John Dineen (1935–2025), Australian footballer
- Kerry Dineen (1952–2015), baseball player
- Kevin Dineen (born 1963), ice hockey player and coach
- Molly Dineen (born 1959), UK television documentary director, cinematographer and producer
- Patricia Dineen (1936–1961), American figure skater, wife of Robert
- Patrick Dineen (born 1938), Irish cricketer
- Peter Dineen (born 1960), American ice hockey player
- Robert Dineen (1937–1961), American figure skater, husband of Patricia
- Seán Dineen (1944–2024), Irish mathematician
- Sylvester A. Dineen (1898–1950), American schoolteacher and politician

== See also ==
- Dinneen
- Downing
