= Dinneen =

Dinneen (Irish: Ó Duinnín for men, Ní Dhuinnín for women) is an Irish surname. The family was famous for having supplied generations of court poets to their overlords in the ancient kingdom of Corcu Loígde. According to historian C. Thomas Cairney, the O'Dinneens were a chiefly family of the Corca Laoghdne who in turn came from the Erainn tribe who were the second wave of Celts who settled in Ireland from 500 to 100 BC. The Uí Duinnín were then hereditary historians to the MacCarthy Mór.

Notable people with the surname include:

- Bill Dinneen (1876–1955), American baseball player
- Dan Dinneen (1870–1948), American businessman and politician
- John Dinneen (1867–1942), Irish politician
- Joseph F. Dinneen (1897–1964), writer
- Kevin Dineen, Canadian ice hockey player
- Michael Dinneen, American-New Zealand mathematician and computer scientist
- Patrick S. Dinneen (1860–1934), Irish lexicographer and historian

== See also ==
- Dineen
- Downing
- Irish clans
