= Thomas Birchet =

English Member of Parliament

Member of Parliament for Rye
- In office 1539–1542

Mayor of Rye
- In office 1538–1540
- In office 1548–1549

Personal details
- Born: c. 1497 Rye, Sussex, England
- Died: 1556 (aged 58–59)

Thomas Birchet (c. 1497 – 1556), of Rye, Sussex, was an English Member of Parliament (MP).

He was a Member of the Parliament of England for Rye from 1539 to 1542. He was Mayor of Rye 1538–1540 and 1548–1549.

Parliament of the United Kingdom
| Preceded by Richard Inglet; John Fletcher | Member of Parliament for Rye; 1539 – 1542; Served alongside: William Mede | Succeeded by John Fletcher; William Oxenbridge |
| Preceded by Richard Inglet | Mayor of Rye; 1538 – 1540; 1548 – 1549 | Succeeded by Thomas Fletcher |
