= John Macop =

English Member of Parliament

John Macop or Makoc (before 1391 - 1410 or after), of Rye, Sussex, was an English mayor and Member of Parliament (MP).

He was a Member of the Parliament of England for Rye September 1388. He was Mayor of Rye August 1404-5.

Parliament of England
Preceded by Stephen Elyot; William Marchaunt	Member of Parliament for Rye; Sept. 1388; With: William atte Vawte	Succeeded by Laurence Lunceford; Laurence Corboyle
