= Robert Marche =

English Member of Parliament

Robert Marche (born after 1522- died 1563), of Rye, Sussex, was an English Member of Parliament (MP).

He was a Member of the Parliament of England for Rye in 1559, in the first year of the reign of Queen Elizabeth I. He was Mayor of Rye 1561–2.

Parliament of England
| Preceded by Thomas Fletcher; Thomas Cheyne | Member of Parliament for HRye; 1559; With: Richard Fletcher | Succeeded by George Reynolds; John Bredes |
