= Elizabeth Brooke (writer) =

British writer

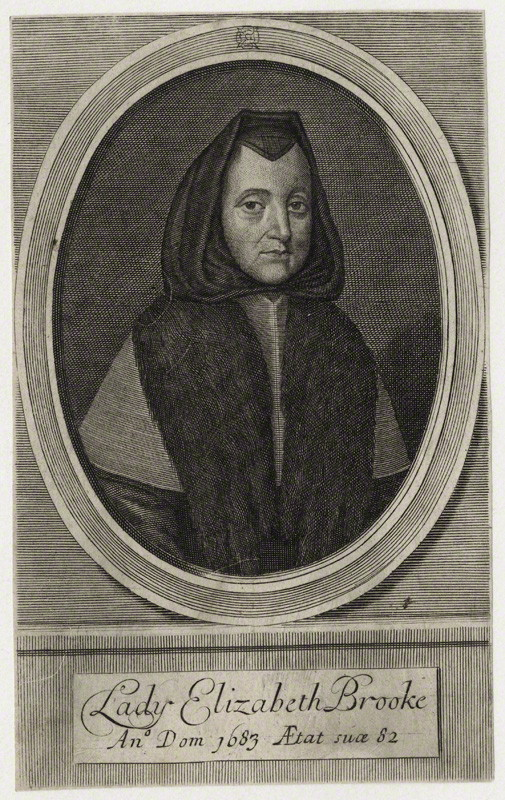
Dame Elizabeth Brooke (1601-1683)

Elizabeth Brooke (January 1601 – 22 July 1683), also known as Lady Brooke or Dame Elizabeth Brooke, was an English religious writer, part of whose writing of Christian precepts survives, and was matriarch of a landed manorial family in East Suffolk, East Anglia, during the English Civil War and Restoration periods.

An extended account of her religious thought and practice, written by her minister at Yoxford, Suffolk at the time of her funeral, was printed together with some of her own precepts. Her stance and practice was, like that of her brother Lord Colepeper, politically loyal to the Crown, and her allegiance was therefore to the established Church, but she and her husband, Sir Robert Brooke, lived and worked in close connection with the more Puritan or Presbyterian spirit among the gentry and magistracy of the neighbourhood, and supported a moderate and inclusive policy towards ministers inclined to Nonconformism within the church at large.

== Origins ==
Elizabeth Brooke was born Elizabeth Colepeper in 1601 at Great Wigsell in the parish of Salehurst in East Sussex, the only daughter of Thomas Colepeper (MP for Winchelsea in 1597 and for Rye in 1601) by his first wife Anne Slaney (died 1602). Anne was daughter of Sir Stephen Slaney, citizen and Skinner, Alderman of London 1584-1608 and Lord Mayor of London 1595-96, who died in 1608, and his wife Margaret Fesaunt (died 1619). Elizabeth's full brothers from this marriage were Slaney Colepeper (died 1618) and John, the latter of whom was afterwards created Lord Colepeper of Thoresway.

Following Anne Colepeper's death in 1602 Thomas remarried to Mary, daughter of Roger Beeston, Merchant Taylor of London (died 1600) and widow of Francis Gibbon of Benenden, Kent, by whom he had a further son and three daughters. Elizabeth's upbringing was entrusted to her maternal grandmother Dame Margaret Slaney, and Thomas Colepeper died in 1613 leaving provision for a dowry of £700 for her. Dame Margaret Slaney lived down to 1619 and, having made bequests of £1000 to each of the three children of her daughter Anne Colepeper, by her codicil made after the death of Thomas Colepeper (whom, she felt, had insufficiently advanced them) added a further £1000 for each of the sons and an additional £1500 for Elizabeth, to be paid to her on her marriage or at age 21. Dame Margaret further disposed that, if her granddaughters Elizabeth and Katherine should be unmarried at the time of her decease, then their upbringing and care should be in the hands of her daughter Dame Mary Weld.

== Marriage ==
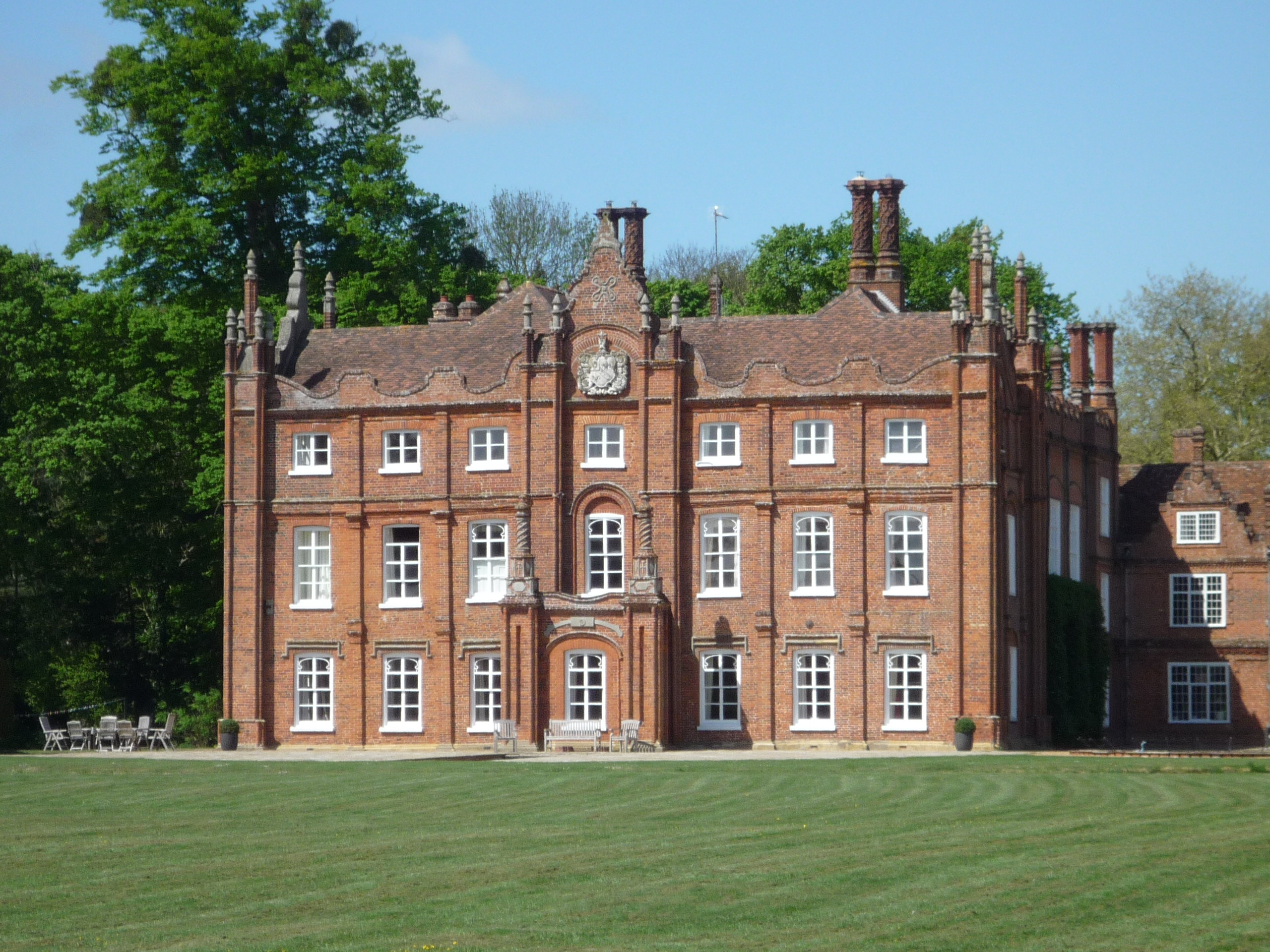
Cockfield Hall, Yoxford

In 1620 Elizabeth married Sir Robert Brooke, son of a prominent London citizen and Grocer, Alderman (1590-1599) and Sheriff of London (1591-92). A great-grandson of Reginald Brooke of Aspall (younger brother of Edward Brooke, 6th Baron Cobham), Robert was educated at Emmanuel College, Cambridge and at Grays Inn, and was a notable patron of devout clergy. He had first been married, in October 1597, to Joan, a daughter of Sir Humphrey Weld, Sheriff of London in 1599-1600, also a leading City Grocer. At the time of Robert Brooke's first marriage, Brooke's father, who died in 1600, had purchased for him the manor and mansion of Cockfield Hall at Yoxford, Suffolk, from Sir Arthur Hopton, son of Sir Owen Hopton, Lieutenant of the Tower of London, whose country seat this had been. During his first marriage, which was childless, Brooke had completely rebuilt Cockfield Hall, and at her death aged 38 in 1618 Joan Brooke was buried in Yoxford church.

Joan was a daughter of Sir Humphrey Weld's first marriage, to Anne Wheler. After Dame Anne's death, Sir Humphrey had remarried to Mary Slaney, Elizabeth Colepeper's maternal aunt. Alderman Sir Humphrey Weld died in 1610, and Dame Mary, who had remained childless, became his wealthy and devout widow. After Elizabeth's marriage to Robert Brooke in 1620, for two years the pair lived in London as boarders with Dame Mary Weld. Dame Mary died in 1622 or 1623, making generous further legacies to Elizabeth her niece, and mentioning Robert and Elizabeth's daughter Mary Brooke.

At about this time John Colepeper sold his family home of Wigsell to Cheney Colepeper, and it was afterwards demolished and rebuilt. Sir Robert, meanwhile, bought a residence at Abbots Langley in Hertfordshire, so that Dame Elizabeth could live within reach of her friends in London, before moving more permanently to Yoxford in Suffolk. During this time her house was frequented by the puritan Dr. Richard Sibbes (died 1635), Master of Katharine Hall, University of Cambridge, and Preacher to Grays Inn, who used to say that he went to other places mostly to satisfy others, but to the Brooke house to please himself. Among the manuscripts of her writings left at her death was included a quarto volume called a Body of Divinity, concerned with Christian Belief and Practice, dated A.D. 1631.

== The Brookes at Yoxford ==
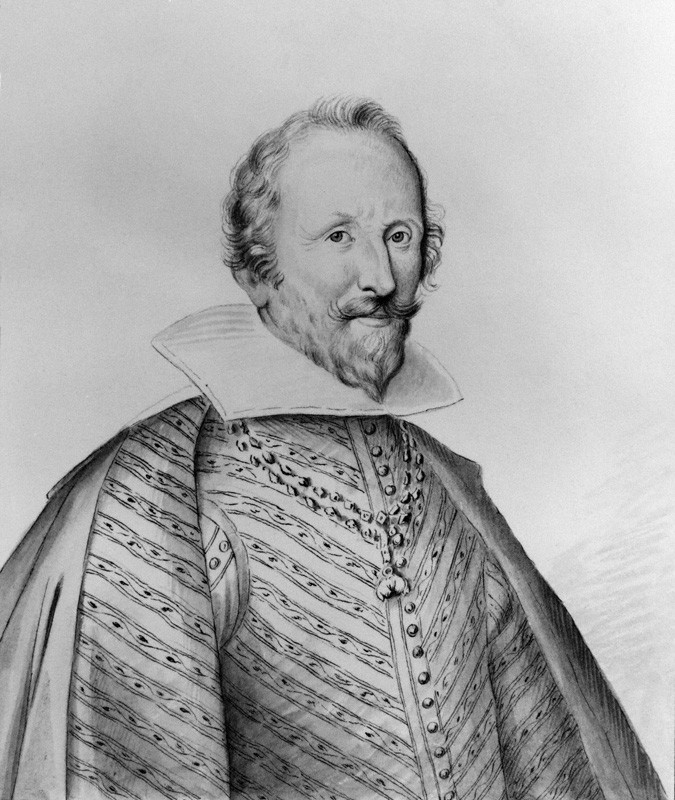
John, Lord Colepeper, Dame Elizabeth Brooke's brother

By the time the house at Abbots Langley was sold in July 1637, the seven children of Sir Robert and Dame Elizabeth had been born, and the eldest, Mary, was 16 years old. They were, however, no strangers to Yoxford. Through the 1620s Sir Robert had represented Dunwich in parliament three times, and his controversies with the townsfolk of Walberswick (which lay within his manor of Westwood at Blythburgh) had developed to a sustained level.

The years leading up to and through the English Civil War were those in which Dame Elizabeth's brother John Colepeper emerged as a prominent figure in the Royalist party. Having been knighted for military service and for his usefulness as an advisor, he sat in Parliament for Rye in 1640 and was elected for Kent in the Long Parliament. He worked for the impeachment of Sir Robert Berkeley and voted for the attainder of Thomas Wentworth, 1st Earl of Strafford, and had a place on the committee of defence in 1641. However, John found himself in opposition to the proposed ecclesiastical reforms, more on account of their revolutionary than their religious tendency, and joined the Royalist party in January 1642.

He became Chancellor of the Exchequer from January 1642 to February 1643. He disapproved of the King's attempt to arrest John Pym and other members in that year, but, having presented the King's peace proposals to the Commons in August 1642, he took part in Prince Rupert's charge at Edgehill. He was appointed Master of the Rolls (for the king) in January 1643, a position which he retained in principle until his death, although displaced by the parliamentarian William Lenthall from November 1643 until May 1659. Colepeper thereafter emerged as a military adviser, who was disliked by Prince Rupert for his desire to seek peace by compromise, especially after he was raised to the peerage as Baron Colepeper of Thoresway in October 1644. With the Royalist defeat in March 1646 Colepeper escaped to France where he joined Henrietta Maria and Lord Jermyn. He became a supporter of Prince Charles in exile.

Sir Robert Brooke had suffered a temporary setback in his quarrel with the commoners of Walberswick in 1642, who had brought a lawsuit against him, but had begun the work of reinforcing his own interests against them. Together with other local gentry, he was created an Elder of the Halesworth Congregational classis in 1645. On 10 July 1646 he died, aged 74, and was buried in Yoxford church.

== Widowhood in Yoxford ==
Commonwealth and Restoration

For two years after Sir Robert's death, Dame Elizabeth (aged 45 in 1646) was away from Suffolk. It was at about the time of the King's execution that she returned to Cockfield Hall and commenced her long last residence there, some 35 years in which as dowager she watched over her own family's misfortunes. The author of her eulogistic Life states that when the King was in his Enemies' hands, and they were planning to kill him, she became passionately concerned, and kept a private Fast in her closet hoping that the hand of Providence might avert that outcome. When she learned that God had permitted his death, as a judgement upon the Nation, she felt it with a mother's passions, saying that even the loss of one of her dearest children had not affected her so deeply. She referred probably to her daughter Elizabeth Bacon, who had died in the previous year aged about 25 leaving two infant children. She wrote to a friend,

"O that you were with us, though but for a few days, that we might bemoan our selves together, and this miserable Nation; upon which God poureth out so great Wrath, and yet such Spiritual Judgments are seized upon us! That many of us who pretend the greatest Interest in Him, can see nothing but Mercies and glorious Times: I find nothing so much moves me, as to hear Men, whom I hope I may call pious, speak concerning the Times; my Patience is so much put to it, as Rules of Wisdom and Policy can find no place with me. I can truly say, I dissent from many, whom I would honour, and whose Judgments I do in many things, prefer before my own, without any kind of Doubt, or Reluctancy, admiring, and standing amazed at their Delusions. I am now taught the great Danger of Evil Principles, strong Engagements, Spriritual Pride, &c."

Her eulogist continues: "In reference to His present Majesty, her Loyalty proceeded by these steps: She was a true Mourner under his Sufferings, Exclusion, Exile, and the Disappointment of several Efforts that were made for his Restitution. And she so disgusted the then usurping Powers, that she would not joyn in the keeping of either the Fairing or Thanksgiving Days appointed by them in reference to their Designs, or Successes. She rejoyced in all his Deliverances and especially in his Miraculous and Happy Restauration. And I do verily believe there was no Person in the three Kingdoms, that better understood than she did the Dignity of the High Station, to which God restored Him, or that paid Him a greater Veneration, or prayed more heartily for Him, or was more sollicitous for His Safety, in His Person and Government."

Household religion

Lady Brooke was noted for her devotion to the Crown, to the Church of England, to learning and to personal piety. She was highly respected for her generosity of character and towards all claims upon her charity. Although always conforming to the established Church, and opposed to Separatism, she advocated moderation and comprehensive inclusion of nonconformist ministers, and personally supported individual ministers. She was a tireless reader of the scriptures, of biblical commentaries and of the ancient philosophers in English translations. Dr Reynolds, Bishop of Norwich 1661-1676, having been entertained at Cockfield Hall, found her conversation excellent. She took care to provide for her family "the daily help of Prayer Morning and Evening, with the reading of the Scriptures; and on the Lord's-day the Repetition of what was preached in the Publick Congregation. And for their further Benefit, she many Years together procured a Grave Divine to perform the Office of a Catechist in her House, who came constantly every Fortnight, and expounded methodically the Principles of Religion, and examined the Servants, which was formerly done by her Chaplains, till the Service of God in her Family, and the Care of the Parish were committed to the same Person."

Family misfortunes

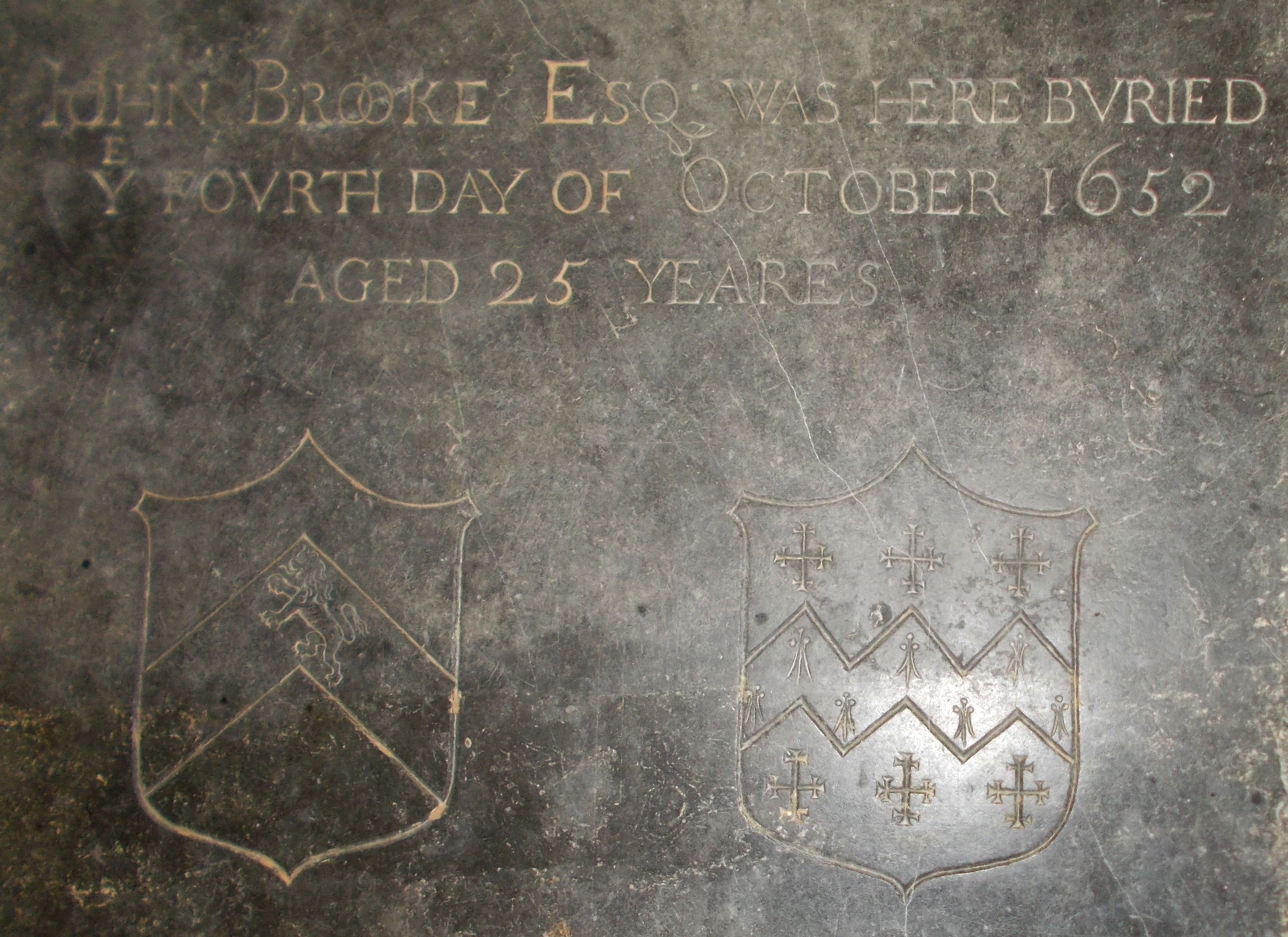
Memorial inscription for John Brooke, 1652, with Brooke and Barnardiston arms

The elder son John Brooke, who carried on his father's fight with the people of Walberswick and brought the matter to a height of trouble, died suddenly aged 25 in 1652 leaving a widow Jane (Barnardiston). The daughter Martha, who had married William Blois of Grundisburgh and had by him a son Charles, died in 1657, whereupon Jane married William Blois and became stepmother to the child. There remained a younger son Robert Brooke, now heir presumptive, who married Anne Margarett Mildmay in 1659. As the monarchy was restored, Dame Elizabeth's brother Lord Colepeper died in 1660.

Young (Sir) Robert Brooke began a very promising parliamentary career, inherited his father's estates and established himself as landowner, magistrate, and militia officer and commissioner, but died unexpectedly in a bathing incident near Avignon in 1669. For Dame Elizabeth, "the sharpest of all her Trials was the untimely Death of her last Son, [which] invaded her like an Inundation of Waters, threatening all the Banks both of Reason and Grace: Her Friends feared she would not long survive it. But the Power and Presence of God supported her, and she not only lived many Years after it, but also recovered again in a great measure her former Chearfulness." Through all this her unmarried daughter Mary remained with her, and young Charles Blois became the expected heir.

Dame Elizabeth was harassed by lawsuits, though these were eventually decided in her favour. She became deaf in 1675, and after long illness died at Cockfield Hall on 22 July 1683, making provision for Mary to have lifetime custody of her estates and for their eventual descent to Elizabeth's grandson Charles Blois. Her chaplain Nathaniel Parkhurst, vicar of Yoxford where she was buried, preached her funeral sermon. In the following year he published it with a portrait, a Life and an appendix of her writings, dedicating the book to her daughter Mary. Mary arranged for the marble wall monument to be set up in the Cockfield Chapel at Yoxford church, which records the death of both her parents, but devotes most of its inscription to her mother's character and virtues.

== Writings ==
The text supplied by Parkhurst, entitled Observations, Experiences, and Rules for Practice, consists of 63 printed pages (pp. 83-146) containing 61 Precepts with explanatory paragraphs. These evidently represent a transcript of one of Dame Elizabeth's manuscripts, "found written with her Ladiship's own Hand", which he says provides a most lively image of her mind, and hopes will be profitable for her readers. The following serves for an example:

"XLII. Faith is the Root of other Graces.

Faith is the Principle of Spiritual Life and Motion; every true good Work and Exercise of Grace take their Rise and Vigor from Faith. A Christian prays, reads, and meditates, hears, hopes, loves, is zealous for God, and doth good to others; Why? because he believes. What is Repentance and godly Sorrow, but the Soul acted by Faith upon the Belief of the Sinfulness of Sin, its Opposition and Contradiction to God; and of the high Obligations we are under to avoid it, and of the Misery we run into by venturing upon it, and of the Madness and Folly of ruining our selves by it.

I find Faith most necessary, and that I cannot be without it. Where can I go, or what can I undertake, wherein Faith will not be necessary? If I pray or meditate, it will be a strange Exercise if Faith be wanting. If I read or hear the Word, it will not profit me unless I mix it with Faith: would I hope in any Promise? I must call forth my Faith: Would I be heavenly-minded? it is Faith must raise me above the World: Would I be zealous for God? Zeal will not gather Heat unless Faith blows the Fire: Would I have Peace and Joy? they must be had by believing: Nay, I can do nothing in my more ordinary Affairs without Faith: I must know and believe my Design is good, and centers in my great Design, which is the Glory of God. And the means I employ must be known and believed to be regular and holy, or I dare not make use of them. And then I must be able to cast my Care upon God, and to commit the Event and Issue to him, or else my Business becomes burdensom to me, and I have no Rest in my self."

In addition to these, Parkhurst refers to "a great number of writings under her own hand", including her Body of Divinity written 1631, collections of Commentaries upon the great part of Holy Scriptures, and a collection of the Sum of the Controversies between Us and the Papists.

== Children ==
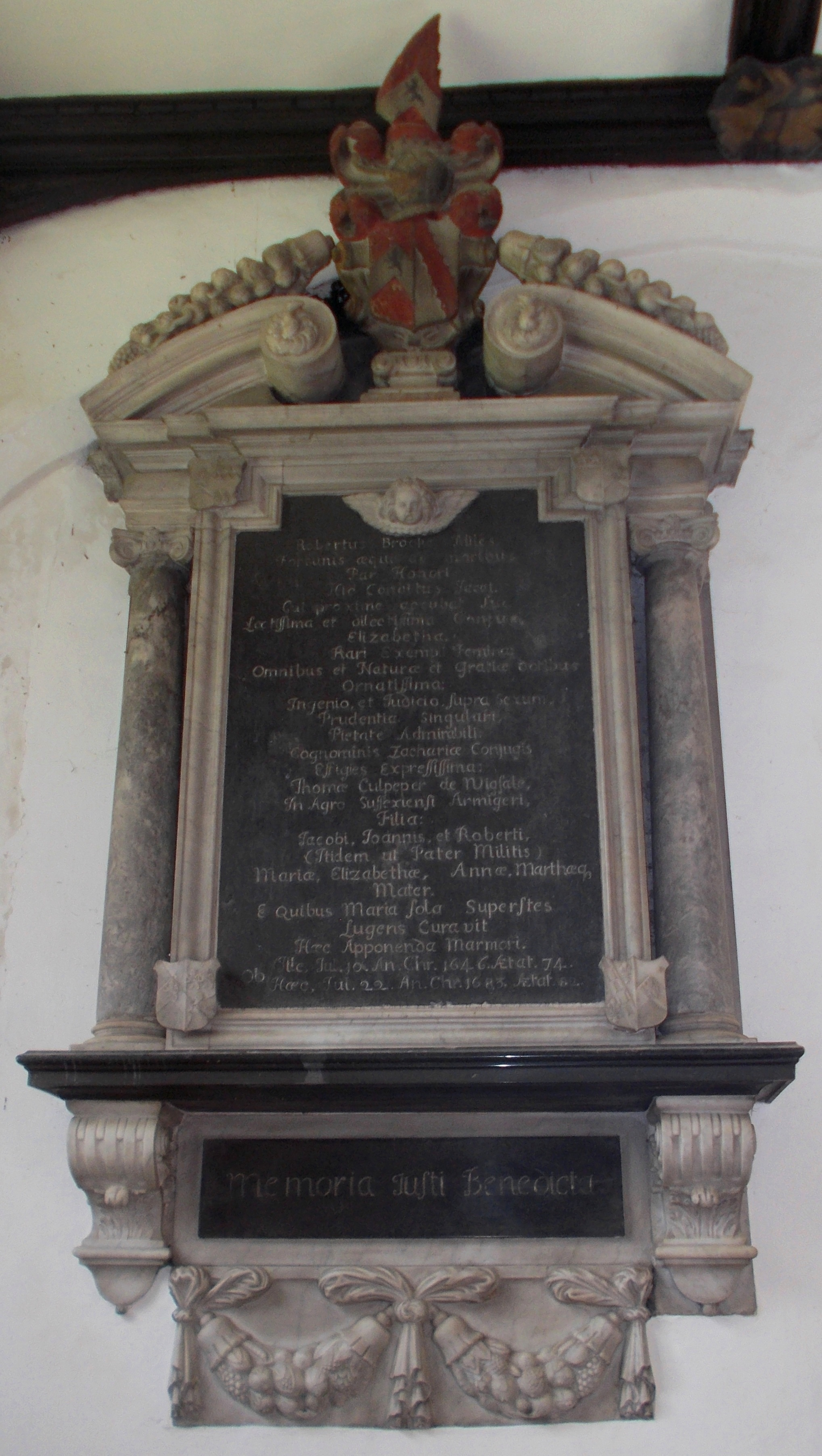
The Brooke monument at Yoxford, 1683

Sir Robert and Dame Elizabeth Brooke had three sons and four daughters:

- Mary Brooke, born c. 1621, who did not marry, lived at Cockfield Hall until her death in 1693.
- Elizabeth Brooke, born c. 1622, married Thomas Bacon (1620-1697) of Friston, Suffolk, and was the mother of Nathaniel Bacon, the Virginian colonist who led Bacon's Rebellion. She died in 1647/48 aged about 25.
- John Brooke, the heir, born c. 1626, married Jane Barnardiston, daughter of Sir Nathaniel Barnardiston (1588-1653) of Kedington and his wife Jane (daughter of Sir Stephen Soame). By this marriage the manor of Blythburgh was settled in jointure upon Jane, and it was as of Westwood Lodge that John made his nuncupative will, dying aged 26 in October 1652. His widow Jane, his universal legatee and administratrix, remarried to Sir William Blois, who was first married to John's sister Martha Brooke.
- Martha Brooke, born c. 1628, married Sir William Blois (the younger), by whom she had both sons and daughters. Their surviving son and heir, (Sir) Charles Blois, became sole master of Cockfield Hall in 1693 on the death of Mary Brooke. His mother Martha died in 1657 aged about 29, whereupon Sir William Blois remarried to Jane Barnardiston, relict of Martha's brother John Brooke. So Jane, who became Jane Brooke and then Dame Jane Blois, was the stepmother of Sir Charles. Sir William died in 1676.
- Anne Brooke (died in childhood).
- James Brooke (died in infancy)
- (Sir) Robert Brooke, born c. 1637, of Cockfield Hall, was MP for Aldeburgh. In 1659 he married Anne Margarett Mildmay, daughter of Sir Henry Mildmay of Wanstead, Essex. He died while bathing in the river Rhône at Avignon, France, in 1669.
