= Thomas Cheyne (MP for Rye) =

English Member of Parliament

Thomas Cheyne (by 1537–1566), of Westfield, Sussex, was an English Member of Parliament (MP).

He was a Member of the Parliament of England for Rye in 1558, the year Mary I of England died.

Parliament of England
Preceded by John Holmes; Reginald Mohun	Member of Parliament for Rye; 1558; With: Thomas Fletcher	Succeeded by Richard Fletcher; Robert Marche
