= John Hammond (died 1589) =

Member of the Parliament of England

John Hammond (1542–1589) was an English civil lawyer and politician.

He was a Member (MP) of the Parliament of England for Rye in 1584 and West Looe in 1586.

== Life ==
His mother was a sister of Alexander Nowell. He was baptised at Whalley, Lancashire, in 1542, and was educated at Trinity Hall, Cambridge, where he became fellow, and in 1561 proceeded LL.B.

Hammond addressed Queen Elizabeth in a short Latin speech when she visited his college on 9 August 1564. In 1569 he was created LL.D. and admitted a member of the College of Civilians. On 6 February 1570 he became commissary of the deaneries of the Arches, Shoreham, and Croydon; in 1573 commissary to the dean and chapter of St Paul's Cathedral; a master of chancery in 1574; and chancellor of the diocese of London in 1575.

Hammond acted on two commissions in 1577, one with reference to the restitution of goods belonging to Portuguese merchants, and the other concerning complaints of piracy preferred by Scots. In 1578 he attended the diet of Schmalkalden as a delegate from the English government, and in August 1580 went to Guernsey to investigate charges brought by the inhabitants against Sir Thomas Leighton, the governor.

In the period March 1580 – 1581 Hammond took part in the examination by torture of Thomas Myagh, a prisoner in the Tower, charged with treasonable correspondence with Irish rebels. From 1572 onwards he was an active member of the ecclesiastical court of high commission. In May 1581 he examined Alexander Briant, a Jesuit, under torture in the Tower of London, and later in the year conducted repeated examinations of Edmund Campion, preparing points for discussion out of Nicholas Sander's De Monarchia and Richard Bristow's Motives. On 29 April 1582 he similarly dealt with Thomas Alfield, a seminary priest, who was racked in the Tower.

Hammond sat as M.P. for Rye in the parliament meeting on 23 November 1585, and for West Looe in the parliament meeting in October 1586. He probably died in December 1589; his will, dated 21 December 1589, was proved on 12 October 1590. Some of his legal opinions survived in manuscript.

== Family ==
Hammond was father of John Hammond M.D.

Parliament of the United Kingdom
Preceded by Henry Gaymer; Robert Carpenter	Member of Parliament for Rye; 1584-1585; With: Robert Carpenter	Succeeded by Henry Gaymer; Robert Carpenter
Preceded by Geoffrey Gates; Thomas Lancaster	Member of Parliament for West Looe; 1586-1587; With: Richard Champernowne	Succeeded by Matthew Patteson; Robert Sanderson
