= Dannett =

Dannett is a surname. Notable people with the surname include:

- Thomas Dannett (1543–1601), English MP for Maidstone, brother of Audley
- Leonard Dannett (by 1530–1591), MP for Marlborough and Gatton
- Audley Dannett (c.1546-1591), MP for Rye, brother of Thomas
