= Thomas Fletcher (MP) =

English Member of Parliament

Thomas Fletcher (c. 1522 – 1568), of Rye, Sussex, was an English Member of Parliament (MP).

He was the son of John Fletcher, MP for Rye, and the brother of Richard Fletcher, also an MP for Rye. His wife was named Bridget.

He was a Member of the Parliament of England for Rye in 1558, the year Mary I died. He was Mayor of Rye 1549–50, during the reign of Edward VI.

Parliament of England
Preceded by John Holmes; Reginald Mohun	Member of Parliament for Rye; 1558; With: Thomas Cheyne	Succeeded by Richard Fletcher; Robert Marche
