= Baddyng =

Baddyng is a surname. Notable people with the surname include:

- John Baddyng (fl. 1382–1401), MP for, and mayor of, Rye, East Sussex, England
- Richard Baddyng (fl. 14th century), MP for Rye also and father of John Baddyng

== See also ==
- Badding
