= Mersey River =

Mersey River may mean:

- the Mersey River (Tasmania) in Tasmania, Australia.
- the Mersey River (Nova Scotia) in Nova Scotia, Canada.
- the River Mersey in Liverpool, England.

== See also ==
- Mersey (disambiguation)
