= William Mead =

William Mead may refer to

- William Mead (merchant) (1628–1713), prominent London Quaker
- William H. Mead (1921–1974), bishop of the Episcopal Diocese of Delaware
- William Perrett Mead (1889–1980), New Zealand and writer
- William Richard Mead (1915–2014), British geographer
- William Rutherford Mead (1846–1928), American architect

== See also ==
- Billy Mead (born 1999), English cricketer
- William Mede, English MP
- William Meade (disambiguation)
