= Richard Tufton =

Richard Tufton may refer to:

- Richard Tufton, 5th Earl of Thanet (1640/41–1684), MP for Appleby, Earl of Thanet
- Sir Richard Tufton, 1st Baronet (1813–1871), British baronet (see Baron Hothfield)
- Richard Tufton (MP, died 1631) (1585–1631), English lawyer and politician, MP for Grantham, and for Rye
