= Thomas Colepeper (died 1613) =

Member of the Parliament of England

Thomas Colepeper (c. 1561 – 1613) was an English Member of Parliament.

== Career ==
Thomas was the eldest of the four sons of John Colepeper of Wigsell (died 1612) in the parish of Salehurst, East Sussex: the others were William, John and Alexander, of whom William is thought to have died young. Their mother was Elizabeth (died 1618), daughter of William Sedley of Southfleet, Kent. He matriculated at Hart Hall, Oxford in 1579 and entered the Middle Temple in 1583, where he was still in residence as an inner barrister in 1596.

It is claimed that Colepeper's later interest in the colonization of America was stimulated by his attachment to the Middle Temple, where the great voyages of that age were a current preoccupation. In 1597 he married the daughter of a leading overseas merchant, Alderman Stephen Slaney, Lord Mayor of London in 1595.

He was a Member (MP) of the Parliament of England for Winchelsea in 1597 and Rye in 1601. His predecessor as MP for Rye, Sampson Lennard, was the brother of Colepeper's brother-in-law Samuel Lennard, whose wife Elizabeth was the sister of Thomas's first wife Anne Slaney. Samuel and Elizabeth were the parents of Stephen, the first of the Lennard baronets of West Wickham, Kent.

Both Thomas Colepeper and his brother John Colepeper "of Feckenham" (1563-1635), were members of the Virginia Company of London from 1609, and this interest was passed down in both of their families. From this connection arose the family proprietorship in the Northern Neck in Virginia. John Colepeper "of Feckenham" was the father of that Thomas Colepeper who married his cousin Katherine St Leger: their children included John Colepeper (born 1633), leader of Culpeper's Rebellion, and Frances Colepeper (born 1634), wife successively of Samuel Stephens, Sir William Berkeley and Philip Ludwell of Virginia.

== Legacy ==
His father John Colepeper dying in 1612, aged 82, Thomas died in the following year and was buried at Salehurst on 19 September 1613. He left his estate to his eldest son and heir Slaney Colepeper, to inherit at the age of 24. These included his manor of Wigsell and also the manor of Harrenden in Sandhurst and Newenden in Kent. (At the time of his inquisition post mortem in 1614, Thomas's mother Elizabeth was living at Newenden.) However Slaney died in 1617, before he could inherit, and therefore John the second son became the heir of Wigsell. John, the future John Colepeper, 1st Baron Colepeper of Thoresway (1600-1660), in time became a leading royalist politician during the 1640s and 1650s.

== Family ==
Thomas Colepeper first married Anne (died 1601/02), one of the three daughters of Sir Stephen Slaney, Lord Mayor of London, with whom he had 2 sons and a daughter:

- Slaney Colepeper, born 1598, son and heir. He matriculated at Hart Hall, Oxford, in April 1616 aged 17, and entered the Middle Temple in 1617. He died in 1617 while still in minority
- John Colepeper (baptized Salehurst, 17 August 1600). He entered Hart Hall, Oxford and the Middle Temple at the same time as his brother. He became a leading royalist politician as Chancellor of the Exchequer (1642) and Master of the Rolls (1643) to King Charles I, was created 1st Baron Colepeper of Thoresway in 1644, and continued a senior figure in the service of Charles II during his exile. He succeeded to his father's estate. He died in 1660.
- Elizabeth Colepeper, died 1683 aged 82, who in 1620 became the second wife of Sir Robert Brooke, and lived a widow for many years at Cockfield Hall, Yoxford, Suffolk. (Brooke's great-grandfather Reginald Brooke was a younger brother of Edward Brooke, 6th Baron Cobham.) Elizabeth left a body of religious writings.

He married secondly Mary (died 1660–1661), the daughter and coheiress of Roger Beeston of London (and widow of Francis Gibbon of Benenden, Kent, father of her son Edmund), with whom he had another son and 3 daughters:

- Thomas Colepeper, baptized 13 December 1607 at Hawkhurst, buried 30 December 1607 at Salehurst
- Mary Colepeper, baptized Salehurst, 10 August 1606
- Cicely Colepeper, baptized Salehurst, 8 July 1610
- Anne Colepeper, baptized Hawkhurst, 10 November 1611; married Thomas Scott of Smeeth on 3 November 1636 at Frittenden, Kent.

Parliament of England
Preceded by Adam Ashburnham; Ashburnham Pecke	Member of Parliament for Winchelsea; 1597–1601; With: Moyle Finch	Succeeded by Adam White; Thomas Unton
Preceded by Sampson Lennard; Thomas Hamon	Member of Parliament for Rye; 1601–1604; With: Sir Arthur Gorges	Succeeded by Thomas Hamon; John Young
