= William Meade (disambiguation) =

William Meade was a bishop.

William Meade may also refer to:

- William K. Meade, American politician in Arizona
- William Meade (judge), Irish lawyer and judge

== See also ==
- William Mead (disambiguation)
- William Mede, English MP
