= Mercey =

Mercey may refer to:

== Communes in France ==
- Mercey, Eure, in the Eure department
- Mercey-le-Grand, in the Doubs department
- Mercey-sur-Saône, in the Haute-Saône department

== Other uses ==
- Mercey Brothers, a Canadian country music group
- Tom Mercey, an English rugby union footballer

== See also ==
- Mercy
- Mersey (disambiguation)
