= Robert Brooke (MP for Dunwich) =

English landowner, magistrate, commissioner, administrator and MP

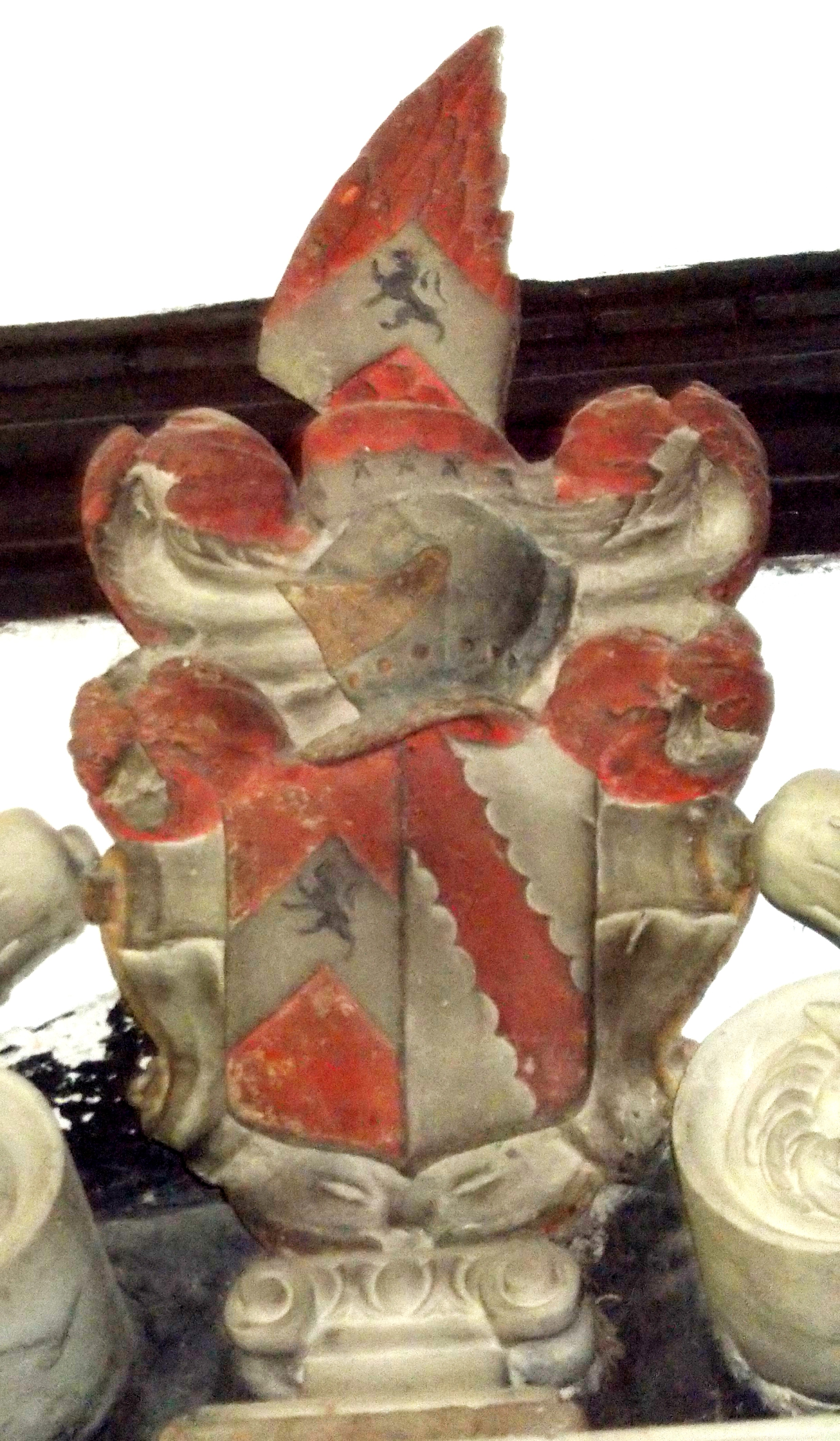
Arms of Sir Robert Brooke in his second marriage to Elizabeth Colepeper, from his monument at Yoxford, 1683

Sir Robert Brooke (c. 1572 – 10 July 1646) was an English landowner, magistrate, commissioner, administrator and MP who sat in the House of Commons between 1624 and 1629. He made his country seat at Cockfield Hall, Yoxford, Suffolk.

== Origins ==
Robert Brooke was the son of Robert Brooke, citizen and Grocer of Bucklersbury in London, Sheriff of London (1590–91) and Alderman (1590–99), and his wife, Ursula, daughter of Robert Offley, who married 5 May 1572 at St Benet's, London. The Brooke family were seated of old at Holditch manor in Thorncombe, Devon (now Dorset), where Sir Thomas Brooke, MP (died 1418) and his wife, Joan (née Hanham; died 1437), have a monumental brass memorial.

Their son, Sir Thomas Brooke (c. 1391–1439), married Joan Braybrooke (1404-1442), at Cooling Castle, Kent in 1410, and on the death of her mother (Joan, Lady Cobham), in 1434, the title passed to Joan Brooke as 5th Baroness Cobham in her own right. Their son Edward Brooke, 6th Baron Cobham succeeded, but his younger brother, Reginald Brooke, inherited and settled at Aspall in Suffolk. Robert Brooke the alderman was a grandson of Reginald Brooke of Aspall, and in his will names all his brothers and sisters, the sons and daughters of Reginald's son Edward Brooke of Aspall, who heads the descent shown in the 1612 Visitation of Suffolk.

== Education and first marriage ==
Robert Brooke, son of the alderman, was admitted at the newly founded Emmanuel College, Cambridge, a crucible of the Nonconformist movement, on 13 March 1588. He was admitted at Gray's Inn on 9 February 1592/93. He first married in October 1597 to Joan, daughter of Sir Humphrey Weld, Sheriff of London in 1599–1600, a leading City Grocer. Apparently in anticipation of this union, in August 1597 Alderman Brooke purchased the estate of Cockfield Hall and associated manors of Yoxford, Blythburgh, Walberswick, Westwood, Westleton, etc., from Arthur Hopton (died 1607), son of Sir Owen Hopton (died 1595). Sir Arthur stated that he sold them to cover his father's debts.

In his will dated 18 December 1598 the alderman wrote, "I have already fullie advaunced my eldest sonne Roberte Brooke by my landes and mannors purchased of Maister Arthur Hopton Esquier, lyeng and being in the County of Suffolck." Brooke was at once required to satisfy the terms of a lease on the estate, and faced a charge brought against him by Arthur Hopton for fraudulent interlineation of the conveyance to include Blythburgh Priory manor, and Blythburgh rectory, not intended to be conveyed. In the subsequent unpleasantness Hopton was for a while imprisoned by Brooke: the final decree, while reserving those premises to Sir Arthur, was costly to him, and led to a commission of inquiry at the Blythburgh White Hart. The alderman died in 1601, still having firm connections with the city. In 1608-1609 Joan's father was Lord Mayor of London, and he died in 1610: her brother John Weld, gent., in 1610 acquired the manor of Arnolds in Edmonton, Middlesex, and invested as a charter Council Assistant in the Newfoundland Company.

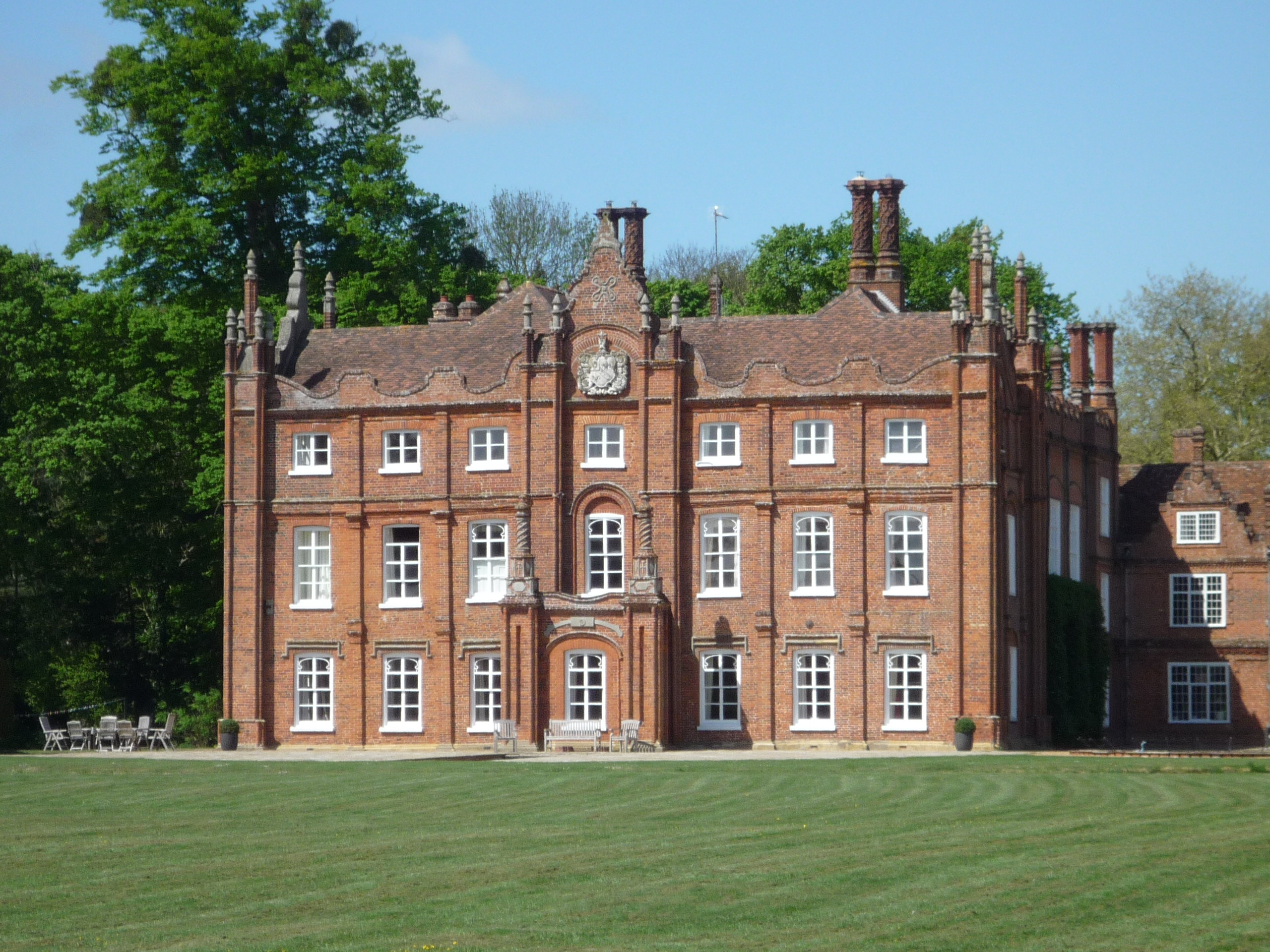
Cockfield Hall, Yoxford, where rebuilt by Robert Brooke, c. 1615 (but since modified), with a gable of the old hall of the Hoptons to the right

In 1614 Robert Brooke was Sheriff of Suffolk, and he was knighted in 1615 as of Blythburgh, Suffolk. His first marriage lasted for twenty years without issue, ending in Joan's death in 1618. She was buried in the Cockfield chapel at Yoxford church, where she has a brass memorial: it records that she was Sir Humfrey Weld's first-born daughter and was aged 38 at her death in May 1618. The seat at Blythburgh was presumably the manor house of Westwood, or Blythburgh Lodge, the former seat of the Hoptons between Blythburgh and Walberswick.

During the second decade of the century Sir Robert rebuilt Cockfield Hall at Yoxford anew. He preserved a part of the old Tudor brick mansion built by the elder Sir Arthur Hopton, Sir Owen's father, a century before, keeping three gabled bays as the north wing of the new hall. The new construction was a grand building, also of red brick with Jacobean architectural detailing of finials externally: some surviving early 17th century details include an oak staircase with turned balusters and pierced finials, painted panelling, carved stone fireplaces, and a drawing room with a very fine ornamental plaster ceiling. These details lie at the core of the present hall, which was considerably modified during the 19th century (including the addition of the third storey).

== Second marriage ==
Sir Robert remarried in c 1620 to Elizabeth Brooke (born 1601), daughter of Thomas Colepeper (died 1613) of Great Wigsell in Salehurst, East Sussex. Elizabeth was a niece of Sir Humphrey Weld's widow, Mary Slaney, and a granddaughter of citizen and Skinner Sir Stephen Slaney, Lord Mayor of London 1595–1596, who died in 1608. According to a contemporary account, Robert and Elizabeth spent the first two years of their marriage as boarders in the house of Lady Weld. Sir Robert then purchased a residence at Abbots Langley in Hertfordshire, so that she could live within a reasonable distance of her friends in London: they continued there together for some years before moving more permanently into Cockfield Hall. The house at Langley was sold in July 1637. Sir Robert had been a justice of the peace continuously from 1614 to July 1637, and after a brief interruption resumed in November 1637 until at least 1641.

By a decree of 1623, following a bankruptcy suit begun in 1621, it appears that Brooke, who often had cause to travel to London, acquired a substantial house in St Stephen Walbrook in settlement of a debt owing to him. This was near to the site of his father's former mansion in St Mary Woolchurch Haw, and the bankrupt, Lawrence Grene, was a former servant and legatee of Brooke's father, and witness to the alderman's two codicils. John Brooke, Sir Robert's brother, to whom the refusal of the unexpired term of their father's London mansion was bequeathed, was also concerned in this affair. In 1624, Sir Robert was elected Member of Parliament for Dunwich in the Happy Parliament and was re-elected in 1625 for the Useless Parliament. Elected MP for Dunwich again in 1628, he sat until 1629 when King Charles began to rule without parliament for eleven years. In this period his commissions were principally for the collection of subsidies and obligatory loan. Elizabeth Brooke was the full sister of John Colepeper, 1st Baron Colepeper, who became a leading royalist politician during the 1640s.

== Walberswick ==
Through the 16th and early 17th centuries the town of Walberswick suffered from the decline of its fishing industry ("Fyshar-Fare") and the loss of its tithes. The Hoptons sought to support it by challenging the monopoly of dues raised by the port of Dunwich and encouraging shipping up to Walberswick. In 1584, Owen Hopton gained the town's agreement to a lading rate at the wharf of 2d per load on butter, cheese, corn and bacon, etc. to support Walberswick church.

Under the regime of Robert Brooke, however, the lordship adopted a less benign position towards the town.

Around 1612, he seized the common, consisting of about 1400 acres, and also the Fen called Pawlesfen. By 1628 it was represented that some 80 of the townsfolk, mainly seafarers, were so poor that they were near to starving, and a committee of magistrates imposed a rate in 13 parishes of Blything Hundred upon several private persons to raise relief to help them. In January 1629, a committee including Sir Robert Brooke confirmed the rate and demanded its payment with arrearages, with right of appeal, but on pain of imprisonment for refusal.

In 1632, however, Brooke seized the quay: in 1642 the people of Walberswick brought the matter to trial under Judge Littleton, and recovered the Common and the Quay. But their peaceful enjoyment of it lasted less than two years, "great troubles arising by Means of Thomas Palmer, Sir Robert's great Farmer, feeding not only the Uplands with his Sheep, but by putting them also into East-Marsh, which the Townsmen having fenced with Posts, and Rails, and scoured the Dikes, the first were cut down and broke to pieces, and the latter filled up with the Manure thrown out before, supposed to be done, chiefly, by means of the said Palmer.

Also, "Sir Robert set up a boarded House for Men, and Dogs, near Pauls-Fenn, to keep out and drive away any Cattle belonging to the Town of Walberswick; when one of the Keepers came into the said Town, and quarrelling with the Townsmen, a lamentable Fray ensued, in which four Men lost their Lives, which gave occasion for calling the Fenn, afterwards, Bloody-Marsh." "And thus the Commons and Marshes were repossessed by Sir Robert as long as he lived."

== Legacy ==
Dame Elizabeth Brooke was a devoutly Christian person and left a great number of religious writings in manuscript. These included a Body of Divinity, in a large quarto bearing date 1631. She lived at Yoxford in religious contemplation and discourse for many years, experiencing both prosperity and also affliction, not least the loss of almost all of her children. She was also deeply affected by the death of King Charles I. William Dowsing the iconoclast gave his associate Francis Jessup charge of visiting the churches of Bungay, Blythburgh and Yoxford, but he made Sir Robert Brooke responsible for levelling the chancel steps at Bramfield. In 1645 Brooke was created an Elder of the Halesworth Congregational classis (one of the fourteen precincts or divisional committees organized for Suffolk), representing the Blything Hundred with Dunwich and Southwold, together with his son John Brooke, Esq., Sir John Rous of Henham, Robert Brewster and Francis Brewster (of Wrentham) and William Hevingham, Esquiers.

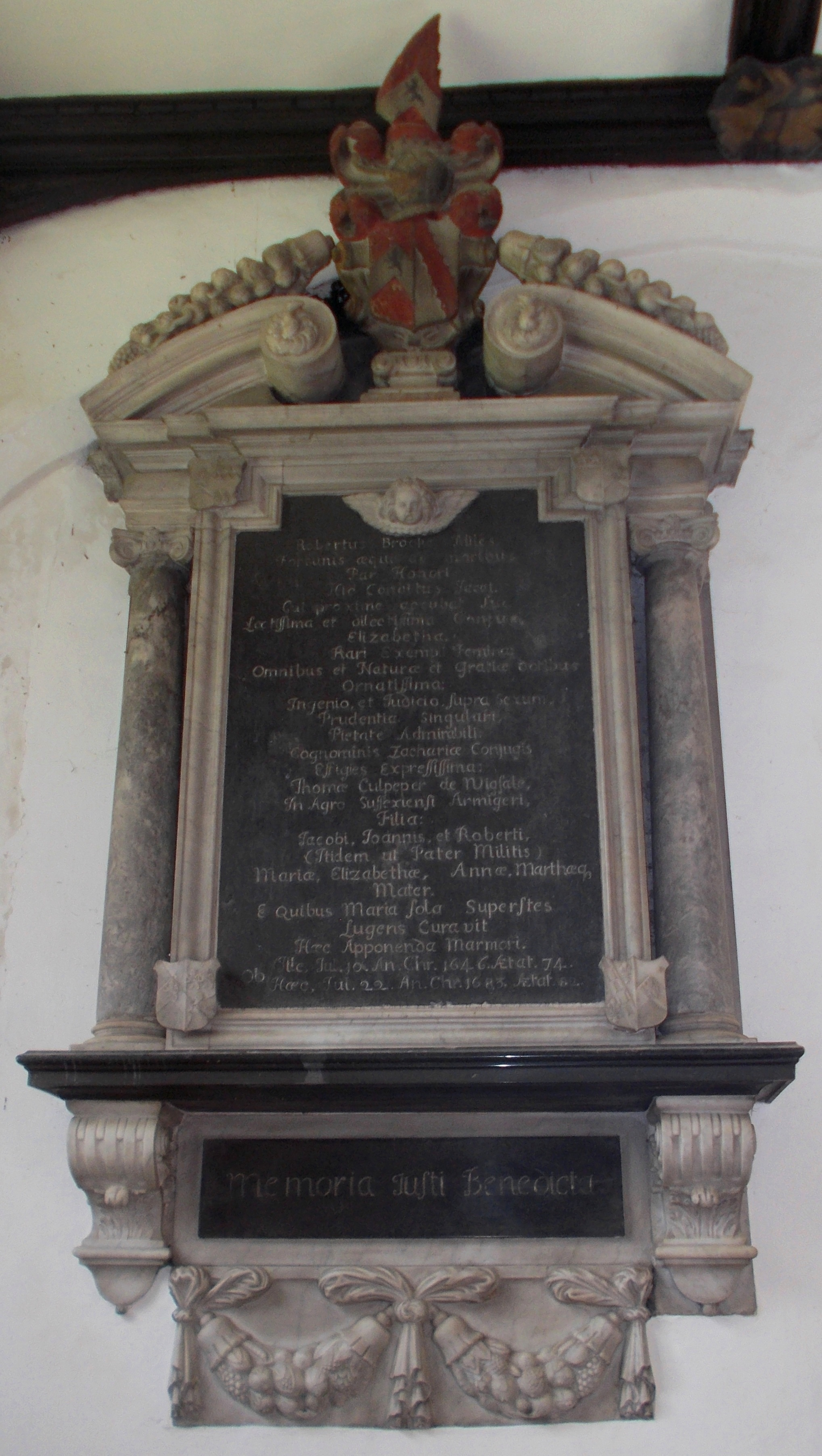
The Brooke monument at Yoxford, 1683

Sir Robert died in 1646 at the age of 74 and was buried at Yoxford, as from his seat of Cockfield Hall. He was succeeded by his son John Broke who, however, died in 1652. Dame Elizabeth Brooke lived at Cockfield Hall until her death in July 1683 and was buried at Yoxford church. Her funeral oration by minister Nathaniel Parkhurst was published in the following year, together with a Life and Death of Dame Elizabeth Brooke (a eulogy of her virtuous Christian life and character), and with the full text of another of her religious writings, her "Observations, Experiences and Rules for Christian Practice." Dame Elizabeth shares a large mural monument in the Cockfield chapel at Yoxford church with her late husband, though 37 years separate the dates of their deaths. This was erected by Mary Brooke at the time of her mother's death.

== Monument ==
The monument has a white marble surround with a broken segmental pediment with rolled terminals and with festoons or swags over, surmounted by a free-carved and painted shield and crest. The entablature projects over a pair of free Ionian columns, which rest below on a black marble corbel-table supported beneath by white grooved and rolled foliate consoles. Between the columns the inscription appears on a large black marble tablet framed by white marble moulding with an applied cherub's face with wings at the top, and a small heraldic shield indented at each corner. Beneath the corbel-table, between the consoles is inset a black marble stone inscribed "Memoria justi benedicta", and below this is inset a pair of fruit-cluster festoons suspended from hanging linen swags, carved in high relief. The main inscription, in a neat cursive script in Latin, remembers Sir Robert, follows with a eulogy for Dame Elizabeth, and mentions her parentage and her children, "e quibus Maria sola superstes lugens curavit hac apponenda marmori". The monument evidently belongs to the same moment as the funeral oration and Parkhurst's Life of Dame Elizabeth.

== Children ==
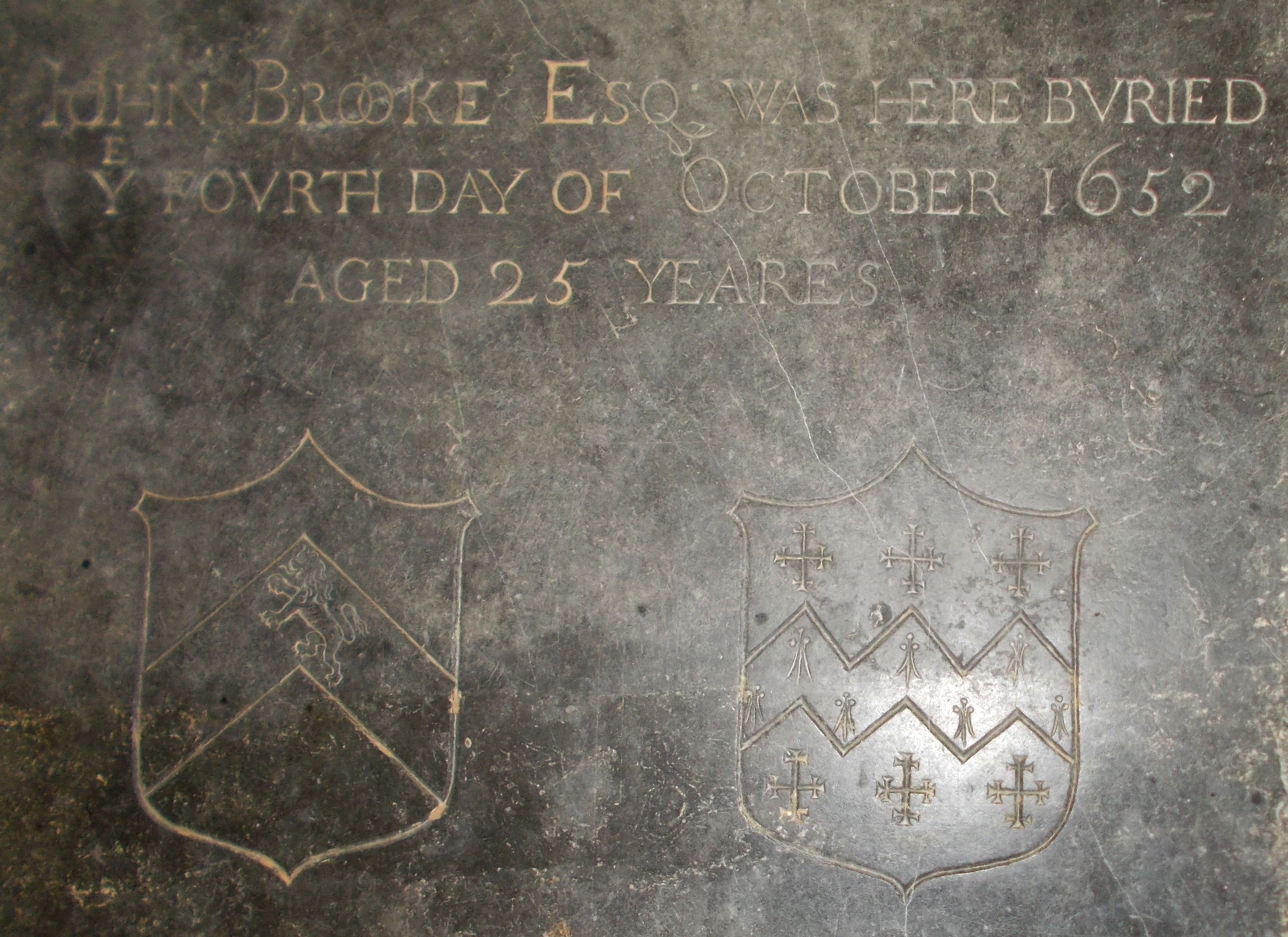
Memorial inscription for John Brooke, 1652, with Brooke and Barnardiston arms

Sir Robert and Dame Elizabeth Brooke had three sons and four daughters:

- James Brooke (died in infancy)
- John Brooke, the heir, born c. 1626, married Jane Barnardiston, daughter of Sir Nathaniel Barnardiston (1588-1653) of Kedington and his wife Jane (daughter of Sir Stephen Soame). By this marriage the manor of Blythburgh was settled in jointure upon Jane, and it was as of Westwood Lodge that John made his nuncupative will, dying aged 26 in October 1652. His widow Jane, his universal legatee and administratrix, remarried to Sir William Blois, who was first married to John's sister Martha Brooke.
- (Sir) Robert Brooke, born c. 1637, of Cockfield Hall, was MP for Aldeburgh. In 1659 he married Anne Margarett Mildmay, daughter of Sir Henry Mildmay of Wanstead, Essex. He died while bathing in the river Rhône at Avignon, France, in 1669.
- Mary Brooke, who did not marry, lived at Cockfield Hall until her death in 1693.
- Elizabeth Brooke, born c. 1622, married Thomas Bacon (1620-1697) of Friston, Suffolk, and was the mother of Nathaniel Bacon, the Virginian colonist who led Bacon's Rebellion. She died in 1647/48 aged about 25.
- Martha Brooke, born c. 1628, married Sir William Blois (the younger), by whom she had both sons and daughters. Their surviving son and heir, (Sir) Charles Blois, became sole master of Cockfield Hall in 1693 on the death of Mary Brooke. His mother Martha died in 1657 aged about 29, whereupon Sir William Blois remarried to Jane Barnardiston, relict of Martha's brother John Brooke. So Jane, who became Jane Brooke and then Dame Jane Blois, was the stepmother of Sir Charles.
- Anne Brooke (died in childhood).

Parliament of England
Preceded by Clement Coke; Thomas Bedingfield	Member of Parliament for Dunwich; 1624–1626; With: Sir John Rous	Succeeded by Sir John Rous; Thomas Bedingfield
Preceded by Sir John Rous; Thomas Bedingfield	Member of Parliament for Dunwich; 1628–1629; With: Francis Winterton	Parliament suspended until 1640
