= Thomas Long (fl.1407–1437) =

English Member of Parliament

Thomas Long (fl.1407–1437), was an English Member of Parliament (MP).

He was a Member of the Parliament of England for Rye in 1407, 1425, 1435 and 1437. He was Mayor of Rye c. April 1410, August 1410–11, 1421–2, and 1435–6.
