= Edward Henden =

English Member of Parliament

Edward Henden (March 1567 – 1644), of Gray's Inn and Biddenden Place, Kent; later of Serjeants' Inn, Fleet Street, London, was an English Member of Parliament.

He was a Member (MP) of the Parliament of England for Rye in 1614.
