= Herbert Barrett Curteis =

English Whig politician

Herbert Barrett Curteis (19 June 1793 – 13 December 1847) was an English Whig politician.

== Life ==
He was born on 19 June 1793 the eldest son of Edward Jeremiah Curteis (MP for Sussex in 1820) and his wife Mary Barrett, daughter of Rev Stephen Barrett of Kildwick in Yorkshire. He was educated at Westminster College then studied at Christ's College, Oxford.

He sat in the House of Commons of the United Kingdom for 13 years between 1830 and 1837. He was Member of Parliament (MP) for Sussex from 1830 to 1832, for East Sussex, and for Rye, Sussex, from 1841 until his death in 1847.

Curteis was educated at Westminster School and Christ Church, Oxford, where he matriculated in 1812, and graduated B.A. in 1815.

He died on 13 December 1847 and is buried in Wartling, Sussex with a tomb sculpted by Thomas Gaffin.

== Family ==
In 1821 he married Sarah Mascall daughter and heir of Robert Mascall, and through her inherited the estate of Peasmarsh in Sussex after her death in 1825. They had one son, born in 1823. A daughter, Charlotte Ellen Curteis died in 1861 and is buried in Wartling with a monument by Thomas Denman.

Parliament of the United Kingdom
Preceded by Thomas Gybbon Monypenny	Member of Parliament for Rye; 1841–1847	Succeeded by Herbert Mascall Curteis
