= Robert Wymond =

English Member of Parliament

Robert Wymond (by 1508–1549), of Rye, Sussex and Goudhurst, Kent, was an English Member of Parliament (MP). He was a Member of the Parliament of England for Rye in 1545.
