= Alexander Welles =

English Member of Parliament

Alexander Welles (by 1514–58), of Rye, Sussex, was an English Member of Parliament (MP). He was a Member of the Parliament of England for Rye in 1545 and 1547. He was Mayor of Rye 1557–8.
