= Thomas Piers =

English Member of Parliament

Thomas Piers (born before 1412 - died between 1429 and 1441) of Rye, Sussex, was an English Member of Parliament (MP).

He was a Member of the Parliament of England for Rye in May 1421. He was Mayor of Rye 1424–5, and ?1428-9.
