= John Sackville (died 1661) =

English gentleman and landowner

Sir John Sackville (c. 1591–1661) was an English gentleman and landowner who sat in the House of Commons in 1625 and 1626.

Sackville was the son of John Sackville of Selscomb, Sussex. He matriculated at St John's College, Oxford on 21 October 1608 aged 17. In 1625, he was elected member of parliament for Rye. He was re-elected MP for Rye in 1626. He was knighted on 16 April 1628.

One of his sons was Edward Sackville, one of King James II's Major Generals during the Glorious Revolution.

Parliament of England
Preceded by Thomas Conway; John Angel	Member of Parliament for Rye; 1625–1626; With: Thomas Fotherby	Succeeded by Richard Tufton; Thomas Fotherby
