= John Angell (1592–1670) =

English Member of Parliament

John Angell (c. 1592-1670), of Old Fish Street, Billingsgate, London and Crowhurst, Surrey, was an English Member of Parliament.

He was a Member (MP) of the Parliament of England for Rye in 1621 and 1624.

He had a wife named Elizabeth Angell (c. 1589-1671) who worked as a seamstress. Angell also had 2 children.
