= Thomas Davis Lamb =

English Member of Parliament

Thomas Davis Lamb (1775-1818), of Mountsfield Lodge, Rye, Sussex, was an English Member of Parliament.

He was a Member (MP) of the Parliament of the United Kingdom for Rye 1802 - March 1806. He was Mayor of Rye 1803-4, 1809-10, and 1816-17.
