= Thomas Conway (MP) =

English Member of Parliament

Thomas Conway (1597 – c. 1631), of Drury Lane, Middlesex, was an English Member of Parliament. He was a Member (MP) of the Parliament of England for Rye 28 February 1624.
