= Thomas Cheseman =

16th-century English politician

Thomas Cheseman or Baker (c. 1488–1536 or later) was an English politician who was a member of parliament (MP) of the Parliament of England for Rye in 1523.
