= Thomas Basseden =

English Member of Parliament

Thomas Basseden (by 1462–1524 or later), of Rye, Sussex, was an English Member of Parliament (MP).

He was a Member of the Parliament of England for Rye in 1523. He was Mayor of Rye 1522–23.
