= Thomas Watson (died before 1621) =

English Member of Parliament

Thomas Watson (died 1621 buried St Margaret's, Halstead Kent), of Westminster and Halstead Court, Halstead, Kent; formerly of Monkwell Street, London, was an English Member of Parliament. He was a Member (MP) of the Parliament of England for Rye in 1614.
