= Clement Cobbe =

English Member of Parliament

Clement Cobb (born after 1527 - died ?1574), of Rye, Sussex, was an English Member of Parliament.

He was a Member (MP) of the Parliament of England for Rye in 1572. He was Mayor of Rye 1566–7.
