= Mayor of Rye =

The following were mayors of Rye, East Sussex, England:

- August 1380 – 1382: Stephen Elyot
- Aug. 1390–1, 1393–4, 1395-7: John Baddyng
- August ?1387-8, 1389–90, 1392-3: Laurence Lunceford
- August 1397–9, 1401-3: William atte Vawte
- August 1404-5: John Macop
- Aug. 1405–6, 1407–10; jurat 1413-14: William Long
- 19 May 1409, August 1415–17, and 1426-7: Robert Onewyn
- c. April 1410, August 1410–11, 1421–2, and 1435-6: Thomas Long
- 1424-5, and ?1428-9: Thomas Piers.
- August 1411–12 and approximately 1418–21: John Shelley
- 1412-1415: John Langeport
- 1509–11, 1516–17, 1519–20, July–August 1529 and 1531–2: Nicholas Sutton
- 1514-16: Robert Mede
- 1522-23: Thomas Basseden
- 1529–30, 1533–4, 1536-7: Richard Inglet.
- 1538-40, and 1548-9: Thomas Birchet.
- 1549-50: Thomas Fletcher
- George Reynolds: 1551–3, 1556–7, 1564–6.
- 1557-8: Alexander Welles
- 1560-1 and 1569-70: John Bredes
- 1561-2: Robert Marche
- 1566-7: Clement Cobbe.
- 1567-8, 1570–1, 1571–2, 1573-4: John Donning
- 1572-3, 1588–9, 1589-90: Henry Gaymer.
- 1583-4, 1584–5, 1590–1, 1591-2: Robert Carpenter
- 1595-7, 1599–1601, 1605-?: Thomas Hamon
- 1803-4, 1809–10, and 1816-17: Thomas Davis Lamb
