= Richard Posterf =

English Member of Parliament

Richard Posterf (died c. 1449), of Rye, East Sussex, was an English Member of Parliament (MP).

He was a Member of the Parliament of England for Rye in 1417.
