= Nicholas Sutton (MP) =

English Member of Parliament

Nicholas Sutton (by 1465-1532/33), of Rye, Sussex, was an English Member of Parliament.

He was a Member (MP) of the Parliament of England for Rye in 1497, 1510, 1512, 1515 and 1529. He was Mayor of Rye 1509–11, 1516–17, 1519–20, July–August 1529 and 1531–2.
