= Richard Tichebourne =

English Member of Parliament

Richard Tichebourne (born before 1390 - died between 1406 and 1411), was an English Member of Parliament (MP). He was a Member of the Parliament of England for Rye in January 1397.
