= Richard Champernowne =

Member of the Parliament of England

Richard Champernowne (or Champernown, c.1558 Modbury, Devon - 1622) was an MP in Cornwall, representing West Looe constituency. He was elected in the 1586 English general election but did not return to Parliament after the next election.

Parliament of the United Kingdom
Preceded by Thomas Lancaster; Geoffrey Gates	Member of Parliament for West Looe; 1586-1587; With: John Hammond	Succeeded by Matthew Patteson; Robert Saunderson
