= Edward Barrett Curteis =

English politician

Edward Barrett Curteis was an English Whig politician.

He sat in the House of Commons of the United Kingdom for 5 years between 1832 and 1837. He was Member of Parliament (MP) for Rye, Sussex.

Parliament of the United Kingdom
Preceded by Thomas Pemberton Leigh, 1st Baron Kingsdown; De Lacy Evans	Member of Parliament for Rye; 1832–1837	Succeeded by Thomas Gybbon Monypenny
