= Thomas Gybbon Monypenny =

Thomas Gybbon Monypenny was an English Conservative politician.

He sat in the House of Commons of the United Kingdom for 4 years between 1837 and 1841, the Member of Parliament (MP) for Rye, Sussex. He was Lieutenant Colonel of the West Kent Light Infantry from 1852 until his death. He was also a Deputy Lieutenant for Kent; and a magistrate for Kent and Sussex.

Parliament of the United Kingdom
Preceded by Edward Barrett Curteis	Member of Parliament for Rye; 1837–1841	Succeeded by Herbert Barrett Curteis
