= Richard Tufton (MP, died 1631) =

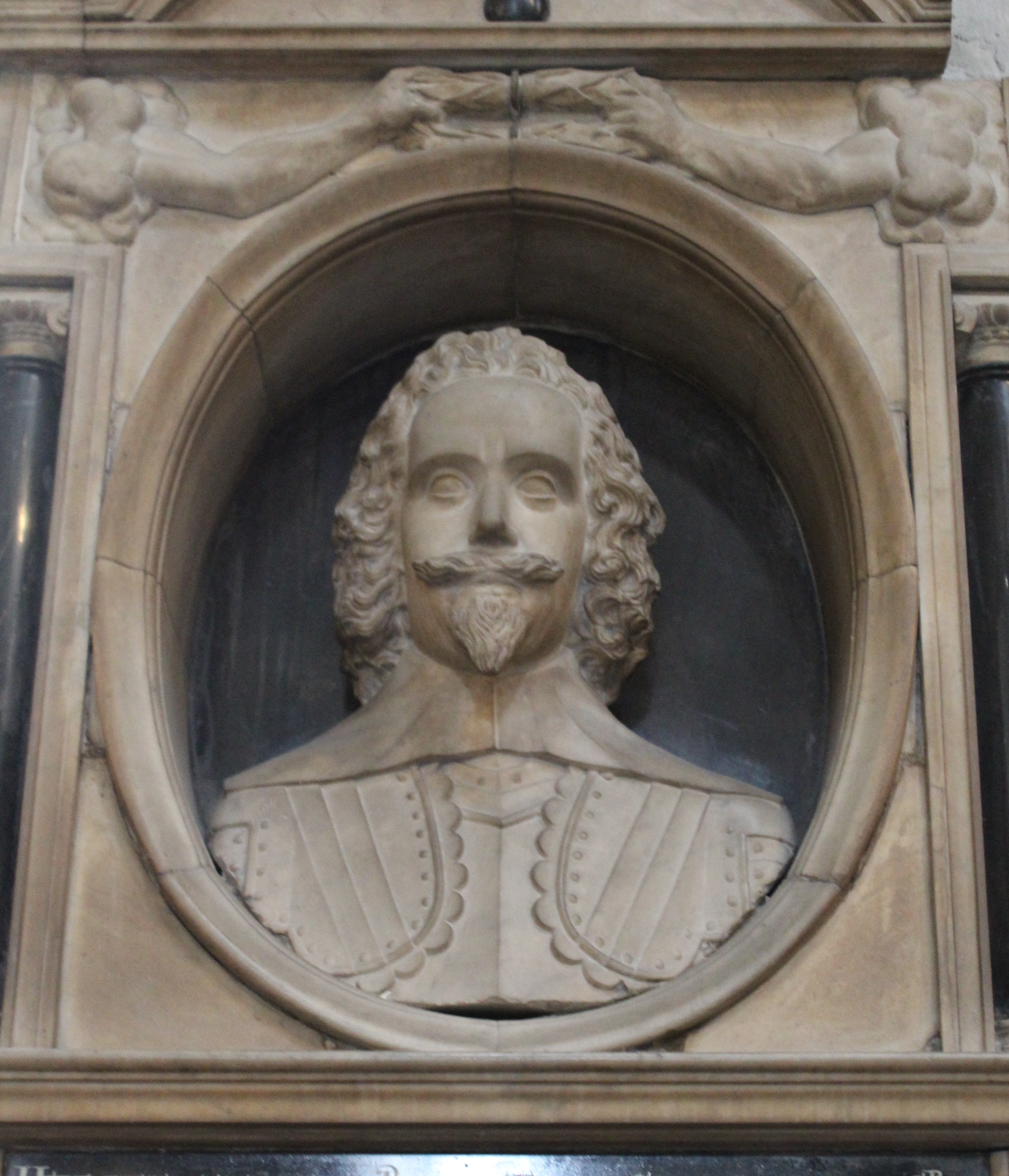
Tufton memorial, Westminster Abbey

Richard Tufton (1585 – 4 October 1631) was an English lawyer and politician who sat in the House of Commons at various times between 1614 and 1629.

Tufton was of Kent. He matriculated at University College, Oxford on 30 June 1598, aged 13. He was called to the bar at Gray's Inn in 1609. In 1614, he was elected member of parliament for Grantham. He was elected MP for Rye in 1628 and sat until 1629 when King Charles decided to rule without parliament for eleven years. He built Tufton Street in Westminster. Tufton is buried in Westminster Abbey, his grave marked by a memorial in white and black marble with a portrait bust below figures of Mars and Mercury.

Parliament of England
Preceded by Sir George Manners; Sir Thomas Horsman	Member of Parliament for Grantham; 1614; With: Sir George Reynell	Succeeded by Sir William Airmine; Sir Clement Cotterell
Preceded by Sir John Sackville; Thomas Fotherley	Member of Parliament for Rye; 1628–1629; With: Thomas Fotherley	Parliament suspended until 1640
