= Godman Irvine =

British politician (1909–1992)

The Right Honourable Sir Godman Irvine PC
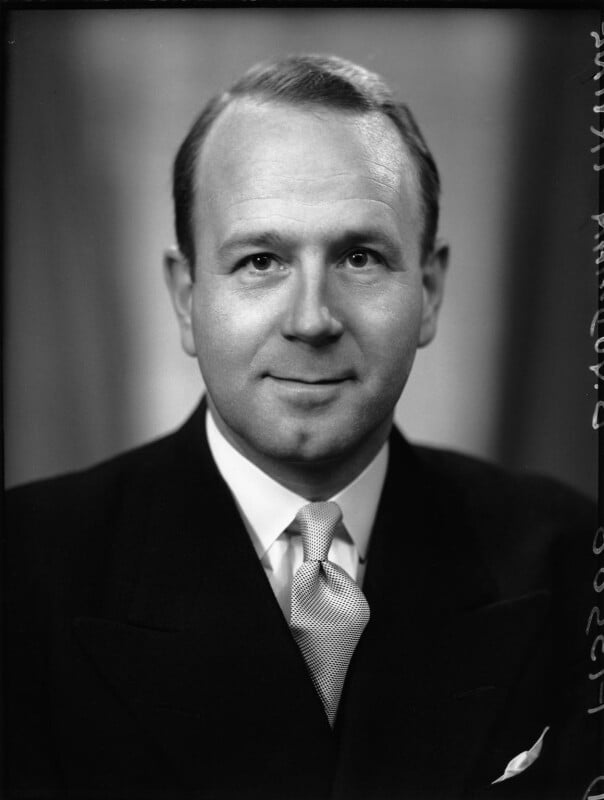
- Irvine in 1951

Member of Parliament for Rye
- In office 1955–1983
- Preceded by: Constituency created
- Succeeded by: Constituency abolished

Deputy Speaker of the House of Commons Second Deputy Chairman of Ways and Means
- In office 1976–1979
- Preceded by: Myer Galpern
- Succeeded by: Richard Crawshaw

Personal details
- Born: Bryant Godman Irvine; 25 July 1909
- Died: 3 May 1992 (aged 82)
- Party: Conservative
- Spouse: Valborg Cecilie (m. 1945; died 1990)

Sir Bryant Godman Irvine, PC (25 July 1909 – 3 May 1992) was a Canadian-born British Conservative politician.

== Early life ==
Irvine was born to William Henry and Ada Mary Irvine and raised in Toronto. He was educated at Upper Canada College in Toronto and then moved to Britain to attend St Paul's School and Magdalen College, Oxford, where he was secretary of the Oxford Union. He became a barrister, called to the bar by Inner Temple in 1932, and was a farmer. During World War II Irvine was a Lieutenant Commander in the Royal Naval Volunteer Reserve.

== Political career ==
Irvine contested Wood Green in 1951. He was Member of Parliament for Rye from 1955 to 1983. He was secretary of the 1922 Committee 1965–66, and from 1976 to 1982 he served as a Deputy Speaker of the House of Commons under George Thomas. He was appointed a privy counsellor in the 1982 Birthday Honours.

In the 1986 New Year Honours, Irvine was knighted for political service.

== Family ==
Irvine was married to Valborg Cecilie from 1945 until her death in 1990.

Parliament of the United Kingdom
New constituency	Member of Parliament for Rye; 1955 – 1983	Constituency abolished (after: Hastings and Rye)
