= John Langeport =

English Member of Parliament

John Langeport (fl. 1397-1415), of Rye, Sussex, was an English Member of Parliament (MP). He was a Member of the Parliament of England for Rye in January 1397. From 1412 to 1415, he was Mayor of Rye.
