= 1847 Rye by-election =

UK parliamentary by-election

The 1847 Rye by-election was held on 23 December 1847 at the town hall, Rye. It was called after the death of the incumbent Herbert Barrett Curteis (Whig). His son Herbert Mascall Curteis, also a Whig, was elected unopposed.
