= Thomas Pemberton Leigh, 1st Baron Kingsdown =

British barrister, judge and politician

The Right Honourable The Lord Kingsdown QC PC
- Lord Kingsdown.

Personal details
- Born: 11 February 1793 London, England
- Died: 7 October 1867 (aged 74) Torry Hill, near Sittingbourne, Kent
- Party: Tory

Thomas Pemberton Leigh, 1st Baron Kingsdown PC, QC (11 February 1793 – 7 October 1867), was a British barrister, judge and politician. Originally a successful equity lawyer, he then entered politics and sat as an MP from 1831 to 1832 and from 1835 to 1843. From 1841 to 1843 he was attorney-general for the Duchy of Cornwall. However, he is best remembered for his role on the judicial committee of the Privy Council, of which he was a member for nearly twenty years. Having turned down the post of Lord High Chancellor of Great Britain in 1858, he was the same year elevated to the peerage as Baron Kingsdown. He died unmarried in October 1867, aged 74.

== Background ==
Born Thomas Pemberton, in London, Leigh was the eldest son of Thomas Pemberton, a chancery barrister, by Margaret Leigh, eldest daughter and co-heir of Edward Leigh, of Bispham Hall, Lancashire. He was the uncle of Sir Edward Leigh Pemberton.

== Legal, judicial and political career ==
Leigh was called to the Bar, Lincoln's Inn, in 1816, and at once acquired a lucrative equity practice. In 1829 he was made a King's Counsel. He sat in Parliament for Rye from 1831 to 1832 and for Ripon from 1835 to 1843. He seldom took part in parliamentary debates, although in 1838 in the case of Stockdale v. Hansard he took a considerable part in upholding the privileges of Parliament. In 1841, he accepted the post of attorney-general for the Duchy of Cornwall. In 1842 a relative on his mother's side, Sir Robert Holt Leigh, 1st Baronet, left him a life interest in his Wigan estates, amounting to some £15,000 a year; he then assumed the additional surname of Leigh. Having accepted the chancellorship of the Duchy of Cornwall and a privy councillorship in 1843, he became a member of the judicial committee of the Privy Council, and for nearly twenty years devoted his energies and talents to the work of that body.

Pemberton Leigh's judgments, more particularly in prize cases, of which he took especial charge, are remarkable not only for legal precision and accuracy, but for their form and expression. Between 1854 and 1858 he acted as the law officer representing the Duchy of Cornwall in the Cornish Foreshore Case, a case of arbitration between the Crown and the Duchy of Cornwall. Officers of the Duchy successfully argued that the Duchy enjoyed many of the rights and prerogatives of a County Palatine and that although the Duke of Cornwall was not granted royal jurisdiction, was considered to be quasi-sovereign within his Duchy of Cornwall. The arbitration, as instructed by the Crown, was based on legal argument and documentation which led to the Cornwall Submarine Mines Act 1858.

In 1858, on the formation of Lord Derby's second administration, he was offered the office of Lord Chancellor, but declined. He was raised to the peerage as Baron Kingsdown, of Kingsdown in the County of Kent, the same year. In 1861 he was instrumental in the passing of the Wills Act 1861 (later known as Lord Kingsdown's Act), by which a will made out of the United Kingdom by a British subject is, as far as regards personal estate, good if made according to the forms required by the law of the place where it was made, or by the law of the testator's domicil at the time of making it, or by the law of the place of his domicil of origin. Primarily this had ramifications for members of the British armed forces (see also Legal history of wills).

== Personal life ==
Lord Kingsdown funded the Kingsdown Church. A small booklet from the Redundant Churches Fund tells us that the population in 1865 was only 96 so a benefactor was essential. He supported the building of a new church on the site of the tumbledown mediaeval church that stood where today's nave stands. The church is a rare example of the work of Edward Welby Pugin, a noted ecclesiastical architect in Britain. Lord Kingsdown died at his seat, Torry Hill, near Sittingbourne, Kent, on 7 October 1867, aged 74. He never married, and his title died with him. Torry Hill stayed in the family, later known as the Leigh-Pembertons. Torry Hill was rebuilt to a Georgian design in the 1960s and only a Victorian gate-house remains on the estate. Lord Kingsdown's nephew Sir Edward Leigh Pemberton was the ancestor of Robin Leigh-Pemberton, who was created a life peer as Baron Kingsdown in 1993.

He wrote Recollections of Life at the Bar and in Parliament (privately printed for friends, 1868); The Times (8 October 1867).

== See also ==
- Kingsdown, Swale
- Cornish Foreshore Case
- Barnhart v Greenshields (1853) 14 ER 204, on equitable interests of leases binding purchasers

Parliament of the United Kingdom
Preceded by Hugh Duncan Baillie; Francis Robert Bonham	Member of Parliament for Rye; 1831 – 1832; With: De Lacy Evans	Succeeded by Edward Barrett Curteis
Preceded by Joshua Crompton; Thomas Staveley	Member of Parliament for Ripon; 1835 – 1843; With: Sir Charles Dalbiac 1835–1837; Sir Edward Sugden 1837–1841; Sir George Cockburn, Bt 1841–1845	Succeeded by Thomas Cusack-Smith; Sir George Cockburn, Bt
Peerage of the United Kingdom
New creation	Baron Kingsdown; 1858–1867	Extinct
