= William Ormed =

English Member of Parliament

William Ormed (fl. 1395), was an English Member of Parliament (MP). He was a Member of the Parliament of England for Rye in 1395. Nothing further is recorded of him.
