= William Thirlwall =

English Member of Parliament

William Thirlwall (before 1417 - 1431 or after), was an English Member of Parliament (MP).

He was a Member of the Parliament of England for Hythe in December 1421, 1422, 1423, 1425, 1427, 1429 and 1431. He married in 1417 and was last recorded in 1431.
