= John Donning =

English Member of Parliament

John Donning (c. 1530 – 1578 or after), of Chichester and Rye, Sussex, was an English Member of Parliament. He was a Member (MP) of the Parliament of England for Rye in 1571. He was Mayor of Rye 1567–8, 1570–1, 1571–2, and 1573–4. The last recorded mention of him is in 1578.
