= John Roberd =

English Member of Parliament

John Roberd (fl. 1402) of Rye, East Sussex, was an English merchant and Member of Parliament (MP).

He was a Member of the Parliament of England for Rye in 1402.
