= Robert Mede =

English Member of Parliament

Robert Mede or Robert a Mede (by 1475 – c. 1516), of Rye, Sussex, was an English Member of Parliament (MP).

He was a Member of the Parliament of England for Rye in 1512 and 1515. He was Mayor of Rye 1514–16. He had two sons, including William Mede, also an MP for Rye.
