= Geoffrey Gates (British MP) =

Member of the Parliament of England

Geoffrey Gates (c.1550 Bury St Edmunds, Suffolk - ?) was a Puritan MP for various Cornish constituencies. He represented St Mawes constituency, West Looe constituency and Camelford constituency. He was elected to St Mawes in the 1572 English general election, to West Looe in 1584 and to Camelford in 1586.

Gates also wrote a treatise called The Defence of Militarie Profession.

Parliament of England
Preceded by William Fleetwood; Israel Amice	Member of Parliament for St Mawes; 1572–1581; With: Rowland Hind	Succeeded by William Onslow; Christopher Southouse
Preceded by John Audley; William Hammond	Member of Parliament for West Looe; 1584–1585; With: Thomas Lancaster	Succeeded by John Hammond; Richard Champernowne
Preceded by Emmanuel Chamond; Richard Trefusis	Member of Parliament for Camelford; 1586–1587; With: Richard Trefusis	Succeeded by Arthur Gorges; Richard Trefusis
