= William Long (died c. 1426) =

William Long (died c.1426), of Rye, Sussex, was an English member of parliament.

He was a member (MP) of the Parliament of England for Rye in 1410, May 1413, November 1414, 1419 and 1420. He was the mayor of Rye August 1405-6 and 1407–10.
