= Robert Onewyn =

English Member of Parliament

Robert Onewyn also known as Taylor (died c. 1428), of Rye, East Sussex, was an English Member of Parliament (MP). He was a Member of the Parliament of England for Rye in May 1413, November 1414, 1419 and May 1421. He was acting Mayor of Rye 19 May 1409, August 1415–17, and 1426–7.
