= Baron Kingsdown =

Baron Kingsdown may refer to:

- Thomas Pemberton Leigh, 1st Baron Kingsdown (1793–1867), British politician.
- Robin Leigh-Pemberton, Baron Kingsdown (1927–2013), British lawyer and banker, kinsman of the above.
