= John Bertelot =

English Member of Parliament

John Bertelot (died c. 1405), of Rye, Sussex, was an English Member of Parliament (MP).

He was a Member of the Parliament of England for Rye in 1393.
