= John Shelley (MP) =

John Shelley (fl. 1410–1439), of Rye, Sussex and Sandwich, Kent, was an English Member of Parliament (MP).

He was a Member of the Parliament of England for Rye in 1410, 1417, December 1421, and 1422, and for Sandwich in 1426, 1429 and 1435. He was Mayor of Rye in August 1411–12 and c. 1418–21.
