= Stephen Slaney =

English merchant

Sir Stephen Slaney (1524–1608) was an English merchant, four times Master of the Worshipful Company of Skinners, and Alderman, Sheriff and Lord Mayor of London. He has been called "one of the most picturesque of the Elizabethan Merchant Adventurers".

== Career ==
Stephen Slaney was the son of John Slaney of Mitton (in Penkridge, in Staffordshire) and the grandson of Ralph Slaney of Yardley in Worcestershire. He is said to have been the younger brother of John Slaney of Shifnal, Shropshire, and also had brothers William (who died before 1598) and Henry (living 1598). He was married on 22 January 1559/60 at St Mildred, Poultry to Margaret, daughter of Jasper Pheasant (Fesaunt), magistrate, of Tottenham, Middlesex, and his wife Margaret, daughter of George Henyngham of Tottenham (died 1537), so establishing his kinship with puritan interests among the City's ruling group. Stephen embarked upon London mercantile life as a freeman and officer of the Worshipful Company of Skinners.

In April 1566 Stephen and the merchant Francis Barnham (died 1575) acted as feoffees for Sir Thomas Wentworth in the alienation, for Wentworth's uses, of the manors of Chatham, Rochester, Horsted and others in Kent. 1568 he assisted Wolstan Dixie in the purchase, for Dixie's heirs, from Sir Thomas Wentworth and his wife the manors of Staynton (held of the Crown in chief) and Awkborough (North Lincolnshire), and lands there, together with free fishery in the waters of the River Humber by fine in the Common Pleas: for this a pardon of alienation had to be obtained in March 1569. He became a substantial figure in the Company of Merchant Adventurers of London, and was among those named in Elizabeth's commission of 1572 to empower the sale, for the recovery of debts, of the ships and merchandize of the subjects of the Catholic King arrested since 1568/69. In around 1575 he was informed against for having imposed a usurious mortgage, and was fined £7,800, part of which was payable to the Queen. For that part, amounting to £3,900, he received a pardon through the intervention of influential associates.

Slaney engaged in Mediterranean trade as what was afterwards called a Turkey merchant, and it is said that on one occasion he was captured by the Turks and had to give up his entire fortune (or at least Norton in Chebsey, in Staffordshire) as a ransom. He served as Auditor to the City in 1576–1578 and again in 1581–1583. He first became master of his company (Skinners) in 1585. His first term as alderman was for Portsoken Ward, in 1584–1586, and he was chosen Sheriff of the City of London, with Henry Billingsley, for 1584–85. Anthony Mundy addressed to them, and to the Lord Mayor Thomas Pullyson, his address warning of traitors within. In 1585 the Merchant Adventurers appointed Slaney to a committee in 1585 to confer with Captain Christopher Carleill "upon a voyage intending to the uttermost parts of America". He then transferred to the Coleman Street Ward in 1586, and was again chosen master of his company in 1587. After being elected master a third time in 1591, he served as Lord Mayor of London for 1595–96.

== The Mayoralty, 1595–1596 ==
At the start of his mayoral term, a general overhaul of the forces for the defence of the realm was ordained. Some of the Lords of the Council were appointed to have dealings with the Mayor and Aldermen for the putting of the City's forces in order, their organization into bands to be led by men of judgement and experience, and (if necessary) for their augmentation. Out of the City's general forces, three thousand men were to be chosen to be prepared for defence of the counties of Kent and Sussex from the river Thames, and a fleet of barges was to be kept ready for their conveyance. His correspondence with the Privy Council in September 1595 contains interesting references to the playhouses in London. In December 1595 a survey was taken of all the poor householders in the wards and liberties of the City who were in need of present Relief, and the report was presented to Queen Elizabeth by the Mayor, which showed the number of householders to be 4,132.

In July 1596 a printed ballad was brought to him, complaining of the shortage of corn in the realm. As Slaney wrote to the Lord Treasurer, it contained "certain vain and presumptuous matters, bringing in the Queen, speaking with her people dialoguewise in very fond and undecent sort, and prescribing order for the remedying of this dearth". Although the information came from an official source, the poem was "done in that vain and indiscreet manner" so as to whip up discontent among the poor, and therefore Slaney summoned the printer and publisher, who falsely claimed to have a licence for it. The author was Thomas Deloney, "an idle fellow", who had also written a similarly disorderly pamphlet for the Silk-weavers, but the Mayor was unable to find or arrest him. Over the following months four more libellous pamphlets were found which were being dispersed seditiously in the City, and these he also forwarded to the Lord Treasurer. The City magistrates at that time were determined not to permit unworthy or disrespectful speeches against the monarch. Slaney's letter of August 1596 to the Merchant Taylors suggesting they forego their annual feast and apply the money to a charitable purpose received the reply that this had already been done.

Slaney transferred his aldermanry once more, this time to the Broad Street Ward from 1596 until his death in 1608. His fourth term as master of his company was in 1598. In that year Sir Stephen Slaney, his son Jasper Slaney, and kinsman John Slaney of London, appear as partners, and Humphrey Slaney, a merchant resident at Middelburg, as factor or dealer there for Jasper Slaney. They have been engaged in shipping corn and rye from Zeeland on behalf of Thomas Offley (jnr), citizen and leather seller of London, who brings a suit for detention, accusing John and Jasper of collusion against him. By the close of this hearing in 1598, which was found for the plaintiff, Humphrey Slaney has become Administrator of Jasper Slaney's affairs. Sir Stephen was subsequently President of the Bethlem and Bridewell in 1599–1600, President of Christ's Hospital 1602–08, and Surveyor-General of Hospitals 1604–08.

== Death and legacy ==
Stephen died on 27 December 1608, aged 84, and was buried in a vault beneath the church of St Swithin, London Stone, Walbrook Ward, where his memorial inscription "on a fair tomb in the east end of the north aisle" was recorded by Anthony Mundy. (The church was destroyed in the Great Fire of London, 1666, and rebuilt by Wren, but finally demolished in 1954.) His will (written in 1598) left £6 for 12 sermons in St Swithin's church, and was proved in 1609. As befitted a Lord Mayor, he made large charitable bequests, including £100 to the poor children of Christ's Hospital, 100 marks to freeing of prisoners from the Counters of Wood Street and the Poultry, £6.13s.04d to the poor of St Thomas' Hospital, and the same to St Bartholomew's Hospital and the Bridewell, £5 for poor prisoners in the King's Bench and the same to the Marshalsea, £10 to the poor of Coleman Street, £5 to the poor of Portsoken Ward and £5 to the poor of St Swithin's parish. The Skinners were to have 72 poor men's cloaks for distribution, and £15 to hold his funeral dinner.

The will also mentioned Chebsey (£10 to the poor), Stone (£10 to the poor), Penkridge (£40 to poor maidens' marriages), Stafford (£10 to the poor) and Lichfield (£20 to the poor), in Staffordshire. There were bequests to his daughters and sons in law. His widow was his executor, and his three sons-in-law his Overseers. The only John Slaney he mentioned was his brother Henry's son: John had children of his own, and a sister (Alice) with children, who was married to Mr Cotton, schoolmaster of Sevenoaks in Kent. John became Stephen's heir male, to whom he left his manor of Forshaw in Warwickshire (formerly settled on his son Stephen's marriage), and also the term of lease of the tenement and its appurtenances where Henry was yet living and was to remain. He gave also £66.13s.04d to be shared among all of Henry's children. Robert Slaney, the son of Stephen's late brother William, received £6.13s.04d. Slaney bore for arms, Gules, a bend between three martlets, or (1595): these appeared, together with those of Dame Margaret, in glass in a window of the church of St Swithin.

Dame Margaret Slaney's Charities

His widow Dame Margaret died in 1619 leaving a will of her own (written in 1612), making her sons-in-law Sir Samuel Lennard and Thomas Colepeper, and her "cosens" John and Humphrey Slaney her overseers. By her codicil of 1618, owing to the death of Thomas Colepeper, she augments the inheritance of her Colepeper grandchildren, and provides that her niece Katherine Fesaunt and granddaughter Elizabeth Colepeper shall be cared for by her daughter Mary Weld. She made very substantial charitable bequests. Among them was a gift of £40 to the Worshipful Company of Grocers, so that they should pay £3 a year to the poor of West Wickham in Kent, for their children to be apprenticed to useful trades. At the same time she also made the larger gift to that company, as trustees, of a fund of £2000 as a perpetual stock for the purchasing and re-uniting to the church of impropriated benefices and parsonages, the work to be audited annually at Christmas by the governors of Christ's Hospital. This led to the passage of an Act of Parliament in 1869. She was buried in the vault of St Swithin's church, and left £1200 (£1000, with £200 more added in the codicil) for the costs of her funerals, in which "noe offensive or superstitious ceremonies" were to be used.

== Family ==
Sir Stephen Slaney and Dame Margaret, née Pheasant (Fesaunt), had five sons and six daughters, who were named as follows in his memorial inscription at St Swithin's:

- Stephen Slaney, eldest son, of Norton, Staffordshire, married Catherine, daughter of Sir Walter Aston, MP, and predeceased his father. A settlement was made in August 1593 (34 Eliz. I). He was survived by his only daughter Anna, who married (Sir) William Litton of Knebworth, Hertfordshire.
- Jasper Slaney, matriculated Fellow Commoner from Christ's College, Cambridge, 1590/91. He died unmarried, c. 1598.
- Thomas Slaney, died unmarried
- Richard Slaney, died aged 2
- Timothy Slaney, died aged 2 months
- Maria Slaney, the firstborn, survived, married first to Richard Bradgate, Skinner (died 1589), and then to Sir Humphrey Weld, Lord Mayor of London. Dame Mary Weld died in 1623 and left an extensive will.
- Alicia Slaney (I), died
- Elizabeth Slaney married Samuel Lennard, MP.
- Alicia Slaney (II), died
- Anna Slaney, married Thomas Colepeper, MP, Esq. (died 1613), and died c. 1602 after having three children including Slaney, Elizabeth (who became Elizabeth Brooke), and Sir John Colepeper, 1st Baron Colepeper.
- Martha Slaney, died unmarried

John and Humphrey Slany

John and Humphrey Slany are evidently to be identified with those mentioned as "cosens" in the wills of Dame Margaret Slaney (1618) and her daughter Dame Mary Weld (1623), and are the brothers who appear in the parish registers of St Martin Pomary (Ironmonger Lane) between 1593 and 1648, and in the will of John Slany of Ironmonger Lane (1632), and of their brother Richard Slany (1620). Sir Humphrey Weld, in his will of 1610, bequeathes to his cosen Joane Slany, wife of Humphrey Slany, the lease of his garden near Moorfields and Moorgate. Dame Mary mentions Dorothy, the daughter of her cozen Humphrey Slaney: an allegation for the marriage of Dorothy Slaney aged about 19, daughter of Humfrey, to William Clobery aged about 20, both of St Martin's Ironmonger Lane, was registered in London on 6 April 1621. Humphrey Slany and William Cloberry operated as partners in the West Africa trade during the 1620s. John Slany was, according to his will, born at Barrow, Shropshire, in the neighbourhood of Willey, seat of the Weld family, and of Linley, where the Slaneys held the farm estate called "The Hem": this group of villages lies just south of Broseley. It appears likely from these evidences that John and Humphrey were sons of a brother of Sir Stephen Slaney's, but whether of Henry Slany, or of another, is not settled. The John Slany who became Secretary of the Newfoundland Company is also taken to be the same person: John and Humphrey Slany are named in James I's charter to the company, and had a significant place in its story.
