= Laurence Lunceford =

English Member of Parliament

Laurence Lunceford (before 1387 - 1405-06 or after), of Rye, Sussex, was an English Member of Parliament (MP).

He was a Member of the Parliament of England for Rye in October 1383, January 1390 and 1391. He was Mayor of Rye August ?1387-8, 1389–90, 1392-3.
