= William atte Vawte =

English Member of Parliament

William atte Vawte (unknown - June 1413 or after), was an English mayor and Member of Parliament (MP).

He was a Member of the Parliament of England for Rye in September 1388, 1399 and 1406. He was Mayor of Rye August 1397-9, and 1401-3.
