= Laurence Corboyle =

English Member of Parliament

Laurence Corboyle (before 1366 - 1390 or after), of Rye, Sussex, was an English Member of Parliament (MP).

He was a Member of the Parliament of England for Rye in January 1377, 1385 and January 1390.
