= Laurence Mersey =

English Member of Parliament

Laurence Mersey (born before 1404 - died after 1414), of Rye, East Sussex, was an English Member of Parliament (MP).

He was a Member of the Parliament of England for Rye in 1406.
