= Thomas Hamon =

English Member of Parliament

Thomas Hamon or Hammon (1550–1607), of Rye, Sussex, was an English Member of Parliament.

He was a Member (MP) of the Parliament of England for Rye in 1597 and 1604 – 27 July 1607. He was Mayor of Rye 1595–7, 1599–1601, and 1605–?.
