= Thomas Fotherley =

English Member of Parliament

Thomas Fotherley (c. 1580 – 1649/50), of Rickmansworth, Hertfordshire and St. Margaret's, Westminster; later of The Mews, Westminster, was an English Member of Parliament. He was a Member (MP) of the Parliament of England for Rye in 1625, 1626 and 1628.
