= John Bredes =

English Member of Parliament

John Bredes (died 1572) of Rye, Sussex, was an English Member of Parliament.

He was a Member (MP) of the Parliament of England for Rye in 1563. He was Mayor of Rye 1560-1 and 1569–70.
