= Thomas Dannett =

English politician (1543–1601)

Thomas Dannett (1543–1601), of Stockland Lovell, Somerset and London, was an English Member of Parliament.

He was a member (MP) of the parliament of England for Maidstone in 1572. He was the brother of Audley Dannett.
