= John Baddyng =

John Baddyng (fl. 1382–1401), of Rye, Sussex, was an English Member of Parliament (MP).

He was a Member of the Parliament of England for Rye in 1386, 1393, 1395, 1399, 1402 and 1407. He was Mayor of Rye August 1390–1, 1393-4 and 1395–7.
