= Audley Dannett =

English Member of Parliament

Audley Dannett (c. 1546 – 1591), of St. Andrew-in-the-Wardrobe, London, was an English Member of Parliament. He was the brother of MP, Thomas Dannett. He was a Member (MP) of the Parliament of England for Rye in 1589.
