= Henry Gaymer =

English Member of Parliament

Henry Gaymer (died 1596), of Green Hall, Rye, Sussex, was an English Member of Parliament. He was a Member (MP) of the Parliament of England for Rye in 1572, 1586 and 1593. He was Mayor of Rye 1572–3, 1588–9, 1589–90.
