= Mersey (disambiguation) =

The River Mersey is in northwest England, flowing past Liverpool.

Mersey may also refer to:

== Places ==
- Electoral division of Mersey in the state of Tasmania, Australia
- Mersey Forest, Tasmania, a locality in Australia

== Rivers ==
- Mersey River (Tasmania), Australia
- Mersey River (Nova Scotia), Canada

== Ships etc. ==
- Mersey (1801 ship), wrecked off Torres Strait, Australia, in 1805
- Mersey (1894 ship), a Nourse Line and White Star Line vessel scrapped in 1923
- Mersey-class lifeboat, lifeboats operating around Britain and Ireland
- MS Stena Mersey, a ferry operating across the Irish Sea until 2021

== People ==
- Laurence Mersey, 15th-century English MP for Rye
- Robert Mersey (1917–1994), American music arranger and record producer

== See also ==
- Mersea Island, off the coast of Essex in England (formerly Mersey Island)
