= Richard Inglet =

English Member of Parliament

Richard Inglet (by 1490-1544 or later), of Rye, Sussex, was an English Member of Parliament (MP).

He was a Member of the Parliament of England for Rye in 1529 and 1536. He was Mayor of Rye 1529–30, 1533–4, 1536–7.
