= Robert Carpenter (MP) =

English politician

Robert Carpenter (died 1607), of Rye, Sussex, was an English mayor and member of parliament.

He was a member (MP) of the parliament of England for Rye in 1572, 1584, 1586, 1589 and 1593. He was Mayor of Rye 1583–4, 1584–5, 1590–1, and 1591–2.
