= William Oxenbridge =

English Member of Parliament

William Oxenbridge, Oxbridge or Uxbridge (by 1498–1550), of Rye and Winchelsea, Sussex and London, was an English Member of Parliament (MP). He was a Member of the Parliament of England for Rye in 1542. He was Mayor of Winchelsea 1549–50.
