= William Marchaunt (MP for Rye) =

English Member of Parliament

William Marchaunt (died 1423/4), of Iden, Sussex, was an English Member of Parliament (MP).

He was a Member of the Parliament of England for Rye in February 1388.
