= Rye (constituency) =

Former parliamentary constituency in the United Kingdom

- Former county constituency for the House of Commons
- County: East Sussex
- Major settlements: Rye

1955–1983
- Seats: One
- Created from: Hastings
- Replaced by: Hastings and Rye, Bexhill and Battle and Wealden

1885–1950
- Type of constituency: County constituency
- Replaced by: Eastbourne, East Grinstead and Hastings

1366–1885
- Seats: 1366–1640: One; 1640–1832: Two; 1832–1885: One
- Type of constituency: Borough constituency

Rye was a parliamentary constituency centred on the town of Rye in East Sussex. It returned two Members of Parliament to the Parliament of England before 1707, Parliament of Great Britain until 1801 and the House of Commons of the Parliament of the United Kingdom until its representation was halved under the Reform Act 1832.

From the 1832 general election, Rye returned one Member of Parliament until its abolition for the 1950 general election, when the town of Rye itself was transferred to the redrawn Hastings constituency.

The constituency was re-created for the 1955 general election, and abolished again for the 1983 general election when it was largely replaced by the Bexhill and Battle parliamentary constituency.

== Boundaries ==
1885–1918: The Municipal Boroughs of Hastings and Rye, the Sessional Divisions of Battle, Burwash, Frant, Hastings, and Rye, the ancient town of Winchelsea, and the Liberty of the Sluice and Petit Iham.

1918–1950: The Municipal Boroughs of Bexhill and Rye, the Urban District of Battle, the Rural Districts of Battle, Hastings, Rye, and Ticehurst, and in the Rural District of Hailsham the civil parishes of Heathfield, Herstmonceux, Hooe, Ninfield, Warbleton, and Wartling.

1955–1983: The Municipal Boroughs of Bexhill and Rye, the Rural District of Battle, and part of the Rural District of Hailsham.

== Members of Parliament ==
=== MPs 1366–1640 ===
Parliament	First Member	Second Member
1372	John Salerne	
1373	John Salerne	
1381	Simon Lunceford	
1386	Stephen Elyot	John Baddyng
1388 (Feb)	Stephen Elyot	William Marchaunt
1388 (Sep)	William atte Vawte	John Macop
1390 (Jan)	Laurence Lunceford	Laurence Corboyle
1390 (Nov)		
1391	John Salerne	Laurence Lunceford
1393	John Baddyng	John Bertelot
1394		
1395	John Baddyng	William Ormed
1397 (Jan)	Richard Tichebourne	John Langeport
1397 (Sep)		
1399	John Baddyng	William atte Vawte
1401		
1402	John Baddyng	John Roberd
1404 (Jan)		
1404 (Oct)		
1406	William atte Vawte	Laurence Mersey
1407	John Baddyng	Thomas Long
1410	John Shelley	William Long
1411		
1413 (Feb)		
1413 (May)	William Long	Robert Onewyn
1414 (Apr)		
1414 (Nov)	William Long	Robert Onewyn
1415		
1416 (Mar)		
1416 (Oct)		
1417	John Shelley	Richard Posterf
1419	Robert Onewyn	William Long
1420	John Shelley	William Long
1421 (May)	Robert Onewyn	Thomas Piers
1421 (Dec)	William Thirlwall	John Shelley
1504	Richard Berkeley	
1510	Nicholas Sutton	Richard Berkeley
1512	Nicholas Sutton	Robert Mede
1515	Robert Mede	Nicholas Sutton
1523	Thomas Cheseman alias Baker	Thomas Basseden
1529	Nicholas Sutton, died and replaced by 1534 by Richard Inglet	John Fletcher
1536	Richard Inglet	John Fletcher
1539	Thomas Birchet	William Mede
1542	John Fletcher	William Oxenbridge
1545	Alexander Welles	Robert Wymond
1547	Alexander Welles	George Reynolds
1553 (Mar)	Richard Fletcher	John Holmes
1553 (Oct)	Clement Heigham	John Holmes
1554 (Apr)	John Holmes	Richard Fletcher
1554 (Nov)	John Holmes	Thomas Smith
1555	John Holmes	Reginald Mohun
1558	Thomas Fletcher	Thomas Cheyne
1559	Richard Fletcher I	Robert Marche
1562–3	George Reynolds I	John Bredes
1571	John Donning	Thomas Fanshawe
1572	Clement Cobbe, died and replaced July 1575 by Robert Carpenter	Henry Gaymer
1584	John Hammond	Robert Carpenter
1586	Henry Gaymer	Robert Carpenter
1588–9	Audley Dannett	Robert Carpenter
1593	Henry Gaymer	Robert Carpenter
1597	Sampson Lennard	Thomas Hamon
1601	Sir Arthur Gorges	Thomas Colepeper
1604–1611	Thomas Hamon, died and replaced by Heneage Finch	John Young
1614	Edward Hendon	Thomas Watson
1621–1622	Emanuel Gifford	John Angell
1624	Thomas Conway	Sir Edward Conway, sat for Warwick and replaced by John Angel
1625	Thomas Fotherley	Sir John Sackville
1626	Thomas Fotherley	Sir John Sackville
1628	Richard Tufton	Thomas Fotherley
1629–1640	No Parliaments summoned	

=== MPs 1640–1832 ===
Year	First member	First party	Second member	Second party
April 1640	John Culpepper			
November 1640	Sir John Jacob	Royalist	John White	Royalist
1641	William Hay	Parliamentarian	John White	Royalist
February 1644	William Hay	Parliamentarian	White disabled from sitting - seat vacant	
1645	William Hay	Parliamentarian	John Fagg	
1653	Rye was unrepresented in the Barebones Parliament			
1654	Herbert Morley		Rye had only one seat in the First and Second Parliaments of the Protectorate	
1656	William Hay		Rye had only one seat in the First and Second Parliaments of the Protectorate	
January 1659	William Hay		Mark Thomas	
May 1659	Not represented in the restored Rump			
April 1660	Herbert Morley		William Hay	
May 1661	Herbert Morley		Richard Spencer	
November 1661	Herbert Morley		Sir John Robinson, 1st Baronet	
1667	Sir John Austen, 2nd Baronet		Sir John Robinson, 1st Baronet	
February 1679	Thomas Frewen		Sir John Robinson, 1st Baronet	
October 1679	Thomas Frewen		Sir John Darrel	
1685	Thomas Frewen		Sir Thomas Jenner	
January 1689	Thomas Frewen		Sir John Darrel	
April 1689	Sir John Austen, 2nd Baronet		Sir John Darrel	
1694	Sir John Austen, 2nd Baronet		Thomas Frewen	
1698	Sir John Austen, 2nd Baronet		Joseph Offley	Country Whig
1699	Sir Robert Austen, 3rd Baronet		Joseph Offley	Country Whig
1701	Thomas Fagg		Joseph Offley	Country Whig
1702	Thomas Fagg		Edward Southwell	Tory
1705	Philip Herbert		Edward Southwell	Tory
1707	Phillips Gybbon	Whig	Edward Southwell	Tory
1708	Phillips Gybbon	Whig	Admiral Sir John Norris	
1722	Phillips Gybbon	Whig	The Lord Aylmer	
1727	Phillips Gybbon	Whig	John Norris	
1733	Phillips Gybbon	Whig	Matthew Norris	
1734	Phillips Gybbon	Whig	Admiral Sir John Norris	
1749	Phillips Gybbon	Whig	Thomas Pelham	
1754	Phillips Gybbon	Whig	George Onslow	
1761	Phillips Gybbon	Whig	Captain John Bentinck	
1762	John Norris		Captain John Bentinck	
1768	John Norris		Rose Fuller	
1774	Middleton Onslow		Rose Fuller	
1775	Hon. Thomas Onslow		Rose Fuller	
1777	Hon. Thomas Onslow		William Dickinson	
1784	Charles Wolfran Cornwall		William Dickinson	
1789	Charles Long	Tory	William Dickinson	
1790	Charles Long	Tory	Hon. Robert Jenkinson	Tory
1796	Robert Dundas	Tory	Hon. Robert Jenkinson	Tory
1801	The Lord de Blaquiere	Tory	Hon. Robert Jenkinson	Tory
1802	Thomas Davis Lamb	Tory	Hon. Robert Jenkinson	Tory
1803 by-election	Thomas Davis Lamb	Tory	Sir Charles Talbot	Tory
April 1806 by-election	Major General the Hon. Sir Arthur Wellesley	Tory	Sir Charles Talbot	Tory
November 1806	Patrick Craufurd Bruce	Whig	Michael Angelo Taylor	Whig
May 1807	Sir John Nicholl	Tory	The Earl of Clancarty	Tory
July 1807 by-election	Sir William Elford	Tory	Stephen Rumbold Lushington	Tory
1808 by-election	William Jacob	Tory	Stephen Rumbold Lushington	Tory
October 1812	Thomas Phillipps Lamb	Tory	Sir Henry Sullivan also elected at Lincoln	Tory
December 1812 by-election	Thomas Phillipps Lamb	Tory	Charles Wetherell	Tory
1813 by-election	Thomas Phillipps Lamb	Tory	Richard Arkwright	Tory
1816 by-election	John Maberly	Whig	Richard Arkwright	Tory
1818	Charles Arbuthnot	Tory	Peter Browne	Tory
February 1819 by-election	Thomas Phillipps Lamb	Tory	Peter Browne	Tory
July 1819	John Dodson	Tory	Peter Browne	Tory
1823 by-election	Robert Knight	Whig	Peter Browne	Tory
1826	Richard Arkwright	Tory	Henry Bonham	Tory
March 1830 by-election	Richard Arkwright	Tory	Philip Pusey	Tory
May 1830	Richard Arkwright	Tory	De Lacy Evans	Radical
August 1830	Hugh Duncan Baillie	Whig	Francis Robert Bonham	Tory
1831	Thomas Pemberton	Tory	De Lacy Evans	Radical
1832	Representation reduced to one member			

=== MPs 1832–1950 ===
Election	Member	Party
1832	Edward Barrett Curteis	Whig
1837	Thomas Gybbon Monypenny	Conservative
1841	Herbert Barrett Curteis	Whig
1847 by-election	Herbert Mascall Curteis	Whig
1852	William Alexander Mackinnon (younger)	Whig
1853 by-election	William Alexander Mackinnon (elder)	Peelite
1859	William Alexander Mackinnon (elder)	Liberal
1865	Lauchlan Bellingham Mackinnon	Liberal
1868	John Gathorne-Hardy	Conservative
1880	Frederick Inderwick	Liberal
1885	Arthur Montagu Brookfield	Conservative
1903 by-election	Charles Frederick Hutchinson	Liberal
1906	George Courthope	Conservative
1945	William Cuthbert	Conservative
1950	constituency abolished	

=== MPs 1955–1983 ===
Election	Member	Party
1955	Godman Irvine	Conservative
1983	constituency abolished	

== Elections ==
=== Elections in the 1830s ===
Bonham resigned, causing a by-election.

By-election, 1 March 1830: Rye
Party	Candidate	Votes	%	±%
Tory	Philip Pusey	10	83.3	
Radical	George de Lacy Evans	2	16.7	
Majority		8	66.6	
Turnout		12	c. 60.0	
Registered electors		c. 20		
Tory hold		Swing	N/A	

- 15 votes for De Lacy Evans were rejected but, after petition, he was declared elected on 17 May 1830 and Pusey's election was declared void.

General election 1830: Rye
Party	Candidate	Votes	%	±%
Whig	Hugh Duncan Baillie	12	33.3	
Tory	Francis Robert Bonham	12	33.3	
Radical	George de Lacy Evans	6	16.7	
Whig	Benjamin Smith	6	16.7	
Turnout		18	c. 90.0	
Registered electors		c. 20		
Majority		0	0.0	N/A
Whig gain from Tory		Swing		
Majority		6	16.6	
Tory hold		Swing		

- 200 inhabitants voted for Evans and Smith, but these were rejected

General election 1831: Rye
Party	Candidate	Votes	%	±%
Radical	George de Lacy Evans	7	41.2	+24.5
Tory	Thomas Pemberton	5	29.4	+12.8
Tory	Philip Pusey	3	17.6	+1.0
Whig	Benjamin Smith	2	11.8	−21.5
Whig	Alexander Donovan	0	0.0	−16.7
Turnout		10	c. 50.0	c. −40.0
Registered electors		c. 20		
Majority		5	29.4	N/A
Radical gain from Whig		Swing	+21.8	
Majority		2	11.8	−4.8
Tory hold		Swing	+16.0	

- A riot broke out during the poll and it was then agreed that Pusey withdrew from the contest on the condition that De Lacy Evan's party would protect the peace of the town. Just three electors polled on the second day.

General election 1832: Rye
Party	Candidate	Votes	%	±%
Whig	Edward Barrett Curteis	162	55.9	+44.1
Radical	George de Lacy Evans	128	44.1	+2.9
Majority		34	11.8	N/A
Turnout		290	68.7	c. +18.7
Registered electors		422		
Whig gain from Radical		Swing	+20.6	

General election 1835: Rye
Party	Candidate	Votes	%	±%
Whig	Edward Barrett Curteis	211	67.6	+11.7
Conservative	Thomas Gybbon Monypenny	101	32.4	New
Majority		110	35.2	+23.4
Turnout		312	66.2	−2.5
Registered electors		471		
Whig hold		Swing	+11.7	

General election 1837: Rye
Party	Candidate	Votes	%
Conservative	Thomas Gybbon Monypenny	Unopposed	
Registered electors		523	
Conservative gain from Whig			

=== Elections in the 1840s ===
General election 1841: Rye
Party	Candidate	Votes	%	±%
Whig	Herbert Barrett Curteis	262	70.8	New
Conservative	Charles Frewen	108	29.2	N/A
Majority		154	41.6	N/A
Turnout		370	64.7	N/A
Registered electors		572		
Whig gain from Conservative		Swing	N/A	

General election 1847: Rye
Party	Candidate	Votes	%	±%
Whig	Herbert Barrett Curteis	239	67.9	−2.9
Conservative	Benjamin Bacon Williams	113	32.1	+2.9
Majority		126	35.8	−5.8
Turnout		352	61.3	−3.4
Registered electors		574		
Whig hold		Swing	−2.9	

Curteis' death caused a by-election.

By-election, 23 December 1847: Rye
Party	Candidate	Votes	%	±%
Whig	Herbert Mascall Curteis	Unopposed		
Whig hold				

Curteis' election was declared void on petition on 27 March 1848, due to insufficient notice being given of the election, causing a by-election.

By-election, 6 April 1848: Rye
Party	Candidate	Votes	%	±%
Whig	Herbert Mascall Curteis	Unopposed		
Whig hold				

=== Elections in the 1850s ===
General election 1852: Rye
Party	Candidate	Votes	%	±%
Whig	William Alexander Mackinnon (younger)	240	53.6	−14.3
Conservative	Richard Curteis Pomfret	208	46.4	+14.3
Majority		32	7.2	−28.6
Turnout		448	79.7	+18.4
Registered electors		562		
Whig hold		Swing	−14.3	

Mackinnon was unseated when his election was declared void on petition due to bribery and treating, causing a by-election. £220 was left behind a sofa cushion at the Red Lion to pay for a dinner.

By-election, 23 May 1853: Rye
Party	Candidate	Votes	%	±%
Peelite	William Alexander Mackinnon (elder)	216	54.0	+0.4
Conservative	Richard Curteis Pomfret	184	46.0	−0.4
Majority		32	8.0	+0.8
Turnout		400	78.7	−1.0
Registered electors		508		
Peelite gain from Whig		Swing	+0.4	

General election 1857: Rye
Party	Candidate	Votes	%	±%
Peelite	William Alexander Mackinnon (elder)	Unopposed		
Registered electors		462		
Peelite gain from Whig				

General election 1859: Rye
Party	Candidate	Votes	%	±%
Liberal	William Alexander Mackinnon (elder)	Unopposed		
Registered electors		470		
Liberal hold				

=== Elections in the 1860s ===
General election 1865: Rye
Party	Candidate	Votes	%	±%
Liberal	Lauchlan Bellingham Mackinnon	180	51.1	N/A
Conservative	William Macdonald Macdonald	172	48.9	New
Majority		8	2.2	N/A
Turnout		352	94.4	N/A
Registered electors		373		
Liberal hold		Swing	N/A	

General election 1868: Rye
Party	Candidate	Votes	%	±%
Conservative	John Hardy	513	50.7	+1.8
Liberal	William Jones-Loyd	499	49.3	−1.8
Majority		14	1.4	N/A
Turnout		1,012	83.8	−10.6
Registered electors		1,208		
Conservative gain from Liberal		Swing	+1.8	

=== Elections in the 1870s ===
General election 1874: Rye
Party	Candidate	Votes	%	±%
Conservative	John Hardy	597	52.6	+1.9
Liberal	Albert Fytche	539	47.4	−1.9
Majority		58	5.2	+3.8
Turnout		1,136	88.3	+4.5
Registered electors		1,287		
Conservative hold		Swing	+1.9	

=== Elections in the 1880s ===
General election 1880: Rye
Party	Candidate	Votes	%	±%
Liberal	Frederick Inderwick	626	50.3	+2.9
Conservative	John Gathorne-Hardy	618	49.7	−2.9
Majority		8	0.6	N/A
Turnout		1,244	89.6	+1.3
Registered electors		1,389		
Liberal gain from Conservative		Swing	+2.9	

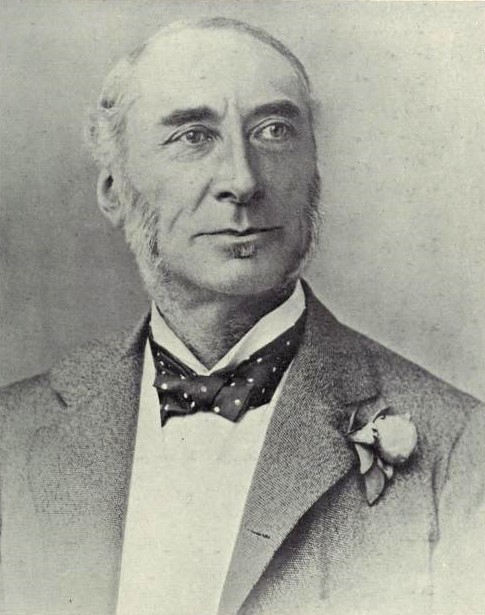
Inderwick

General election 1885: Rye
Party	Candidate	Votes	%	±%
Conservative	Arthur Montagu Brookfield	4,526	51.3	+1.6
Liberal	Frederick Inderwick	4,303	48.7	−1.6
Majority		223	2.6	N/A
Turnout		8,829	85.7	−3.9
Registered electors		10,304		
Conservative gain from Liberal		Swing	+1.6	

General election 1886: Rye
Party	Candidate	Votes	%	±%
Conservative	Arthur Montagu Brookfield	4,592	59.7	+8.4
Liberal	George Julius de Reuter	3,094	40.3	−8.4
Majority		1,498	19.4	+16.8
Turnout		7,686	74.6	−11.1
Registered electors		10,304		
Conservative hold		Swing	+8.4	

=== Elections in the 1890s ===
General election 1892: Rye
Party	Candidate	Votes	%	±%
Conservative	Arthur Montagu Brookfield	4,699	54.1	−5.6
Lib-Lab	George M. Ball	3,988	45.9	+5.6
Majority		711	8.2	−11.2
Turnout		8,687	77.8	+3.2
Registered electors		11,159		
Conservative hold		Swing	-5.6	

General election 1895: Rye
Party	Candidate	Votes	%	±%
Conservative	Arthur Montagu Brookfield	Unopposed		
Conservative hold				

=== Elections in the 1900s ===
Hutchinson

General election 1900: Rye
Party	Candidate	Votes	%	±%
Conservative	Arthur Montagu Brookfield	5,376	65.1	N/A
Liberal	Charles Frederick Hutchinson	2,887	34.9	New
Majority		2,489	30.2	N/A
Turnout		8,263	69.7	N/A
Registered electors		11,856		
Conservative hold		Swing	N/A	

1903 Rye by-election
Party	Candidate	Votes	%	±%
Liberal	Charles Frederick Hutchinson	4,910	52.9	+18.0
Conservative	Edward Boyle	4,376	47.1	−18.0
Majority		534	5.8	N/A
Turnout		9,286	74.0	+4.3
Registered electors		12,543		
Liberal gain from Conservative		Swing	+18.0	

General election 1906: Rye
Party	Candidate	Votes	%	±%
Conservative	George Courthope	6,122	55.2	−9.9
Liberal	Charles Frederick Hutchinson	4,964	44.8	+9.9
Majority		1,158	10.4	−19.8
Turnout		11,086	86.3	+16.6
Registered electors		12,842		
Conservative hold		Swing	−9.9	

=== Elections in the 1910s ===
General election January 1910: Rye
Party	Candidate	Votes	%	±%
Conservative	George Courthope	7,352	60.8	+5.6
Liberal	St John Hutchinson	4,750	39.2	−5.6
Majority		2,602	21.6	+11.2
Turnout		12,102	88.0	+1.7
Conservative hold		Swing	+5.6	

General election December 1910: Rye
Party	Candidate	Votes	%	±%
Conservative	George Courthope	6,673	59.9	−0.9
Liberal	St John Hutchinson	4,461	40.1	+0.9
Majority		2,212	19.8	−1.8
Turnout		11,134	81.0	−7.0
Conservative hold		Swing		

General election 1918: Rye
Party		Candidate	Votes	%	±%
C	Unionist	George Courthope	10,378	72.0	+12.1
	Liberal	George Ellis	4,034	28.0	−12.1
Majority			6,344	44.0	+23.2
Turnout			14,412	53.1	−27.9
	Unionist hold		Swing		
C indicates candidate endorsed by the coalition government.

=== Elections in the 1920s ===
General election 1922: Rye
Party	Candidate	Votes	%	±%
Unionist	George Courthope	10,922	59.3	−12.7
Liberal	George Ellis	7,488	40.7	+12.7
Majority		3,434	18.6	−25.4
Turnout		18,480	62.4	+11.3
Unionist hold		Swing	-12.7	

General election 1923: Rye
Party	Candidate	Votes	%	±%
Unionist	George Courthope	11,167	53.6	−5.7
Liberal	George Ellis	9,651	46.4	+5.7
Majority		1,516	7.2	−11.4
Turnout		20,818	69.4	+7.0
Unionist hold		Swing	-5.7	

General election 1924: Rye
Party	Candidate	Votes	%	±%
Unionist	George Courthope	14,871	67.1	+13.5
Liberal	George Ellis	7,289	32.9	−13.5
Majority		7,582	34.2	+27.0
Turnout		22,160	71.2	+1.8
Unionist hold		Swing		

General election 1929: Rye
Party	Candidate	Votes	%	±%
Unionist	George Courthope	18,061	56.9	−10.2
Liberal	William Stanley Osborn	10,198	32.1	−0.8
Labour	George A. Greenwood	3,505	11.0	New
Majority		7,863	24.8	−9.4
Turnout		31,764	72.2	+1.0
Unionist hold		Swing	-4.7	

=== Elections in the 1930s ===
General election 1931: Rye
Party	Candidate	Votes	%	±%
Conservative	George Courthope	Unopposed	N/A	N/A
Conservative hold				

General election 1935: Rye
Party	Candidate	Votes	%	±%
Conservative	George Courthope	22,604	71.2	N/A
Liberal	Dorothy Frances Osborn	9,162	28.8	New
Majority		13,442	42.4	N/A
Turnout		31,766	64.2	N/A
Conservative hold		Swing	N/A	

=== Elections in the 1940s ===
General Election 1939–40: Another General Election was required to take place before the end of 1940. The political parties had been making preparations for an election to take place from 1939 and by the end of this year, the following candidates had been selected;

- Conservative: George Courthope
- Independent Progressive: John Langdon-Davies

General election 1945: Rye
Party	Candidate	Votes	%	±%
Conservative	William Cuthbert	19,701	58.6	−12.6
Labour	B Simmons	7,414	22.0	New
Liberal	Ronald Ogden	6,530	19.4	−9.4
Majority		12,287	36.6	−5.8
Turnout		33,645	70.8	+6.6
Conservative hold		Swing		

=== Elections in the 1950s ===
General election 1955: Rye
Party	Candidate	Votes	%	±%
Conservative	Godman Irvine	28,500	72.96	
Labour	Trevor L Payne	10,560	27.04	
Majority		17,940	45.92	
Turnout		39,060	73.39	
Conservative hold		Swing		

General election 1959: Rye
Party	Candidate	Votes	%	±%
Conservative	Godman Irvine	27,465	64.8	−8.2
Liberal	John R Murray	7,549	17.8	New
Labour	Douglas Sidney Tilbé	7,359	17.4	−9.6
Majority		19,916	47.0	+1.1
Turnout		42,373		
Conservative hold		Swing		

=== Elections in the 1960s ===
General election 1964: Rye
Party	Candidate	Votes	%	±%
Conservative	Godman Irvine	27,240	59.8	−5.0
Liberal	Kenneth Grenville Wellings	10,264	22.6	+4.8
Labour	Anthony Edmund Arblaster	8,014	17.6	+0.2
Majority		16,976	37.2	−9.8
Turnout		45,518	77.5	
Conservative hold		Swing	-4.9	

General election 1966: Rye
Party	Candidate	Votes	%	±%
Conservative	Godman Irvine	27,056	58.6	−1.2
Liberal	Kenneth Grenville Wellings	9,957	21.6	−1.0
Labour	David R Collins	9,155	19.8	+2.2
Majority		17,099	37.0	−0.2
Turnout		46,168	75.7	−1.8
Conservative hold		Swing	-0.1	

=== Elections in the 1970s ===
General election 1970: Rye
Party	Candidate	Votes	%	±%
Conservative	Godman Irvine	32,300	64.2	+5.6
Labour	Henry Arthur Fountain	9,031	18.0	−1.8
Liberal	Robin Kenneth John Frederick Young	8,947	17.8	−3.8
Majority		23,269	46.2	+9.2
Turnout		50,278	73.0	−2.7
Conservative hold		Swing	+3.6	

General election February 1974: Rye
Party	Candidate	Votes	%	±%
Conservative	Godman Irvine	33.591	57.9	−6.3
Liberal	Douglas Roland S Moore	17,456	30.1	+12.3
Labour	Robert W Harris	6,967	12.0	−6.0
Majority		16,135	27.8	−18.4
Turnout		58,014	80.8	+7.8
Conservative hold		Swing		

General election October 1974: Rye
Party	Candidate	Votes	%	±%
Conservative	Godman Irvine	30,511	56.9	−1.0
Liberal	Douglas Roland S Moore	14,828	27.6	−2.5
Labour	David W Threlfall	8,303	15.5	+3.5
Majority		15,683	29.3	+1.5
Turnout		53,642	74.2	−6.6
Conservative hold		Swing	+0.7	

General election 1979: Rye
Party	Candidate	Votes	%	±%
Conservative	Godman Irvine	35,516	62.7	+5.8
Liberal	Douglas Roland S Moore	12,438	22.0	−5.6
Labour	Derek Smyth	6,852	12.1	−3.4
Ecology	Anne Rix	1,267	2.2	New
National Front	T. Duesbury	552	1.0	New
Majority		23,078	40.7	+11.4
Turnout		56,625	77.1	+2.9
Conservative hold		Swing	+5.9	

== See also ==
- Bexhill and Battle parliamentary constituency
