= George Reynolds (MP for Rye) =

16th-century English politician

George Reynolds (by 1518 – 1577) was an English politician.

He was a member (MP) of the parliament of England for Rye in 1547 and 1563. He was Mayor of Rye 1551–3, 1556–7, 1564–6.
