= Blois family =

Major landowners in Suffolk, England

Coat of Arms of the Blois family

The Blois family (formerly spelled, and usually pronounced, Bloyse) have been substantial landowners in Suffolk for several centuries. Until recently the family home was at Cockfield Hall in Yoxford, Suffolk, a Grade I listed private house standing in 40 acres (160,000 m^{2}) of historic parkland.

== Ipswich and Grundisburgh ==
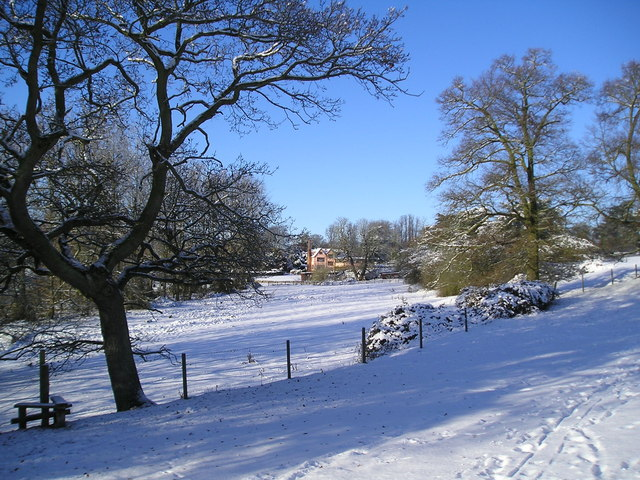
Grundisburgh Hall

The Blois family resided at Ipswich, and at Grundisburgh, near Woodbridge from the time of King Henry VII. Four generations were prominent merchants living in the parish of St Nicholas in Ipswich, of whom the first, Thomas Blois, is said to have married Margaret, daughter of William Styles of Ipswich, and died in 1528. (W.A. Copinger states that his father and grandfather were both also named Thomas.) The second, his son Richard Blois, who married Elizabeth, daughter of Roger Hill of Needham, lived in a house called "The Christopher", which at his death in 1559 he devised to the third, his son William Blois, who married Alice, daughter of William Nottingham, and died in 1607.

Thomas and William were both buried in St Nicholas's church, but Richard purchased property in Grundisburgh, and was buried in the church there. This property included an ancient farmhouse called "Sigers", which was added to by a younger William Blois (died 1621), an Ipswich merchant with houses in Ipswich and Grundisburgh (who married Frances, daughter of John Tye of Ipswich), and by his son William. Thus improved, "Sigers" became Grundisburgh Hall. Part of the early 17th century Grundisburgh Hall survives: it represents one range (only) of a much larger building of 16th and 17th century dates which formerly extended to the south of the present house, and was knocked down during the 1960s.

William (died 1621) (a benefactor of the Ipswich Town Preacher Samuel Ward), whose lands in north Suffolk at Sandcroft, Homersfield and Mendham were left to his younger son Francis, sent his elder son William to Pembroke College, Cambridge in 1617, from which he received MA in 1620, having entered Gray's Inn in 1619. This younger William married Elizabeth, daughter of Sir Thomas Wingfield of Letheringham, and had 5 sons and 6 daughters. He associated himself with the parliamentarian cause, was an elder of the Ipswich classis in 1645, and was a parliamentarian Captain of foot in 1643 and Colonel in 1645 and 1648. He sat as MP for Suffolk in 1654 and 1656, and for Ipswich from 1661 to 1673. He was knighted on 9 December 1661.

== Cockfield Hall, Yoxford ==
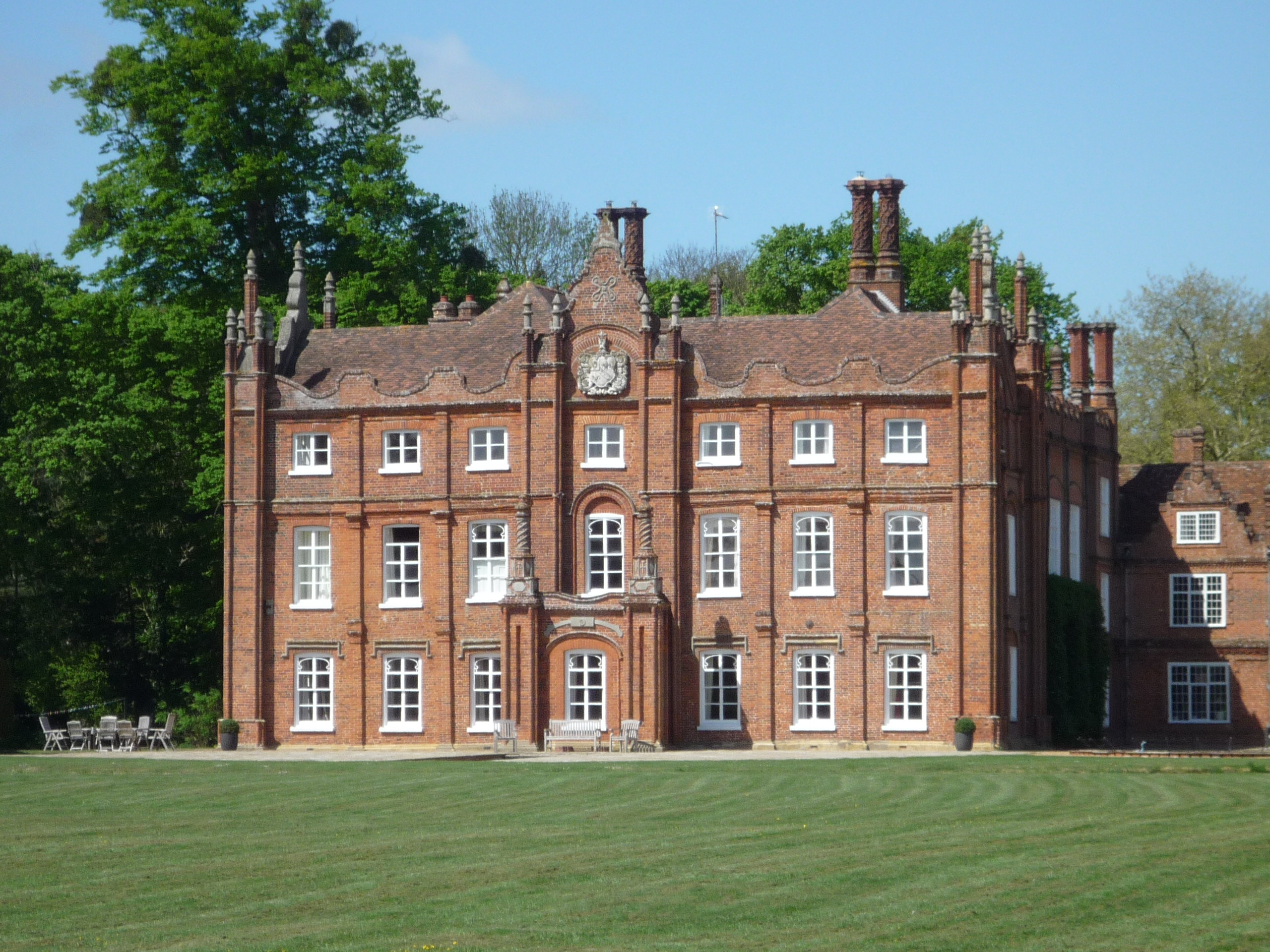
Cockfield Hall, Yoxford, former seat of the Blois family

In later life Sir William devoted himself to forming genealogical and heraldic collections, known as "The Blois MSS" which were continued by his son Sir William, the eldest of four but only surviving son, after the father's death in 1673. This young William married first Martha (daughter of Sir Robert Brooke of Cockfield Hall), who died in 1657 leaving him with an only son, Charles Blois (1657–1738). He married secondly Jane, daughter of Sir Nathaniel Barnardiston, of Ketton, Suffolk, the widow of Martha's brother John. William survived his father by only three years, and died in London in 1676: his widow Jane accepted administration at probate. The heraldic interest continued, for the remaining part of Grundisburgh Hall retained (at the time of listing, in 1966) a late 17th century mural painting of 70 coats of arms of East Anglian families.

Charles, having married Mary, daughter of Sir Robert Kemp, 2nd Baronet of Gissing Hall, Norfolk in 1680, was created Baronet Blois on 16 April 1686: in 1693, as coheir of his uncle Robert Brooke the younger, he succeeded his aunt Mary Brooke in the estate at Yoxford, and thereafter made his principal residence at Cockfield Hall, Yoxford, which had been purchased by the Brookes from the family of Sir Arthur Hopton (1488-1555). He sat as MP for Ipswich in 1689-1695 and for Dunwich in 1700–1709. In 1694 he married the second time, to Anne, daughter of Ralph Hawtrey. In addition to some brothers who did not survive, the 1st Baronet had a sister Mary who married first Sir Nevil Catelyn of Kirby Cane, and second Sir Charles Turner.

Sir Charles had a son William, but was succeeded at his death by his grandson Sir Charles Blois, 2nd Baronet, who remained unmarried at his death in 1760. The title then reverted to his uncle Sir Charles, 3rd Baronet, who, however, died without issue in 1761. The title then passed to a half-brother (son of the 1st Baronet's second marriage), Sir Ralph, 4th Baronet, and although he succumbed in 1762, his son Sir John, 5th Baronet, succeeded and became a strong upholder of the family name and title for many years, dying in 1810. He did, however, sell the manor of Grundisburgh to Brampton Gurdon Dillingham of Letton, Norfolk, from whom it became vested in the Lords Cranworth.

== After Grundisburgh ==
Sir John first married Sarah, daughter of Sir George Thornhill of Diddington, Huntingdonshire, with whom he had one son, Charles, and a daughter, and secondly Miss Ottley of the island of Saint Kitts in the West Indies, by whom he had two further daughters. At his death he was succeeded by Sir Charles, 6th Baronet, who married Clara, daughter of Jocelyn Price, Esq., of Camblesforth Hall, Yorkshire (which became a Blois family seat), and produced four sons and three daughters. Sir Charles died in December 1829 and was succeeded by his son Sir Charles, 7th Baronet. The 8th Baronet was Sir John Ralph Blois (1830–1888), whose memorial is in Blythburgh church, and whose great-granddaughter is actress Celia Imrie.

The 9th Baronet was Sir Ralph Barrett MacNaghten Blois, who married Winifred Grace Hegan Kennard. Their son Sir Gervase Ralph Edmund Blois, 10th Baronet, was born on 6 June 1901. He was educated at Wellington College, Berkshire, England and the Royal Military College, Sandhurst. He was aide-de-camp to the Governor of Bengal between 1925 and 1928. He married, firstly, Audrey Winifred Johnson, daughter of Colonel Harry Johnson, on 20 September 1938. He gained the rank of captain in 1939 in the service of the Scots Guards. He fought in the Second World War and was decorated with the Military Cross (M.C.) in 1944, the Croix de Guerre and the Legion of Honour. He and Audrey Winifred Johnson were divorced in 1948. He married, secondly, Margaret Lucia White, daughter of Major Hon. Charles James White and Evelyn Bulkeley-Johnson, on 24 April 1948. He succeeded to the title of 10th Baronet Blois, of Grundisburgh and Cockfield Hall, near Yoxford, Suffolk on 18 March 1950. He died on 22 May 1968 at age 66.

== After Cockfield Hall ==
The family continue to be patrons of Blythburgh church, and the current head of the Blois family is still a major landowner in north-east Suffolk. Sir Charles Blois however no longer owns Cockfield Hall.

== See also ==
- Charles, Duke of Brittany — Charles de Blois
- Flavia Blois
