= Stephen Elyot =

English Member of Parliament

Stephen Elyot (died c. 1395), of Rye, Sussex, was an English mayor, Member of Parliament (MP) and vintner.

He was a Member of the Parliament of England for Rye in January 1377, 1378, 1381, February 1383, 1386 and February 1388. He was Mayor of Rye from August 1380 to 1382.
