= John Fletcher (MP for Rye) =

English politician

John Fletcher (by 1490 – 1545 or later) was an English politician.

He was a member (MP) of the parliament of England for Rye in 1529, 1536 and 1542.
