= John Holmes (died 1556 or later) =

English Member of Parliament

John Holmes (died 1556 or later), was an English Member of Parliament (MP).

He was a Member of the Parliament of England for Rye in March 1553, October 1553, April 1554, November 1554, and 1555. There are biographical details of several men of this name at the time, but none clearly identifiable as the MP. He served during the reign of Mary I of England and is not listed as one of the MPs who publicly objected to the restoration of Catholicism in England.
