= Richard Fletcher (Rye MP) =

16th-century English politician

Richard Fletcher (by 1523 – 1559/1560), of Rye, Sussex, was an English politician.

He was a member (MP) of the parliament of England for Rye in March 1553, April 1554 and 1559.
