= William Mede =

English Member of Parliament

William Mede (by 1495-1543/48), of Rye, Sussex, was an English Member of Parliament (MP).

He was a Member of the Parliament of England for Rye in 1539. He was probably the son of Robert Mede, also an MP for Rye.
