= Blythburgh Priory =

Priory in Blythburgh, Suffolk, England

Coordinates: 52.3217°N 1.5965°E

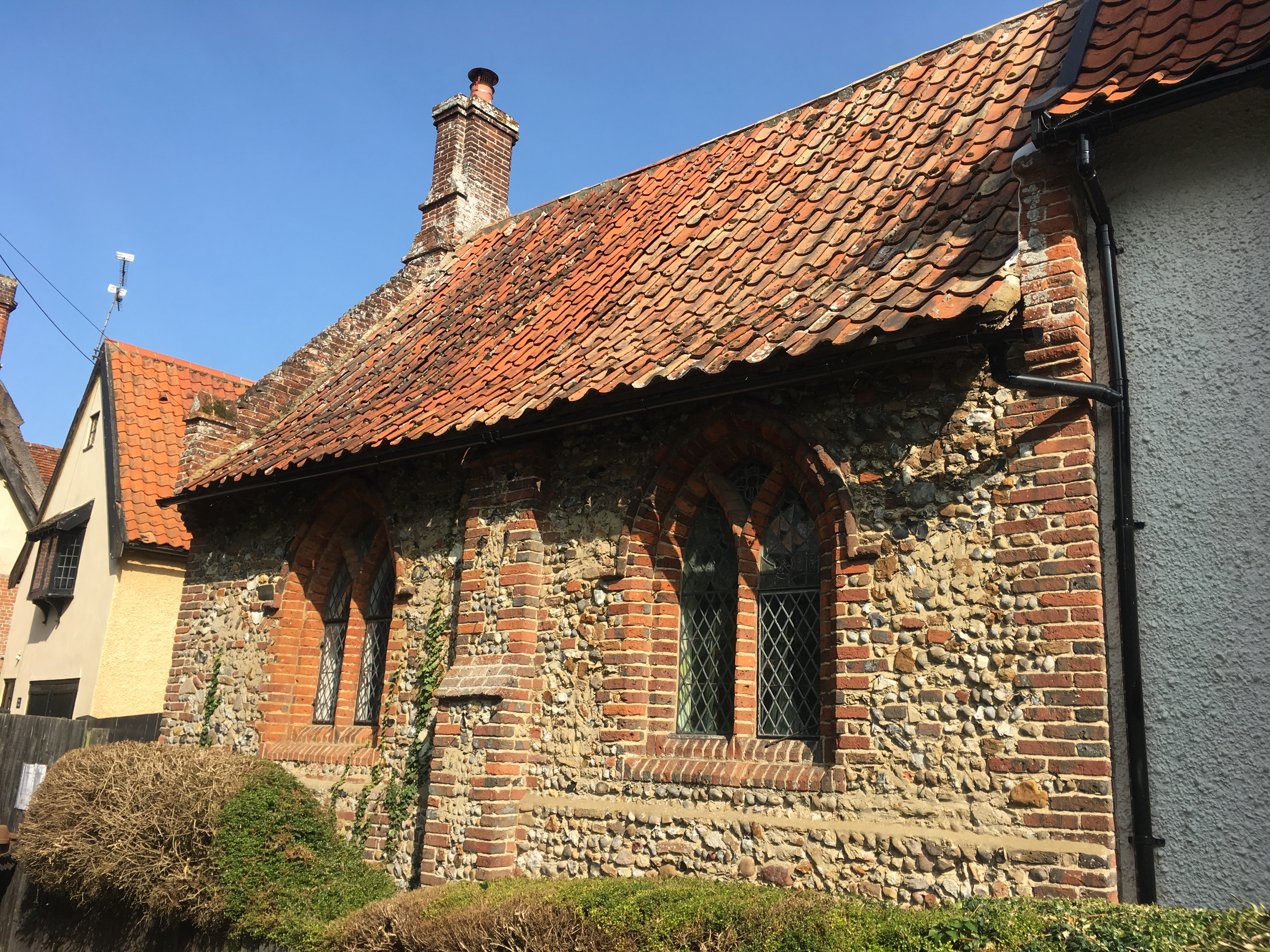
- One of the priory buildings in 2017
- Interactive map of Blythburgh Priory

Monastery information
- Order: Augustinian canons regular
- Denomination: Roman Catholicism
- Established: by 1147
- Disestablished: 12 February 1537
- Mother house: St Osyth's Priory
- Dedication: The Blessed Virgin Mary
- Consecrated: 1100s
- Diocese: Norwich
- Controlled churches: Holy Trinity Church; St Andrew's Church; St Andrew's Church; All Saints Church; St Peter's Church; St Peter's Church; St Andrew's Church

People
- Prior: John Righton

Architecture
- Status: Demolished
- Style: Early English Gothic
- Completed date: c. 1200

Site
- Location: Blythburgh, Suffolk
- Country: United Kingdom
- Visible remains: Walls incorporated into houses
- Public access: none

Blythburgh Priory was a medieval monastic house of Augustinian canons, dedicated to the Blessed Virgin Mary, located in the village of Blythburgh in Suffolk, England. Founded in the early 12th century, it was among the first Augustinian houses in England and began as a cell of St Osyth's Priory in Essex. Although it acquired a conventual life of its own, its community was always small and in some respects maintained dependency upon the parent house. It was earmarked for closure by Cardinal Wolsey during the late 1520s but survived his fall and continued until dissolution in 1536.

Although it stood near the medieval parish church of the Holy Trinity, Blythburgh, renowned landmark overlooking the estuary of the river Blyth, the Priory was a separate group of structures with its own large Norman church and conventual buildings in stone. While it is important to distinguish between the (lost) church of the priory, and the (existing) parish church, the connection between the two sites may have its roots in pre-Conquest times.

The priory ruins have been known to county historians for centuries, but they became overgrown and neglected during the 20th century, standing in the grounds of a private residence where public access was discouraged. They have been the subject of various campaigns of investigation in recent years, and are now carefully preserved and remain in private ownership. A great deal of information about the priory's patrons, its charters, estates and temporalities, can be derived from the surviving Priory Cartulary, edited by Christopher Harper-Bill, and from related records.

A special aspect of the priory's topographical interest lies in its association with a far older phase of East Anglian history. For various reasons it is believed to have had a connection with the 7th century Anglo-Saxon King Anna of the East Angles (died A.D. 653 or 654), a Christian ruler who died defending his kingdom in battle. According to the 12th-century Liber Eliensis, Blythburgh was then believed to have been his burial place, and that of his son Jurmin.

== The seventh-century back story ==
Following the death of the powerful East Anglian King Raedwald, c. A.D. 624, his ascendancy over English rulers continued not with his East Anglian successors but with Edwin of Northumbria, whom Raedwald had assisted to the throne of York in 616. King Edwin's 626 conversion to Christianity and marriage to Princess Æthelburh of Kent set the stage for conflict between his dominion in eastern England and the opposing combined forces of the King of the Britons Cadwallon ap Cadfan and of King Penda, King of Mercia, a devotee of Woden.

Christianity in East Anglia took root under Sigeberht, Raedwald's stepson. Returning from exile in Gaul as a Christian, Sigeberht built schools and monasteries and settled Felix as his bishop at Dommoc, and Fursey, Irish monk and missionary, at Cnobheresburg. Sigeberht shared his rule with Ecgric, possibly a nephew of Raedwald's, but in time left power and entered his monastery of Beodricesworth. Penda invaded the kingdom, and both Sigebert and Ecgric were killed in the battle.

King Anna, a nephew of Raedwald's, next emerged as East Anglian ruler. He is described by Bede, writing about 80 years later, as a good and Christian king. He held the kingdom through the 640s, providing protection and baptism to King Coenwalh when he was driven out of Wessex by Penda, c. 645-48, and restoring Coenwalh to his throne. Around 651 Penda attacked East Anglia with an army. Anna, having won time for Fursey's monks to escape from their monastery to Gaul, was himself exiled, perhaps in Much Wenlock. Anna returned to his kingdom where in 654 Botolph, perhaps the former chaplain to two of Anna's religious daughters in Gaul, began building his monastic cell at Icanho, a location believed to have been at Iken beside, or upon, the inland estuary of the river Alde, not far from Rendlesham.

Penda attacked again, and in a great battle at Bulcamp fought in 653 or 654, Anna was slain, according to Bede. The account of this battle occurring at Blythburgh, where Anna died together with his son Jurmin, and of his burial nearby, appears in the Life of Etheldreda as found in the 12th-century Liber Eliensis. We learn much more about Anna's saintly daughters Seaxburga, Eorconberht's queen in Kent, and Etheldreda (St Audrey) of Ely, Ecgfrith's queen in Northumbria, who continued their religious work. After the death of Penda at the Battle at the river Winwaed near Leeds in 654, with Anna's brother Æthelhere of East Anglia at his side, the last brother Æthelwold inaugurated a more peaceful age in East Anglia. After 664 this was continued by his nephew King Ealdwulf of East Anglia. An accommodation with Mercia was reached by the conversion of Penda's son King Wulfhere and his marriage to Anna's granddaughter Eormenhild, daughter of Seaxburga.

== A royal vill ==
At the time of the Domesday Book in 1086, Blythburgh was a royal estate with two carucates of land and two other associated churches without lands of their own. Like other Domesday churches which had dependent daughter churches, which were associated with a substantial estate near royal lands, and which were located near the geographic or strategic centre of a Hundred, Blythburgh can be inferred to have been home to an earlier, pre-Norman minster church. It has therefore been thought likely that the canons took over the former parent church at the foundation of the priory and that Blythburgh parish church (Holy Trinity) and Walberswick church were probably the two dependent churches. These conclusions were dramatically reinforced by the dating of standing ruin of the south wall of the priory church to the 11th-12th centuries, older than the crossing and east works. This wall may well be part of the nave of an older parish church which preceded the foundation of the priory, or indeed part of the former minster church itself.

The Life of Saint Etheldreda (founder of the abbey of Ely), which forms part of the Liber Eliensis, reports that Anna’s and Jurmin’s remains had been buried at Blythburgh. This belief may predate the Conquest because the 12th-century Liber also tells that Jurmin’s body had been moved from Blythburgh, as a relic, to Bury St Edmunds. The story associating Anna's last battle with Blythburgh, therefore, was in existence early in medieval times. The place of the battle given by Bede as Bulcamp, if interpreted as being the place of that name on the northern bank of the river Blyth, opposite and slightly upstream of the parish church on a broad bluff overlooking the estuary, opened the surrounding landscape to a wider dramatic reading.

== The medieval foundation ==
=== Rise of canons regular ===
During the later 11th and early 12th centuries, Benedictine monasticism centred upon large religious communities in cities, with imposing buildings, powerful abbots and scholars, and considerable affluence. In contrast there arose a desire to follow a more primitive type of religious life, as canons regular in smaller, secluded communities. The Augustinian houses of canons began to be established on this principle.

The first house of canons regular in England was at St Botolph's Priory, Colchester, which was reorganized on a conventual basis before 1106. Around 1108, Holy Trinity Priory was founded with clergy from St Botolph’s, under the patronage of Queen Maud. Ten years later, Richard de Belmeis, Bishop of London, gave the church of Chich, Essex to the canons of Aldgate; presumably in support of his project, King Henry I granted the churches of Blythburgh and Stowmarket to him, and, it appears, to St Osgyth. By 1121, the canons of Aldgate had established the Priory of St Osyth at Chich. Its first prior William de Corbeil was advanced to the see of Canterbury in 1123, interrupting the Benedictine dominance of the English church.

=== The cell at Blythburgh ===
Although the exact arrival date of canons at Blythburgh is unknown, by 1147 a charter of King Stephen mentions two canons established there. The Ipswich house of canons at Holy Trinity Priory had been founded by 1133; Blythburgh probably remained only a cell of St Osyth's until King Henry II granted to the abbot of St Osyth's, c. 1164-1170, the right to appoint or remove the prior at Blythburgh, privileges later ratified by Pope Innocent III. Although paying an annual tribute to the mother house, the prior and convent of Blythburgh acted independently in the acquisition of lands. The Dunwich historian Gardner observes that priors of Blythburgh, being nominated by the abbot and convent of St Osyth's, were on every occasion presented to the Bishops of Norwich, for their institution, by the Lords of the Blything Hundred, successively the Claverings, Audleys, Uffords, and Lords Dacre, as patrons.

=== Competing foundations ===
The Cartulary's editor found no consistent pattern of patronage towards the priory. The many religious houses of the neighbourhood, including William de Chesney's Carthusian house at Sibton Abbey (c. 1149), the Cluniac house at Wangford (a cell of Thetford Priory), the many religious houses of Dunwich, and Roger fitzOsbert's Augustinian foundation at St. Olaves Priory, Herringfleet, were in competition to attract funding. In 1171 the Precentor of Blythburgh (whose office implies a fully organized community) was chosen to become the first prior of Ranulf de Glanvill's larger Augustinian house for 36 canons at Butley Priory (1171). Gilbert satisfied his very influential patrons: he continued at Butley until his death around 1195, playing his part in the exchange of endowments with Ranulph's Premonstratensian foundation at Leiston Abbey in 1183 (then located at Minsmere), assisting in the foundation of Leiston's daughter house at Langdon Abbey in Kent in 1192, and taking on the governance of Ranulf's leper hospital at West Somerton in Norfolk:

=== The lordship ===
The lordship of Blythburgh is traced from King Stephen's grant to John son of Robert de Chesney, and after his death to his brother William in 1157. Margaret de Chesney became William's senior heir in 1174: her first husband Hugh de Cressy dying in 1188/89, she remarried to Robert fitzRoger, lord of Warkworth, Northumberland. Robert was also lord of Horsford and of Langley, Norfolk, where he founded a Premonstratensian abbey in 1195/98. He died in 1214: Margaret secured her inheritance, and was succeeded at her death in 1230 by her son Roger de Cressi, and in 1246 by his son Hugh (II). Hugh and his brother Stephen both dying in 1263, Robert fitzRoger, a descendant of Margaret de Chesney's second marriage, became lord of Blythburgh until 1310, and in 1278 confirmed all the grants to the priory made by his predecessors. His son John fitzRobert, also called de Clavering, was lord of Blythburgh from 1310 to 1332, and was granted in Suffolk the Hundreds of Blything and Waineford in 1313, for life.

=== Spiritual holdings ===
The priory's chief spiritual holdings, apart from Blythburgh Holy Trinity and the chapel at Walberswick, were the churches or chapels lying immediately above Blythburgh along the tributary valleys of the Blyth. The earliest of these acquisitions were the churches of Bramfield, given by Eudo son of Oger de Bramfield, and Blyford, granted by members of the Criketot family. Both were confirmed to the priory by Bishop William de Turbeville (1146-1175). Wenhaston church was held as a moiety in 1281 (when confirmed by Archbishop Peckham), not including the chapel of Mells in the west. Its close neighbour, Thorington church (beside the Bramfield brook descending to the Blyth), the advowson of which was granted to the priory by the rector of St John of Dunwich, was appropriated in 1347. The church of Claxton, Norfolk, confirmed by William de Kerdeston, was evidently granted to Blythburgh in connection with fitzRoger's foundation at Langley Abbey in the adjoining parish.

=== Lands and rents ===
The priory drew its rents mainly within the Deanery of Dunwich, from a patchwork of mostly small endowments. Richard I's confirmation charter of 1198 begins with several in Dunwich itself: the Taxatio of 1291 shows that the priory received rents from the Dunwich churches of St Peter, St John, St Leonard (the lazar-house), St Nicholas, and All Saints. Dunwich received its charter and seal from King John in 1199 and again in 1215. Edward II Inspected and confirmed Richard's charter to the priory in 1319. It was inspected again in 1326, together with the priory's other lands and rents, in response to the prior's petition for a full new charter confirming the priory's holdings of old, which he requires because his franchises have been infringed by bailiffs and people of the country: this is the second Inspeximus, printed fully in the Monasticon. These, taken with the Cartulary and the Taxatio, reveal an expected concentration of holdings in Bulcamp and the neighbouring parishes of Blythford, Wenhaston, Holton St Peter, Henham, Sotherton and Westhall, in the Blyth hinterland.

To the west these extended around Halesworth, in the parishes of Heveningham and Huntingfield, Chediston, Linstead Magna, Brampton, and Spexhall: to the north they lay in the coastlands at Covehithe (North Hales), Frostenden, Reydon, Benacre and Easton Bavents. They continued into the Waineford Deanery to Willingham St Mary, Redisham, Ringsfield, Barsham, Shadingfield and Beccles, continuing also into Lothingland and across the Waveney into that corner of Norfolk, but avoiding that division of the Waineford Hundred known as The Saints. To the south they extended through the hinterland of Dunwich, including the manor of Hinton Hall which became a grange of the priory, and to Westleton, Darsham and Yoxford.

=== The priory church ===
The priory church of the Blessed Virgin Mary is represented by a few visible remains. It appears that in the 10th or 11th century there was a building (presumably a church) on this site, aligned ritually west to east but in fact somewhat north-west to south-east. The position of its western end is not known. A section of wall some 8.7 metres long and 3 metres high, forming part of the south side of the structure, remains standing. It has a flint rubble and lime mortar core, and was faced with neat horizontal courses of flint nodules with a decorative course of Roman tile, and two flint courses laid diagonally in herring-bone fashion. A surviving quoin is dressed with ashlars of Quarr stone, a non-local Oligocene limestone not found elsewhere on the site. It is believed that a corresponding wall stood about 8 metres to the north of this.

This building (or part thereof) was retained to serve as the nave (probably without aisles) of a new church built between circa A.D. 1190 and 1220, or thereabouts. The eastern end of the nave now opened into a central tower crossing supported on four large corner piers, one of which (the north-western) still survives as a rubble core to the height of some 7.7 metres. These piers form a square of almost 9 metres, from which there extended a presbytery or choir to the east, and large transepts to the north and south. The south transept was 12 metres in length (its south-western corner located by excavation), and a fragment of the east wall of the north transept is still standing. Little of the chancel remains, but a trench possibly representing the position of the east wall contained prepared flints suggesting a knapped flint facing and a rather extensive presbytery. A solitary coffined grave lay aligned on the central axis of the presbytery towards its eastern end, a ceremonial position for a burial of importance inside the church structure.

The ashlar cladding of the western piers, sufficiently preserved at the base for identification as of Norman-Early English Transitional style, show a curved plain facing on the west side over a basal plain roll moulding, with slender engaged shafts at the angles with the plain north and south faces. The ornamented western side of the piers is puzzling, since they must have abutted upon the older nave walls: yet it seems an opening was left at this point at ground level on both sides of the nave, maybe intending to demolish the old nave and build a new one with arcaded aisles (never undertaken). These openings must have given into a covered space, and doorways in the western walls of the transepts suggest outer structures (but not aisles) both north and south of the nave. If the antiquarian views tell us anything, it is that the walls of the crossing (and perhaps of the nave) rose fully to an upper register of fenestration.

On the north side of the nave the ground level was noticeably lower than the interior floor-level, and a flight of steps went down from the transept's west doorway into a walkway or ambulatory about 3 metres wide. This walk went along the outer side of the nave and the transept west wall, and was contained within a narrow wall, of which the stump of the south-eastern corner angle survives. This has been interpreted as meaning that the priory's cloister was (unusually) on the north side of the nave, where it would normally be in the corresponding position on the south. A large hole in the pier fabric suggests the fixing at this corner of a timber transom or tie beam to support the walkway roof structure. The surviving part of the south wall of the nave has no windows, making place for the outer structure inferred from the openings from the nave and the south transept. The prolonged evolution and development of this church, intended or actual, exceed what might be expected of a house of moderate wealth intended for only a few resident canons.

== Dissolution ==
At the Dissolution the inventory of the priory's goods was indented between the Commissioners (Thomas Rush, John Southwell and Thomas Mildmay) and prior John Ryton on 20 August 1536. The site and its dependent tithes, manors and rectories were granted in 28 Henry VIII (1536) to Walter Wadelond of Needham Market, and the reversion thereof was granted in 30 Henry VIII (1538) to Sir Arthur Hopton of Blythburgh and of Cockfield Hall, Yoxford, in tail male. The grant included "the site, with the church, steeple, and churchyard and the said closes, meadow, marsh, and water-mill, and the manors of Blitheborough, and Hynton Hall, Suffolk, belonging to the late priory, the rectories of the parish churches of Blitheborough, Thoryngton, Bramefeld, and Wenaston, the chapel of Walderswike, and a portion of tithes in Blifford, Suffolk, belonging the said late priory; and all messuages, etc., in the above places belonging to the said rectory and chapel, with reservation of advowsons of vicarages and free chapels."

The Hopton interest in Blythburgh was inherited from their ancestor Sir Robert de Swyllington (died 1391), a South Yorkshire dignitary who owned lands here. Their developing estates had devolved by entail upon John Hopton in 1430, who made his seat at the principal Blythburgh manor of Westwood Lodge, and developed the quay at Walberswick, becoming a wealthy and prominent landowner. He purchased the manors at Yoxford and Cockfield Hall which descended with Blythburgh through his heirs. John (who had no knighthood) died in 1478, having in 1451 received licence to establish the "Hopton Chaunterye" in Holy Trinity Church, Blythburgh, for the good estate of himself and for the soul of his late wife Margaret. This is identified with the Hopton chapel at the north-east corner of Blythburgh church, and with the table-tomb with canopy which opens between the chancel and the chapel. The slab which forms the lid of that tomb-chest is indented for three (lost) monumental brass figures, that is to say a central male figure in full armour with a wife at either side of him.

The Hoptons were therefore participants in and patrons of the pre-Reformation high medieval culture of the Blythburgh churches, though the patrons of the advowson of the parish church during the 15th century were the Fiennes, Lords Dacre. Sir William, John Hopton's son, was Treasurer to the Household of King Richard III, and Custos of Dunwich. Their presence continued as Lords of the manor for 60 years after the Dissolution. Sir Arthur Hopton (1488-1555) was Sir William's grandson, and the father of Sir Owen Hopton, Lieutenant of the Tower of London to Queen Elizabeth I. It was in 1577 that Blythburgh experienced the manifestation of the Black Hellhound in Holy Trinity church. When Sir Owen's son, the younger Arthur Hopton (died 1607) sold his estates including the Blythburgh manor at Westwood Lodge (towards Walberswick) to Robert Brooke and his father in 1597, it was not intended that the manors of Blythburgh former priory or Blythburgh rectory should be sold with them, and a prolonged lawsuit ensued.

== Rediscovery of the early past ==
Two sides of the Blythburgh writing tablet

The associations with King Anna were never fully forgotten, and continued to be repeated after the Reformation. John Leland (1503-1552) notices the battle and the burial: "King Anna was killed by Penda, king of the Mercians, in the 19th year of his reign but in anno Domini 654, and he is buried in the place which is called Blidesburg. There also his son Jurmin was buried..." Also in his Itinerary, of the founding of the priory, Leland remarks: "King Henry conveyed to the canons of St Osyth the churches of Stow and Blieb[u]rg, in which King Anna is said to rest buried." Leland's words imply that Anna was thought to rest there still.

John Weever, in his Ancient Funerall Monuments (1631), says: "This little Towne is memorable, for that Anna, King of the East Angles, together with his eldest sonne and heire apparent, Ferminus, were here buried, both slaine in a bloudie fierce battaile, by Penda the Mercian King, a Pagan". Since at least the middle of the 18th century a medieval tomb-chest in the parish church was habitually pointed out as his tomb, as piety gave way to curiosity. Hamlet Watling went to some trouble to trace off the windows during the 1840s and to produce images of them, speculating on their Anglo-Saxon themes.

A rare and highly suggestive discovery was made at the priory site many years ago. This was a bone plaque carved with Anglo-Saxon interlace decoration, forming one leaf of a folding writing-tablet recessed for wax, in the hollow of which are traces of runic inscriptions using Latin word forms. It confirms that there had been a literate presence at Blythburgh in the middle Anglo-Saxon period. It was taken into the British Museum collections in 1902.

In 1970, good examples found at the site of Ipswich Ware, a distinctive class of wheel-made pottery produced in Ipswich between the late 7th and mid 9th centuries, were shown to Norman Scarfe and Dr Stanley West, and identified by them. These were characteristic indicators of domestic occupation of East Anglian sites during the middle Anglo-Saxon period. An investigation in 2008 for Channel 4's Time Team archaeological programme identified burials dating from the mid-7th century in the area of the priory church nave, showing that the medieval priory and its predecessor structures occupied a site which had been in use for burials since the era in which King Anna himself had lived and died.

== Reinvestigation of the medieval ruins ==
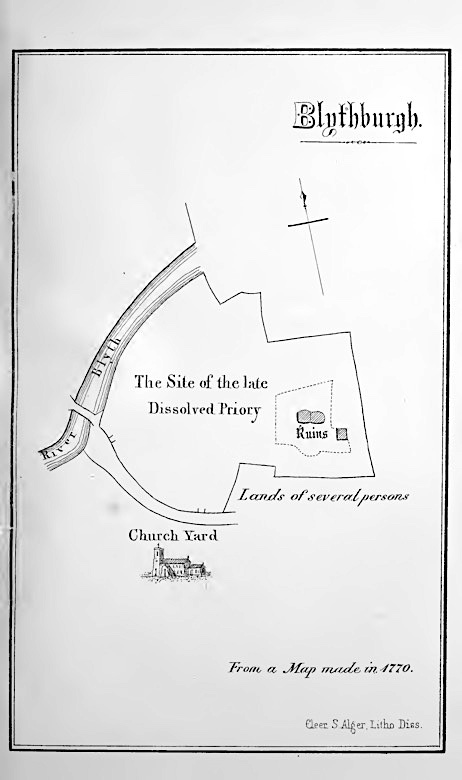
Plan of Blythburgh Priory, 1770, reproduced as a lithograph by Cleer Sewell Alger

"Considerable remains of this College now appear a little North-East of the church", wrote John Kirby in 1735: a small image on his accompanying Map of Suffolk shows the priory with a long standing wall pierced by an arcade of round arches (difficult to reconcile with surviving remains). An illustration of the priory by Francis Grose, engraved 1772, shows a large but incoherent mass of masonry, standing to a good height, with a number of round arches surviving and the remains of openings in the superstructure. Taylor, in his Index Monasticus of 1821, observes: "Some portion of the priory is yet standing about 150 yards to the north-east of the parochial church. A considerable quantity of the stone from the ruins was carried [off] to form the adjoining bridge and dam, about A.D. 1785." The engraving of a drawing by T. Higham, c. 1800, still shows two parallel sections of wall, probably of the priory church, with arched openings below and broken window embrasures above.

Hamlet Watling (1818-1908) drew partly on Suckling's account in his short note contributed after the visit of the Suffolk Institute of Archaeology to the priory during the early 1890s, observing:

"These once picturesque ruins suffered considerably about the year 1850 from the despoilers hands, as a great part of them were carted away to repair the roads etc. Excavations were made upon the site, and beneath the debris were discovered ancient coins, keys, Encaustic tiles bearing the signs of the Zodiac, etc., of great interest. These unfortunately passed into private hands; the landlord of the "White Hart Inn", who occupied the site at the time, disposed of them to the highest bidder. When visited in 1837 and 1840, some considerable portion of the ruins were then standing... By the appearance, when the debris was cleared away, it was a cross-aisled fabric... Some of its ornamentations were evidently Norman. During the excavations mentioned several human skeletons were found scattered upon the pavement of the Conventual Church, as if some resistance had been made by the inmates at the time of its suppression, and the buildings rased to the ground over their heads, and thus got entombed beneath the rubbish."

Following the Time Team investigation of 2008, since 2009 further, more prolonged and systematic campaigns of exploration and conservation, led by Stuart Boulter and Bob Carr of the Suffolk County Council Archaeological Service in connection with English Heritage and the owners of the site, have rediscovered the former remains of the large priory church with central crossing and transepts, and a cloister on the north side of the church. These works have permitted a much fuller understanding of the layout of the priory, while posing as many new questions as they have answered, and giving opportunity for the conservation of the ruins. The owners of the site, who have contributed to the costs of (and enthusiasm for) these campaigns, have created an informative website describing the journey of rediscovery of the remains and their investigation.
