= Hopton =

Hopton may refer to:

== Places in England ==
- Hopton, Derbyshire, a village and civil parish
  - Hopton Hall
- Hopton-on-Sea, Norfolk, a village and civil parish
- Hopton (by Nesscliffe), Shropshire, a hamlet in Great Ness parish
- Hopton Cangeford, Shropshire, a village and civil parish
- Hopton Castle and Hopton Castle (village), Shropshire
- Hopton Heath, Shropshire, a hamlet
- Hopton Wafers, Shropshire, a village and civil parish
- Hopton, Staffordshire, a village
- Hopton, Suffolk, a village and civil parish
- Upper Hopton, West Yorkshire, a village in Mirfield parish

== People with the surname ==
- Arthur Hopton (1488–1555), landowner, magistrate and MP for Suffolk
- Arthur Hopton (died 1607), of Witham, Somerset, MP for Dunwich and later for Suffolk
- Arthur Hopton (diplomat) (c.1588–1650), English diplomat who served as ambassador to Spain
- Charles Hopton (1861–1946), Anglican priest, Archdeacon of Birmingham
- David Hopton (died 1492), Anglican priest, canon of Windsor
- Edward Hopton (1837–1912), British Army officer, Lieutenant Governor of Jersey
- Ineta Hopton (née Mackeviča; born 1992), Latvian professional squash player
- Jessica Hopton (born 1996), English badminton player
- John Hopton (died 1558), Roman Catholic Bishop of Norwich
- John Hopton (died 1478) (c.1405–1478), landowner and administrator, Sheriff of Suffolk
- John Hopton (naval administrator) (c.1470–1524), English naval officer and naval administrator
- John Hopton (soldier) (1858–1934), British soldier, landowner, musician, and Olympic marksman
- Michael Hopton (died 1601), English knight, builder of the original Canon Frome House
- Nicholas Hopton (born 1965), British diplomat
- Owen Hopton (c.1519–1595), Lieutenant of the Tower of London
- Ralph Hopton (died 1571), Knight Marshal of the Household
- Ralph Hopton, 1st Baron Hopton (1596–1652), Royalist commander in English Civil War
- Robert Hopton (died 1590), Marshal of the Household, MP for Mitchell
- Robert Hopton (died 1638) (c.1575–1638), Suffolk landowner, MP for Shaftesbury and later for Somerset
- Russell Hopton (1900–1945), American film actor and director
- Susanna Hopton (1627–1709), English devotional writer

== People with the given name ==
- Hopton Haynes (1667–1749), English employee of the Royal Mint and theological writer
