= Barmby =

Barmby may refer to:

People:

- Catherine Barmby (1816/17 – 1853), utopian socialist and writer on women's emancipation
- Francis Barmby (1863–1936), English cricketer
- Jack Barmby (born 1994), English professional footballer
- Jeff Barmby (1943–2021), English footballer
- John Goodwyn Barmby (1820–1881), British Victorian utopian socialist
- Nick Barmby (born 1974), English professional footballer, former manager of Football League Championship club Hull City

Geography:

- Barmby on the Marsh, village and civil parish in the East Riding of Yorkshire, England
- Barmby Moor, village and civil parish in the East Riding of Yorkshire, England
- Barmby railway station, station on the Hull and Barnsley Railway, serving Barmby on the Marsh

== See also ==
- Barby (disambiguation)
- Barmy
