= Arthur Hopton (1488–1555) =

English knight, landowner, magistrate and Member of Parliament

Sir Arthur Hopton (1488–15/16 August 1555) of Cockfield Hall in Yoxford, Suffolk was an English knight, landowner, magistrate, and Member of Parliament.

== The Hoptons at Blythburgh and Yoxford ==
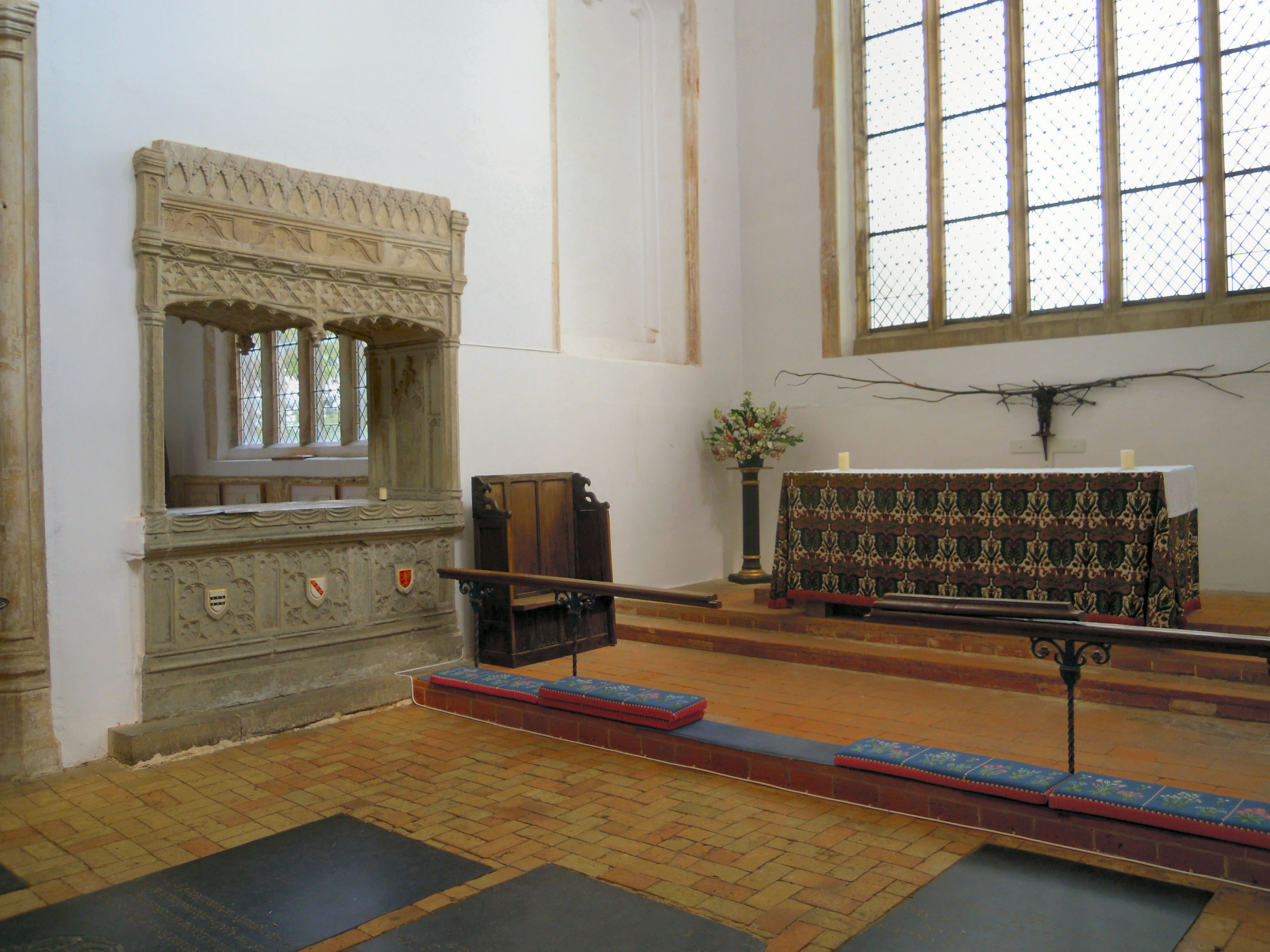
John Hopton's tomb at Blythburgh, looking through to the Hopton chapel

John Hopton (c. 1405–1478), Sir Arthur's great-grandfather, was of Yorkshire background. His father Thomas was the acknowledged natural son of Sir Robert de Swyllington (died 1391), of Swillington in Yorkshire (between Temple Newsam and Methley, south-east of Leeds), who also held lands around Blythburgh in Suffolk. Sir Robert's son Sir Roger (died 1417) developed his Suffolk holdings: when, in 1428, after a series of deaths, Sir Robert was shown to have entailed his estates upon Thomas Hopton and his heirs, the Yorkshire and Suffolk estates descended around 1430 to John Hopton.

John purchased Cockfield Hall at Yoxford from Sir John Fastolf in 1440, but had for his principal residence the manor of Westwood at Blythburgh, midway between Blythburgh village and Priory and his quay at Walberswick. John (who is buried in the Hopton chantry in Blythburgh parish church) became fully established in Suffolk, and was, by his last wife Thomasine Barrington, father of Sir William Hopton, his principal heir. William Hopton, Custos of Dunwich and Treasurer of the Household to King Richard III, was knighted by King Richard on the day before his coronation in 1483. William married Margaret Wentworth, daughter and heir of Sir Roger Wentworth of Nettlestead, Suffolk by his wife Margery le Despenser, and they were the parents of Sir George Hopton: Sir William died in 1484.

== Arthur Hopton and his inheritance ==
Sir George (knighted in 1487) married Anne Sotehill of Stockerston, Leicestershire, but died aged 29 in 1490, very soon followed by his elder son John, a child. Thereupon George's second son, Arthur Hopton, an infant, became his father's heir in the manors of Westleton, Westhall, Thorington and Easton Bavents, and his brother's heir in the manor of Blythburgh, 'otherwise called West Woode', with its members and hamlets, in 1490, which was at first the headmanor. Furthermore at the death of his great-grandmother Thomasine in 1498, Arthur also became heir to the manors of Wissett and Wissett Roos, Yoxford and Stikland, Brentfen and Middleton, and of Mourelles, though not yet of age to take possession.

Arthur's mother Anne remarried in 1498 to Sir Robert, Lord Curson, who at once entered Hopton's manor of Westleton forcibly, claiming it should belong to Anne during her lifetime. Sir George Hopton had left the child in the wardship of four trusted friends, and his executors Sir Robert Clere (c.1453–1529, of Ormesby St. Margaret, Norfolk) and William Eyre became engaged in lengthy Star Chamber proceedings for the recovery of Arthur's rights. It was then about a decade later that he made his first marriage, to Maud, daughter of Sir Robert Dymoke of Scrivelsby (died 1546). Sir Robert had been knighted on the same occasion as Arthur's grandfather Sir William Hopton, and Robert's maternal grandparents Lionel Welles, 6th Baron Welles and Joan Waterton lay in a fine tomb at Methley, beside Swillington. Sir Robert Dymoke was King's Champion at the Coronations of Kings Richard III, Henry VII, and Henry VIII.

This marriage, however, although socially advantageous, produced no surviving children, and by 1518 Arthur Hopton had taken a second wife. The match was no less ambitious, his choice falling upon Anne, daughter of Sir Davy Owen of Cowdray House at Midhurst in West Sussex, a natural son of Sir Owen Tudor (and therefore uncle to King Henry VII). Sir David Owen refers to "my daughter Anne Hopton" in his will. From this marriage came all of Sir Arthur's offspring, including five or six sons and four daughters, his eldest son and heir Owen (the future Sir Owen Hopton) being born c. 1519.

== Service ==
Arthur served in the French campaign of 1513 and was knighted for his bravery after the Battle of the Spurs. He was appointed to the commission for the peace in Suffolk in 1514 and remained on the bench for the rest of his life. He appears as one of the "Knights for the Body" in the royal household in 1516. He went with Henry VIII and other knights to Henry's meeting with Francis I of France at the Field of Cloth of Gold in 1520. He was also present at the reception of Charles V in 1522, and attended the coronation of Anne Boleyn in 1533. In 1536 he was summoned to the King's service with 100 men to suppress the Pilgrimage of Grace, and was taken with Sir Anthony Wingfield and Sir Thomas Tyrrell out of Suffolk in the company of Charles Brandon, Duke of Suffolk: with Wingfield and Sir John Candysshe he sent letters of information to the Duke from Barton-upon-Humber in November. He sat upon juries for the trial of the rebels. He attended the christening of Prince Edward in 1537. He was appointed to attend Anne of Cleves in 1539. He was a knight of the shire for Suffolk in 1539, and again in 1542, probably on both occasions with Sir Anthony Wingfield.

== Building at Yoxford and Blythburgh ==
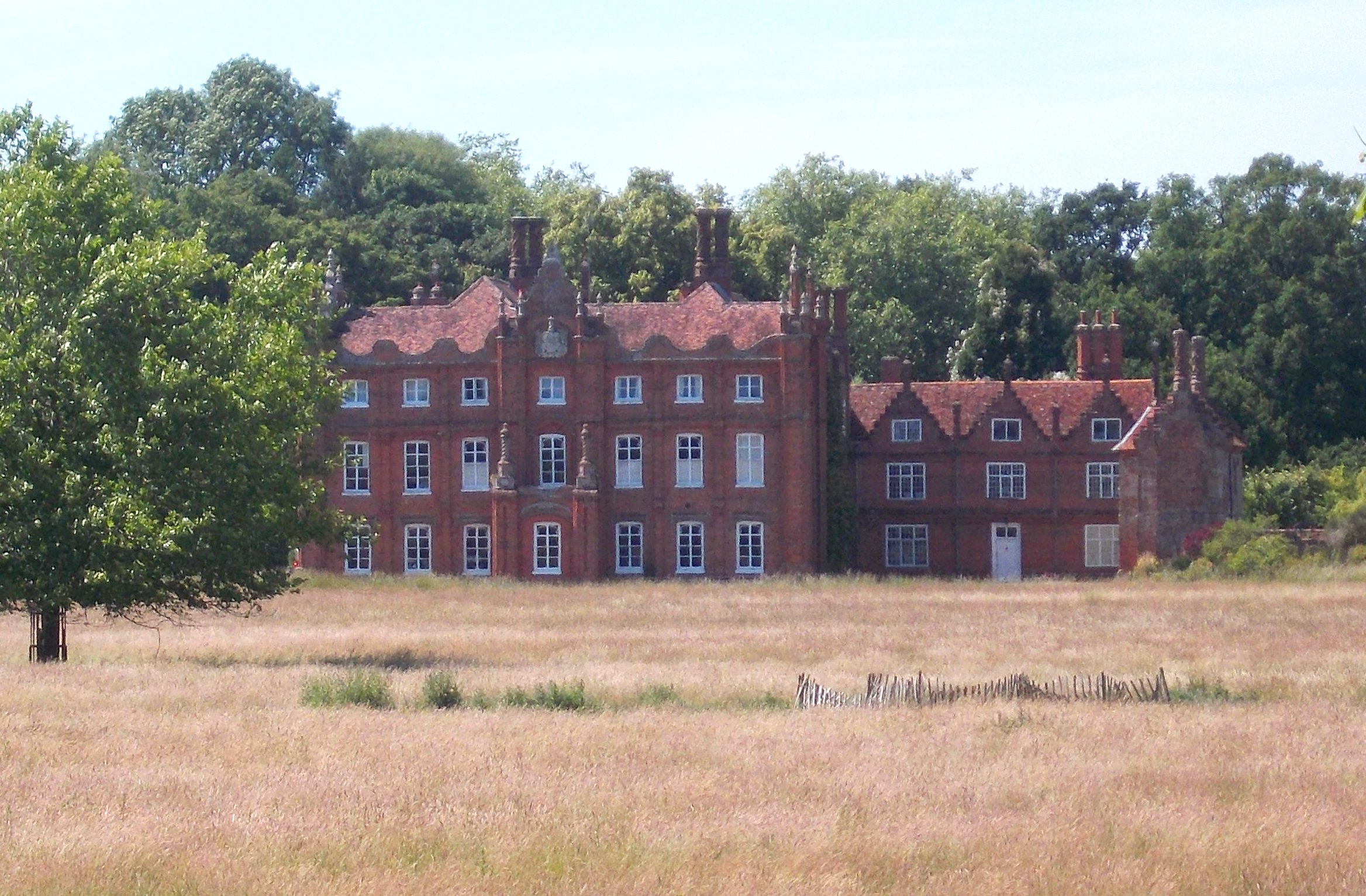
Cockfield Hall, Yoxford, showing the surviving Tudor work in the north wing

Sir Arthur is thought to have built Cockfield Hall at Yoxford in its Tudor brick form, including the part now forming the north wing of the later mansion, and the Gatehouse. This work may date to around 1520, since he was still principally resident in Blythburgh in 1524. The brick hall and farmstead of his principal manor of Westwood, known as Westwood or Blythburgh Lodge, which was also probably built in his time (but much modified since), stands south-east of the village on rising land facing south over water-meadows and pastures towards the Dunwich river.

The reversion of the house and site of Blythburgh Priory was granted to him in tail male in November 1538, with marsh and watermill and various closes, together with the manors of Blythburgh and Hinton Hall belonging to the priory, and with the parish rectories of Blythburgh, Bramfield, Thorington and Wenhaston, the chapelry of Walberswick, and all messuages in those places belonging to them, excepting the advowsons. Soon after this, in 1541 he disposed of his family manor of Swillington in Yorkshire, together with 60 messuages and two watermills and sundry lands, to Edward North, Esq., and two years later joined Sir Edward in conveying them together with lands in other Yorkshire parishes to Sir George Darcy (son of the attainted Lord Darcy, former owner of Temple Newsam), with the assistance of his son and heir apparent Owen Hopton, Esq. Owen Hopton received a settlement of Blythburgh and other manors at the time of his marriage in 1542 to Anne, daughter of Sir Edward Echyngham of Barsham, Suffolk.

Charles Brandon, Duke of Suffolk was in possession of the manor of Henham (formerly property of the de la Pole Dukes of Suffolk) in 1538 when he sold it with other lands nearby to the King. He had built there a Tudor mansion of red brick. In April 1545 the king's Court of Augmentations granted the bailiwick and keeping of the manor-place, garden and orchard of his manor of Henham to trustees who vested it in Sir Arthur Hopton. The Hall itself was granted by the king to Sir Anthony Rous of Dennington in his demesne as of fee. Sir Arthur therefore conveyed the bailiwick to Sir Anthony in November 1545, by an indenture preserved among the Earl of Stradbroke's muniments. The Tudor mansion was destroyed by fire in 1773.

== Family ==
Sir Arthur married first, but without issue, to Maud, daughter of Sir Robert Dymoke (died 1546) of Scrivelsby, Lincolnshire.

Sir Arthur married secondly (by 1518) Anne, daughter of Sir David Owen of Cowdray House at Midhurst in West Sussex. Their children included:

Sons

- (Sir) Owen Hopton, Lieutenant of the Tower of London, who married Anne, elder daughter of Sir Edward Echyngham of Barsham, Suffolk.
- Robert Hopton (died 1590), Marshal of the Household, 1560–1577, at first jointly with Sir Ralph Hopton (died 1571), his kinsman by marriage. Married Dorothy Pakenham.
- Thomas Hopton
- Charles Hopton, who in 1575 was granted a lifetime annuity of £13.6s.8d out of the manor of Blythburgh late Priory by his brother Owen.
- John Hopton
  - Ralph Hopton (died 1571) was the son of an unidentified Hopton and Agnes Haines. He is sometimes listed as a brother or half-brother of Sir Owen. That attribution is however doubtful: the relationship was that his niece Rachel Hall became his heir on condition that she marry a Hopton, and she married Sir Arthur Hopton (died 1607), son of Owen Hopton.

Daughters

- Frances Hopton, married (1) ---- Jermy, and (2) Sir Thomas Nevill (of Yorkshire); she married (3) Richard Hovell of Rishangles.
- Mary Hopton, married (1) Richard Gorney, of Cory Malet, Somerset, and (2) William Butler (of Somerset)
- Margaret Hopton, married (1) Anthony Cokett, of Sibton, Suffolk and North Mimms, Hertfordshire, and (2) Arthur Robsert, natural son of Sir John Robsart of Wymondham and Syderstone, Norfolk, and half-brother of Amy Robsart.
- Dorothy Hopton, married ---- Berrye, of Norwich, mother of Sir Benjamin Berrye (Deputy Governor of Portsmouth).
