= Arthur Hopton =

Arthur Hopton may refer to:

- Sir Arthur Hopton (1488–1555), English politician
- Arthur Hopton (died 1607), English politician
- Sir Arthur Hopton (diplomat) (1588?–1650), English diplomat who served as ambassador to Spain
