= John Hopton (died 1478) =

English landowner and administrator

John Hopton (about 1405–1478) was an English landowner and administrator with estates in Suffolk and Yorkshire who was active in local government during the reigns of King Henry VI and King Edward IV.

== Origins ==
John Hopton was a son of Thomas Hopton (died before 1428) and his wife Margaret, daughter of William Pert of Terrington and his wife Joan Scrope. His father was the illegitimate child of Joan Hopton (from a gentry family with lands near Swillington, Yorkshire) and Sir Robert Swillington, Chamberlain of the Household to John of Gaunt. Sir Robert Swillington made his home in his wife's family estate of Kirby Bellars in Leicestershire, where he died in 1391 and was buried in the priory there. His son Roger Swillington inherited the estate, but Sir Robert's will also left 20 pounds to his illegitimate son Thomas Hopton. Sir Robert had previously given lands in Blythburgh, Suffolk, to Blythburgh Priory. An earlier Robert Swillington had acquired two parts (and the reversion of the third part) of the Suffolk manors of Yoxford, Middleton and Burgh.

=== How the estate came to John Hopton ===
Roger Swillington, dying in 1417, made bequests to Blythburgh and its priory, and gave books including graduals and antiphonaries to Blythburgh and Walberswick parish churches. His son John died in the following year, and his sister Margaret (wife of Sir John Gra of South Ingleby) was found to be next heir: but she died without issue in 1419 and, since Thomas Hopton had by then also died, the estates passed to Elizabeth, daughter of Thomas Swillington and wife of Robert Sampson of Playford, near Ipswich. It was not until the death of Roger Swillington's second wife Joan, who had a life-tenure), in about 1428 that Richard Danyell, parson of Swillington (executor of Roger Swillington), made a declaration that Sir Roger had entailed his estates upon Thomas Hopton and his heirs; further, a release of the manor of Wissett to Sir John and Lady Gra had been forged "by certain children of iniquity" in his name, and that no such release (nor of any other lands) had been made.

Robert Sampson and Elizabeth his wife at once (1428) released all their rights in the manors of Ditchingham (Pirnhow) and Ellingham (in Norfolk), and of Blythburgh, Westleton, Claydon, Thorington, Westhall, Yoxford and others (in Suffolk), and all the lands late Sir Robert Swillington's, to John Hopton, Esq., and his heirs. Consequently, in 1430-1431 the king ordered the Sheriff of Norfolk to deliver seisin to John. Robert Sampson, tailor of Halesworth, quitclaimed a very extensive list of manors and other holdings to John Hopton, a full release being made to John 9 years later by Sir John Gra of all his right in the Yorkshire, Nottinghamshire, Leicestershire and Derbyshire manors, similarly acknowledged by Elizabeth Whitfield, relict of Robert Sampson, and by Sir John again (including the Suffolk manors) in 1435.

== Career ==
The young John had no particular prospects until this series of deaths left him in 1430, aged about 25, owner of many valuable holdings inherited from his grandfather. Among them were the lands of Swillington outside Leeds, and also several manors centred upon the estate or headmanor of Westwood at Blythburgh, standing on a ridge towards Walberswick and facing south-east towards the now lost city of Dunwich, which was then still of some importance. He made Westwood his home for the rest of his life, adding to his Suffolk holdings by the purchase of two further estates. One was Cockfield Hall in Yoxford, which he bought from Sir John Fastolf in 1440, and the other was Easton Bavents, just north of Southwold (and mostly now vanished under the sea), from Ela, widow of Sir Robert Shardlow.

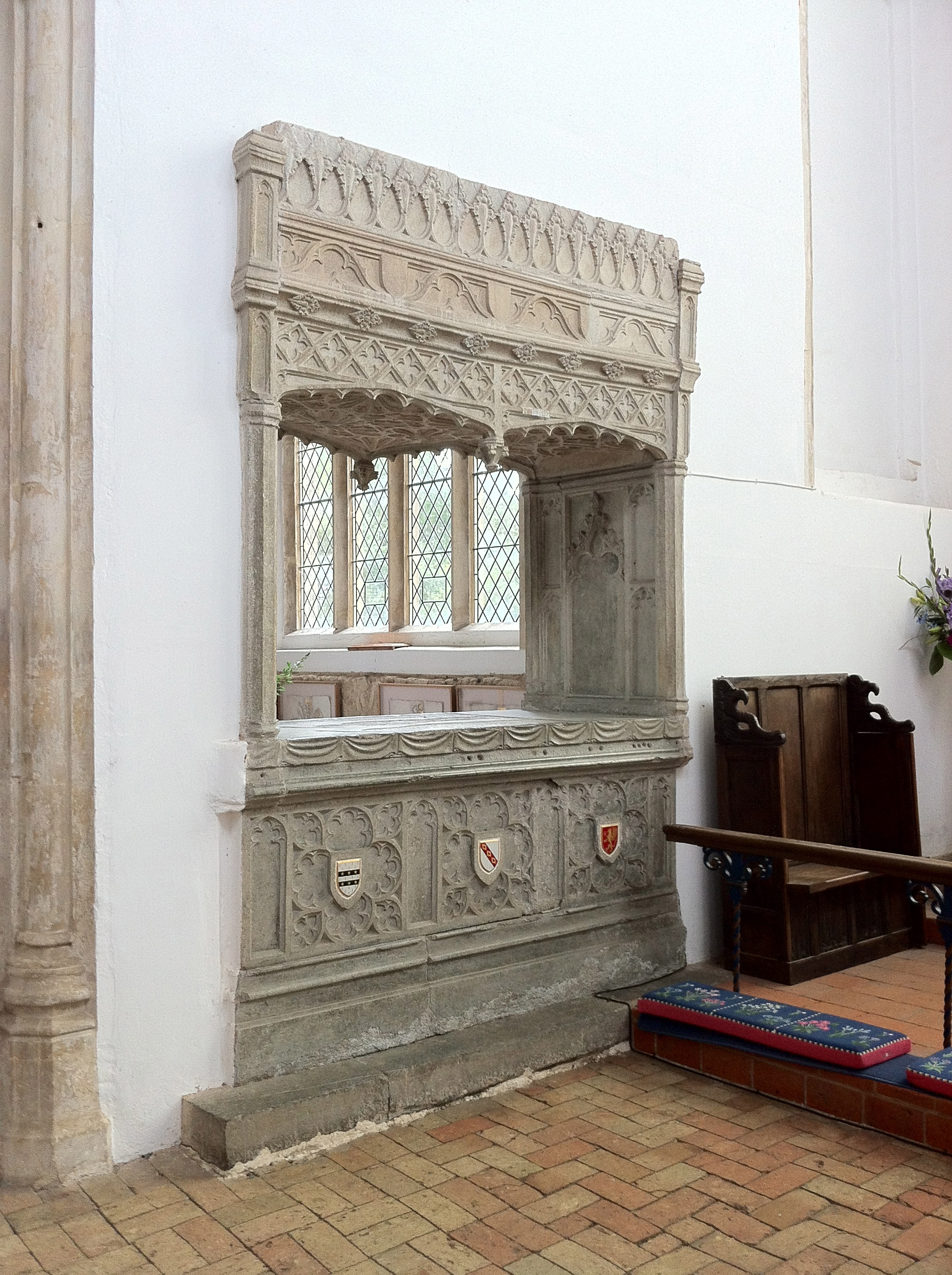
The tomb by the high altar in Holy Trinity Church, Blythburgh

Between the late 1430s and around 1450 he as lord of Blythburgh stood up for its Liberties against the authorities at Dunwich, refusing to pay their dues for stallage and for shipping, or to use their measures, and often obliging the Dunwich shipping to use the key at Walberswick. Early in his time in Suffolk he was chosen as sheriff for the county in 1436–7 and later served another term in 1444–5. From that year he also sat on the commission of the peace, leaving the bench in 1458 but being reappointed from 1461 until 1468, when the loss of his sight made him unable to continue. While his eldest son became Sir William, he himself refused a knighthood. His will has not survived, though he is known to have made one, and in 1478 he was buried beside his first wife in Holy Trinity Church, Blythburgh.

== Family ==
In 1427 he married Margaret, daughter of Sir Thomas Savile of Thornhill and his wife Margaret, daughter of Sir John Pilkington, with whom he had four sons and three daughters. The girls all married landowners, for example Elizabeth who married Sir William Brewes of Stinton Hall in Salle. After Margaret died in 1451, he founded a chantry for her in Blythburgh church and set up a tomb there for her and himself.

Sources vary over his next marriage, some saying that between 1451 and 1457 he married and lost Agnes Heveningham. Two memorials formerly at Walberswick church may have been for himself with these deceased wives.

Certainly in 1457 he married Thomasine, daughter of John Barrington of Rayleigh and his wife Isabel. She was the widow of two previous husbands, William Lunsford of Battle and William Sidney of Stoke d'Abernon, and already had seven children. Together she and John had two sons, and she long outlived him, being buried near him in Blythburgh church in 1498. The slab which forms the table or cover of the Blythburgh tomb-chest opening between the chancel and the north-side chancel aisle is indented for three (lost) monumental brass figures, that is to say a central male figure in armour with a wife at either side of him - Margaret and Thomasine.

He was the great-grandfather of Sir Arthur Hopton (1488-1555).

== Bibliography ==
- Richmond, Colin. John Hopton: A Fifteenth Century Suffolk Gentleman; Cambridge University Press, 2005. (Google preview, 1981 edition)
