= Robert Hopton =

Robert Hopton may refer to:

- Robert Hopton (died 1638), English politician, MP for Shaftesbury, and for Somerset
- Robert Hopton (died 1590), MP for Mitchell
- Robert Hopton (MP for Wallingford), see Wallingford (UK Parliament constituency)
