= Anthony Cokett =

English politician

Anthony Cokett (before 1517 - 1561) was an English politician. He was a member of parliament (MP) for Melcombe Regis in 1545, alongside Thomas Poley.

Anthony was the eldest son of Edward Cokett and Anna Froxmere of Appleton, Norfolk. He married Margaret, the daughter of Arthur Hopton and thus was brother in law to Owen Hopton. He had a son, Arthur by Anna.
