= Beatrice Barmby =

English author, translator and Old Norse scholar (1868–1899)

- Born: Beatrice Helen Barmby; 3 July 1868; Wakefield, Yorkshire, England
- Died: 9 January 1899 (aged 30); Salcombe Regis, Devon, England
- Father: Goodwyn Barmby

Beatrice Helen Barmby (3 July 1868 – 9 January 1899) was an English author, poet, translator and scholar of Old Norse, who wrote English-language adaptations of Old Norse literature. Her works include the play Gísli súrsson: a Drama and poetry based on Laxdæla saga and The Waking of Angantýr.

== Biography ==
Barmby was born on 3 July 1868 in Wakefield, Yorkshire to Goodwyn Barmby, a Unitarian minister, charitst, and socialist writer, and Ada Marianne (née Shepherd; 1832–1911), a suffragist. The younger sister of Mabel Katharine Barmby (1865–1945), Barmby had two older half-siblings from her father's first marriage to Catherine Isabella Barmby. Raised in an Unitarian household, the family moved to the village of Yoxford following her father's retirement in 1879. Sometime after her father's death in 1881, Barmby moved to Mount Pleasant in Salcombe Hill with her mother, sister and half sister. Barmby is thought to have been in bad health throughout her life, and became disabled during her childhood following a back injury. Listed as a scholar in the 1881 census, it's unclear if Barmby was educated at home or if she attended school like her sister Mabel.

Barmby studied Icelandic with the scholar Eiríkur Magnússon and produced translations of, and poetry based on, Old Norse literature. All her works were published posthumously by her sister Mabel. Her play based on Gísla saga, which was praised for its grasp of the Norse spirit, was read by the Viking Society in 1903 and translated into Icelandic by Matthías Jochumsson in 1902.

== Publications ==
- Gísli Súrsson: A Drama. Ballads and Poems of the Old Norse Days and Some Translations (1900)
- Rosslyn’s Raid and Other Tales (short story collection, 1903)
- Poems (1903)
- "The Lay of Thrym" (translation of the poem Þrymskviða, published in Saga-Book of the Viking Club 3, 1903)
- The Gods are Just. Duckworth & Company. 1904.; novel
