= Colin Richmond =

British historian (born 1937)

Colin F. Richmond (born 1937) is a British historian of late medieval England. After degrees from the University of Leicester and the University of Oxford, he spent his entire career teaching at Keele University, rising to become Professor of Medieval History.

== Early life and education ==
Richmond studied at Chislehurst and Sidcup Grammar School before receiving his undergraduate degree from the University of Leicester in 1959. He then began graduate study at the University of Oxford under the supervision of K.B. McFarlane. In 1963, he was awarded a Doctor of Philosophy (DPhil) degree for a thesis entitled "Royal Administration and the Keeping of the Seas, 1422-1485".

== Academic career ==
After completing his doctorate, Richmond took up a teaching post at Keele University, where he spent the remainder of his career. He was appointed Professor of Medieval History in 1993. He retired from full-time academia in 1997, and was appointed professor emeritus.

He has published a number of monographs, scholarly articles and book chapters on medieval history and the Holocaust, notable for their maverick style. He has also published a range of spoof articles in legitimate academic journals, collected in The Penket Papers and Other Stories (1986) and Fabrications: The Adventures of Anthony Woodville, 2 vols. (self-published, 2016). In 2005, he was the recipient of a festschrift edited by Margaret Aston and Rosemary Horrox, entitled Much Heaving and Shoving: Late-Medieval Gentry and their Concerns: Essays for Colin Richmond.

== Notable Quotations ==
- "The analytical spirit obstructs enjoyment" (The Paston Family in the Fifteenth Century: The First Phase, p. ix)

== Selected works ==
- John Hopton: A Fifteenth Century Suffolk Gentleman (Cambridge: Cambridge University Press, 1981).
- The Penket Papers and Other Stories (Gloucester: Sutton, 1986).
- The Paston Family in the Fifteenth Century: The First Phase (Cambridge: Cambridge University Press, 1990).
- The Paston Family in the Fifteenth Century: Fastolf's Will (Cambridge: Cambridge University Press, 1996).
- The Paston Family in the Fifteenth Century: Endings (Manchester: Manchester University Press, 2001).
- Colin Richmond (1992). "Englishness and Medieval Anglo-Jewry". In Kushner, Tony (ed.). The Jewish Heritage in British History. Frank Cass. pp. 42–59. ISBN 0-7146-3464-6.
