= New Moral World =

- Founder: Robert Owen
- Founded: 1834
- Ceased publication: 1845

The New Moral World was an early socialist newspaper in the United Kingdom, once the national official publication of Owenism.

The publication was launched by Robert Owen in November 1834 as the successor to Crisis, and carried the subtitle "A London Weekly Publication. Developing the Principles of the Rational System of Society". Later subtitles included "Manual of Science" and "Gazette of the Universal Community Society of Rational Religionists", while the paper briefly had an alternative title of Millennium.

Following closely the development of Owen's ideas, the newspaper initially advocated general unionism and peaceful revolution, but soon moved to instead advocate the formation of utopian communities. It did this through a mixture of news, comment, letters, poetry, and the publication of policy.

Unlike Crisis, New Moral World was largely sold rather than given away, and therefore had a smaller circulation. The newsagents who sold it typically also sold the Chartist Northern Star. Initially published in London, publication moved to Manchester, Birmingham, then in 1839 to Leeds, where its publication was arranged by Joshua Hobson. In 1842, publication moved back to London, then in 1845 to Harmony Hall in Hampshire. This colony soon collapsed, and Owen sold the newspaper to James Hill, father of Octavia Hill. George Fleming attempted to relaunch the paper as Moral World, but both the original and relaunched versions of the paper had stopped publication by the end of the year.

== Editors ==
1834: Robert Owen
1837: George Fleming
1845: James Hill

== Writers ==
- Catherine Isabella Barmby
