= Middleton, Suffolk =

Village in Suffolk, England

Coordinates: 52.254807°N 1.558503°E

Middleton
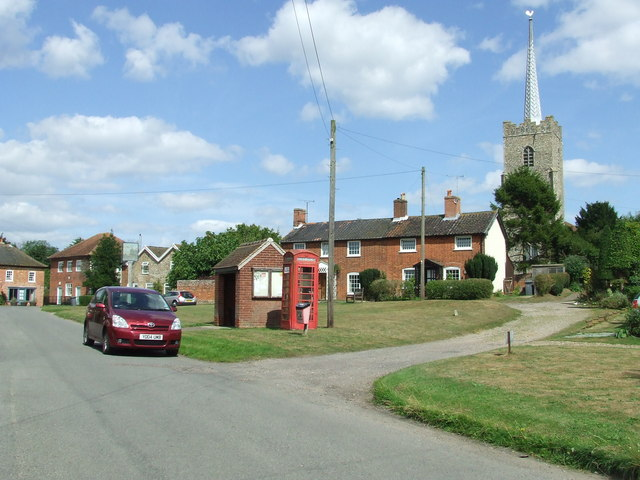
- Middleton Village

- Location within Suffolk
- Population: 343 (2011)
- Shire county: Suffolk
- Region: East
- Country: England
- Sovereign state: United Kingdom
- Post town: Saxmundham
- Postcode district: IP17

Middleton is a village in the east of the English county of Suffolk. It is located approximately 3 miles (5 km) north-west of Leiston, 5 miles (8 km) north east of Saxmundham and 3 miles (5 km) from the Suffolk coast. The village is on the B1122 around 2 miles (3 km) east of Yoxford and had a population of 359 at the 2001 census, falling to 343 at the 2011 Census.

The parish church is dedicated to the Holy Trinity. The village has one pub, the Bell Inn owned by Adnams Brewery, and until the last decade the village had a post office. The nearest post office now is located in the village of Westleton. There is also a park and a yearly village fête.

Middleton Primary School currently caters for children aged 5 to 11 years old, and works in partnership with Yoxford & Peasenhall Primary School in Yoxford and Southwold Primary School in Southwold. The three schools make up the Yoxford Valley Partnership of Schools.

Translator Michael Hamburger lived in the village until his death in 2007.
