= Knight Marshal =

Office in the British Royal Household, 1236–1846

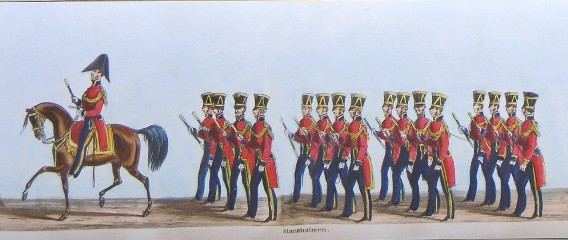
The Knight Marshal accompanied by his Marshalmen in the Coronation Procession of Queen Victoria, 1838.

The Knight Marshal is a former office in the British Royal Household established by Henry III in 1236. The position later became a Deputy to the Earl Marshal from the reign of Henry VIII until the office was abolished in 1846.

The Knight Marshal and his men were responsible for maintaining order within the King's Court (Court of Marshalsea or Palace Court) which was abolished in 1849.

According to The Present State of the British Court, published in 1720,

"The Knight Marshal is an Officer employ'd in the King's Court or Marshalsea, and the Marshal's Men under him are properly the King's Bailiffs. They arrest in the Verge of the Court {i.e. within a 12 mile radius of the Sovereign's palace} when a Warrant is back'd by the Board of Green-cloth. The Knight Marshal and his Men have place in all publick Cavalcades, at Declaring of War, Proclaiming Peace, publick Entries and Processions made by the Soveraign."

The Knight Marshal was appointed by the Crown for life by letters patent under the great seal frequently in the form of grants in reversion. Board wages were fixed at £21 5s 10d in 1662. In 1685, a salary of £26 was provided. This was raised to £500 in 1790 but reduced to £271 in 1816.

The separate office of Knight Marischal exists in the Royal Household of Scotland, but has not been filled since 1863.

== List of knights marshal ==
- temp Henry IV : Sir Robert Whitney, killed at the Battle of Pilleth in 1402
- temp Richard III : William Brandon
- temp Edward IV : Sir Ralph Assheton
- temp Henry VII : Sir John Digby
- temp Henry VIII : Sir William Pickering
- 1542 26 August – 1556 : Sir Ralph Hopton (died 1571)
- 1555 : Sir Anthony Kingston (died 1556)
- 1556 May – 1558 : Sir Thomas Holcroft
- 1558 Mar – 1558 : Sir Thomas Hervey
- 1558 21 Dec – 1571 : Sir Ralph Hopton and Robert Hopton (jointly)
- 1571 - 1577: Robert Hopton (alone)
- 1578: Sir George Carey
- 1597 May : Sir Thomas Gerard (created Baron Gerard, 1603)
- 1604 – 1618 :Sir Thomas Vavasour
- 1618 – 1626 : Sir Edward Zouch
- 1626 – 1642 : Sir Edmund Verney
- c.1642 : Sir Edward Sydenham
- ?1651 : Sir Robert Throckmorton, 1st Baronet
- 1649 – 1660 : Interregnum
- 1660 11 July : Sir William Throckmorton
- 1667 22 April : Sir Edmund Wyndham
- 1681 3 March – ?1689 : Sir Edward Villiers
- 1689 4 July : Sir Edward Villiers (died 1711)
- 1700 11 July – 1757 : Sir Philip Meadows
- 1757 5 December – 1792 : Sir Sydney Meadows
- 1792 15 November – 1795 : Hugh Boscawen
- 1795 10 November – 1824 : Sir James Lamb, 1st Baronet
- 1824 11 October – 1846 : Sir Charles Lamb, 2nd Baronet
- 1846 Post abolished

== H.M.'s Marshalmen ==
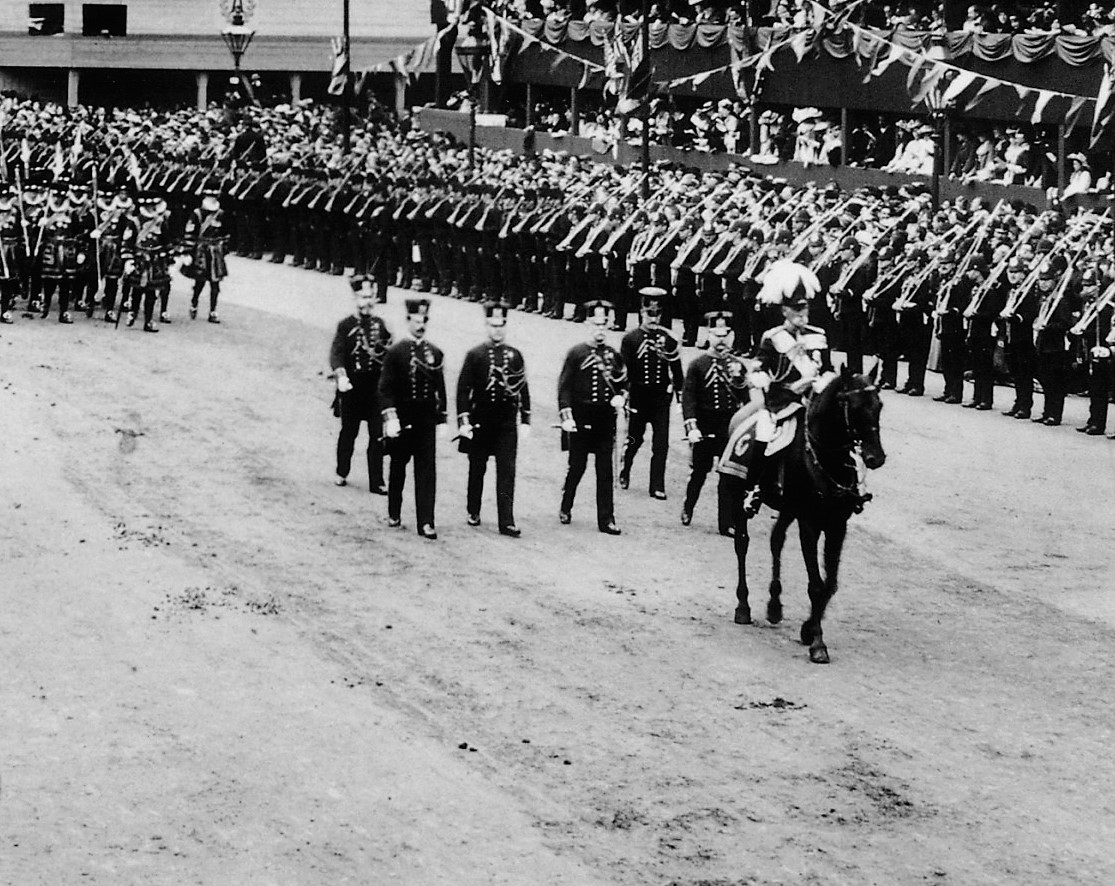
Six King's Marshalmen following the Commander-in-Chief, Field Marshal Earl Roberts, in Edward VII's Coronation Procession, 9 August 1902

A token number of Marshalmen continued to be appointed even after the demise of the Marshalsea Court; they became honorary appointments within the Royal Household and were in attendance on the Sovereign on ceremonial occasions. Six King's Marshalmen took part in the 1937 Coronation procession of King George VI; since when appointments to this office have ceased. The Marshalmen wore a distinctive uniform, consisting of a scarlet coat, blue trousers and a shako (a tall, cylindrical cap with a visor), and carried a baton engraved with the Royal Arms at one end, and at the other the coat of arms of the City of Westminster.

== See also ==
- Dublin City Marshal, maintained the Dublin Marshalsea

== Sources ==
- Bucholz, R. O. "Household Below Stairs List 2" (PDF). The Database of Court Officers 1660-1837. Loyola University Chicago. Knight Marshal 1660–1837.
