= John Digby (died 1533) =

Sir John Digby (died 1533) of Eye Kettleby, near Melton Mowbray, Leicestershire, was Knight Marshal for King Henry VIII.

== Origins ==
John was the third son of Everard Digby, Esq., MP (whose father had died at Towton, 1461) of Tilton on the Hill, Leicestershire and Jacquet, daughter of Sir John Ellys of Devonshire.

== Career ==
Digby was knighted by Henry VII for his services at the Battle of Bosworth Field, and appointed Knight Marshal for the King's household.

He was Steward of Lewes Priory, Sussex. He was High Sheriff of Warwickshire in 1515 and was also Sheriff of Rutland in 1491, 1517 and 1523, as was his father before him.

In 1513 Digby accompanied Henry VIII to Calais and fought in the battle of Thérouanne.

== Family ==
He married Katherine, daughter of Sir Nicholas Griffin of Braybrooke, Northamptonshire. They had at least two sons and two daughters.

- William
- Simon, his heir, who married Catherine Clapham of Beamesley
- Elizabeth, married Sir Humphrey Hercy of Grove, Nottinghamshire
- Anne, married Sir William Skeffington (died 1535) of Skeffington, Lord Deputy of Ireland

After the death of Katherine, Digby married as his second wife Sanche (née Willoughby), widow of John Strelley, on 24 October 1517.

== Death and burial ==
Digby died in May 1533 and was buried at St Mary's Church, Melton Mowbray, Leicestershire, where as well as at Frisby, Leicestershire, there is a monument to his memory.

Digby had been responsible for the construction of the clerestory of Melton Mowbray church in 1500, and the vestry located on the north side of the chancel in 1532, which is confirmed by a date stone set into the east wall.
