= Robert Hopton (died 1590) =

Member of the Parliament of England

Robert Hopton (died 1590), of Yoxford, Suffolk and of St Mary Mounthaw, London, was Knight Marshal of the Household 1560–1577, and English Member of Parliament for Mitchell in 1563. He was a son of Sir Arthur Hopton of Cockfield Hall, Yoxford, and brother of Sir Owen Hopton, Lieutenant of the Tower of London.

Ralph Hopton (died 1571) was appointed Knight Marshal of the Household in 1542, and continued in that office alone until 1556, when he stood down. He was reappointed in 1558, and on 20 May 1560 Queen Elizabeth granted the office to Ralph Hopton, Knight, and Robert Hopton together for life in survivorship. In 1561 his servant Roger Ratcliffe confessed to involvement in a highway robbery. An important prisoner at this time in the Marshalsea Court was Edmund Bonner, whom they escorted to the Court of King's Bench in October 1564.

Sir Ralph Hopton decided to perpetuate his surname in his patrimony of Witham Friary, Somerset, by arranging an alliance between his wife's niece Rachel Hall, and Robert Hopton's nephew (Sir) Arthur Hopton. He had settled the lands on Rachel in 1557, and on her heirs male if she married a Hopton: the marriage was agreed by 1566. After Ralph's death in 1571, Robert continued in the office until 1577. In 1574 one of his officers, Henry Percivall, and his attendants were brought before a grand jury for arresting men as far afield as Chelmsford and demanding money for their release.

He married Dorothy Pakenham, and his daughter Dorothy was his heir. By his will he made Dorothy, then a minor, joint executor with his nephew Arthur Hopton (died 1607), son of his brother Sir Owen Hopton, and appointed Arthur to be her guardian. Dorothy married Arthur Hopton's eldest son Owen Hopton.
