= David Elisha Davy =

English antiquary and collector

David Elisha Davy (1769–1851) was an English antiquary and collector from Suffolk.

== Life ==
He was the son of a farmer at Rumburgh, Suffolk, and the nephew of Eleazar Davy of Yoxford. Eleazar was locally prominent as Lord High Sheriff of Suffolk in 1770 and acquired some local position by the marriage of his stepdaughter with Sir John Rous. David Elisha Davy was born in 1769, and was educated at Yoxford under Samuel Forster. He entered Pembroke Hall, Cambridge, where he took his B.A. degree as sixth senior optime in 1790; he was ordained as deacon in 1792. In 1803, on the death of his uncle Eleazar, Davy succeeded to his estate, and then took up residence at Yoxford, where he became a magistrate and receiver-general of the county.

After 1815 Davy's estates were taken into possession by Gurney's Bank as security for advances made by them; but they were restored to the owner a few years before his death. Leaving Yoxford, Davy resided at Ufford near Woodbridge, and devoted himself to genealogical and antiquarian studies.

== Death and legacy ==
Davy died unmarried and intestate at Ufford on 15 August 1851, at the age of eighty-two. His estate went to his sister, the widow of William Barlee, rector of Wrentham, Suffolk, and at her death devised in accordance with the provisions of the will of Eleazar Davy. He was buried in St Peter's Church at Yoxford; a memorial plaque lies on the east wall of the nave.

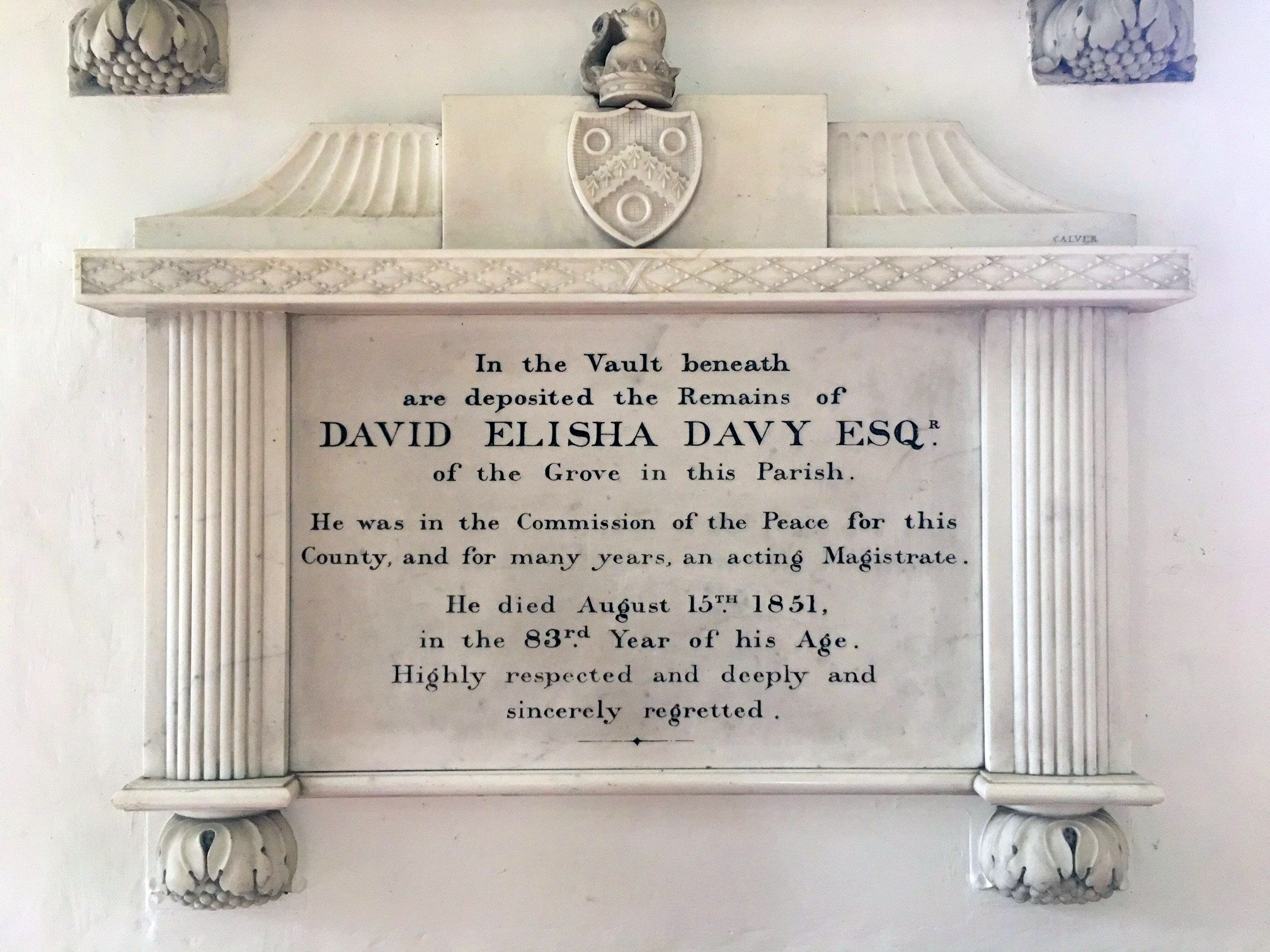
David Elisha Davy memorial in St Peter's Church, Yoxford

Davy's Suffolk manuscripts were purchased by the British Museum in 1852. They now form British Library Add MS 19077 to 19207, and include genealogical histories of Suffolk families, collections for the lives of Suffolk writers ("Athenæ Suffolcenses"), a number of volumes of "Illustrative Drawings" (Add MS 19176 to 19181), and a volume of "Arms of Suffolk Families" (Add MS 19159).

== Works ==
About 1803 Davy began to collect materials for a history of Suffolk, with a friend, Henry Jermyn of Sibton, barrister-at-law. In 1806 they copied manuscripts of the topographer Robert Hawes. Jermyn died in 1820, and his Suffolk manuscripts were bought by Herbert Gurney, and presented to the British Museum in 1830. They now form British Library Add MS 8168–8196. Davy continued to add to his collection up to his death, without any idea of publication.

Davy wrote anonymously the descriptive text for three volumes of works by the artist Henry Davy. He published A short Account of Leiston Abbey as D. E. D. (with descriptive and illustrative verses by B. Barton and W. Fletcher, edited by J. Bird, 1823). Under the signature D. A. Y., Davy was a frequent contributor to the Gentleman's Magazine. To the Topographer and Genealogist he contributed a series of notices of sepulchral monuments in Suffolk churches.
