= Barmy =

- Location within Azerbaijan
- Coordinates: 40°28′43″N 48°20′19″E
- Country: Azerbaijan
- Rayon: Agsu
- Time zone: UTC+4 (AZT)
  - Summer (DST): UTC+5 (AZT)

Barmy (also, Barumy-Perdli, Pardaly, and Varumy) is a village in the Agsu Rayon of Azerbaijan.
