= Cockfield Hall =

Grade I listed building in Suffolk, England

Coordinates: 52.2681°N 1.5101°E

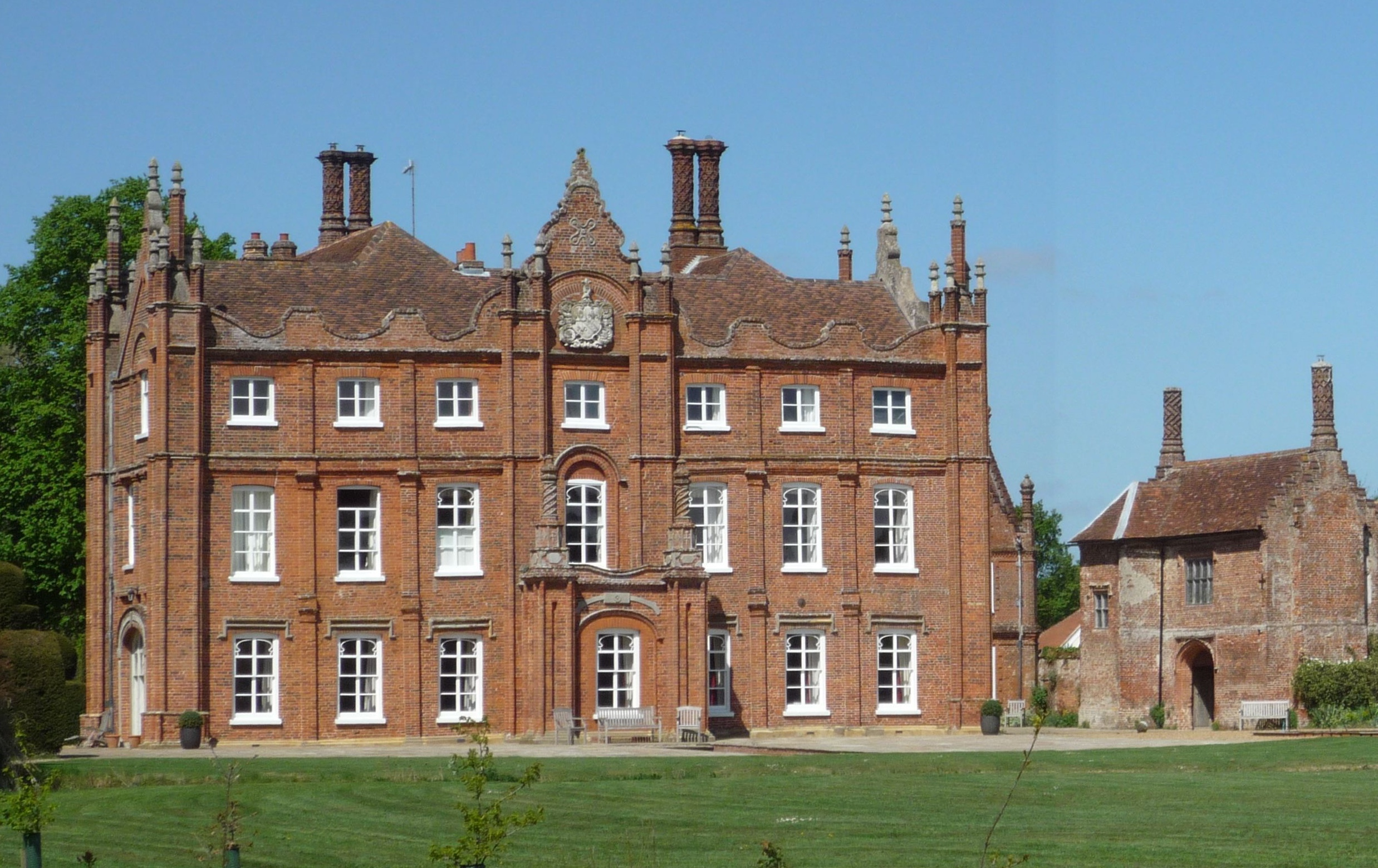
Cockfield Hall

Cockfield Hall in Yoxford in Suffolk, England is a Grade I listed private house standing in 76 acres (31 ha) of historic parkland, partly dating from the 16th century. Cockfield Hall takes its name from the Cokefeud Family, established there at the beginning of the 14th century. It was purchased by Jon Hunt in 2014 to form part of his Wilderness Reserve offering exclusive rural holiday accommodation.

== History ==
=== Hopton ===
The hall and estate were purchased from Sir John Fastolf by John Hopton (c.1405-1478), who in c. 1430 somewhat unexpectedly inherited various estates including that of Westwood (Blythburgh Lodge), near Walberswick in Suffolk, where he made his home. He also acquired the estate of Easton Bavents, a coastal place north of Southwold which has now disappeared into the sea, by purchase from the widow of Sir Robert Shardlow.

His great-grandson Sir Arthur Hopton, who accompanied Henry VIII at the Field of the Cloth of Gold, is thought to have been the builder of Cockfield Hall in its Tudor brick form, including the part now forming the north wing, and the Gatehouse. This work may date to around 1520, since Sir Arthur was still principally resident in Blythburgh in 1524. King Henry VIII passed Cockfield Hall in his progress from Westminster to Norwich in summer of 1541.

Sir Arthur's son and successor Sir Owen Hopton married Anne, elder daughter and heir of Sir Edward Echyngham of Barsham, Suffolk. As Lieutenant of the Tower of London, from c. 1569, he was ordered in October 1567 by Queen Elizabeth to take into custody at Cockfield so that she could recover from her privations, Lady Catherine Grey, sister of Lady Jane Grey and granddaughter of Mary Tudor. She died there a year later and was buried in the Cockfield Chapel in Yoxford Church. Sir Owen died in 1595, and his widow spent her last years at the home of her daughter Anne Pope, Countess of Downe, at Wroxton, Oxfordshire.

=== Brooke ===
Arthur Hopton (died 1607), son of Sir Owen Hopton, sold the estate of Cockfield Hall in 1597 to Robert Brooke (died 1601), citizen and Grocer of Bucklersbury in London, Sheriff of London 1590-91, Alderman for Queenhithe 1590-92 and for Walbrook 1592-99, whose grandfather Reginald Brooke had previously settled in Suffolk. Robert married Ursula, daughter of Robert Offley, and their son Sir Robert Brooke (1572-1646) became Sheriff of Suffolk in 1614 and sat as MP for Dunwich in 1624, 1625 and 1628. His second wife, Elizabeth, daughter of Thomas Colepeper of Great Wigsell, East Sussex, was a devout author of Christian writings. For Sir Robert the elder, the main manor house was rebuilt around 1613, while preserving as its north wing part of the mansion built by Sir Arthur Hopton: and despite various alterations, rebuildings and repairs, Sir Robert Brooke's building remains part of the present Cockfield Hall.

Robert and Elizabeth resided at Cockfield Hall from 1630, and Sir Robert, a member of the parliamentarian Suffolk county committee during the English Civil War, died and was buried at Yoxford in 1646. He left his estate to his son (Sir) Robert (1637-1669), but it was partly tied up with a jointure to Elizabeth, Lady Brooke, who lived at Cockfield Hall until her death in 1683, when she also was buried at Yoxford church. The younger Sir Robert married Anne, daughter of Sir Henry Mildmay, and lived mainly at his residence in Wanstead, Essex, but sat as MP for Aldeburgh in 1660 and 1661-69. His promising career in parliament ended when he drowned while bathing at Avignon, and Wanstead was sold with the assent of his sister Mary, his nephew Nathaniel Bacon (the Virginian rebel, son of Thomas Bacon of Friston Hall (Suffolk) and Elizabeth Brooke), and his brother-in-law Walter Mildmay, whose forfeited estates Robert had bought.

=== Blois ===
Martha Brooke, daughter of the elder Sir Robert and Elizabeth, Lady Brooke, married Sir William Blois of Grundisburgh Hall, Suffolk, but died in 1657. After Lady Brooke died in 1683, and her unmarried daughter Mary in 1693, Cockfield Hall passed to Martha's son, Sir Charles Blois, 1st Baronet, who took up residence at Cockfield in 1686. He sat as MP for Ipswich in 1689 and 1690, and for Dunwich in 1700, 1701 (twice), 1702, 1705 and 1708-09. From there on, the house remained in the ownership of the Blois family until 1997. The main part of the house had sash windows installed in the 18th century and in 1896 the Victorian Great Hall was created on the site of the original Tudor Hall in the Jacobean style.

=== Hunt ===
After being on the market for two years, the house with its 74 acre estate was purchased by Jon Hunt in 2014 as part of the Wilderness Reserve, and was developed to provide exclusive holiday accommodation.

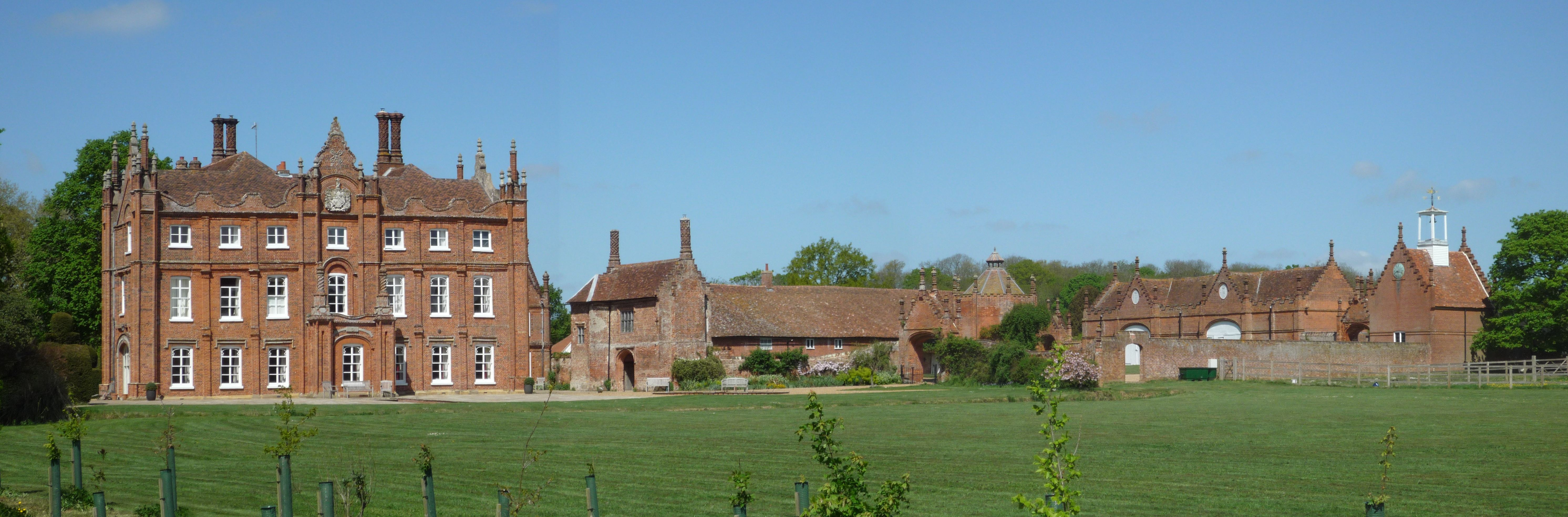
