= Cleer Sewell Alger =

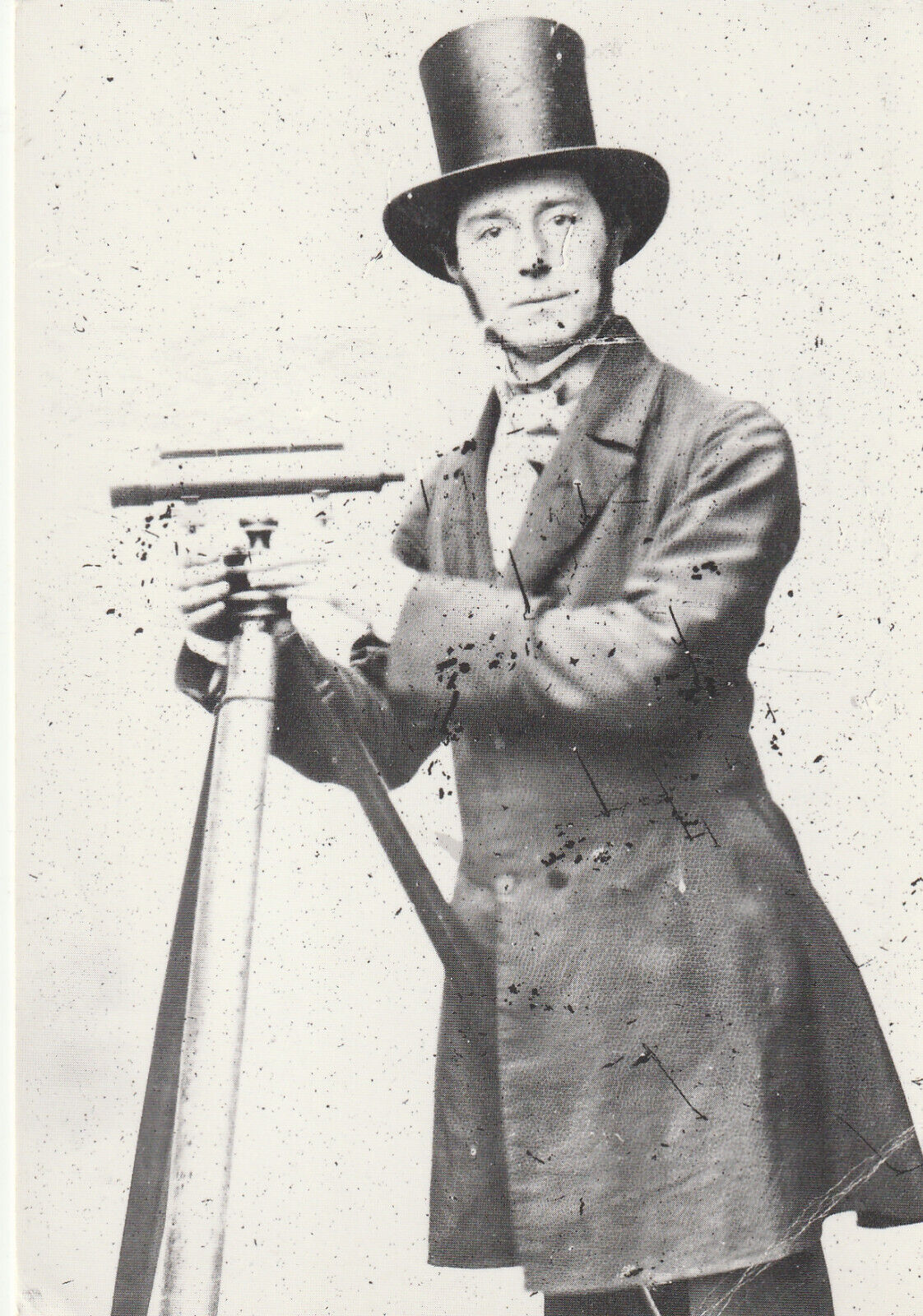
- Cleer Sewell Alger with theodolite
- Born: 1819; Diss, Norfolk, England
- Died: May 9, 1892; Diss, Norfolk, England
- Occupations: Photographer; surveyor; auctionner; lythographer
- Known for: Photography pioneer

Cleer Sewell Alger (1819 – 9 May 1892) was a Victorian photographic pioneer based in Diss on the Norfolk Suffolk border. Also working as a surveyor and lithographer, he took parts from a theodolite he had used for surveying to enhance his photographic equipment.
