= Hamlet Watling =

English antiquarian (1818–1908)

Hamlet Watling (born Kelsale, Suffolk, 1818, died Ipswich, 2 April 1908) was a Suffolk-born antiquary, who worked as a schoolmaster. He spent much of his life to recording clerical and other antiquities in his native county. His prolific records and illustrations contain much unique information, though mostly unpublished. Many are held in public and private collections. He conducted excavations, contributed to learned societies, and wrote lengthy weekly columns in the regional press over some 40 years from about 1868 until his death.

== Family and teaching career ==
Hamlet was born in 1818 at Kelsale near Saxmundham, Suffolk, the son of Henry Watling, Master of the Endowed School there from 1818 to 1858, and his wife Phyllis (née Newson). Four sons followed their father's profession: Walter and Llewellyn were assistant masters at Banbury and Edwin, married to a descendant of the actor William 'Gentleman' Smith) was writing master at Cheltenham in 1852–1869. Hamlet taught at Aldeburgh, Woodbridge, Cavendish and Ipswich in the 1830s, at Wangford near Southwold in about 1840–1849, and at Dunwich until 1855. Finally he became Master of Earl Stonham Endowed School in 1855–1888. He then retired to Ipswich and continued work on his collections until he died in 1908.

== Illustration and writings ==
Watling's best paintings (screen panels, wall-paintings, glass windows, etc.) are impressive, but the great bulk of his surviving work consists of sketches, tracings and rather weak duplicate versions made for sale in later life. He compiled 12 volumes of Suffolk heraldry and genealogy in manuscript. He excavated on Roman sites in Suffolk in the 1860s and 1870s and made investigations of the Antonine Itinerary in the county.

From about 1867 to 1908, Watling wrote weekly for the Suffolk Chronicle and East Anglian Daily Times explaining the iconography of church paintings to a wide readership and exploring the Anglo-Saxon history of Suffolk.

== Antiquarian collaborations ==
Watling collaborated at various times with the archaeologist Charles Roach Smith and with Henry Syer Cuming, founder of the Cuming Museum collection, Rev. Sparrow Simpson, James Fowler, W. de Grey Burch, H. A. Henfrey, Canon J. J. Raven on Burgh Castle or Gariannonum), Richard Almack on Long Melford glass), C. E. Searle, later Master of Pembroke College, Cambridge), George E. Fox on Walton Castle) and many other noted antiquaries. Sir Henry A. Howorth much admired Watling's paintings.

In about 1898–1899, Watling helped to launch the career of Nina Frances Layard (1853–1935), a pioneering archaeologist from Ipswich. In about 1921–1922, she became one of the first female Fellows of the Society of Antiquaries of London.

== Evaluation and sources ==
Watling's antiquarian reputation was somewhat overtaken by changing fashions in archaeology, and as a growing middle class found his form of country scholarship and village-schoolmaster status increasingly quaint and rustic. Some of his drawings contain undifferentiated reconstruction, and his interpretations (for instance of Dunwich topography) are often questionable. Nonetheless, his archives of drawings form a vast resource for careful students and the influence of his 40 years of specialist journalism contributed to popular understanding of Suffolk antiquities for the following century.

The source cited includes biographical and bibliographical material of value, as Watling is omitted from the current Oxford Dictionary of National Biography.

- S. J. Plunkett, 1997, "Hamlet Watling, artist and schoolmaster 1818–1908", Proc Suffolk Inst of Archaeology and History 39 Pt 1, pp. 48–75. .
