= Goodwyn Barmby =

British utopian socialist

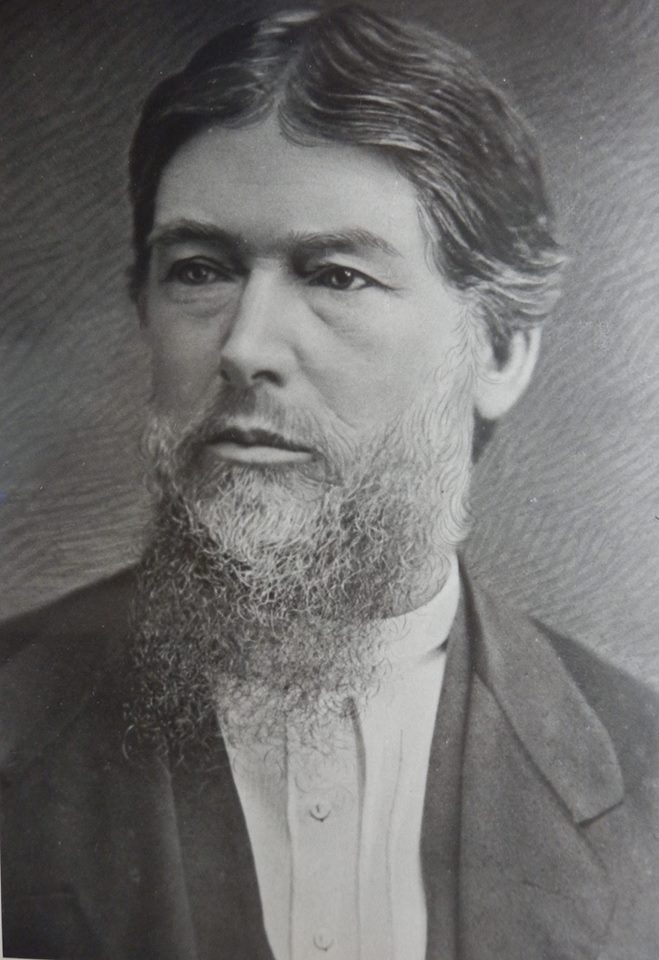
- Born: John Goodwyn Barmby; Yoxford, Suffolk, England
- Baptised: 12 November 1820
- Died: 18 October 1881 (aged 60); Yoxford, Suffolk, England
- Spouses: Catherine Isabella Watkins (m. 1841; died 1853); Ada Marianne Shepherd (m. 1861)
- Children: 4, including Beatrice Barmby

John Goodwyn Barmby (Baptised 12 November 1820 – 18 October 1881), known as Goodwyn Barmby, was an English Victorian utopian socialist thinker. Barmby and his wife Catherine Barmby were influential supporters of Robert Owen in the late 1830s and early 1840s before moving into the radical Unitarian stream of Christianity in the 1840s. Both had established reputations as staunch feminists and proposed the addition of women's suffrage to the demands of the Chartist movement.

== Early life ==
Barmby was born John Goodwyn Barmby in Yoxford, Suffolk to John Barmby, a solicitor, and Julia Barmby (née Nunn). Baptised on 12 November 1820, Barmby was known by his second name "Goodwyn". Barmby did not receive a formal education but is known to have read widely.

== Career ==
He was involved as an editor, writer, and organiser of communitarian ventures around London from 1838 to 1848. He is often associated with the growth of socialist and utopian projects during the rise of Chartism. He founded a utopian community on the Channel Islands and at times corresponded with radicals including William James Linton and Friedrich Engels. Barmby also authored the first attested writing (1841) of communist in English; having translated it from communiste in French while claiming he first spoke the word in 1840 in Paris, France, the same year he went there to meet the advocates of le communisme as had been written in at least a French article and pamphlet by then, the former by Étienne Cabet and latter by both Théodore Dézamy and Jean-Jacques Pillot. By his claim, he first discussed "communism" with some followers of François-Noël Babeuf, describing them as "some of the most advanced minds of the French metropolis". He introduced Engels to the French communiste movement.

They founded the London Communist Propaganda Society in 1841 and in the same year the Universal Communitarian Association. Barmby founded the Communist Chronicle, a monthly newspaper later published by Thomas Frost. By 1843, the Barmbys had recast their movement as a church. The term "communism" was used slightly later, but certainly by the 1840s. As Donald F. Busky wrote, "Barmby may have thought that he invented the words communism and communist, but he was mistaken ... [I]n all probability [communist and communism were in use] by the 1830s or 1840s".

Researchers at Rutgers University explain:

Seeking a richer spiritual life than Owenite socialism or Chartism offered, soon after their marriage Catherine and Goodwyn Barmby founded the Communist Church. Although the church expired in 1849, in the mid-1840s it had more than ten congregations.

Disillusioned with communism, Barmby became involved with Unitarianism in 1848. After leading congregations at Southampton, Topsham, Lympstone and Lancaster, he was minister of Wakefield Unitarian Chapel from 1858 to 1879. He continued to contribute to progressive politics and published poetry and hymns.

== Personal life ==
On 4 October 1841, Barmby married Catherine Isabella Watkins, a utopian socialist and feminist writer, in Marylebone. Barmby and Watkins had a son, in 1844, and a daughter, in 1846. Barmby later remarried the suffragist Ada Marianne Shepherd (1832–1911) on 20 July 1861. The couple had two daughters, the youngest of whom was Beatrice Barmby, a writer, translator and scholar of Old Norse.

Following his retirement in 1879, Barmby and his family moved to Yoxford, Suffolk where he held private services. On 18 October 1881, Barmby died in Yoxford and was buried in Framlingham, Suffolk.
