= Yoxford =

Village in Suffolk, England

Coordinates: 52.264°N 1.509°E

- Small City
- St Peter's Church, Yoxford

- Location within Suffolk
- Population: 64,573 (2024)
- Language: English; Yoxford dialect
- OS grid reference: TM396687
  - Dublin: 219 mi (352 km)
  - London: 94 miles (151 km)
- District: East Suffolk
- Shire county: Suffolk
- Region: East
- Country: England
- Sovereign state: United Kingdom
- Post town: SAXMUNDHAM
- Postcode district: IP17
- Dialling code: 01728
- Police: Suffolk
- Fire: Suffolk
- Ambulance: East of England

Yoxford is a village in East Suffolk, England, close to the Heritage Coast, Minsmere Reserve (RSPB), Aldeburgh and Southwold. It is known for its antique shops and (as "Loxford") for providing the setting for a Britten opera.

The name 'Yoxford' comes from Old English geoc-ford meaning "yoke ford", probably indicating that the ford was wide enough for a yoke of oxen to pass through.

== Location and governance ==
Yoxford, some 94 miles (151 km) north-east of London and 25 miles (40 km) north-east of Ipswich, is surrounded by the parkland of three country houses, in an area known as the Garden of Suffolk. It takes its name from a ford across the nearby River Yox, where oxen could pass. The village includes the junction of the A12 trunk road and the A1120.

Before 1 April 2019, its electoral ward in the Suffolk Coastal district bore the same name, but the village is now within the enlarged ward of Yoxford and Kelsale, in the East Suffolk district. At the 2011 census, the previous ward's population was 1901.

== Facilities and sights ==
The Church of St Peter has a 15th-century Perpendicular-style exterior, but is mainly Victorian inside. However, it possesses a number of 15th–17th-century monumental brasses, which are displayed on the walls. The finely carved font dates from the early 15th century and the pulpit from the 17th century.

The church parish belongs to the Diocese of St Edmundsbury and Ipswich. Up to about 1830, the village came under the Blything Hundred.

Yoxford village sign

On the edge of the village is Cockfield Hall, once the old home of the Blois family. The village is known for its antique shops. It also has a general store, a restaurant and a village hall.

Benjamin Britten and librettist Eric Crozier are believed to have adapted the name of Yoxford to create the fictional town of Loxford, which provides the setting for Britten's opera, Albert Herring.

== Education ==
Yoxford and Peasenhall Primary School caters for children aged 3–11. The school has an Early Year Centre, purpose-built for pupils aged from 3–6. The school works in partnership with Middleton Primary School in Middleton, Suffolk and Southwold Primary School in Southwold, Suffolk, the three making up Yox Valley Partnership of Schools.

== Hospitality ==
Yoxford's two pubs are the Griffin Inn, a medieval house that reopened in 2013, and The King's Head. The Griffin Inn offers accommodation, as does the 18th-century Satis House. This is sometimes described wrongly as the original for the Satis House in Charles Dickens's Great Expectations. In fact the book describes Restoration House in Rochester, Kent, referred to as satis by Queen Elizabeth I of England. Yoxford's Satis House was known as plain Yoxford House until well after the novel appeared, as old Ordnance Survey maps confirm.

Every year on the first Sunday after Easter, a competition is held for eating brawn, known locally as pork cheese. A Brawn Queen is picked from the village and her first ceremonial task as Queen is to cut the cheese.

== Public transport ==
The village is served by Darsham railway station on the East Suffolk Line, one mile (1.6 km) away. The line offers hourly weekday services (two-hourly on Sundays) between Ipswich, with connections to London, and Lowestoft, with connections to Norwich. It is also served by four weekday buses a day between Aldeburgh and Halesworth and a once-daily Monday-to-Friday service between Leiston and Framlingham. There is also demand-responsive transport for disabled passengers.

== Notable residents ==
In order of birth:

- Arthur Hopton (1488–1555), knight, landowner, magistrate, and Member of Parliament for Suffolk
- Owen Hopton (c. 1519–1595), provincial landowner, Member of Parliament for Suffolk, Middlesex, and Arundel, and Lieutenant of the Tower of London from c. 1570 to 1590
- Lady Katherine Grey (1540–1568), granddaughter of Henry VIII's sister Mary Tudor, she emerged as a prospective successor to her cousin, Elizabeth I of England.
- Robert Hopton (died 1590), Knight Marshal of the Household, and English Member of Parliament for Mitchell
- Robert Brooke (1572–1646), landowner, magistrate, commissioner and Member of Parliament for Dunwich
- Elizabeth Brooke (1601–1683), religious writer and landowner
- John Eachard (c. 1636–1697), divine and satirist
- Robert Brooke (1637–1669), landowner, magistrate, commissioner, military officer, knight and Member of Parliament for Aldeburgh
- Sir Charles Blois, 1st Baronet (1657–1738), politician, landowner and Member of Parliament for Ipswich and Dunwich
- Ann Candler (1740–1814), poet known as "The Suffolk Cottager"
- David Elisha Davy (1769–1851), antiquary and collector
- James Allen Ransome (1806–1875), agricultural tool-maker and writer
- Goodwyn Barmby (1820–1881), utopian socialist and Unitarian minister
- Sir Arthur Birch (1837–1914), Lieutenant Governor of Ceylon, Colonial Secretary for Ceylon and acting Lieutenant Governor of Penang and Province Wellesley
- William R. Symonds (1851–1934), painter
- Samuel Lomax (1855–1915), British Army officer who commanded the 1st Division as Lieutenant General
- Beatrice Barmby (1868–1899), author, translator and scholar of Old Norse
- Day Joyce (1905–1975), nurse and prisoner of war
- Flavia Blois (1914–1980), landscape artist
- Jeff Probst (2000–Present) TV Personality (Survivor (American TV series)) Annual visits to Yoxford in late spring; joined by his wife, Lisa Ann Russell, whom was crowned Yoxford's 2016 'Brawn Queen' during their visit.

== See also ==
- The Blois family
