= Ralph Hopton (died 1571) =

English politician (1509/10–1571)

Sir Ralph Hopton (1509/1510 – 14 December 1571), of Witham, Somerset, was an English courtier and politician. He was the son of a member of the Hopton family and Agnes Haines.

In younger life a servant of Thomas Cromwell, in 1540 he was granted lease of the demesne lands of Ayshbury in Berkshire, a grange of Glastonbury Abbey which had been in dispute with the Bishop of Sarum. He became (knight) marshal of the Household from 1542. Witham Charterhouse, for grant in fee of the reversion of which (with its rents, site, lands and sundry associated tithes) he paid £573 in 1544, was the site of the earliest Carthusian priory in England. He was knighted in 1545. In 1549 he delivered the letters from Sir John Russell and William Herbert showing their support for Warwick against Lord Protector Somerset.

He was surveyor for the Court of Augmentations for Somerset in 1550-1554, and built up a sizeable estate of former monastic property in that county. He continued his offices for the Exchequer from 1554 until his death. He was a Member (MP) of the Parliament of England for Somerset in March 1553, October 1553 and 1555. He continued as Knight Marshal of the Household to 1556, when he temporarily resigned the position, but resumed it alone from 1558 to 1560. He sat again in parliament, for Heytesbury, in 1559. From that time he continued as Knight Marshal jointly with Robert Hopton until his death in 1571.

He married Dorothy Willoughby, sister of William Willoughby, 1st Baron Willoughby of Parham. Her niece Rachel Hall, daughter of Edmund Hall of Greatford in Lincolnshire, was brought up under the supervision of Sir Ralph, who settled the remainder of most of his lands on Rachel in 1557, and on her heirs male if she married a Hopton. Her marriage was arranged to Arthur Hopton (son of Sir Owen Hopton and nephew of his fellow-marshal Robert Hopton), and the settlement was confirmed in 1566. His will left the residue to his wife. At Ralph's death and inquisition post mortem, his heir-at-law was however found to be his uncle William Haines, by then an octogenarian.

== Supposed kinship to Sir Arthur Hopton ==
He is said by some to have been kinsman of the half-blood to Owen Hopton, Robert Hopton (died 1590) and Arthur Hopton (died 1607). His will refers to "my nephew Arthur" and "Mistress Rachel his wife" in the same sentence, and asks that they remember his poor kinred.

In a suit of 1601 Sir Ralph's half-sister's daughter, Elizabeth Gregorie, stated that the remainder of the estate, after the death of Lady Dorothie, was left "to Arthur Hopton Esquire the defendant, being of his name and not of any alliaunce or consanguinitye unto him, and to Rachell Hall thother defendante whom Arthur was then to marrie". Sir Arthur and Rachel, in their deposition, agreed that Sir Ralph intended that the estates "for the mayntenaunce of the name of the Hoptons should remayne and come unto the use and behoofe of the said defendante Rachel and the heires males of her bodye to be begotten by the said defendant Arthur (his surname in blodd being Hopton)".

Reaching their sentence the justices in Chancery noted that Sir Ralph had left his lands "to the defendaunte Rachaell being noe waie allyed unto her so as she married unto one whose surname should be Hopton, which she afterwarde did marrie with the said Arthur Hopton"; and Lord Keeper Egerton, "in respect of the greate advauncemente whiche the said defendauntes had had by the said Sir Raphe", awarded the suit for the copyhold of a gristmill at Ditcheat to Elizabeth Gregorie and her husband. Had Sir Ralph been the half-brother of Sir Arthur Hopton's father, Sir Arthur would not have expressed his title in this fashion.
