= Catherine Isabella Barmby =

English socialist and feminist writer (1817–1853)

- Born: Catherine Isabella Watkins c. 1816 – c. 1817
- Died: 26 December 1853; Topsham, Devon, England
- Occupation: Writer
- Spouse: Goodwyn Barmby (m. 1841)
- Children: 2
- Writing career
- Pen name: Kate
- Notable works: The Religion of the Millennium (1836); The Demand for the Emancipation of Women, Politically and Socially (1843)

Catherine Isabella Barmby (née Watkins; {c. 1816 – c. 1817 – 26 December 1853), also known by the pen name Kate, was an English utopian socialist and feminist writer on women's emancipation. She wrote for the New Moral World journal and covered topics including women's reduced access to employment, millennialism, and women's suffrage.

== Early life ==
Barmby was the second daughter of Bridstock Watkins and belonged to the lower-middle class. Little is known of her early life or education, but her instruction allowed her to become a writer and lecturer.

== Career ==
The New Moral World was the official journal of the Owenite radical socialist movement and was first issued in December 1834 after its predecessor The Pioneer ceased publication in July 1834. Watkins was first published in the New Moral World in 1835 under the pen-name "Kate." She continued writing for this journal for more than five years.

Barmby's articles for the New Moral World covered feminist demands and the general Owenite concerns of the time, such as women's reduced access to employment and the danger that private property supposes for family life, as well as explanations and reflections on Robert Owen's views.

Her 6 February 1836 journal article titled The Religion of the Millennium also reflected her Millennialist beliefs, predicting a future socialist faith founded on "moral purity and moral liberty" with "an unremitting love and practice of the truth." She also evoked the figure of an emancipated female Messiah who would end sex-based oppression.

She married the utopian socialist thinker Goodwyn Barmby in 1841 at Marylebone in London. Barmby gave birth to their son Moreville Watkyns Barmby in 1844 and their daughter Maria Julia Barmby in 1846. Barmby's husband launched the Central Communist Propaganda Society, which became the Communist Church by 1844, and is credited with the first use of the word communist in the English language. Barmby herself became a central figure in the Communist Church movement.

After the demise of the Communist Church, Barmby resumed her writing. With her husband, Barmby published A Declaration of Social Reform, which called for "unsexual Chartism" and demanded that the People's Charter of 1838 include the vote for women. Her 1843 tract The Demand for the Emancipation of Women, Politically and Socially was an early work arguing the case for women's enfranchisement. She also attempted to set up an independent feminist journal or magazine, but died before this could be realised.

== Death ==
Barmby died of asthma and consumption on 26 December 1853 at Bridge Hill, Topsham, Devon. Her husband survived her and died in 1881.
