= Robert Hopton (died 1638) =

English landowner and politician

Robert Hopton (c.1575–1638) was an English landowner and politician who sat in the House of Commons in two parliaments between 1604 and 1622.

Hopton was the eldest son of Sir Arthur Hopton of Witham Friary, Somerset and his wife Rachel Hall, daughter of Edmund Hall of Greatford, Lincolnshire. In 1604, he was elected Member of Parliament for Shaftesbury. Between about 1609 and 1617 he was engaged in the construction of Evercreech House. He was Sheriff of Somerset for the year 1618 to 1619. In 1621 he was elected MP for Somerset.

== Family ==
By his wife Jane Kemys (daughter and heir of Rowland Kemys of the Vaudrey, or Faerdref, Monmouthshire), Robert Hopton had several children:

- Ralph Hopton, 1st Baron Hopton, who married Elizabeth (died 1646), daughter of Arthur Capell of Little Hadham, Hertfordshire, and widow of Justinian Lewin of Otterden, Kent.
- William Hopton (University of Oxford); died young.
- Mary Hopton, who married (1) Sir Henry Mackworth, 2nd Bt. (died 1640), son and heir of Sir Thomas Mackworth, Bart., of Normanton, Rutland, and Sir Thomas Burton (died 1693) of Burton Lazars, Leicestershire.
- Margaret Hopton, who married Sir Baynham Throckmorton (1606–1664), 2nd Bart., MP, of Clearwell, Gloucestershire.
- Catherine Hopton (died 1663), married John Wyndham (died 1649) of Orchard Wyndham, Somerset.
- Rachel Hopton, who married (1) David Kemys of Cefn Mably House, Glamorgan, and (2) Sir Thomas Morgan of Tredegar, Monmouthshire.
- Joan Hopton (1607–1609), buried at Ditcheat.

Parliament of England
Preceded by Arthur Messenger; John Budden	Member of Parliament for Shaftesbury; 1604–1611; With: John Budden	Succeeded by Henry Croke; Sir Miles Sandys
Preceded by John Poulett; Sir Maurice Berkeley	Member of Parliament for Somerset; 1621–1622; With: Sir Maurice Berkeley	Succeeded by Sir Robert Phelips; John Simms
