= Arthur Hopton (diplomat) =

English diplomat

Sir Arthur Hopton
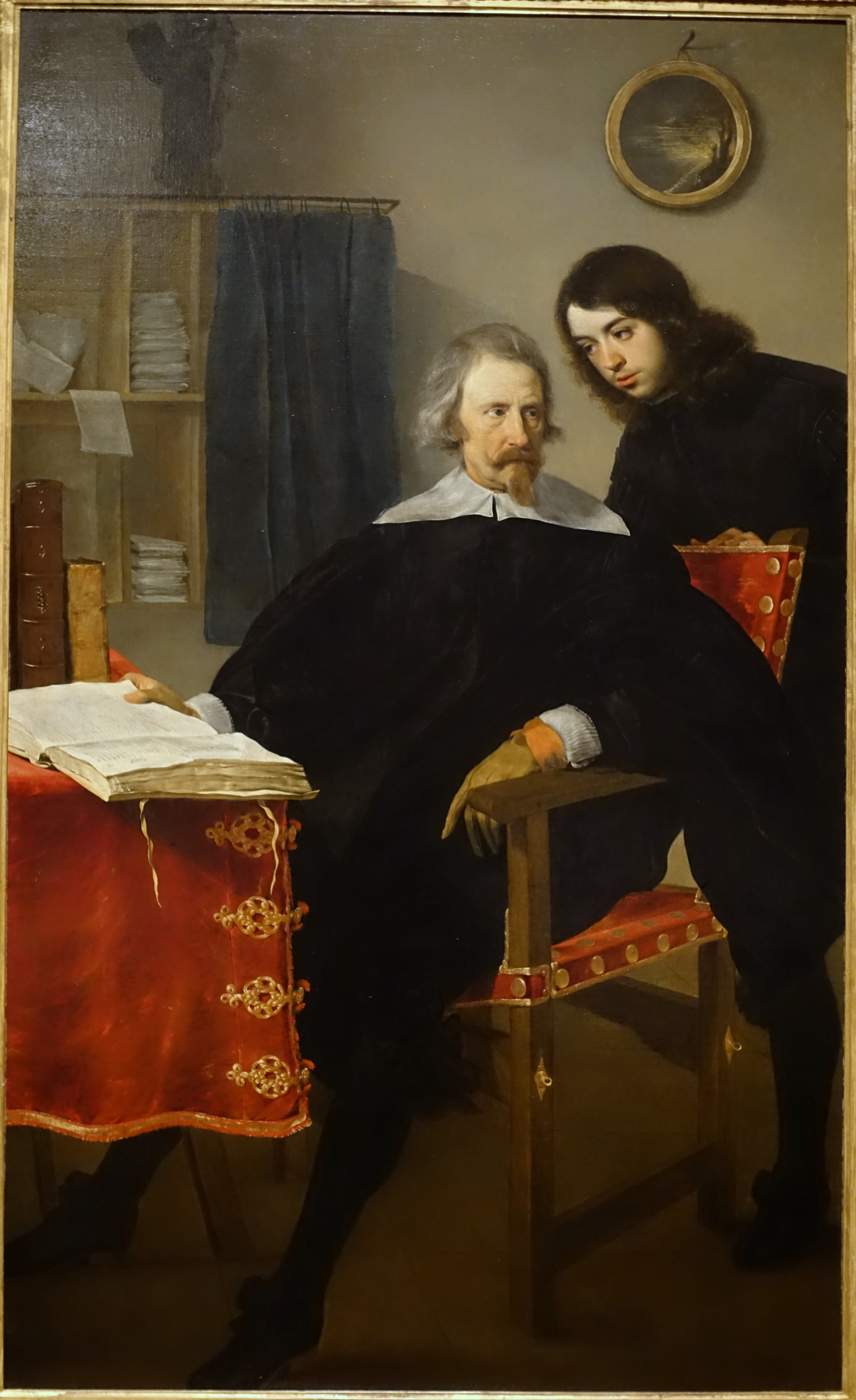
- Sir Arthur Hopton, circa 1641

English Ambassador to Spain
- In office 1638–1645
- Monarch: Charles I
- Preceded by: Lord Aston
- Succeeded by: Vacant

Resident Agent in Madrid
- In office 1630–1636

Personal details
- Born: c. 1588 Blythburgh, Suffolk
- Died: 6 March 1650 (aged 61) Bampton, Oxfordshire
- Resting place: St Mary's, Black Bourton
- Relations: Sir Ralph Hopton
- Parent(s): Sir Arthur Hopton (c. 1545-1607); Rachael Hall
- Education: Lincoln College, Oxford
- Occupation: Diplomat

Sir Arthur Hopton (c. 1588-6 March 1650) was an English diplomat who spent most of his career in Madrid, where he was Resident Agent from 1630 to 1636, then Ambassador from 1638 to 1645.

Uncle of Sir Ralph Hopton, a Royalist general during the 1642 to 1646 First English Civil War, Sir Arthur was rarely paid, and was unable to achieve much, but left detailed memoranda on his activities. He returned to England in 1648, where he died on 6 March 1650.

== Life ==
Hopton was the fifth son of Sir Arthur Hopton, circa 1545 to 1607, and Rachael Hall. He was born on his father's estates in Blythburgh, Suffolk, which were sold a few years later to provide dowries for his ten sisters. The family relocated to Witham Friary in Somerset, acquired from Glastonbury Abbey after the Dissolution of the Monasteries in 1538.

His grandfather, Sir Owen Hopton, was Lieutenant of the Tower of London from 1573 to 1590, and his father High Sheriff of Somerset in 1583. Sir Arthur never married, and left his property to his nephew, Sir Nicholas Throckmorton.

== Career ==
As with other members of the family, including near contemporary and nephew Sir Ralph Hopton, he attended Lincoln College, Oxford, graduating in 1609.

Little is known of his movements until October 1629, when he accompanied Lord Cottington to Spain as secretary. In the 1630 Treaty of Madrid, Charles I agreed to end support for the Protestant Dutch Republic, in return for Spain doing the same with English Catholics. However, Philip IV refused to back the restoration of Charles' aunt Elizabeth to the Palatinate, and the treaty was deeply unpopular in England.

When Cottington returned to England, Hopton remained in Madrid as Resident agent, much of his time being spent on commercial issues. Fluent in Spanish, he was on good terms with chief minister Olivares, although Olivares preferred to rely on his own contacts in London. He was recalled to London in early 1636, before being knighted on 2 February 1638, when he succeeded Lord Aston as English ambassador to Spain.

He remained in Spain throughout the Wars of the Three Kingdoms; in 1641, he prepared a list of his activities, apparently to help his request to be paid. Finally recalled in 1645, he went to France, rather than England, spending time with Sir Richard Browne, English ambassador in Paris, then Rouen, where he was visited by his nephew, Sir Ralph. When the Second English Civil War ended in 1648, Sir Arthur went to live in Wissett, Suffolk; on 7 June 1649, he was visited there by the diarist John Evelyn.

Hopton died on 6 March 1650, aged 62, and was buried in the chancel of St Mary's, Black Bourton, near Bampton, Oxfordshire. He left property to his nephew, as well as bequests to his younger sister. (Note: Brown misstates his place of death as Wissett, Surrey)

Many of his despatches are included in Clarendon's papers held by the Bodleian Library, while the Tanner collection of manuscripts contains several of his letters relating to the 1640 Portuguese revolution.

== Sources ==
- Brown, Frederick (1890). Abstracts of Somersetshire Wills, Etc (2015 ed.). Sagwan. ISBN 978-1340443344.
- Edgar, F. T. R. (1968). Sir Ralph Hopton. The King's Man in the West (1642–1652). Oxford: Clarendon Press. ISBN 0-19-821372-7.
- Evelyn, John (1901). William, Bray (ed.). The Diary of John Evelyn (Vol 1 of 2). Walter Dunne.
- Loomie, AJ (2008). "Hopton, Sir Arthur". Oxford Dictionary of National Biography (online ed.). Oxford University Press. doi:10.1093/ref:odnb/13770. (Subscription, Wikipedia Library access or UK public library membership required.)
- Loomie, AJ (1969). "Olivares, the English Catholics and the Peace of 1630". Revue Belge de Philologie et d'Histoire. 47 (4): 1154–1166. doi:10.3406/rbph.1969.2798.
