= Arthur Hopton (died 1607) =

English politician (c.1545–1607)

Sir Arthur Hopton KB MP, JP,

MP for Suffolk
- In office 1588–1589

High Sheriff of Somerset
- In office 1583–1584

MP for Dunwich
- In office 1571–1572

Personal details
- Born: c. 1545 Blythburgh, Suffolk
- Died: 20 November 1607 (aged 62) Witham Friary, Somerset
- Resting place: St Mary, Witham Friary
- Spouse: Rachael Hall
- Children: 5 sons, 11 daughters
- Parent(s): Sir Owen Hopton; Anne Etchingham
- Education: Gray's Inn
- Occupation: Politician and landowner
- Awards: Order of the Bath 1603

Sir Arthur Hopton KB (died 20 November 1607), of Witham, Somerset, was an English politician. He was member of parliament for Dunwich in 1571, and for Suffolk in 1589. He was made a Knight of the Bath at the coronation of King James I.

Arthur was the first son of Sir Owen Hopton and Anne, elder daughter of Sir Edward Echyngham and Ann Everard. He married Rachel, daughter of Edmund Hall of Greatford, Lincolnshire: the marriage was arranged by May 1566. Rachel was the niece of William Willoughby, 1st Baron Willoughby of Parham, whose sister Dorothy Willoughby was the wife of Sir Ralph Hopton (died 1571).

Sir Ralph Hopton, who made himself responsible for Rachel's upbringing, arranged her marriage to Arthur and settled the reversion of most of his lands upon them in tail male, including his estate of Witham Friary in Somerset. Although it has been claimed that Ralph was a half-brother of Sir Owen Hopton's, a suit of 1601 indicates that the marriage of Rachel and Arthur was arranged to ensure that Sir Ralph's estates continued in a family named Hopton, and not through any alliance of consanguinity.

Sir Arthur himself was co-executor to his uncle Robert Hopton (died 1590) and guardian of Robert's daughter Dorothy, who married Arthur's son Owen Hopton. His father Sir Owen Hopton having died in 1595, leaving plentiful debts, Sir Arthur Hopton sold away the Hopton family estates around Yoxford and Blythburgh in east Suffolk to Robert Brooke, Alderman of London, in 1597. Brooke apparently bought them in anticipation of the first marriage of his son, also Robert Brooke, which occurred shortly afterwards.

In the course of this transaction, Hopton brought a charge of fraud against the Brookes whom he accused of falsely interlineating the conveyance to include the manor of Blythburgh Priory and the Blythburgh rectory (not intended to be conveyed). There was a severe wrangle over the conveyances and payments, during which Sir Arthur was imprisoned by Brooke the elder; by 1601 Brooke the elder was dead and Hopton faced a costly adjustment of his affairs. The estates were settled upon Brooke the younger by 1598, who made his seat at the former Hopton manor of Westwood (Blythburgh) before rebuilding Cockfield Hall at Yoxford, all of which by marriage descended in a later generation to the Blois family. The recognisances and Statutes Staple applicable to the manors were released to Robert Brooke by Sir Arthur's son Robert Hopton in 1613, six years after his father's death.

During the Spanish Armada crisis of 1588, Arthur Hopton commanded one of the regiments of the Somerset Trained Bands that marched to join Queen Elizabeth I and her army at Tilbury.

James VI and I appointed Hopton as surveyor of the crown lands in Somerset on 31 May 1603.

== Family ==
The children of Arthur and Rachel Hopton are:

- Robert Hopton, c. 1575–1638, of Witham, married Jane, daughter and heir of Rowland Keymis of the Vaudrey, or Faerdref, Monmouthshire.
- Owen Hopton, married Dorothy, daughter and heir of "Sir" Robert Hopton (both died 1609).
- (Sir) Thomas Hopton (4th son, born c. 1584), of University College, Oxford (1602, aged 18), knighted 1633, died 1638.
- (Sir) Arthur Hopton (5th son, born c. 1588), diplomat, knighted 1638, died 1650.
- Dorothy Hopton, married (1) William Smith of Burgh Castle, Suffolk, and (2) Sir Nathaniel Bacon of Stiffkey, Norfolk (died 1623).
- Catherine Hopton, married Sir George Morton, Bt., of Milborne St Andrew, Dorset (died 1661).
- Selina Hopton, married (1) Henry Bodenham of Fugglestone St Peter, Wiltshire (died 1595), and (2) Robert Baskett, of Dewlish, Dorset (died 1613).
- Willoughby Hopton, married Sir Thomas Hobart of Little Plumpstead, Norfolk, the nephew of Sir Henry Hobart, 1st Baronet, of Blickling Hall (died 1623).
- Frances Hopton, (?) married (1) Rice Jones, of Asthall, Oxford (died 1615), and (2) Sir Giles Fettiplace of Poulton, Wiltshire (died 1641).
- Anne Hopton, married Richard Cole of Nailsea Court, Somerset (both died 1650).
- Rachel Hopton, married ----- Thomas of Herefordshire.
- Jane Hopton, married Richard Bingham of Melcombe Horsey, Dorset.
- Philadelphia Hopton, married Sir John Ernley, of Whetham House, Calne, Wiltshire.
- Margaret Hopton, married (1) Sir John Rogers of Bryanston, Dorset (died 1613), and (2) Sir Robert Banister of Passenham, Northamptonshire.

Parliament of England
Preceded by Robert Hare; Robert Coppyn	Member of Parliament for Dunwich; 1571 to 1572; With: William Humberston	Succeeded by Robert Coppyn; Richard Sone
Preceded by Sir Robert Jermyn; Sir John Heigham	Member of Parliament for Suffolk; 1588 to 1589; With: Anthony Wingfield	Succeeded by Edmund Bacon; Sir Clement Heigham
