= Owen Hopton =

English politician (c.1519–1595)

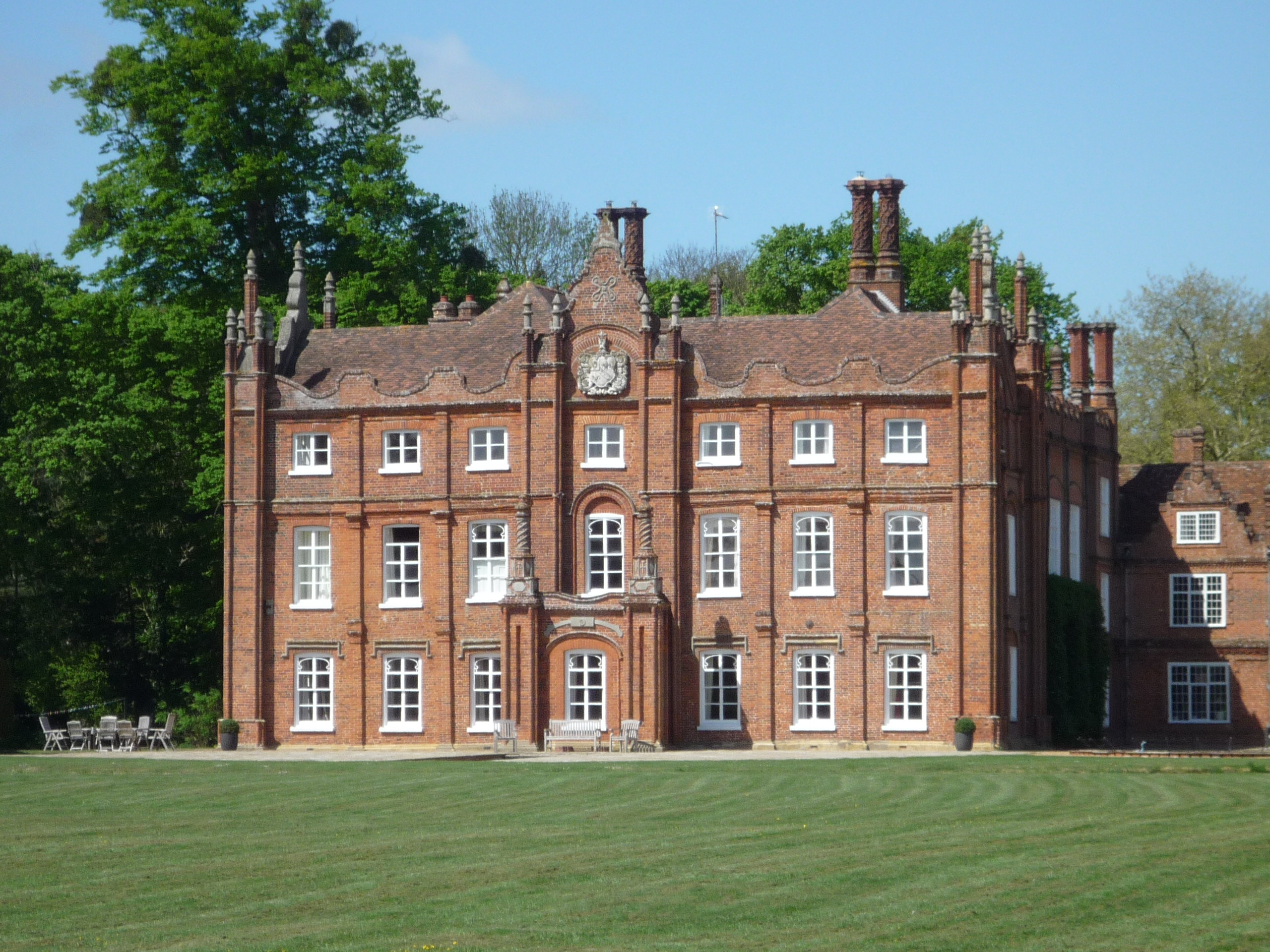
Cockfield Hall, Suffolk - seat of the Hopton family

Sir Owen Hopton (c. 1519 – 1595) was an English provincial landowner, administrator and MP, and was Lieutenant of the Tower of London from c. 1570 to 1590.

== Early career ==
Owen Hopton was the eldest son and heir of Sir Arthur Hopton of Cockfield Hall, Yoxford, Suffolk, and his wife Anne, daughter of Sir David Owen of Cowdray House at Midhurst in West Sussex (uncle to King Henry VII). The manor of Blythburgh was confirmed to him by royal grant at the time of his father's death in 1555. He first became Member of Parliament for Suffolk in 1559: he was dubbed Knight Bachelor at Smallbridge Hall, (Sir) William Waldgrave's house in Suffolk, in 1561. He was Sheriff of Norfolk and Suffolk for 1564.

== Lady Katherine Grey ==
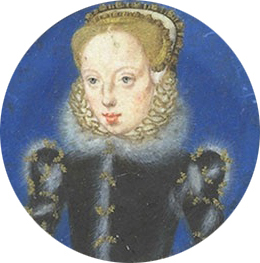
Portrait of Lady Katherine Grey

Sir Owen Hopton's kindly treatment of Lady Katherine Grey, when she was by command of Queen Elizabeth, 2 October 1567, kept prisoner at Cockfield Hall during the last months of her life, probably won him the trust afterwards reposed in him by that often untrusting sovereign. After two years in the Tower of London (where as Countess of Hertford she bore two sons), Lady Katherine had since August 1563 been successively in the custody of Sir John Grey of Pirgo (her uncle), Sir William Petre, and Sir John Wentworth of Gosfield Hall when (both Grey and Wentworth having died) Hopton brought her with her small company of servants to Yoxford on 20–21 October 1567.

Hopton wrote to Secretary Cecil on 11 January advising him that she was dangerously ill. Suffering from consumption, she died on 27 January 1567/68. Sir Owen was at her deathbed and received from her three rings to deliver to her husband, and a supplication for mercy towards her husband and children, which she bound him to deliver in person to Her Majesty. At Her Majesty's command, Hopton arranged a suitable heraldic funeral for her in the Cockfield chapel of Yoxford church: the expenses for her journey, her board and her funeral (£140) and for the Herald's charges and costs (£79) were refunded to Sir Owen from the royal coffers. Meals and lodgings were provided for 77 mourners.

== Lieutenant of the Tower ==
In 1571 Hopton was senior Knight of the Shire for Suffolk, with Thomas Seckford. Hopton owed his position at the Tower of London (which he was found to discharge efficiently) to the "good meanes and favour" of William Cecil (who became Lord Burghley in 1571), and received a salary of £200 per annum. He was in charge of the most significant prisoners of the age, including particularly the Duke of Norfolk and his associates. His written request survives, to the Earl of Leicester and Lord Burghley of 2 June 1572, for directions as to the beheaded Duke's burial ("whose dead corse remayneth in the church here, unburyed"), and there in the church of St Peter ad Vincula the Duke's grave was made.

Hopton supervised the conduct of examinations of prisoners, and served and advised the Privy Council directly. Due to his role he was fully involved in the government's actions against Catholics. He figured strongly in the 1581 confinement, interrogations and torture of Edmund Campion (whom he at first confined in "Little Ease"), eager to help win the political prize of Campion's conversion and proposing strategies to achieve it, yet lacking the imagination to realise that coercion, menaces and inducements would only strengthen Campion's purpose and resolve. When certain prisoners were to be tortured, he received instructions and could be relied upon to supervise the procedure or conduct it himself, according to his own discretion.

As one of the high commissioners for causes ecclesiastical, in 1582 he was signatory to a directive from the Privy Council for public readings of Christopher Ocland's Anglorum Praelia. During the 1580s he fell into controversy with the Lord Mayor and Citizenry of London by his refusal of their writs of Habeas Corpus issued against the officers and attendants of the Tower, disputing with the city the jurisdiction of the "Queen's Verge". He also controlled the armoury. In 1583-1584 his daughter Cicely, being apparently in love with the recusant John Stonard, carried "letters and credit of importance" between prisoners in the Tower and the Marshalsea Prison. It was observed, "Much could be learnt from her examination of the plans of [George] Throckmarton and [Jervais] Pierpoint". In a letter to Burghley of 1588 he describes his conduct of the office during more than 18 years, and the discipline and liberality which he has brought to the organization and duties of the Yeoman Warders, including the uses of the livery.

== Suffolk dignitary ==
He was again Member of Parliament for Suffolk in 1571, for Middlesex (1572 and 1584) and for Arundel (1589). By Indenture of 1585, with Owen Tasburgh (his wife's kinsman), he levied a fine on his manors of Blythburgh, Westwood, Walberswick, Hinton, Westhall and Thorington, with appurtenant lands also in Westleton, Darsham, Wenhaston and elsewhere, granting seisin thereof to Edmund Hall and William Roberts, for the sole use and benefit of his son and heir Arthur Hopton of Charterhouse, Somerset.

Sir Owen was remembered favourably by the people of Walberswick in later times, when the Brooke family deprived them of their rights over the common and at Paulsfen. At two hearings, in 1642 and 1654, before judges Littleton and Phesant, Suffolk voices were raised to recall the more liberal behaviour of the Hoptons:

"...they would speak of the Previlidge they had in Sir Owen Hopton's Dayes, who was Lord of the Mannor before the Brookes cam to it..." (the witnesses) "spoake boldly to the judge Fessant, and tould him, that in Sir Owen Hopton's Dayes they had nooe such Dooinge, for he was a worthie Jentleman, and loved the poore Towne, and joyed the Previlidge they had by ther Common; and Robert Dourant, who was the Townes Neattards Boy in Sir Owen Hopton's dayes, have often sayd, that Sir Owen him selfe have com downe from his West-Wood-Lodge to Paules-Fenn, and had him com up to the Lodge and drynke, so that it was otherwise in those Days, than have been since."

== Death ==
He died in 1595 and was buried at Stepney. His widow Anne Hopton died in 1599 and was buried at Wroxton, Oxfordshire, by Wroxton Abbey, the home of her daughter Anne, Countess of Downe.

== Family ==
Sir Owen Hopton married Anne Echyngham, the elder daughter and coheiress of Sir Edward Echyngham and Ann Everard. They had the following children:

- (Sir) Arthur Hopton (died 1607), of Blythburgh, and of Witham Friary, Somerset, father to Sir Arthur Hopton, ambassador to Spain.
- William Hopton, Esquire; living in 1600 when he brought suit against his brother Arthur for the manor of Langley Fitzures in Kington St Michael, Wiltshire.
- Ralph Hopton, died without issue.
- George Hopton, died without issue.
- Anne Hopton, married (1) Henry Wentworth, 3rd Baron Wentworth (1558–1593), by whom she was mother of Thomas Wentworth, 1st Earl of Cleveland, and (2) William Pope, 1st Earl of Downe, of Wroxton Abbey, Oxfordshire (died 1631).
- Mary Hopton, married William Brydges, 4th Baron Chandos.
- Cecilie Hopton, married Sir George Marshall of Putney.
