= Easton Bavents =

Coastal hamlet in Suffolk, England

Coordinates: 52.338°N 1.686°E

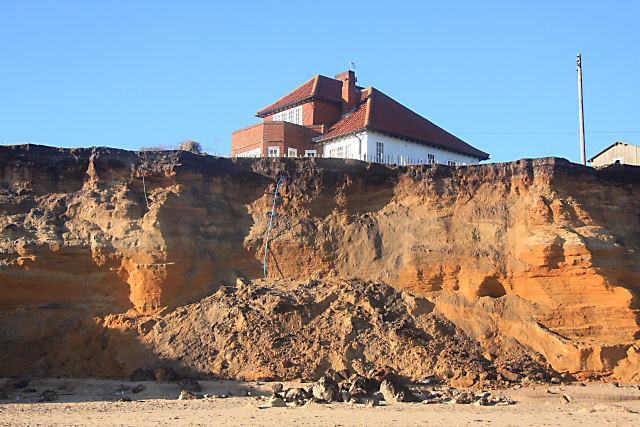
- Cliff fall at Easton Bavents, December 2008

- Location within Suffolk
- OS grid reference: TM512775
- Civil parish: Reydon
- District: East Suffolk
- Shire county: Suffolk
- Region: East
- Country: England
- Sovereign state: United Kingdom
- Post town: SOUTHWOLD
- Postcode district: IP18
- Dialling code: 01502
- Police: Suffolk
- Fire: Suffolk
- Ambulance: East of England
- UK Parliament: Suffolk Coastal

Easton Bavents is a hamlet and former civil parish, now in the parish of Reydon, in the East Suffolk district of the county of Suffolk, England. Once an important village with a market, it has been much eroded by the North Sea. A map of Suffolk dating from about 1610 shows it to have been the most easterly ecclesiastical parish in England. It is now confined to a stretch of the Suffolk coast to the east of Reydon. In 1961 the parish had a population of 23.

== History ==
The place-name Easton Bavents is first attested in the Domesday Book of 1086, where it appears as Estuna. It takes the form Eston Bavent in the Charter Rolls of 1330. The first part of the name means "eastern settlement". The Feudal Aids of 1316 show that the village was then held by Thomas de Bavent, Bavent being a place near Caen in Normandy.

Medieval Easton Bavents was a parish of some importance, granted a weekly market in the 14th century, with a three-day fair on the feast day of St Nicholas of Myra (6 December). Records show the parish church, dedicated to St Nicholas, was still in use in 1639, and a rector appointed as late as 1666. However, the cliff on which the village was built collapsed. The church itself seems to have sunk under the sea in the latter part of the 17th century. A chapel dedicated to St Margaret the Virgin also disappeared.

The Battle of Solebay in the Third Anglo-Dutch War took place in 1672 off the coast of Easton Bavents, which survived as a fishing village until the 19th century. The continuing erosion of the cliffs makes the area a popular, albeit hazardous area for fossil hunters, who approach it along the beach from Southwold.

The pace of erosion has averaged some 3 metres a year since 1945, although storms and high tides increase the rate. The last three terraced houses on the cliff edge were demolished in January 2020. Author Juliet Blaxland wrote a memoir about living in one of them. Called The Easternmost House, it was published in 2019 and nominated for the Wainwright Prize. On 1 April 1987 the parish was abolished and merged with Reydon.

== Residual population ==
Year	Population
1801	17
1901	16
1971	19
2020	14

== See also ==
- Covehithe
- Dunwich
