= Westleton =

Village in Suffolk, England

Coordinates: 52.264982°N 1.575395°E

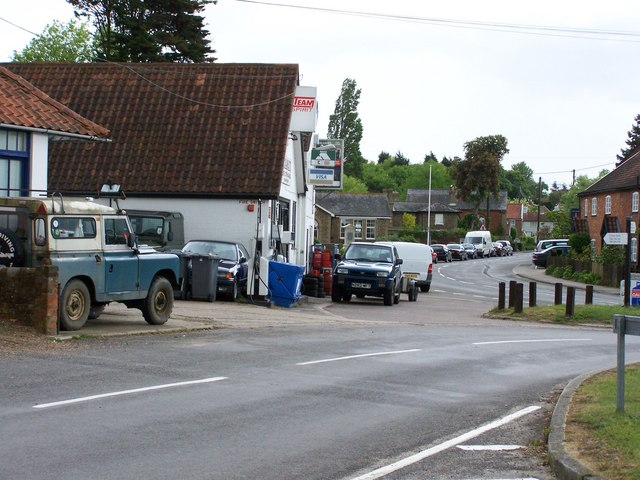
- Westleton village

- Location within Suffolk
- Population: 349 (2011)
- District: East Suffolk
- Shire county: Suffolk
- Region: East
- Country: England
- Sovereign state: United Kingdom
- Post town: Saxmundham
- Postcode district: IP17
- UK Parliament: Suffolk Coastal

Westleton is a village and civil parish in the English county of Suffolk. It is located 4 miles (6 km) north of Leiston and 5 miles (8 km) north-east of Saxmundham near the North Sea coast. The village is on the edge of the Suffolk Sandlings, an area of lowland heathland. The village lies along the B1125 road, 2 miles (3 km) to the east of the A12 and Darsham railway station.

Westleton Heath National Nature Reserve is 0.5 miles (1 km) north east of the village. The heath is crossed by a minor road from Westleton to the coastal village of Dunwich, 2 miles (3 km) to the east. The famous Minsmere RSPB reserve lies immediately to the east of the village.

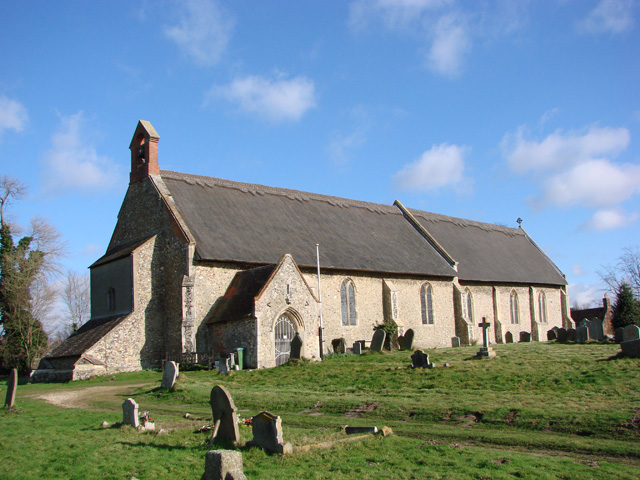
St Peter's church

The fourteenth-century village church of St Peter in Westleton was built by monks from Sibton Abbey near Saxmundham. The church has twice seen the collapse of its tower: in 1776 under the strain of hurricane winds; and during World War II, when the smaller wooden replacement had to be demolished following bomb damage. It is a grade II* listed building.

Westleton retains some other basic services, helped by its proximity to the coast and Minsmere. These include a post office, two bookshops, a garage and two pubs, the White Horse and The Crown. The latter is a historic coaching inn dating from the 12th century.

Westleton Primitive Methodist chapel was opened in 1868 and closed in 1968. Now used as a bookshop, Chapel Books, it has been depicted in print in Julie Myerson's 2003 novel, Something Might Happen, as the location for a seduction scene.
