= Cornelisz =

Cornelisz is a given name. Notable people with the name include:

- Adriaen Cornelisz van Linschoten (1590–1677), Dutch Golden Age painter
- Charles Cornelisz. de Hooch (1600–1638), Dutch Golden Age landscape painter
- Claes Cornelisz. Moeyaert, also known as Claes Corneliszoon Moeyaert (1592–1655), authoritative Catholic Dutch painter
- Cornelis Cornelisz, also known as Cornelis van Haarlem, (1562–1638), Dutch Golden Age painter and draughtsman
- Cornelis Cornelisz Kunst (1493–1544), Dutch Renaissance painter
- Cornelisz Vroom, also known as Cornelis Vroom, (1591–1661), Dutch Golden Age landscape painter
- Hendrick Cornelisz. van Vliet (1611–1675), Dutch Golden Age painter remembered mostly for his church interiors
- Hendrick Cornelisz Vroom (1562–1640),) was a Dutch Golden Age painter credited with being the founder of Dutch marine art or seascape painting
- Jacob Cornelisz. van Neck (1564–1638), Dutch naval officer and explorer who led the second Dutch expedition to Indonesia from 1598 to 1599
- Jacob Cornelisz van Oostsanen (1470–1533), Northern Netherlandish designer of woodcuts and painter
- Jan Cornelisz Vermeyen, or Jan Mayo, or Barbalonga (1500–1559), Dutch Northern Renaissance painter
- Jeronimus Cornelisz (1598–1629), Frisian apothecary and Dutch East India Company (VOC) merchant
- Johannes Cornelisz Verspronck (1600–1662), gifted Dutch Golden Age portraitist
- Joost Cornelisz Droochsloot or Droogsloot (1586–1666), Dutch Golden Age painter
- Lucas Cornelisz de Kock or Kunst (1495–1552), Dutch Renaissance painter active in the Tudor court
- Pieter Cornelisz Hooft, also known as Pieter Corneliszoon Hooft, (1581–1647), Dutch historian, poet and playwright from the Dutch Golden Age
- Pieter Cornelisz Kunst (1484–1560), Dutch Renaissance painter
- Pieter Cornelisz Plockhoy van Zierikzee, also known as Pieter Corneliszoon Plockhoy, (1625–1670), Dutch Mennonite and Collegiant utopist
- Pieter Cornelisz van Rijck (1567–1637), Dutch Golden Age painter
- Pieter Cornelisz van Slingelandt (1640–1691), Dutch Golden Age portrait painter
- Pieter Cornelisz van Soest (1600–1620), Dutch marine artist, especially prolific in battle-pieces
- Pieter Cornelisz Verbeeck (1610–1654), Dutch Golden Age painter
- Willem Cornelisz. van Muyden (1573–1634), early 17th century mariner
- Willem Cornelisz Duyster (1599–1635), Dutch Golden Age painter from Amsterdam

== See also ==
- Cornelia (disambiguation)
- Cornelianus
- Cornelis (disambiguation)
- Cornelisse
- Cornelissen
- Corneliszoon
- Cornelius (disambiguation)
