= Cornelissen =

Cornelissen is a Dutch patronymic surname meaning "son of Cornelis". It may refer to:

- Adelinde Cornelissen (born 1979), Dutch dressage rider
- Christiaan Cornelissen (1864–1942), Dutch syndicalist writer, economist, trade unionist, and anarchist
- Dien Cornelissen (1924–2015), Dutch politician
- Ko Cornelissen (1904–1954), Dutch boxer
- Louis Cornelissen (1817/18–1889), Flemish-born British lithographer
- Marie Cornelissen (1850–1921), French-born English painter, daughter of Louis
- Marije Cornelissen (born 1974), Dutch politician
- Pam Cornelissen (1934–2020), Dutch politician
- Peter Cornelissen, pseudonym of Fritz-Otto Busch (1890–1971), German naval writer
- Ronald Cornelissen (born 1964), Dutch Roman Catholic clergyman
- Ton Cornelissen (born 1964), Dutch footballer

== See also ==
- Cornelisse
- L. Cornelissen & Son, London art supplies shop founded in 1855 by Louis
