= Peter Eugene Ball =

English sculptor

- Born: Coventry, England
- Known for: Sculptor
- Notable work: Christus Rex (Southwell Minster), Pietà (Winchester Cathedral), Virgin and Child (Southwark Cathedral)

Peter Eugene Ball is a sculptor. He is best known for his religious work which can be seen in churches and cathedrals throughout Britain. He also produces secular sculpture using predominantly driftwood and found objects.

== Biography ==
Born on 19 March 1943 in Coventry, Warwickshire, Peter Eugene Ball attended Coventry College of Art from 1957 until 1962 where he obtained the National Diploma of Design. By 1963 his sculptures were already included in mixed exhibitions in the Midlands and at the Marjorie Parr Gallery, London, where he had his first one-man exhibition in 1967. However, it wasn't until 1968 that making sculpture became his full-time occupation, and since that time he has devoted himself to producing both religious work for churches and cathedrals throughout the country and exhibiting and selling his secular work in galleries across Europe and in America.

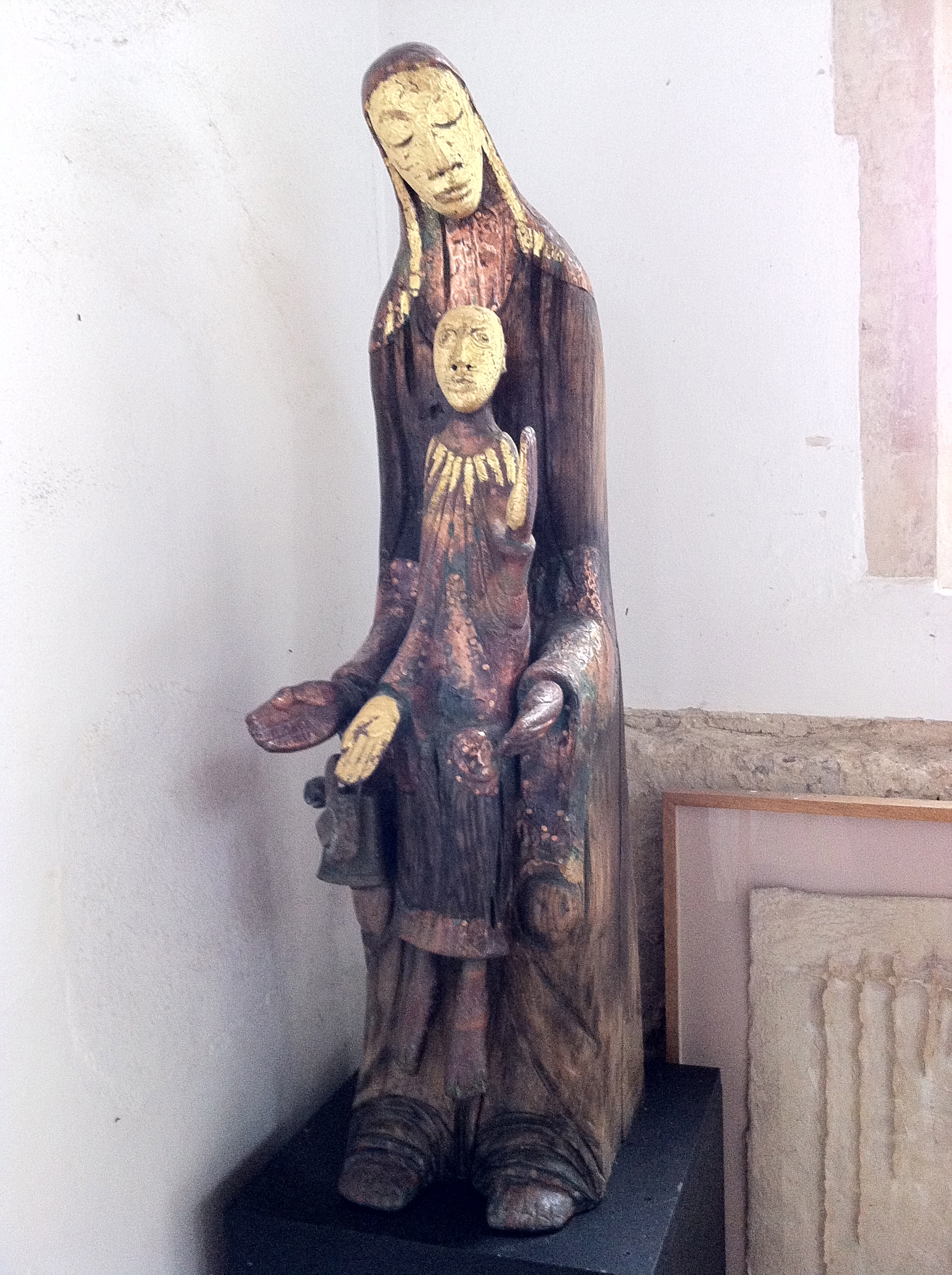
Blessed Virgin Mary in Holy Trinity Church, Blythburgh

== Books ==
- A Kind of Madness (The Sculptures of Peter Eugene Ball), Inga Gilbert
- Icons of The Invisible God (Selected Sculptures of Peter Eugene Ball), foreword by Pamela Tudor-Craig, introduction by Richard Davey
