= L. Cornelissen & Son =

London art supplies shop

Coordinates: 51.5175°N 0.1290°W

- Industry: Retailer
- Founded: 1855; 171 years ago in London, England
- Founder: Louis Cornelissen
- Products: Art supplies
- Website: www.cornelissen.com

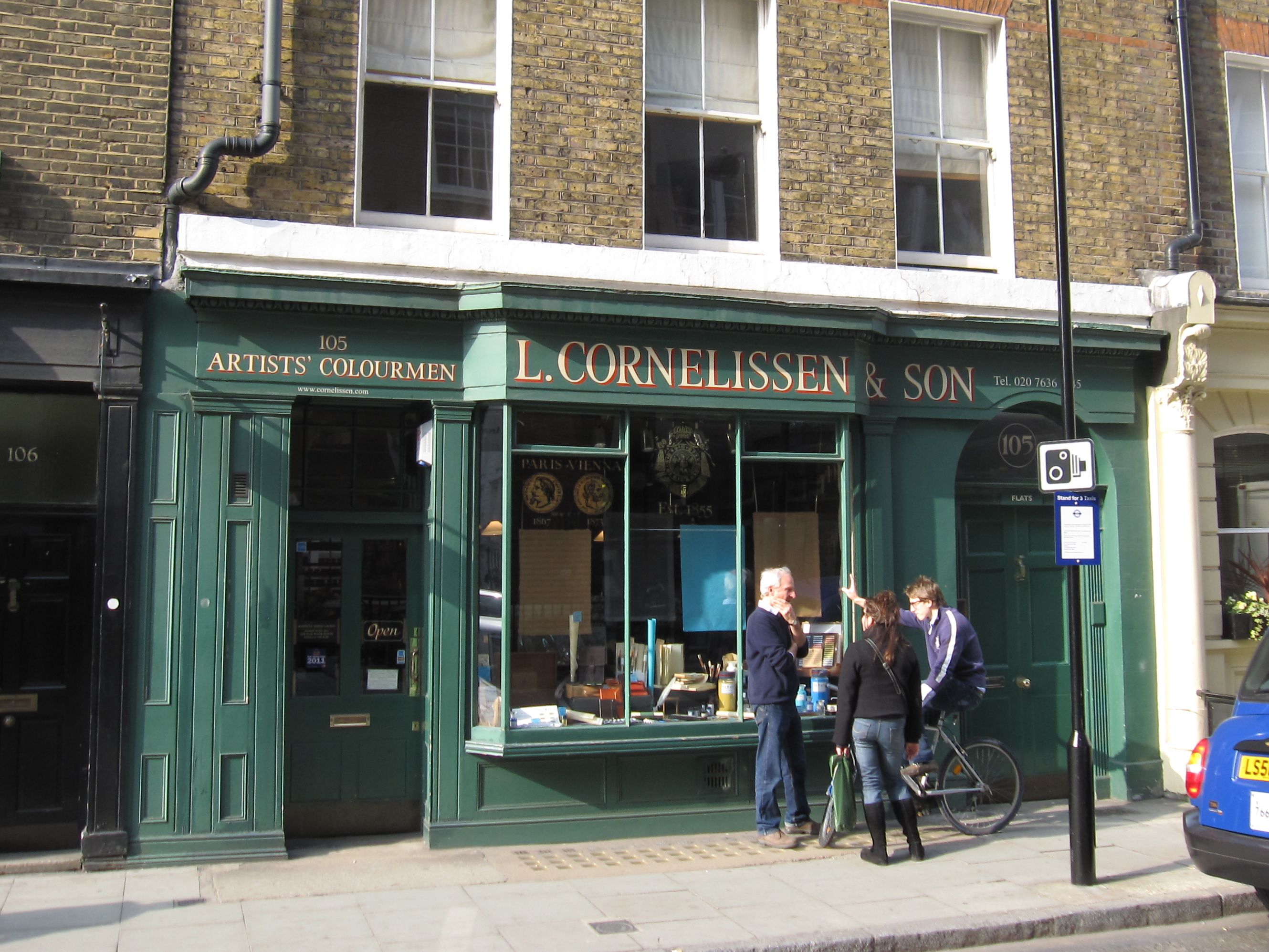
L. Cornelissen & Son in Great Russell Street in 2011

L. Cornelissen & Son is a London art supplies shop founded in 1855 by Louis Cornelissen, from a Flemish family of lithographers.

The shop was located at 22 Great Queen Street from 1861 to 1987.

It is now located at 105 Great Russell Street in London's Bloomsbury district.

The last Cornelissen family member working in the business died in 1977, and the shop closed. Stavros Mihalarias, a Greek restorer of Orthodox icons and Cornelissen customer spoke with his friend Nicholas Walt about how they might save the shop. They reopened it in 1979, and moved to the current premises in 1988.
