= Holy Trinity Church, Blythburgh =

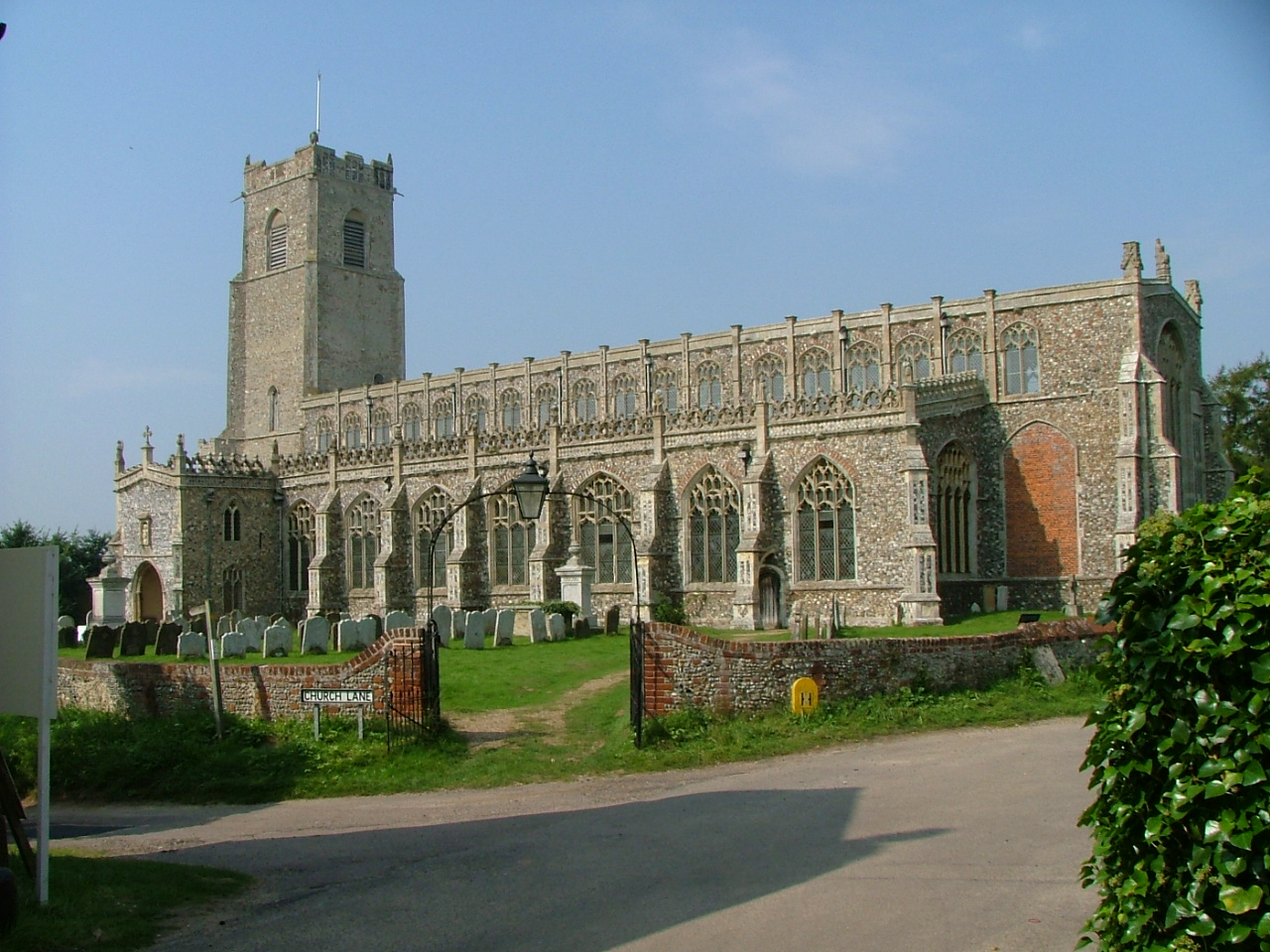
- Holy Trinity Church
- Holy Trinity Church, Blythburgh
- 52°19′16.21″N 1°35′41.14″E
- Location: Blythburgh
- Country: England
- Denomination: Church of England

History
- Dedication: Holy Trinity

Architecture
- Heritage designation: Grade I listed

Specifications
- Length: 128 feet (39 m)
- Height: 83 feet (25 m)

Administration
- Province: Canterbury
- Diocese: Diocese of St Edmundsbury and Ipswich
- Archdeaconry: Suffolk
- Deanery: Halesworth
- Parish: Blythburgh

The Holy Trinity Church is the parish church of the village of Blythburgh in the East Suffolk district, in the county of Suffolk, England. It is part of the Church of England Halesworth deanery in the Diocese of St Edmundsbury and Ipswich, and has been listed Grade I on the National Heritage List for England since December 1966.

Holy Trinity Church should not be confused with the nearby ruins of Blythburgh Priory.

== History ==
=== Early origins and medieval period ===
The parish church is dedicated to the Holy Trinity and known as the "Cathedral of the Marshes". Blythburgh was one of the earliest Christian sites in East Anglia. There was a church there in 654 to which the bodies of the East Anglian king Anna and his son Jurmin, descendants of King Wehha, were brought after their deaths in battle at Bulcamp with the Mercian King Penda.

At the time of the Norman Conquest in 1066, Blythburgh was part of the royal estate and had one of the richest churches in Suffolk, possibly a Saxon minster, with two daughter churches. It was probably the rich parent church that was granted by king Henry I to Augustinian canons sometime between 1116 and 1147, becoming the priory of the Blessed Virgin Mary.

A daughter church is likely to have been the predecessor of Holy Trinity. It was rebuilt in the 15th century. In the movement to dissolve the monasteries, the suppression of Blythburgh Priory (which had its own conventual church) was authorised in 1528 and it was dissolved in 1537, the reversion of the property being granted to local gentleman Sir Arthur Hopton in 1548.

=== Damage and upheaval ===
The church underwent a series of disasters, both man-made and natural. The most dramatic of the latter variety came on Sunday 4 August 1577, when a storm hit the area, and during morning service lightning hit the church, "cleft the door, and returning to the steeple rent the timber, [and] brake the chimes". The falling spire damaged the font and the roof, which was not repaired until 1782, destroying the angels in the west end bays. The door shows marks, which have the appearance of burns caused by candle flames. They have been associated with the "Black Shuck" legend, and this has been used as a title of a song by the Lowestoft rock group The Darkness, which mentions Blythburgh in the lyrics.

During the 17th century Holy Trinity was badly damaged when Parliament set out to remove what the Puritans deemed to be "superstitious ornamentation" from churches; Blythburgh was assigned to William Dowsing, a local Puritan, and on 8 April 1644 he went to the church and ordered the removal of "twenty superstitious pictures, one on the outside of the church; two crosses, one on the porch and another on the steeple; and twenty cherubim to be taken down in the church and chancel... and gave order to take down above 200 more within eight days".

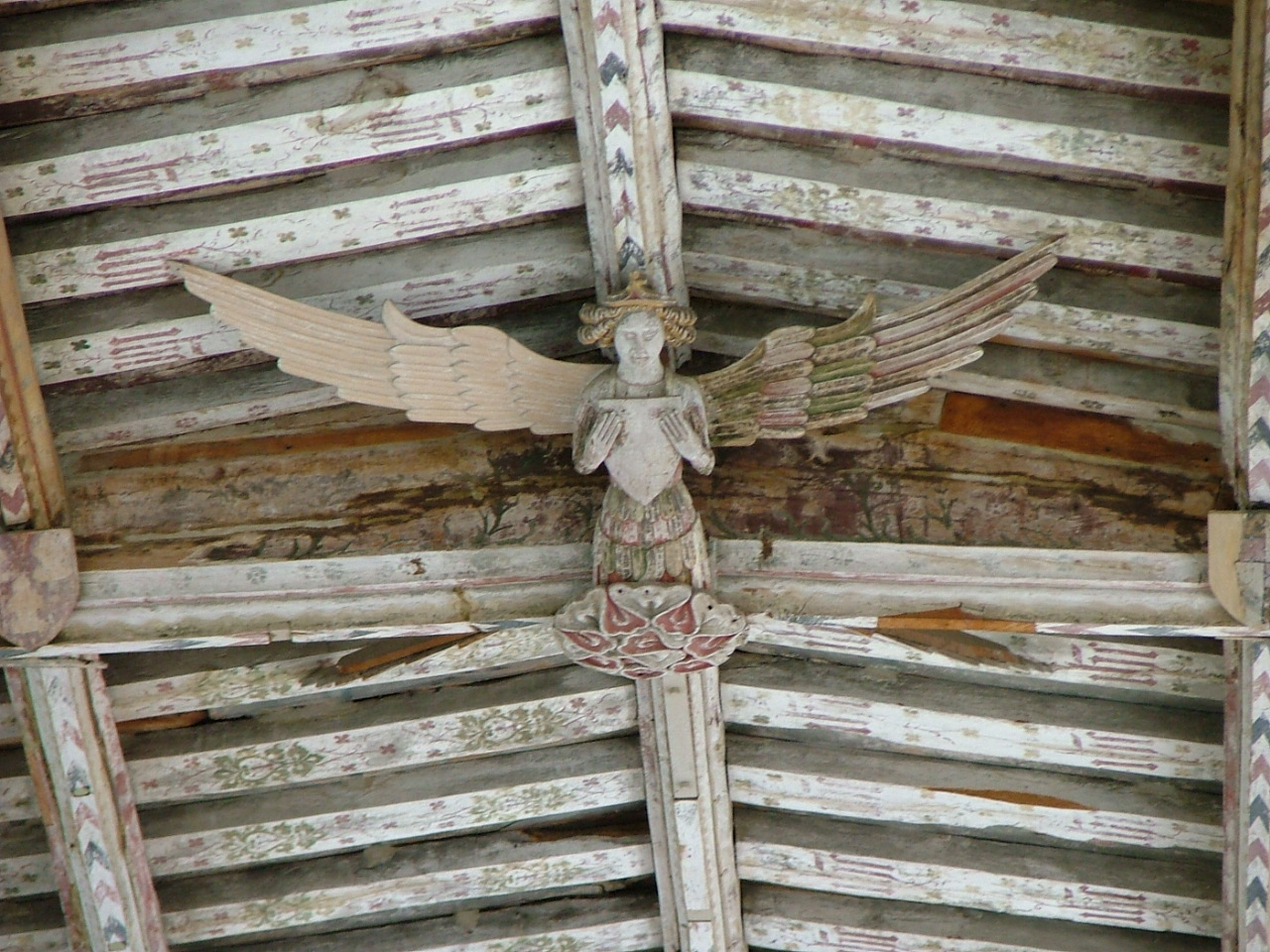
Angel from the ceiling of Holy Trinity Church

General neglect also played its part in the church's deterioration, resulting in part from rural poverty, and in part from the rise of Methodism – a Primitive Methodist chapel was founded in the village in the 1830s.

=== Restoration and 19th-century repair ===
By the late 19th century, the church was in a very poor state of repair, and in 1881 a restoration fund made possible the repair of the church, and then its maintenance after its reopening in 1884. The restoration was controversial with William Morris and his Society for the Protection of Ancient Buildings opposed to the radical plans of the local building committee. Shortage of funds restricted the work that could be done. While the fabric was repaired, modern taste ruled out any return to the 15th-century colour scheme of the church; the thirty-six angels, set back to back in pairs on the arch-braced, firred, tie-beam roof had been brightly painted in red and green with much use made of tin foil and gold leaf. A modern reproduction is mounted above the south door.

=== Architecture and fittings ===
The church has a two-manual pipe organ by the company Bishop and Son, dating from 1951, which was almost completely rebuilt in 2003 by Rodney Briscoe. A specification of the organ can be found on the National Pipe Organ Register.

The church is noted as having a jack o' the clock, dated 1682. In 1840 this was standing on a ladder in the tower arch and it chimed the hours. Beneath it was this inscription : "As the hours pass away, So doth the life of man decay."

The Jack now stands on a shelf near the organ and is rung to signal the start of services.

=== Music and cultural significance ===
In 1962 the acoustic value of the building was discovered by Benjamin Britten, and some of the concerts of the Aldeburgh Festival have been performed in the church.

The church was the location of a 2011 music video for Sempiterna by Libera.

There is a single Commonwealth War Graves Commission grave in the churchyard, that of a British sailor of the Second World War; Leading Cook Reginald George Arthur Remblance, of the Royal Naval Patrol Service's H.M.S. Ben Roy, who died in October 1944 at the age of 31.

== Parish status ==
The Parish of Blythburgh is part of the Sole Bay Team Ministry, along with the Parishes of:

- St Margaret of Antioch's Church, Reydon
- St Andrew's Church, Sotherton
- St Lawrence Church, South Cove
- St Edmund's Church, Southwold
- St Mary's Church, Uggeshall
- St Andrew's Church, Walberswick
- St Peter and St Paul's Church, Wangford

== Gallery ==
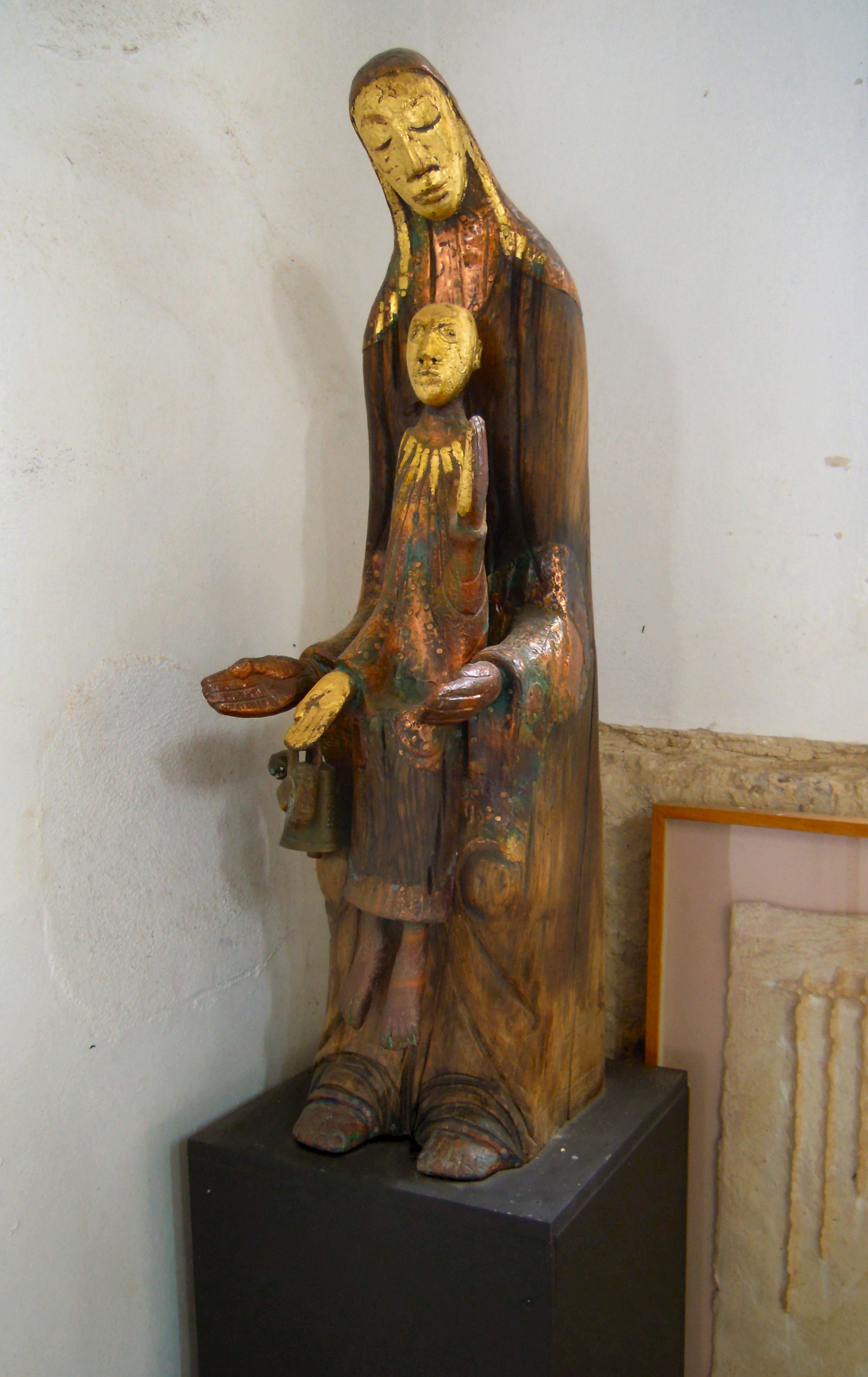
Madonna and Child by Peter Eugene Ball (1997)

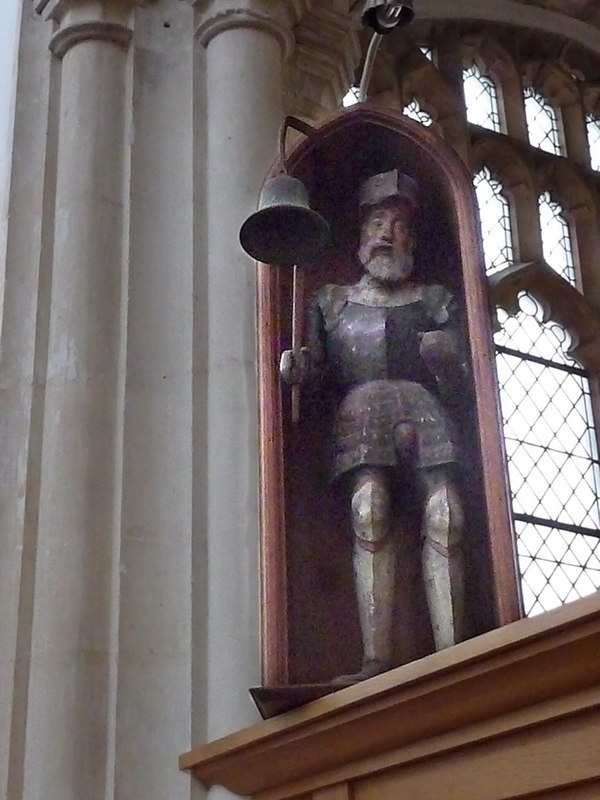
Clock jack of 1682

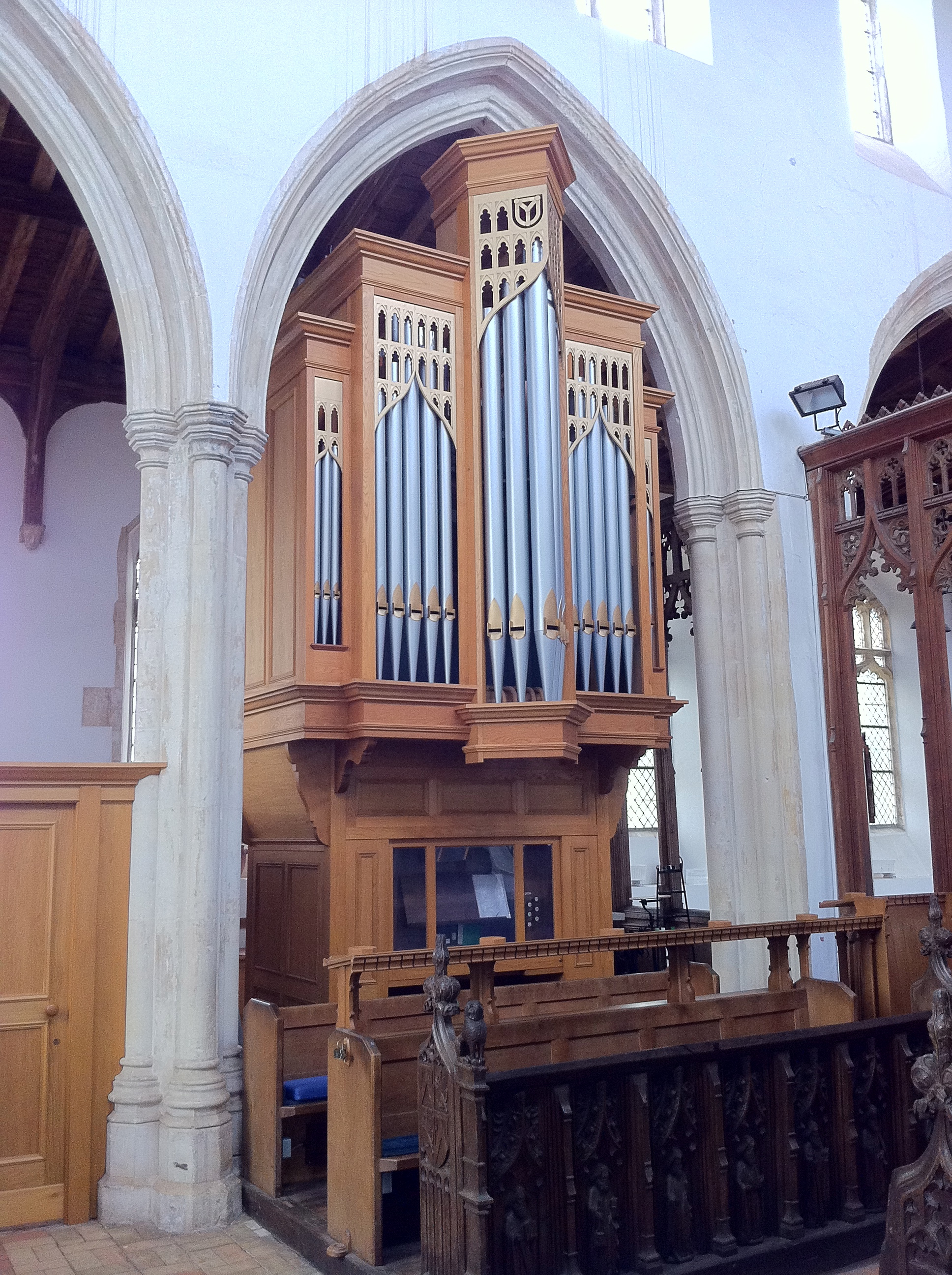
The organ, Holy Trinity Blythburgh

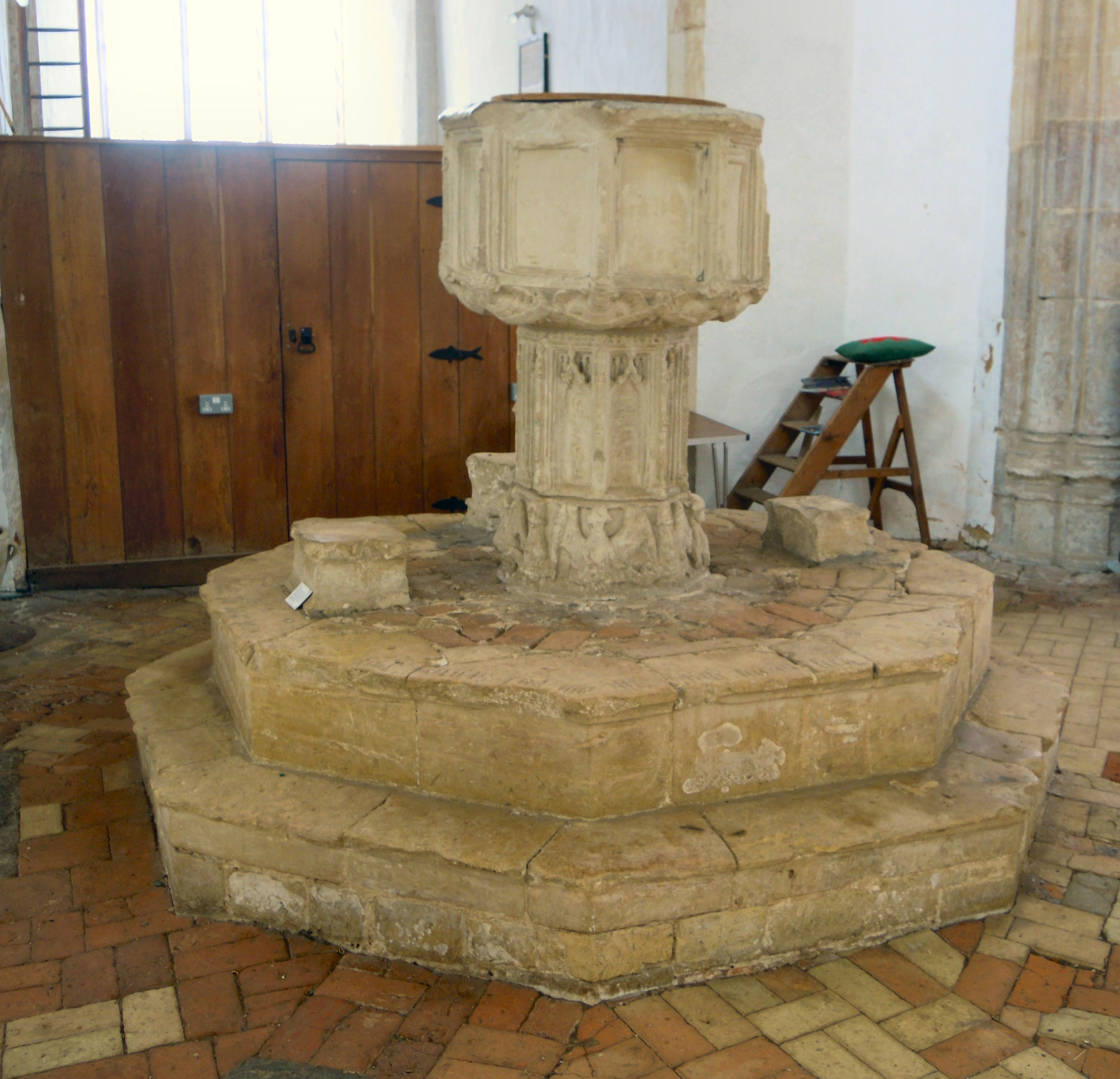
The Seven Sacrament font, which had its ornamentation destroyed by the Puritans.

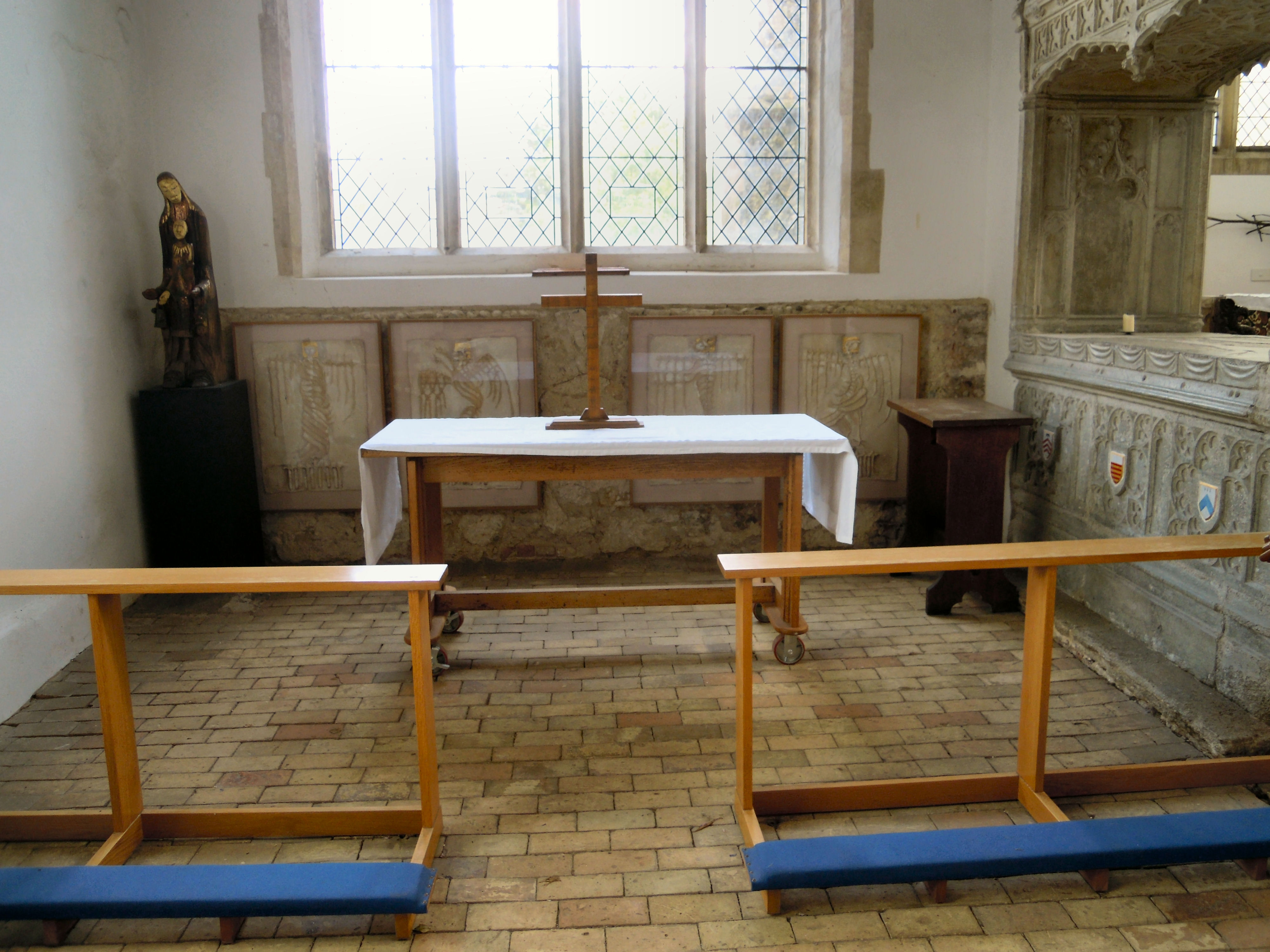
The Hopton Chapel

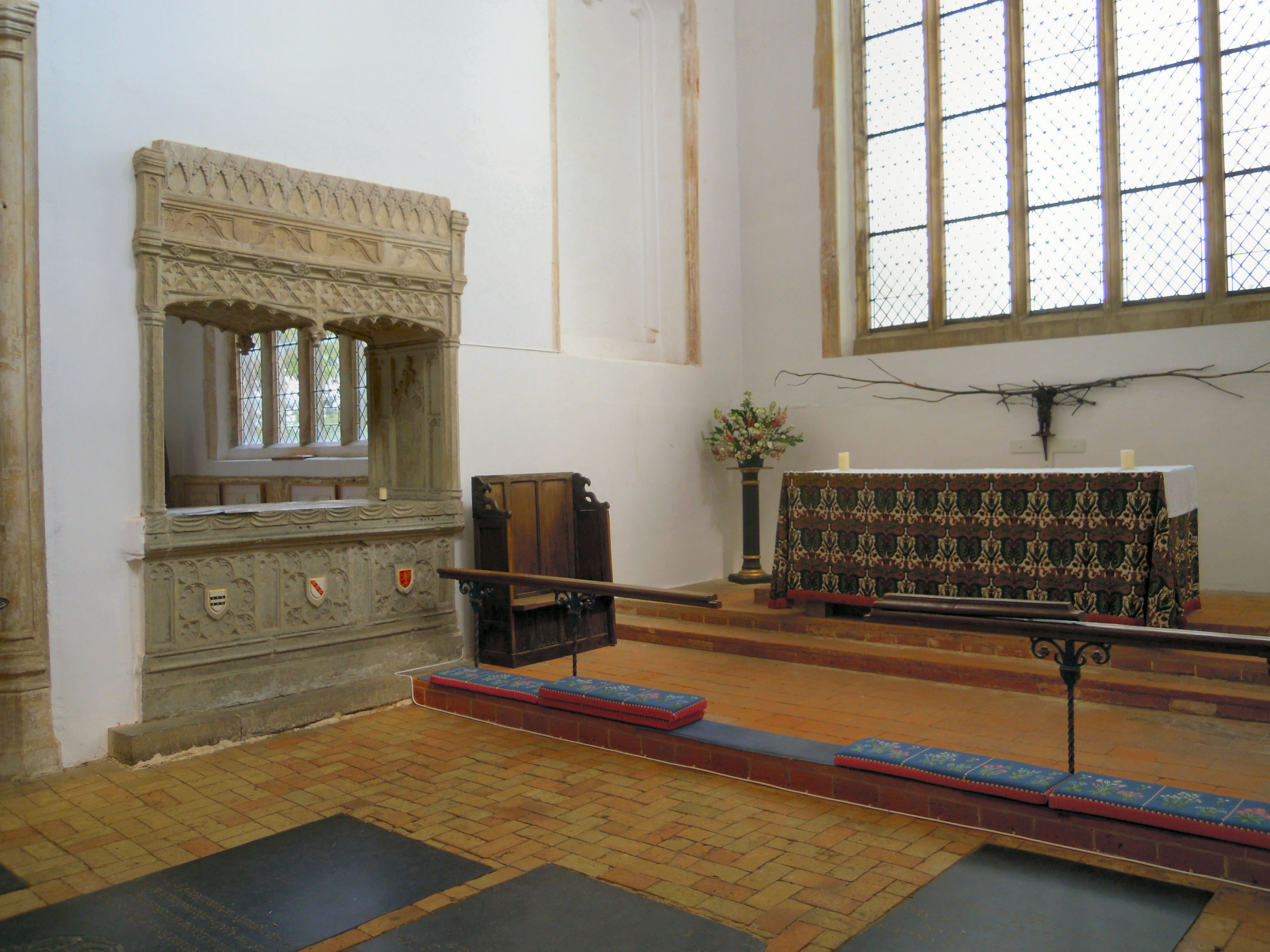
The altar in the chancel

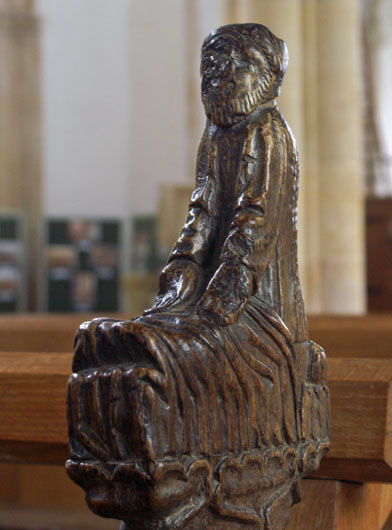
A poppy head pew end depicting Sloth

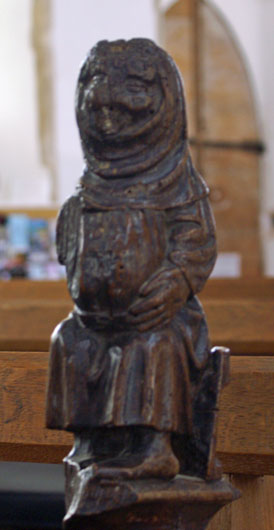
Poppy head depicting Gluttony

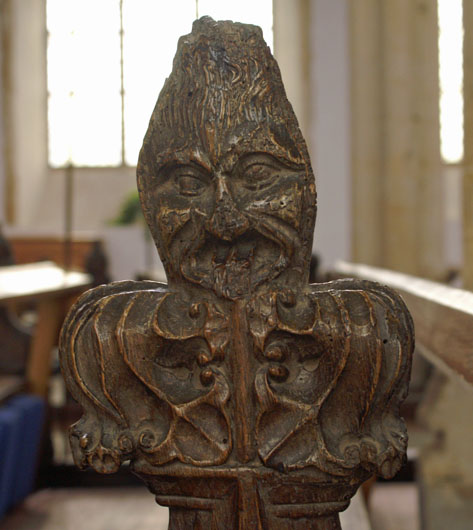
Poppy head depicting Slander

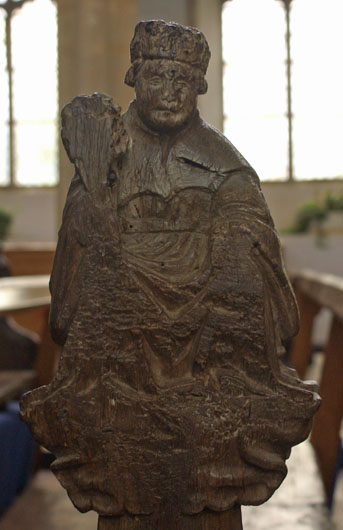
Poppy head depicting Summer

== Notable burials ==
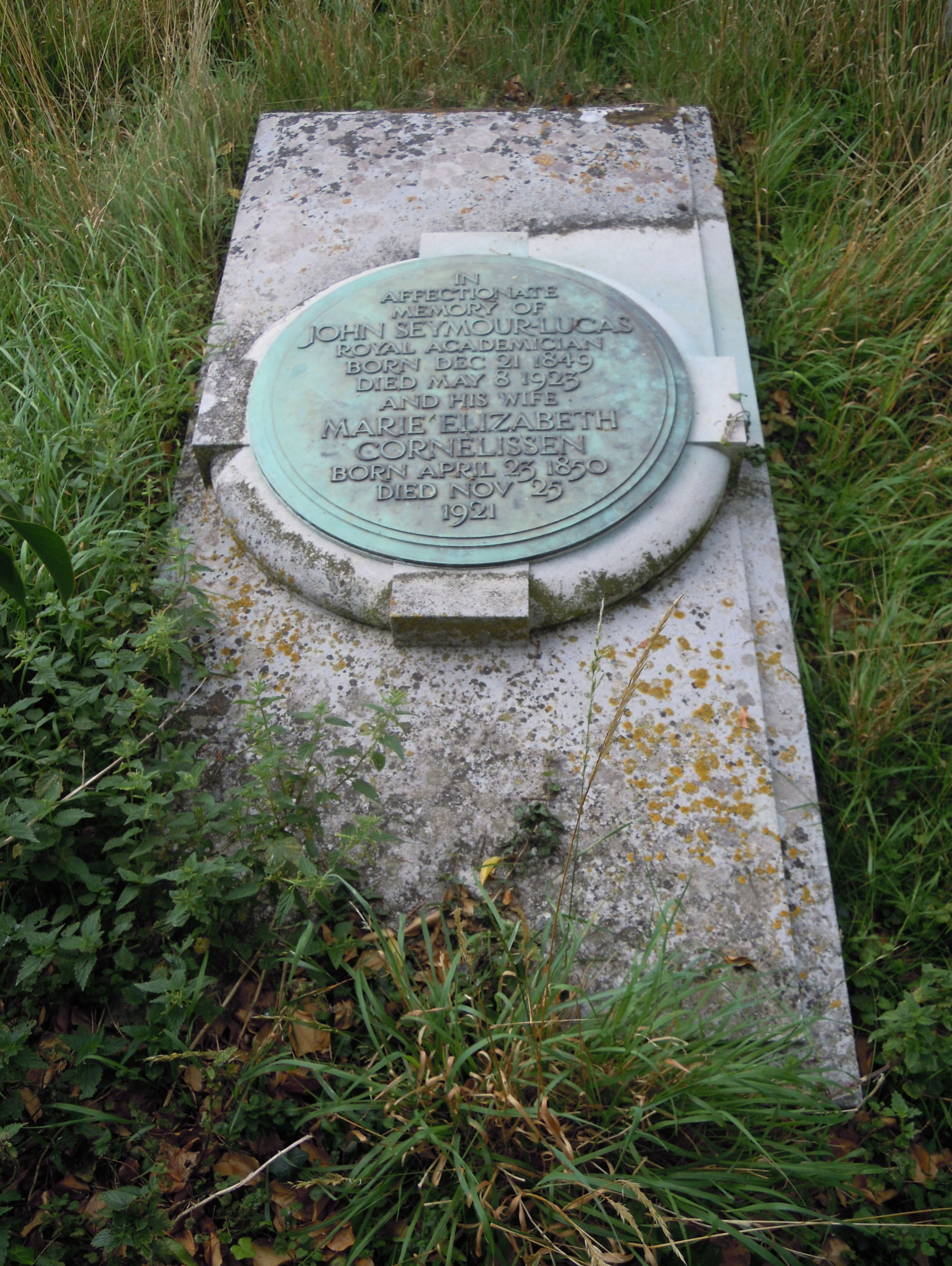
The grave of the Victorian artist John Seymour Lucas in the churchyard

- John Seymour Lucas RA (1849-1923), historical and portrait painter
- William Alwyn CBE (1905-1985), composer and conductor
