= St Edmund's Church, Southwold =

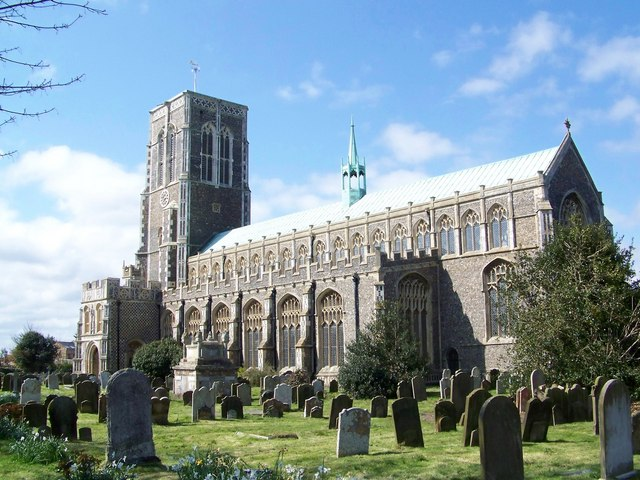
- St Edmund's Church, Southwold, with pre-2015 copper roof and flèche
- St Edmund's Church, Southwold
- 52°19′41.7″N 1°40′43.1″E
- OS grid reference: TM 50750 76388
- Location: Southwold
- Country: England
- Denomination: Church of England

History
- Dedication: St Edmund

Architecture
- Heritage designation: Grade I listed

Specifications
- Length: 144 feet (44 m)
- Width: 56 feet (17 m)
- Height: 96 feet (29 m)

Administration
- Diocese: Diocese of St Edmundsbury and Ipswich
- Archdeaconry: Suffolk
- Deanery: Waveney and Blyth
- Parish: Southwold

Clergy
- Rector: VACANT

St Edmund's Church, Southwold is a Grade I listed parish church in the Church of England in Southwold, Suffolk.

== History ==
The parish church of Southwold is dedicated to St Edmund, and is considered to be one of Suffolk's finest. It lies under one continuous roof, and was built over about 60 years from the 1430s to the 1490s; it replaced a smaller 13th-century church that was destroyed by fire. The earlier church dated from the time when Southwold was a small fishing hamlet adjacent to the larger Reydon. By the 15th century Southwold was an important town in its own right, and the church was rebuilt to match its power and wealth.

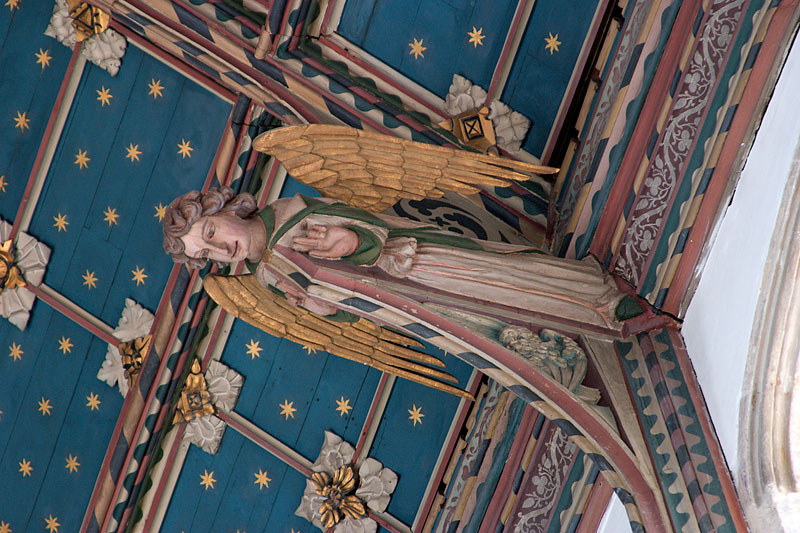
Angels in the ceiling

The church is renowned for its East Anglian flushwork, especially that of the tower. Knapped and unknapped flints are arranged in patterns, textures and designs and create the stone work. The curving letters over the west window are most famous: SCT. EDMUND ORA P. NOBIS (St Edmund pray for us). Each letter is crowned, and set in knapped flints. Originally roofed in lead, from 1948 to 2015 the church had a copper clad roof with an easily recognisable flèche (or spirelet), above a clerestory of eighteen windows. The flèche was purely for display, and has never contained a bell. The tower has no parapet and is a very fine piece of architecture, with its large bell openings. The roof of the nave is so high that it makes the tower seem shorter than it really is; but it is 96 feet (29 metres) high. All of the church's medieval glass was destroyed by William Dowsing in 1644; the only stained glass windows in the church are the east windows over the altar (1954, by Sir Ninian Comper) and the west window below the grand tower. In World War II the church was narrowly missed by a German bomb that destroyed houses in the nearby Hollyhock Square. The bomb did not do much damage to the building itself but blew out most of the windows - another reason why the church has very little stained glass. The church was tidied very quickly for the funerals, a short while later, of the people killed by the bomb.

In the interior, the rood screen is considered by many to be the finest in the county. It stretches all the way across the church, and is made up of three separate screens: a rood screen across the chancel arch and parclose screens across the north and south chancel aisles. A 15th century clock jack stands at the west end. He has an axe and bell which he uses to strike the time, and has a twin at Blythburgh. The Southwold jack is named "Southwold Jack", and is one of the symbols of the Adnams brewery. The font has been badly mutilated but is still very impressive with its large ornate cover. The roof in the chancel is painted and its height gives the church a very open feeling.

New Zealand-born glass artist John Hutton's 1971 engraved window depicting St Edmund at the moment of his death and martyrdom is located in the north chancel of the church.

Present-day church community life is extremely diverse and makes good use of St Edmund's Hall (also destroyed during the Second World War and rebuilt) to the rear of the church.

== Restorations ==
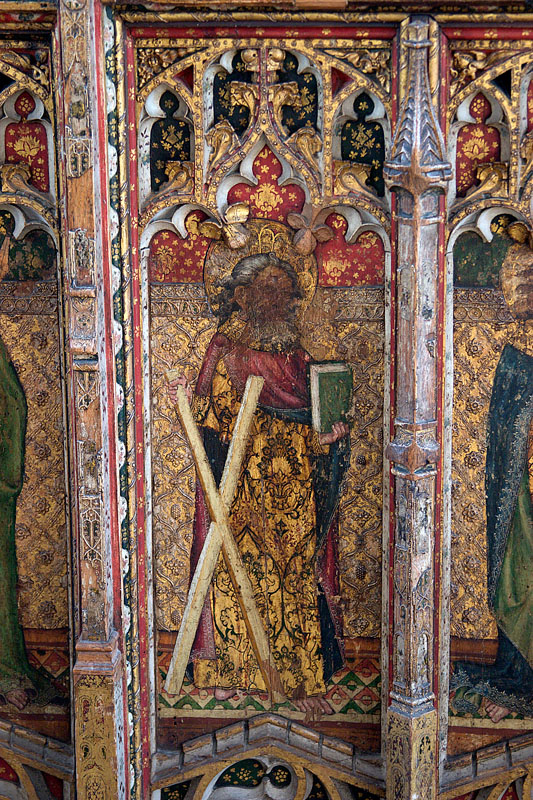
Detail from north side of the chancel screen

The roofs were restored in 1857 by Edward Lushington Blackburne and in 1866-1867 by Richard Phipson. The chancel was restored in 1885.

Following bomb damage to the lead roof during the Second World War, it was entirely replaced with copper in 1948. This covering degraded over time, partly due to the church's seaside environment, and it was decided in 2013 to reroof the entire church, including replacing the flèche, in lead.

The work began at the start of 2015, with completion later in that year.

The flagpole atop the tower was previously surmounted by a golden weathervane in the form of a sailing longshore fishing vessel, but the pole has since been replaced and the weathervane removed.

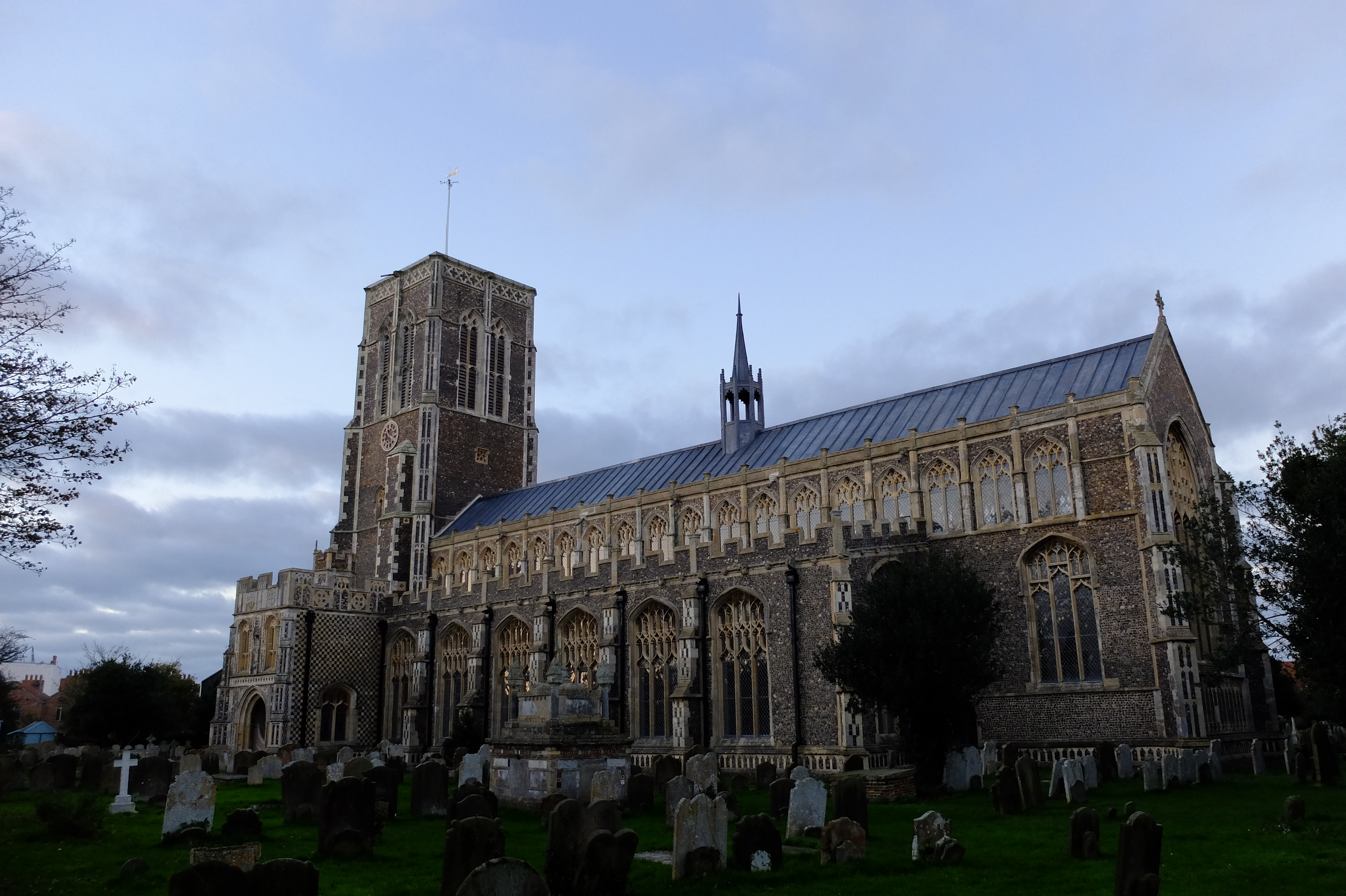
The church following 2015 lead reroofing, with golden weathervane

== Bells ==
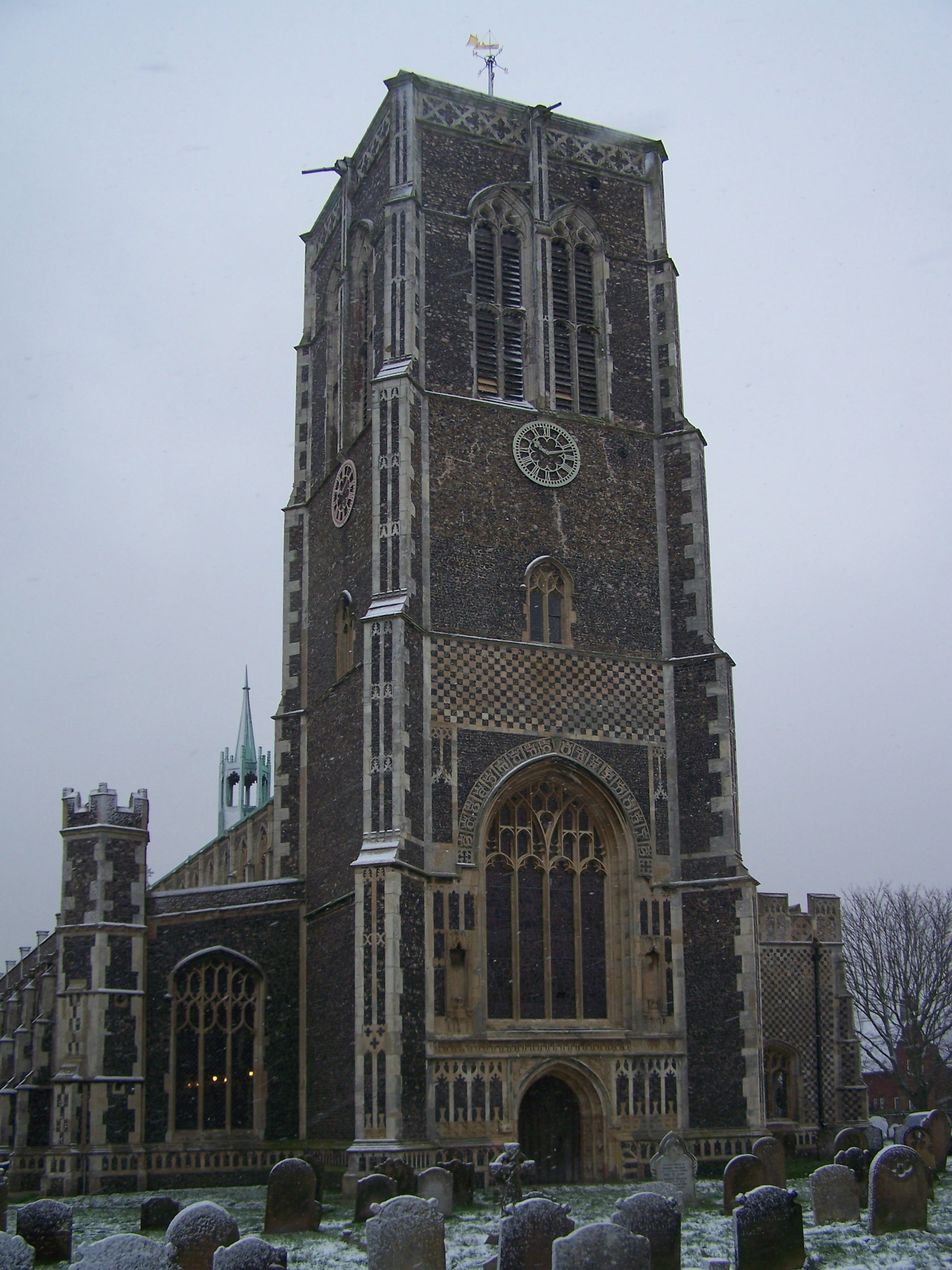
Southwold Church tower in the snow

Southwold tower contains a ring of eight bells hung for change ringing. The tower held five bells in 1553. Over the years these bells have been recast and others added to create the current eight. The current fourth and fifth are probable recasts of the originals, having been cast in 1668 by John Darbie of Ipswich. The third dates from 1820 and is by William Dobson of Downham Market. In 1828 one bell was recast and a further two added. The bell that was recast is the present tenor, also by William Dobson. The sixth and seventh were added and are likely to originate from All Saints, South Elmham. Both are medieval bells, the sixth being cast around 1538 by William Barker and the seventh by Brasyers of Norwich around 1513. The two trebles date from 1881 and are by Moore, Holmes & Mackenzie of Redenhall, Norfolk. However, a peal of Oxford Treble Bob Major was rung on 26 July 1858, indicating that the tower possessed a ring of eight prior to 1881. The tenor (the largest) weighs 10¾ cwt or about 546 kg, and the treble (the lightest) about half of that. The bells hang in a timber frame installed in 1897 by George Day & Son of Eye, Suffolk. In 1990 the bells were rehung on new fittings and the frame strengthened by the Whitechapel Bell Foundry. There is a large amount of space surrounding the frame, allowing ease of access and maintenance. The clock uses the seventh bell to strike the hours. There are no bells in the tower other than the ringing peal. The bells are rung from a ringing chamber some 52 steps up the tower. The chamber has many mementos of past campanological achievements. The tower is affiliated to the Suffolk Guild of Ringers. The bells are rung regularly for Sunday services, weddings and other special occasions.

== Organ ==
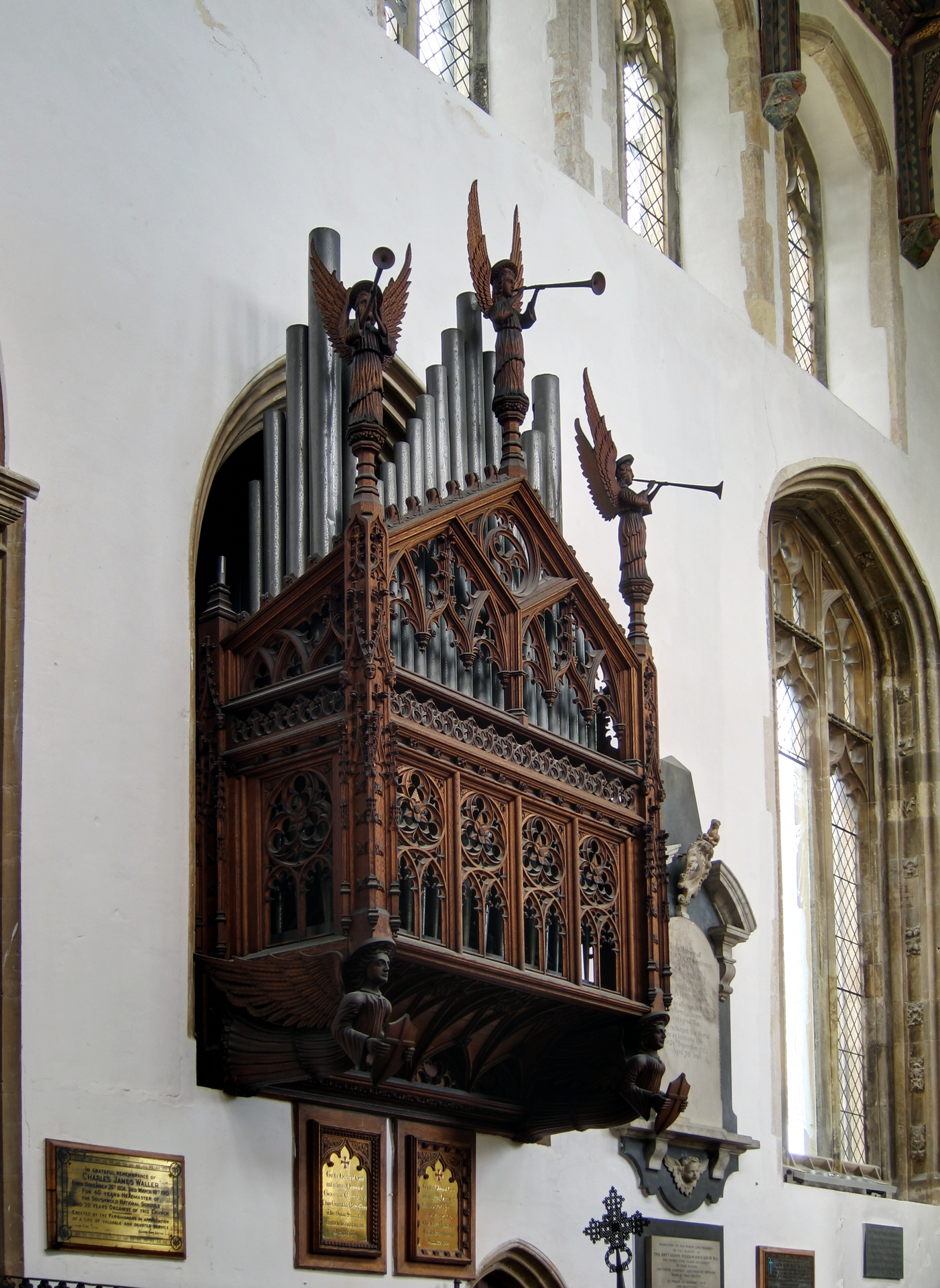
The organ in Southwold

The church has a three manual pipe organ, originally built by J. W. Walker & Sons Ltd in 1887 and later rebuilt by the Thaxted firm Cedric Arnold, Williamson & Hyatt in 1966. The specification, drawn up by Sir Frederick Ouseley, a Professor of Music at Oxford University, may be found on the National Pipe Organ Register.

== Parish status ==
The church is within the Sole Bay Team of Churches with the following churches:

- Holy Trinity Church, Blythburgh
- St Margaret of Antioch's Church, Reydon
- St Andrew's Church, Sotherton
- St Lawrence's Church, South Cove
- St Mary's Church, Uggeshall
- St Andrew's Church, Walberswick
- St Peter & St Paul's Church, Wangford
