= After Culloden, Rebel Hunting =

Painting by John Seymour Lucas

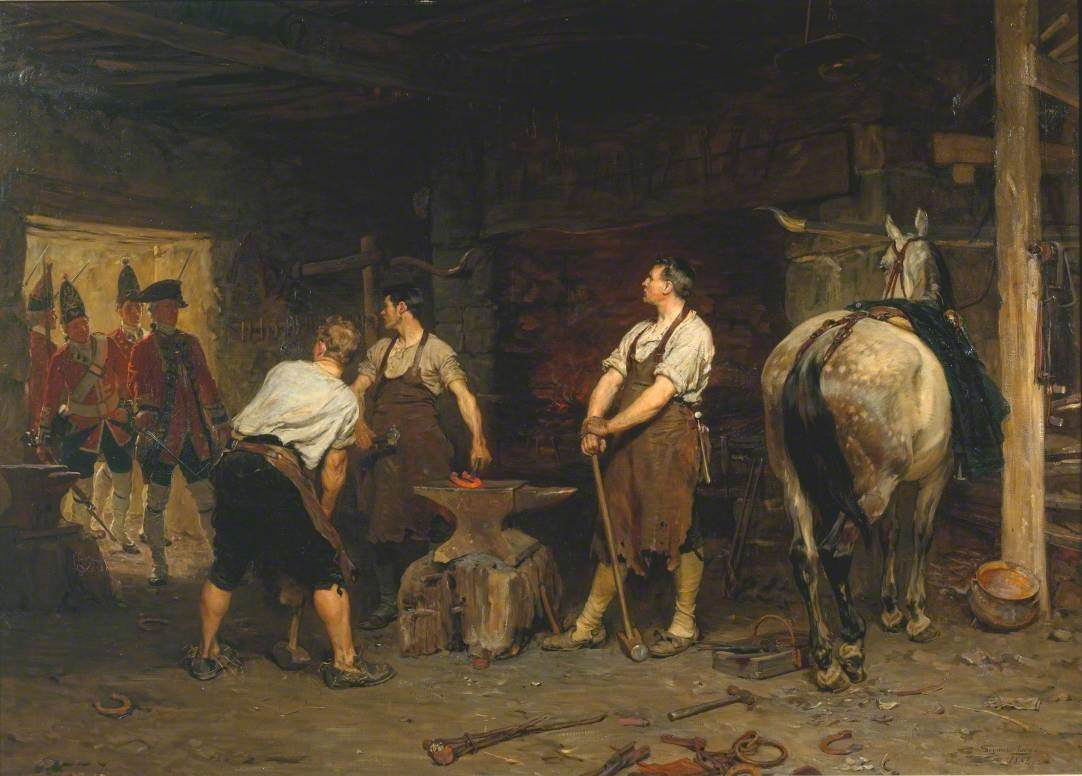
- Artist: John Seymour Lucas
- Year: 1884
- Type: Oil on canvas, history painting
- Dimensions: 196.2 cm × 142.6 cm (77.2 in × 56.1 in)
- Location: Tate Britain; London

After Culloden, Rebel Hunting is an 1884 history painting by the British artist John Seymour Lucas depicting a scene from the Jacobite Rising of 1745. In the wake of the Jacobite defeat the Battle of Culloden in the Scottish Highlands on 16 April 1746, the rebels were pursued. In the painting, British Army soldiers loyal to the Hanoverian dynasty enter a blacksmith where a farrier is at work in search for fugitive Jacobite fighters. The painting was described in the Edwardian era as one the artist's most popular works.

Lucas was a Victorian era painter known for his works depicting scenes from British history. The painting was displayed at the Royal Academy's Summer Exhibition of 1884. It was acquired for the National Gallery through the Chantrey Bequest the same year. Today it is in the collection of the Tate Britain.

== Bibliography ==
- Fea, Allan. J. Seymour Lucas, Royal Academician. Virtue & Company, 1908.
- Roe, Frederic Gordon. Victorian Corners: The Style and Taste of Era. Allen & Unwin, 1968.
