= Corneliszoon =

Corneliszoon or Cornelisz is a Dutch patronym, meaning son of Cornelis, the Dutch form of Cornelius.

People with this patronym include:

- Claes Corneliszoon Moeyaert (1592–1655), authoritative Catholic Dutch painter
- Cornelis Corneliszoon van Uitgeest (1550–1600), inventor of the wind-powered sawmill
- Hendrick Cornelisz. van Vliet (1611–1675), Dutch painter
- Hendrick Cornelisz Vroom (1566–1640), Dutch Golden Age painter and founder of Dutch marine art or seascape painting
- Jacob Cornelisz. van Neck (1564–1638), Dutch naval officer and explorer, led the second Dutch expedition to Indonesia 1598–1599
- Jacob Cornelisz van Oostsanen (1470–1533), Northern Netherlandish designer of woodcuts, and painter
- Jan Cornelisz Vermeyen (1500–1559), Dutch Northern Renaissance painter
- Jeronimus Cornelisz (1598–1629), Frisian apothecary and Dutch East India Company (VOC) merchant
- Johannes Cornelisz Verspronck (1600–1662), Dutch Golden Age portraitist
- Pieter Cornelisz van Slingelandt (1640–1691), Dutch Golden Age painter
- Pieter Cornelisz van Soest (1600–1620), Dutch marine artist, especially prolific in battle-pieces
- Pieter Corneliszoon Hooft (1581–1647), Dutch historian, poet and playwright from the period known as the Dutch Golden Age
- Pieter Corneliszoon Plockhoy (1625–1670), Dutch Mennonite and Collegiant utopist who founded a settlement near Horekill
- Willem Cornelisz van Muyden (1573–1634), Dutch mariner
- Willem Cornelisz Duyster (1599–1635), Dutch Golden Age painter from Amsterdam
- Witte Corneliszoon de With (1599–1658), Dutch naval officer
