= The Gordon Riots =

Painting by John Seymour Lucas

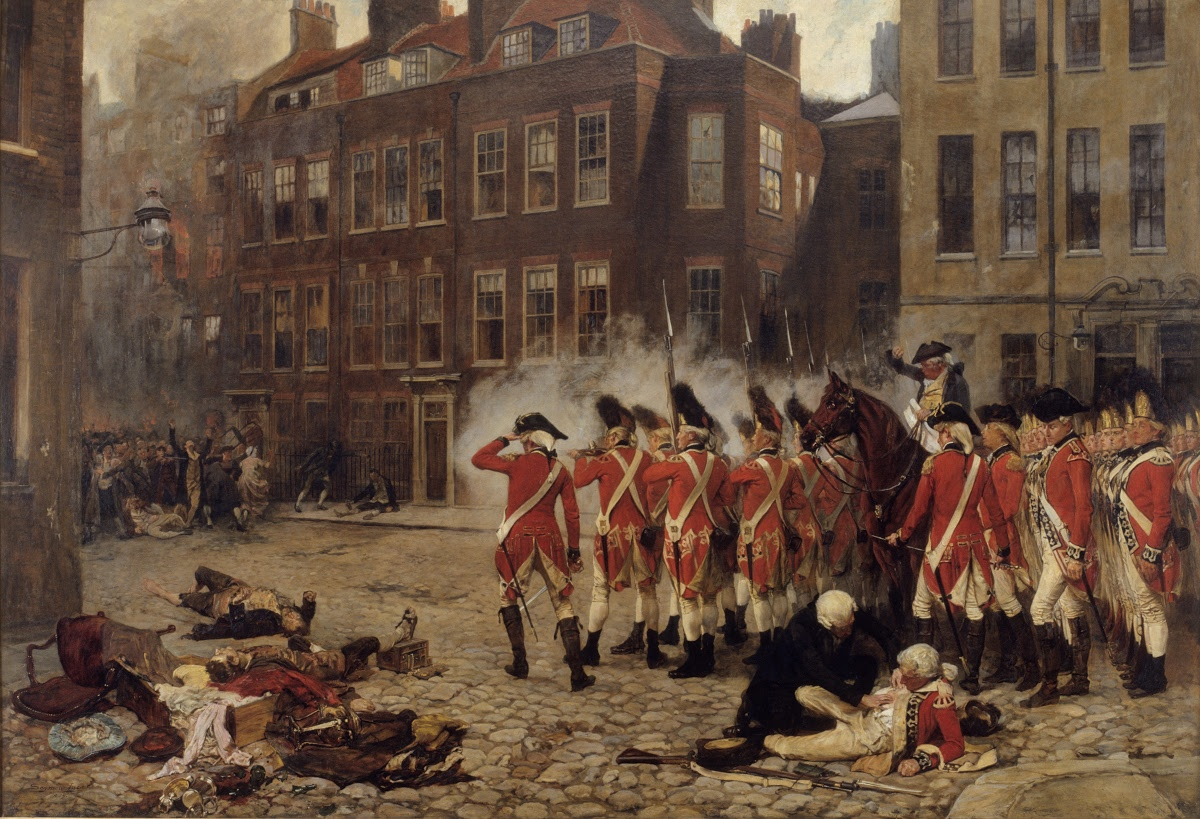
- Artist: John Seymour Lucas
- Year: 1879
- Type: Oil on canvas, history painting
- Dimensions: 126.8 cm × 184.0 cm (49.9 in × 72.4 in)
- Location: Art Gallery of New South Wales, Sydney

The Gordon Riots is an 1879 history painting by the British artist John Seymour Lucas. It depicts the Gordon Riots that took place in London in June 1780. Inflamed by Lord George Gordon, crowds protests against the government of Lord North's measures reducing discrimination against Catholics rapidly descended into a week of rioting. Eventually units of the British Army were deployed in the capital to restore order.

The painting was exhibited at the Royal Academy's Summer Exhibition of 1879. Today it is in the collection of the Art Gallery of New South Wales in Sydney, having been purchased in 1881.

== Bibliography ==
- Fea, Allan. J. Seymour Lucas, Royal Academician. Virtue & Company, 1908.
- Potter, Matthew C. British Art for Australia, 1860–1953: The Acquisition of Artworks from the United Kingdom by Australian National Galleries. Routledge, 2018.
- Tyson, John R. Born in Crisis and Shaped by Controversy: The Relevant History of Methodism, Volume 1. Wipf and Stock Publishers, 2022.
