= St Andrew's Church, Walberswick =

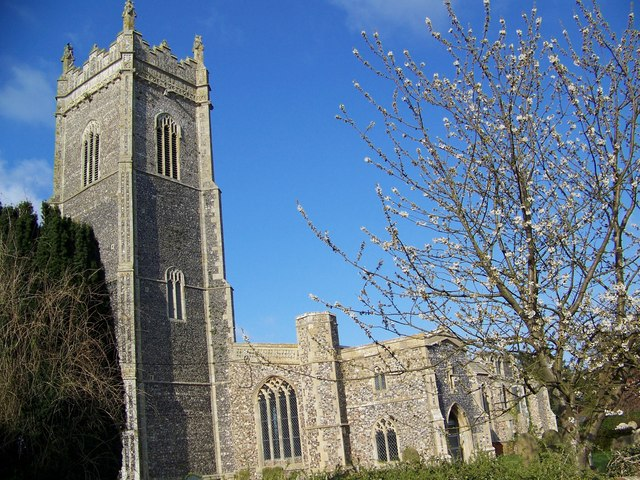
- St Andrew's Church
- St Andrew's Church, Walberswick
- 52°18′50.83″N 1°39′5.51″E
- Location: Walberswick
- Country: England
- Denomination: Church of England

History
- Dedication: St Andrew

Architecture
- Heritage designation: Grade I listed

Administration
- Diocese: Diocese of St Edmundsbury and Ipswich
- Archdeaconry: Suffolk
- Deanery: Halesworth
- Parish: Walberswick

St Andrew's Church is a Grade I listed building in Walberswick, Suffolk. It is an active parish church in the Church of England.

== History ==
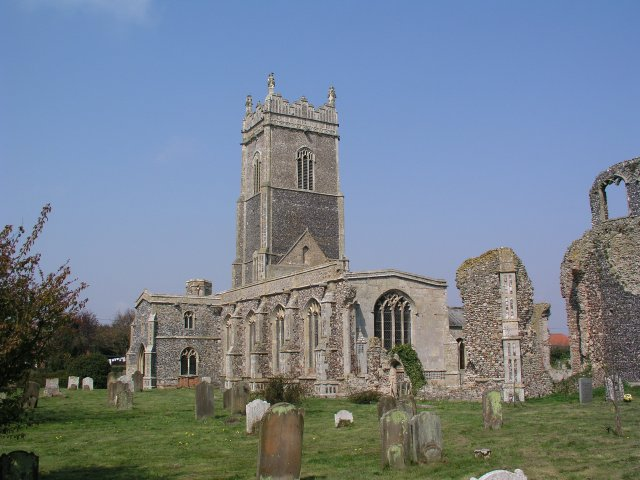
The newer church within the ruins of the old

The church has a fine 15th-century tower. The building originally comprised a nave and chancel, with an eighteen-bay clerestory and six-bay north and south aisles. When the prosperity of the village suffered, there were insufficient funds to maintain the church, and in the 1690s, the parish obtained permission to demolish the old church and build a much smaller one. This was funded by the sale of lead from the roofs and the bells from the tower.

The newer church now sits within the ruins of the old.

== Parish status ==
The Parish of Walberswick is part of the Sole Bay Team Ministry, along with seven other parishes:

- Holy Trinity Church, Blythburgh
- St Margaret of Antioch's Church, Reydon
- St Andrew's Church, Sotherton
- St Lawrence Church, South Cove
- St Edmund's Church, Southwold
- St Mary's Church, Uggeshall
- St Peter and St Paul's Church, Wangford

== Organ ==
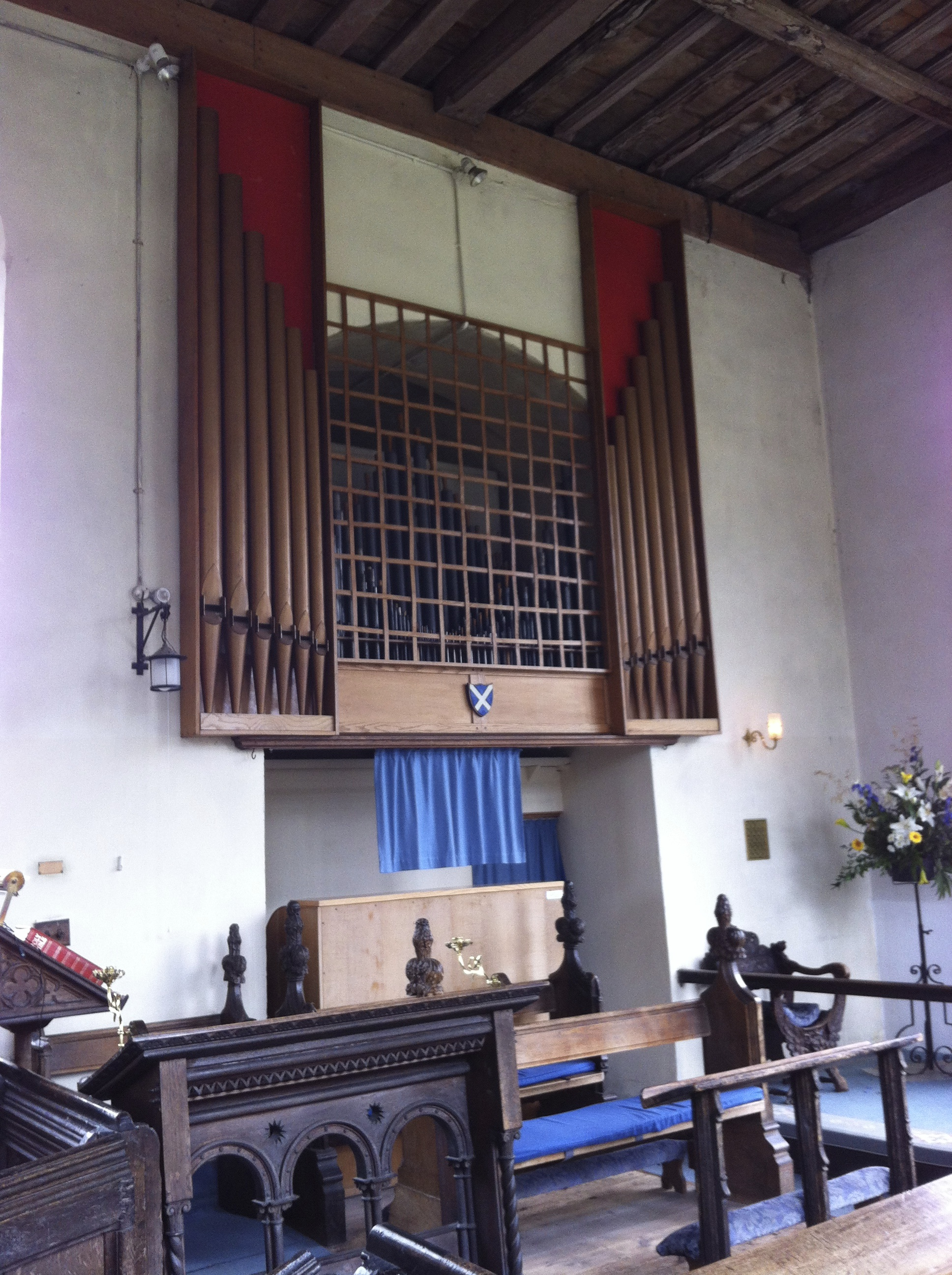
Organ, St Andrew's Church, Walberswick

The former organ was transferred to St. Mary the Virgin, Great Bradley, around 1959 when the present instrument was installed. The organ, which has two manuals, is located in the chancel. Further details are available on the National Pipe Organ Register.
