= John Seymour Lucas =

English painter (1849–1923)

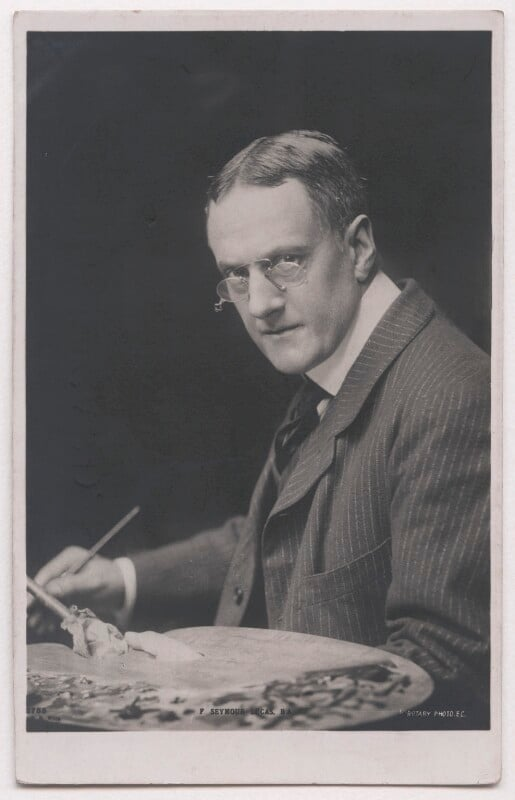
- Lucas, c. 1904
- Born: 21 December 1849; London, England
- Died: 8 May 1923 (aged 73); Blythburgh, Suffolk, England
- Resting place: Holy Trinity church, Blythburgh
- Education: St. Martin's Lane Art School; Royal Academy.
- Known for: historical painting, portraiture, costume design.
- Notable work: Rebel Hunting after Culloden
- Spouse: Marie Cornelissen (m. 1877; died 1921)
- Family: John Lucas (uncle); Louis Cornelissen (father-in-law)

John Seymour Lucas RA (21 December 1849 – 8 May 1923) was a Victorian English historical and portrait painter, as well as an accomplished theatrical costume designer. He was born into an artistic London family (he was the nephew of the painter John Lucas), and originally trained as a woodcarver, but turned his attention to portrait painting and entered first the St. Martin's Lane Art School and later the Royal Academy Schools. Here he met fellow artist Marie Cornelissen from France, whom he married in 1877. Lucas' artistic education included extensive travels around Europe, particularly Holland and Spain, where he studied the Flemish and Spanish masters. He first started exhibiting in 1872, was elected an associate member of the Royal Academy in 1886, and a full Royal Academician in 1899.

== Biography and work ==
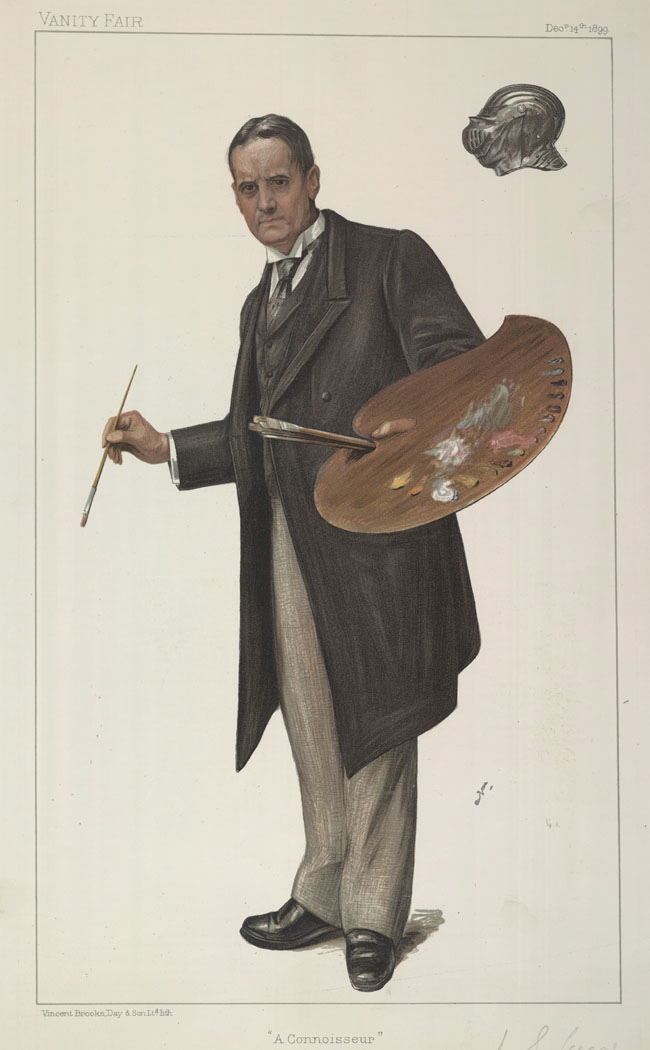
Lucas caricatured by "N" for Vanity Fair, 1899

John Seymour Lucas was first and foremost a historical genre painter with a particular talent for realism in the depiction of costumes and interiors. Inspired by van Dyck and particularly Diego Velázquez, he excelled in depicting scenes from the British 16th- to 18th-century Tudor and Stuart periods, including in particular the Spanish Armada, the English Civil War, and the Jacobite rebellions.

He exhibited The Gordon Riots at the Royal Academy's Summer Exhibition of 1879. His first major work to achieve widespread public acclaim was After Culloden, Rebel Hunting, executed in 1884. It was praised not only for the obvious tension between the muscular blacksmiths and the red-coated forces of law and order (or repression), but for the extraordinary realism in the depiction of the rough smithy and glowing horseshoe on the anvil.

One of his students was the painter Ethel Wright before she trained further in Paris. She would become known for her work with the suffragettes.

As his reputation grew, Lucas increasingly mixed in society circles. He became firm friends with the famous society portrait painter John Singer Sargent who was his almost exact contemporary. A portrait of Lucas executed by John Singer Sargent is displayed in Tate Britain. Towards the 1890s John Seymour Lucas executed a number of major works for prestigious public buildings or royal clients. These include: The Flight of the Five Members (Houses of Parliament), The Granting of the Charter of the City of London (Royal Exchange), Reception by HM King Edward VII of the Moorish Ambassador (Royal Collection), HRH the Prince of Wales in German Uniform (Royal Collection).

In addition to executing more than 100 major oil paintings and a host of drawings, Lucas was renowned as a set and costume designer for the historical dramas popular on the late Victorian and early Edwardian stages. One of his more unusual commissions was the "Duke of Normandy" costume for the ill-fated prince Alfred of Saxe Coburg-Gotha for the Devonshire House Ball in 1897. Lucas was also a prolific watercolour painter; he was elected as a member of the Institute of Painters in Water Colours in 1877.

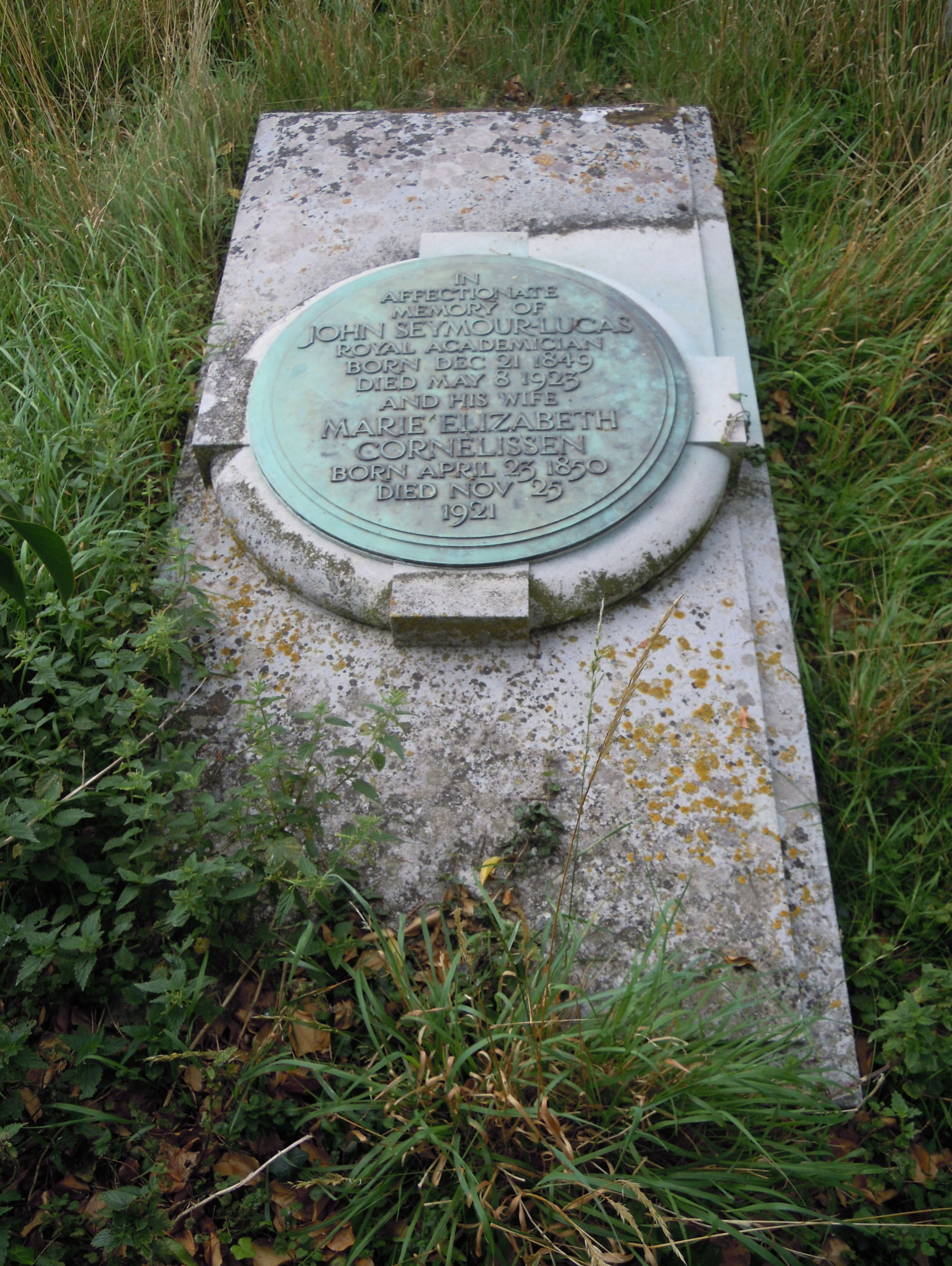
John Seymour Lucas's grave in the churchyard of Holy Trinity church

During most of his artistic career, Lucas lived in a purpose-built studio in South Hampstead, London, designed for him by his friend and fellow artist, architect Sydney Williams-Lee.

Lucas joined the Sylvan Debating Club in 1872, and painted a portrait of the society's founder Alfred Harmsworth.

He retired from painting towards the end of World War I and moved to Blythburgh, Suffolk, where he re-designed a house next to the church known as "The Priory". Lucas died in 1923 and is interred in the churchyard of Holy Trinity church in Blythburgh. His son, Sydney Seymour Lucas, also became an artist and illustrator.

== Legacy ==
John Seymour Lucas was a prominent artist during the late Victorian period, whose paintings often focused on British history and reflected themes associated with Imperial Great Britain. His works were characterized by detailed, colorful compositions and theatrical presentation, which aligned with the tastes of his contemporary audience. Following the end of the Pax Britannica and the rise of Modernism, Lucas’s style became less prominent, and he is not widely known today. He is recognized for his contributions as a chronicler of British history and as a costume painter.

== Gallery ==
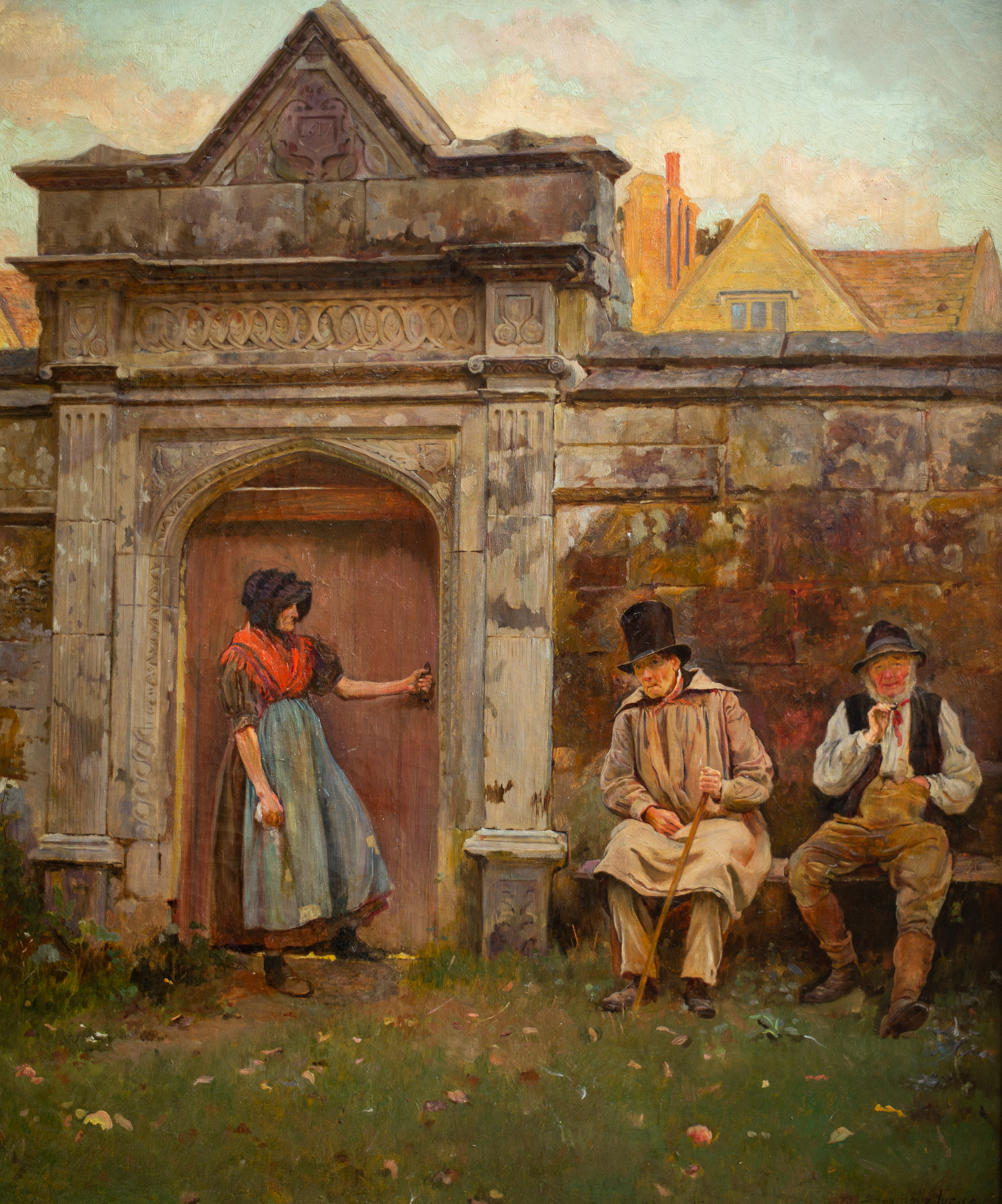
The Old Gateway, 1876

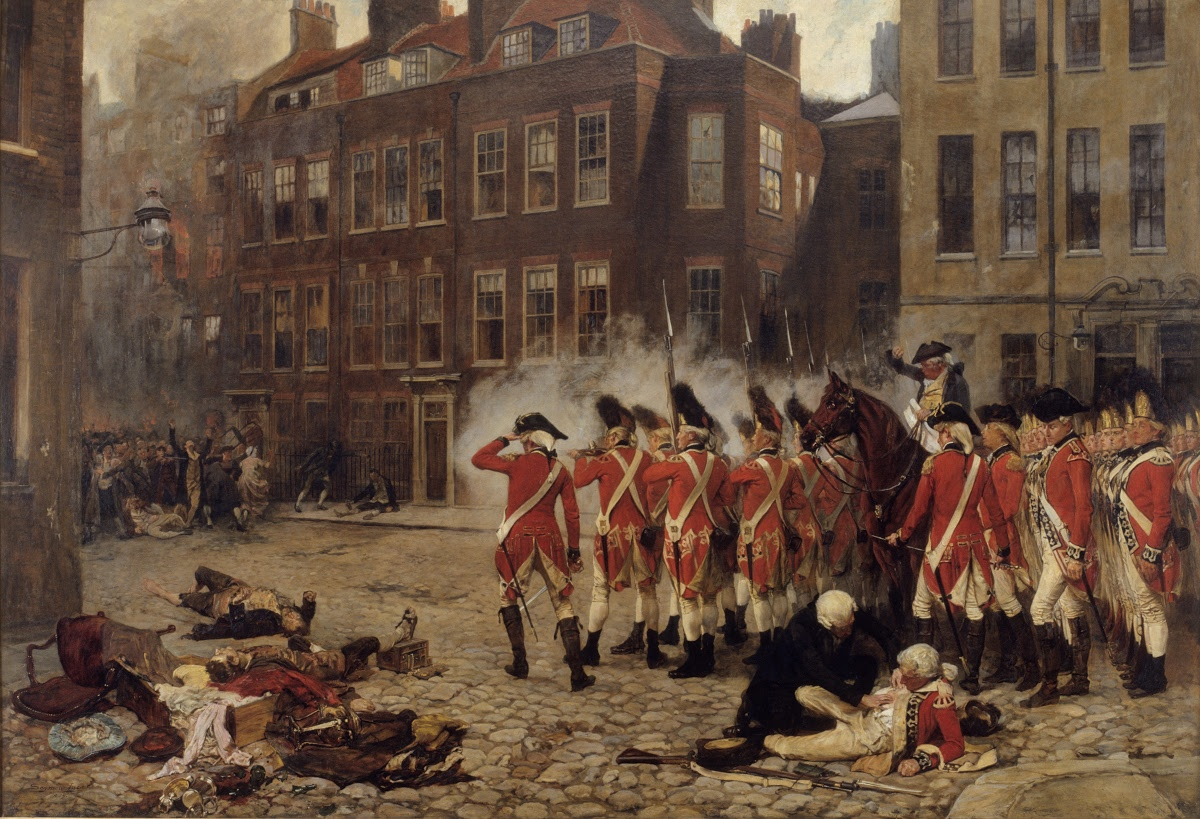
The Gordon Riots, 1879

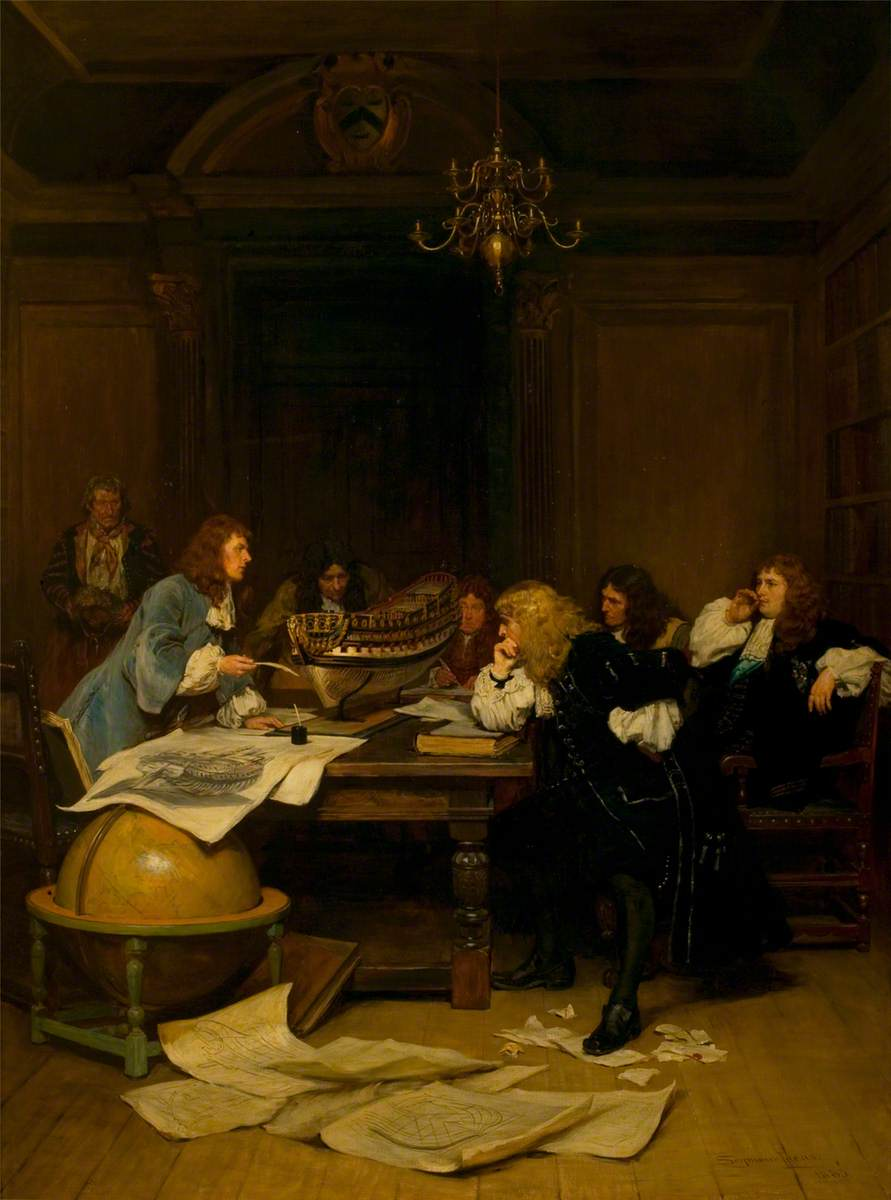
A Whip for Van Tromp, 1883

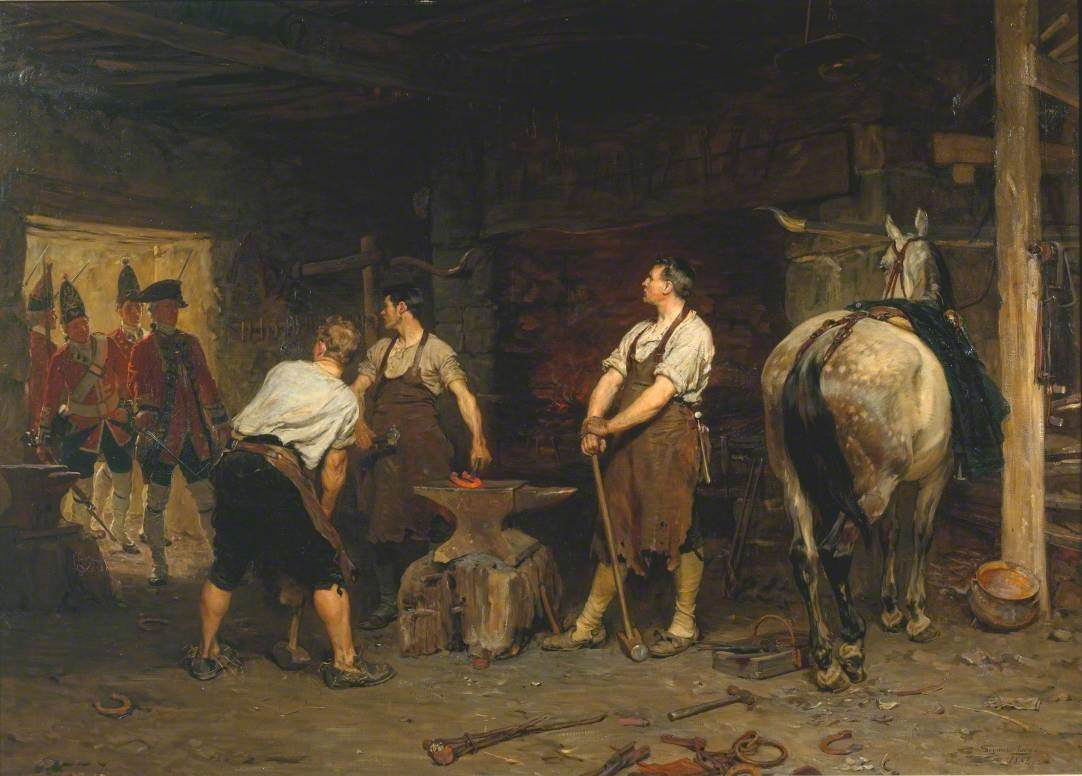
After Culloden, Rebel Hunting, 1884

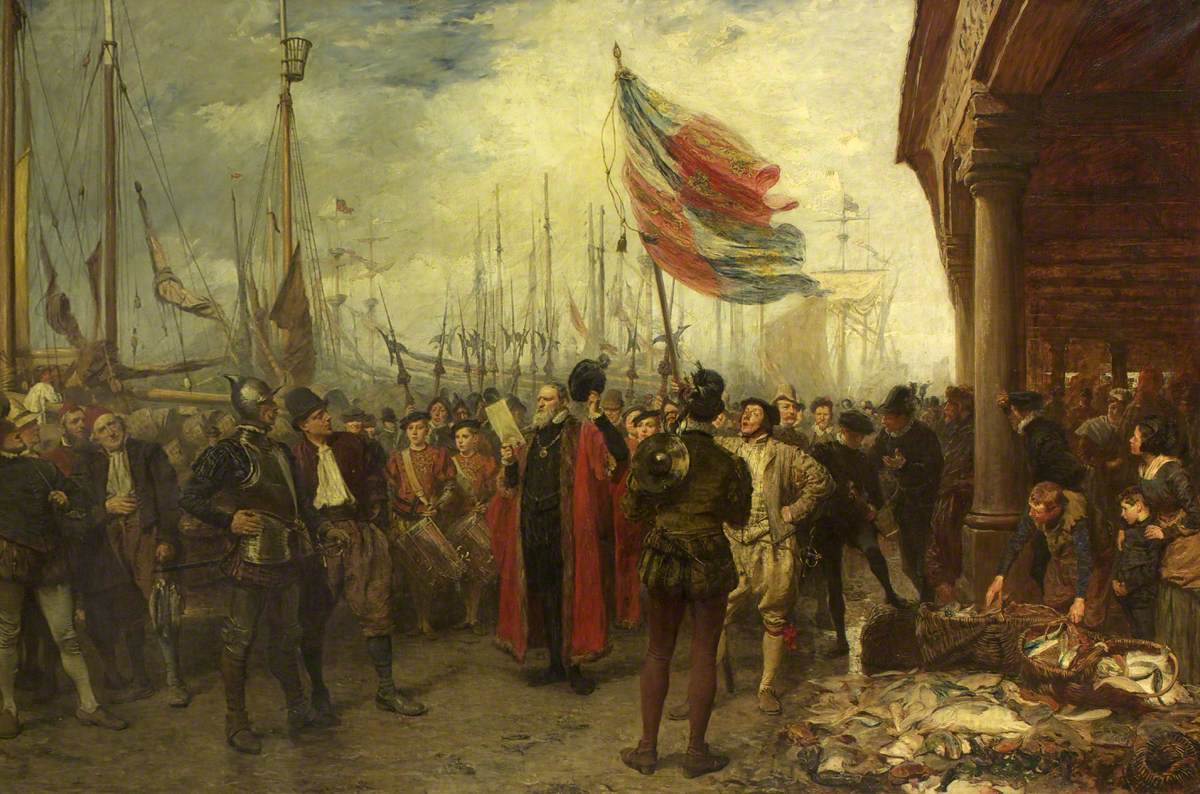
The Call to Arms, Plymouth Quay, 1588, 1894

The King's Rival, 1901
