= Marie Seymour Lucas =

English painter

- Born: Marie Elizabeth Cornelissen; 23 April 1850; Paris, France
- Died: 25 November 1921 (aged 71); Hendon, Middlesex, England
- Education: The Royal Academy
- Known for: Painting
- Spouse: John Seymour Lucas (m. 1877)

Marie Seymour Lucas (born Marie Elizabeth Cornelissen; 23 April 1850 – 25 November 1921) was a French-born English painter. She studied in London, where she married painter John Seymour Lucas. She lived in England for the rest of her life.

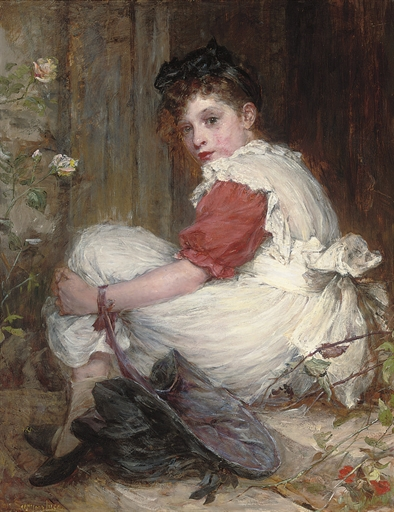
On the Threshold

Daughter of Louis Dieudonné Cornelissen and Marianne, née Bath, she was born in France. Her parents sent her to England for some of her education, and she attended St. Martin's Lane Academy and later the Royal Academy. There she began showing her work in 1877. As she married the painter John Seymour Lucas the same year, Marie Cornelissen became known professionally only by her married name. She is known for historical works and genre scenes, but she later concentrated on domestic scenes with children.

Lucas exhibited her work at the Palace of Fine Arts at the 1893 World's Columbian Exposition in Chicago, Illinois. Her painting of orphans We are but little children weak, nor born to any high estate was included in the 1905 book Women Painters of the World.

She died in Hendon, Middlesex.

== Gallery ==
Images from 1890 edition of Frances Browne's book for fairytales, Granny's Wonderful Chair, illustrated by Seymour Lucas.

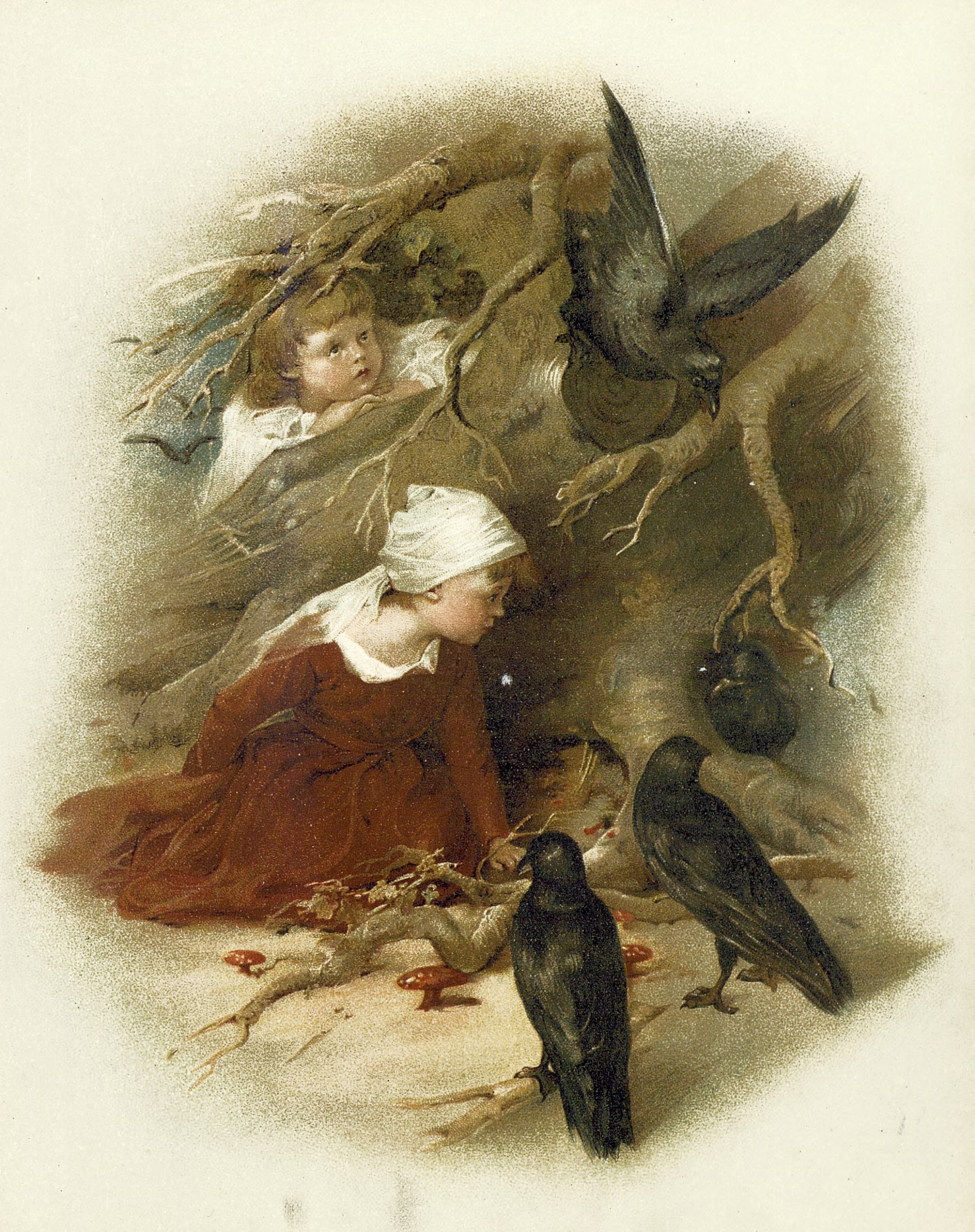
"They came into the ravens' neighbourhood"

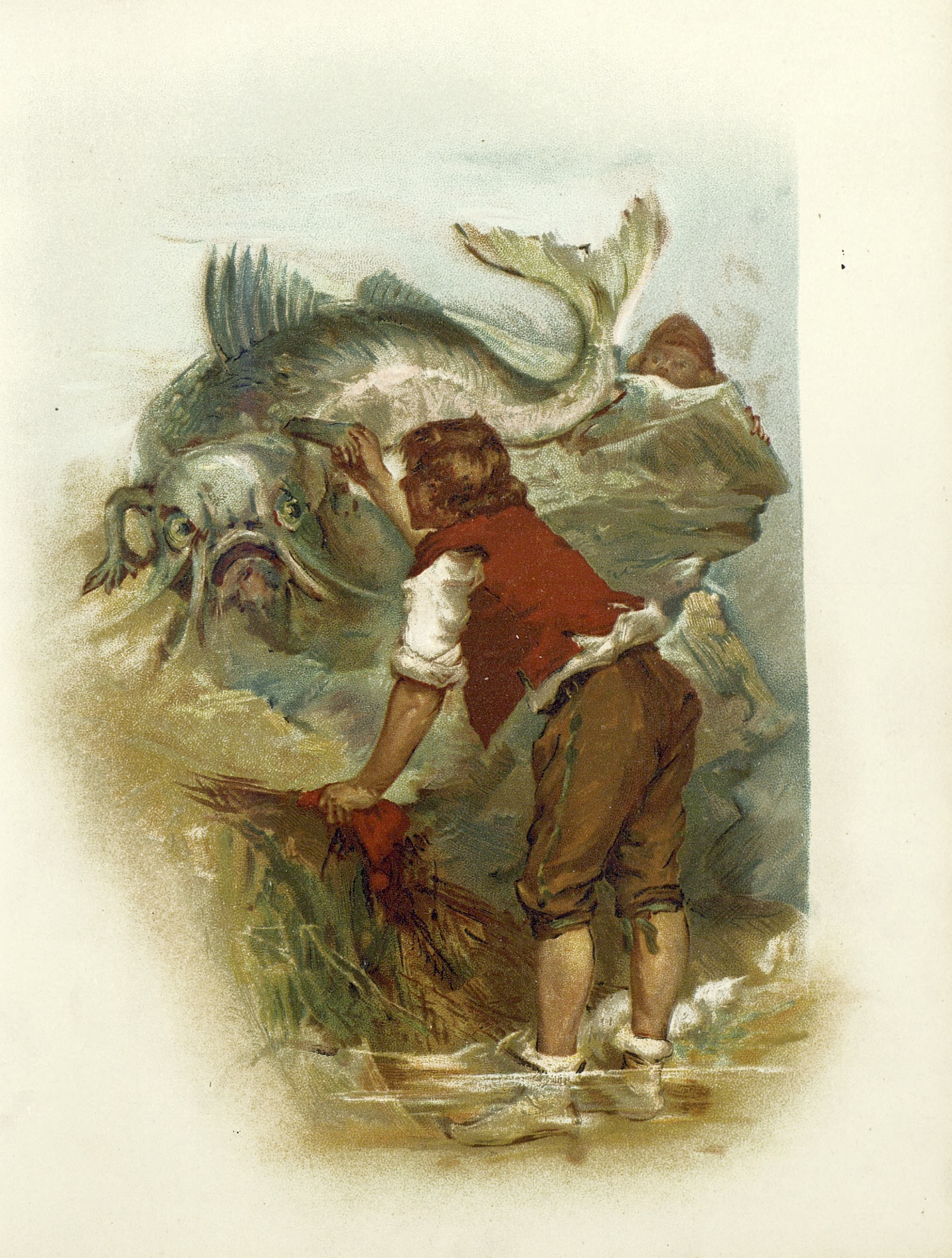
"Civil helped the great fish"

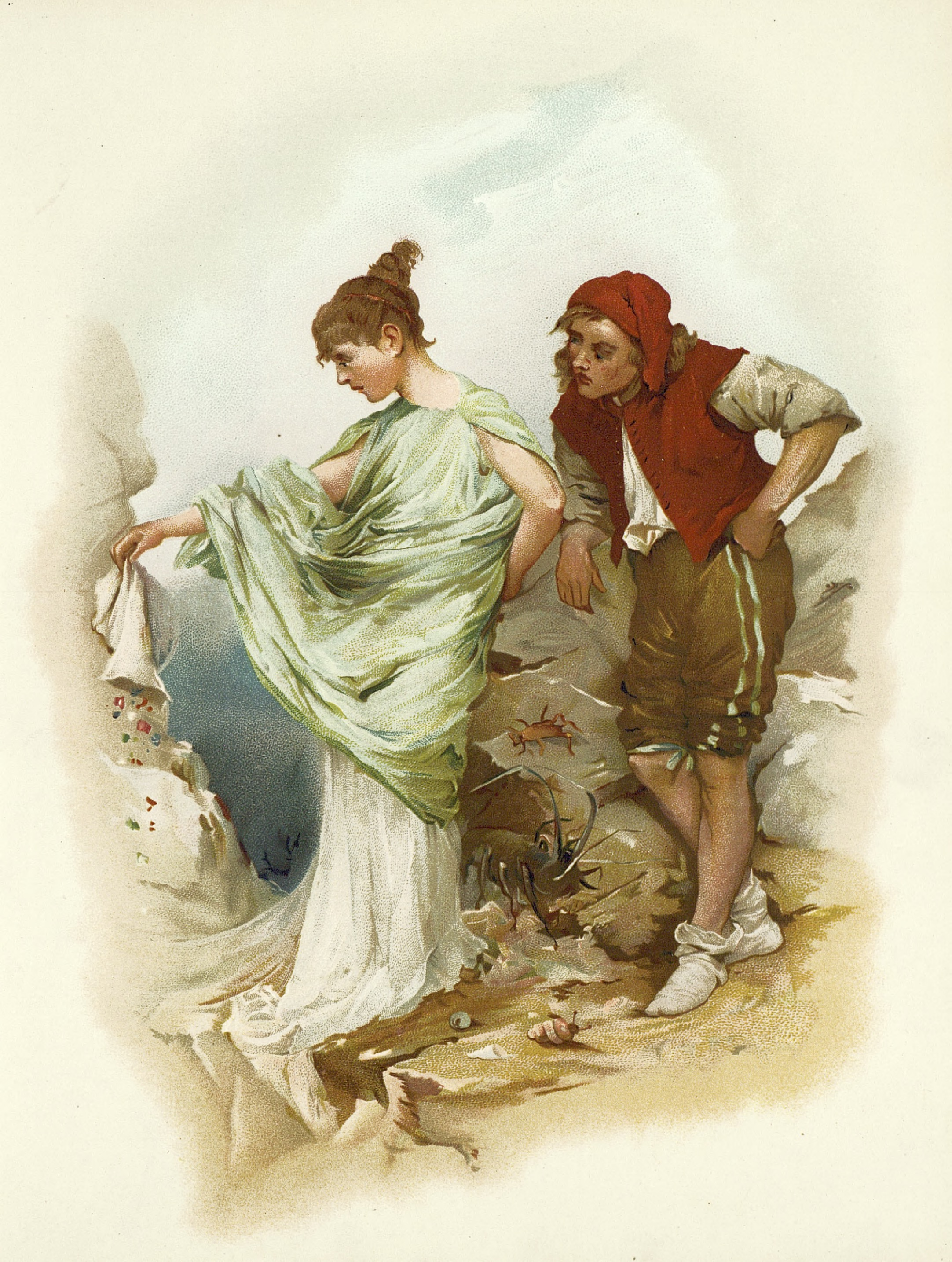
"She flung it into the sea"

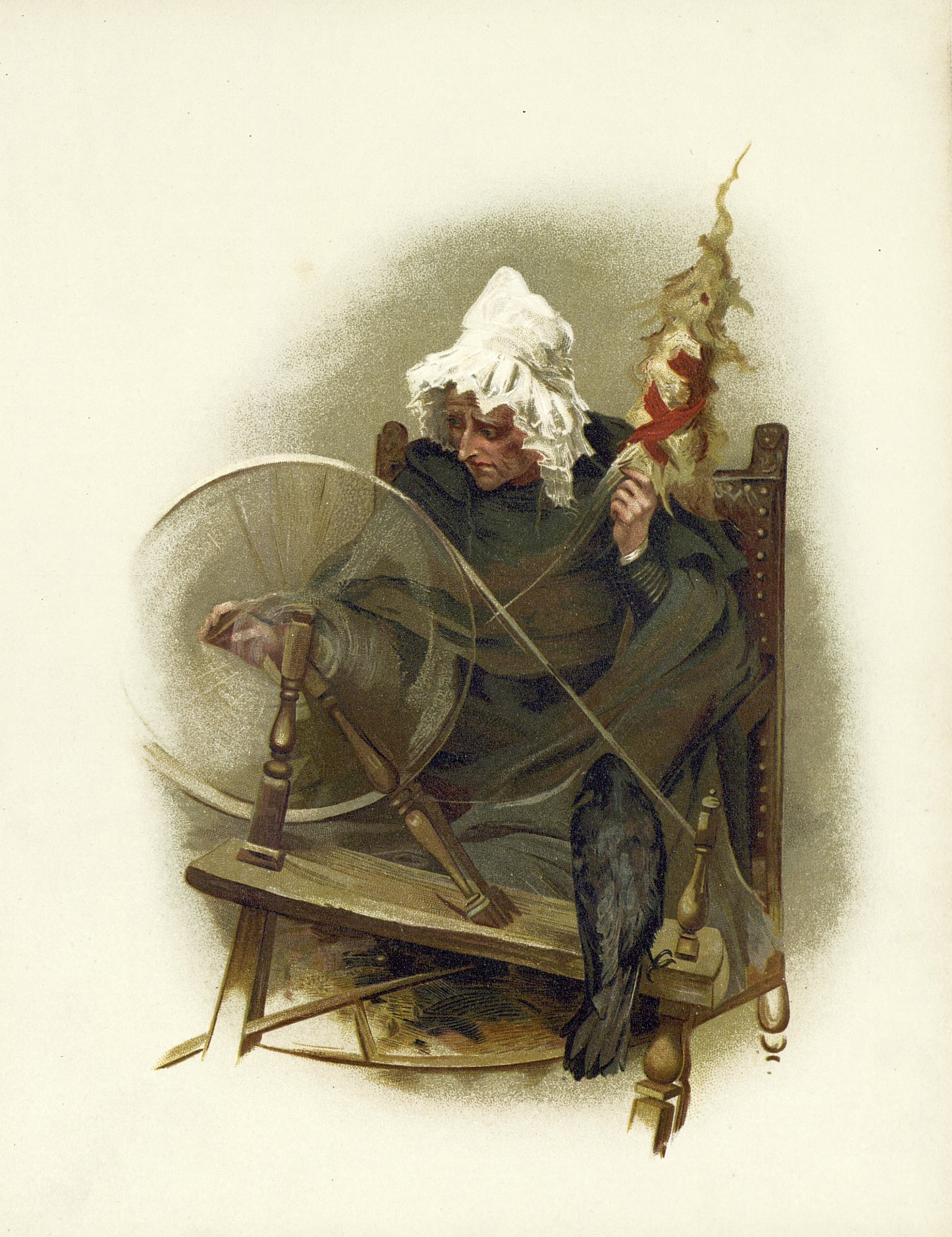
"Dame Frosty face yet spins"
