= Mihalarias Art Center =

The Mihalarias Art Center was established in Kolonaki in the center of Athens, Greece in 1984. It went on to open other branches in the city, at the Kifissia Gallery and at the Art City in Malakassa.

== Overview ==
The gallery Mihalarias Art was officially opened in Kifissia in May 2005. Mihalarias Art was opened by Stavros Mihalarias, an art dealer, restorer and artist.

Built in the beginning of the 20th century, this building is in the center of Kifissia with an outside area designed to host exhibitions of sculpture. Paintings and sculptures by Greek and international artists of the 19th and 20th centuries, antiquities, icons and many other works of art are on permanent exhibition in its rooms. Periodical shows and exhibitions in collaboration with international galleries are also organized.
