= Cornelisse =

Cornelisse is a Dutch patronymic surname meaning "son of Cornelis". It may refer to:

- Henk Cornelisse (born 1940), Dutch track racing cyclist
- Jan Cornelisse, mistaken identification of "Ko Cornelissen" (1904–1992), Dutch boxer
- Michel Cornelisse (born 1965), Dutch road racing cyclist and directeur sportif
- Paulien Cornelisse (born 1976), Dutch author and cabaret performer
- Tim Cornelisse (born 1978), Dutch football player, brother of Yuri
- Tonya Cornelisse (born 1980s), American actress
- Yuri Cornelisse (born 1975), Dutch football player, brother of Tim

== See also ==
- Cornelissen
