= Louis Cornelissen =

British lithographer

- Born: Louis Dieudonné Cornelissen; 1817 or 1818
- Died: 3 December 1889; Chelsea, London, England
- Occupation: Lithographer
- Known for: founding L. Cornelissen & Son
- Family: Marie Seymour Lucas (daughter)

Louis Dieudonné Cornelissen (1817 or 1818 – 3 December 1889) was a Flemish-born British lithographer, and the founder of L. Cornelissen & Son, the London art supplies shop.

Cornelissen was born in 1817 or 1818.

He married Marianne Bath. His daughter Marie Seymour Lucas (1850–1921) was an artist who married fellow artist John Seymour Lucas. His son Louis Dieudonné Jules Cornelissen (1857–1942) joined the business in 1882, and took over after his father's death.

Cornelissen died in Chelsea, London on 3 December 1889.
