= Pieter Cornelisz van Soest =

Dutch marine artist

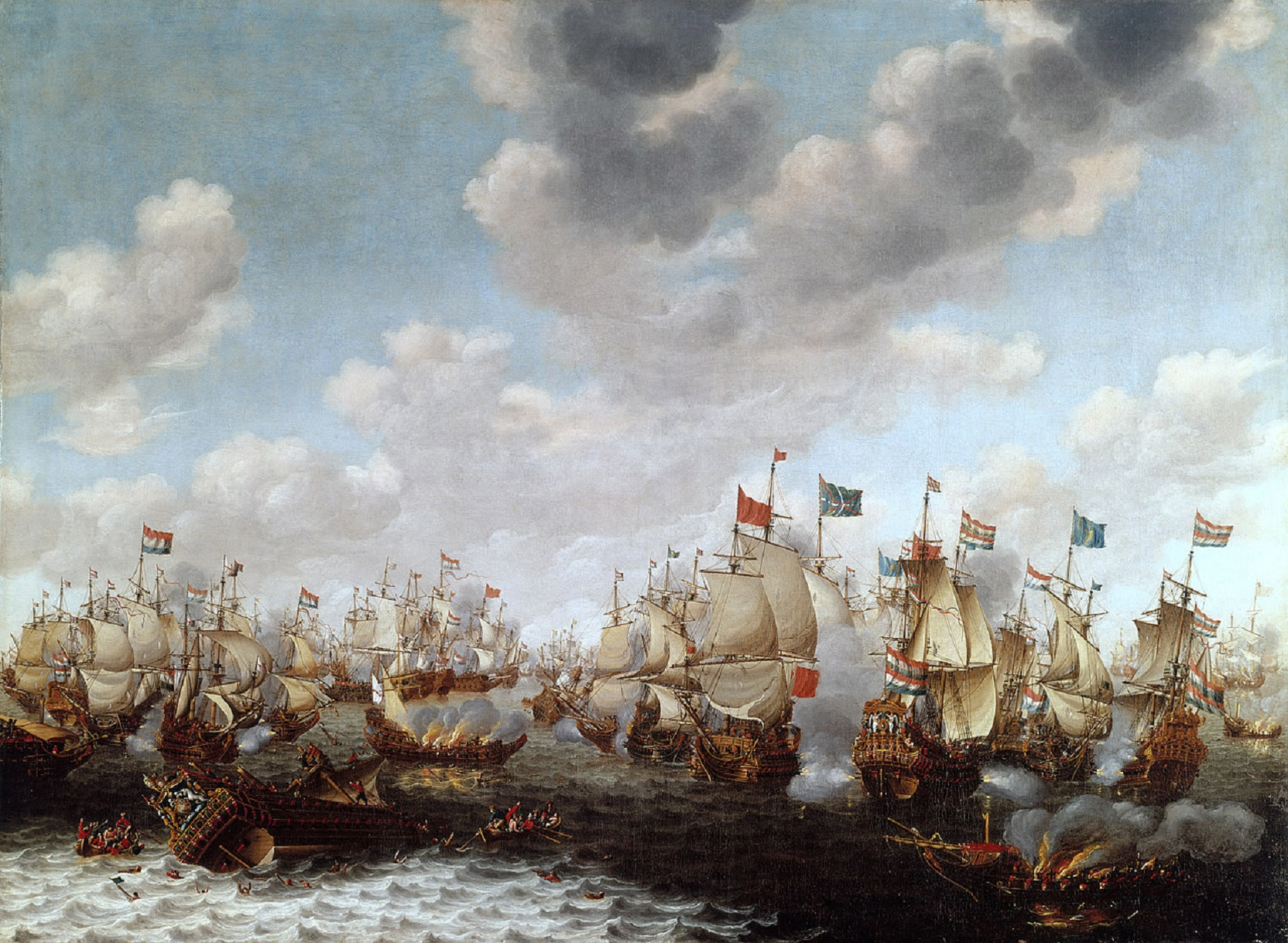
Four Days Battle, 1666.

Pieter Cornelisz van Soest (born c. 1600–1620, flourished c. 1640–67) was a Dutch marine artist, especially prolific in battle-pieces.

== Biography ==
Little is known about him. He was the son of Cornelis Pietersz van Soest, and in 1642 he became Poorter of Amsterdam where he was recorded until 1667. In April 1643, as a painter living on the Nieuwezijds Voorburgwal, he married Marritie Dircx (born ca. 1620 in Goch). Jan Abrahamsz Beerstraaten was one of his pupils.

Among his subjects are the Battle of the Downs and the Second Anglo-Dutch War, particularly the Raid on the Medway. Van Soest also depicted the ships Comet Star and Eendracht. His paintings usually have a panoramic view of the battles. Van Soest rendered ships with delicate brushstrokes, while a light impasto is a feature of his skies.
