= Rich baronets of London (1676) =

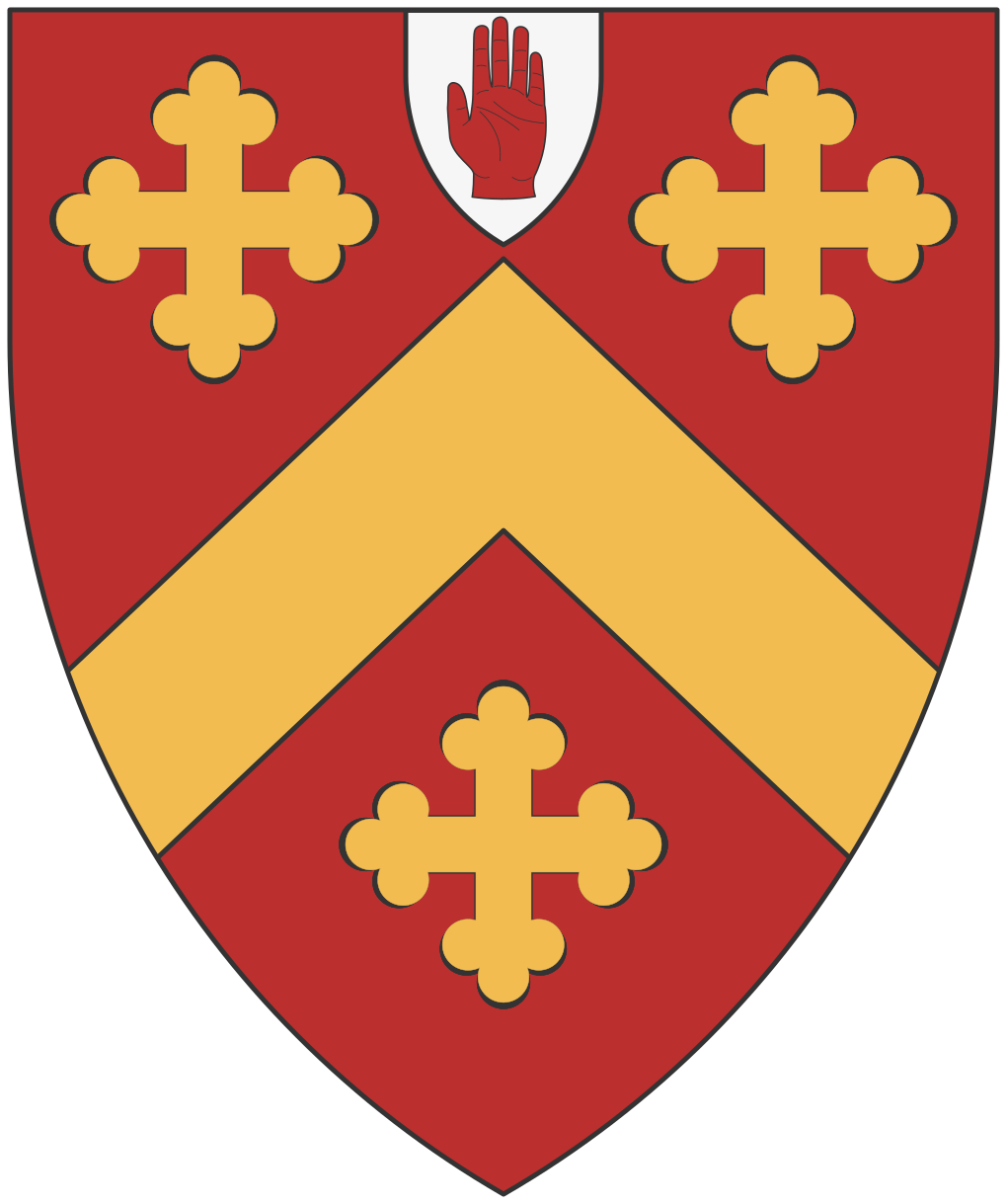
Escutcheon of the Rich baronets of London

The Rich baronetcy, of London, was created in the Baronetage of England on 24 January 1676 for Charles Rich, of Mulbarton, Norfolk, with special remainder to his son-in-law and distant cousin Robert Rich, son of Nathaniel Rich.

The 2nd Baronet, a politician, duly inherited the title the following year. He was Member of Parliament for Dunwich from 1689 to 1699. His younger son, the 4th Baronet, was a cavalry officer wounded at the Battle of Blenheim and Battle of Ramillies. The title became extinct on the death of the 6th Baronet in 1799.

== Rich baronets, of London (1676) ==
- Sir Charles Rich, 1st Baronet (c.1619–1677) was the fourth son of Sir Edwin Rich and grandson of Robert Rich, 2nd Baron Rich. He married Elizabeth Cholmeley, by whom he had two daughters and co-heirs, Elizabeth, who married Peter Civell, and Mary, who married Robert Rich, of Stondon, Essex. Each inherited one of his manors. He was buried in the parish church of Enfield Town.
- Sir Robert Rich, 2nd Baronet (c. 1648–1699)
- Sir Charles Rich, 3rd Baronet (c. 1680–19 October 1706), son of the 2nd Baronet. Appointed Vice-Admiral of Suffolk on 25 September 1699, succeeding his father shortly before the latter's death, he held the office until 8 July 1702, when he was replaced by Lionel Tollemache, 3rd Earl of Dysart. He died without issue.
- Sir Robert Rich, 4th Baronet (1685–1768), son of the 2nd Baronet. He had a political career, Member of Parliament for three constituencies, and commanded a regiment at the Battle of Dettingen.
- Sir Robert Rich, 5th Baronet (1717–1785), son of the 4th Baronet, had only a daughter, Mary Frances. causing the baronetcy to pass to his brother. Mary Frances Rich married the Rev. Charles Bostock, of Shirley House, Hampshire, who assumed the surname of Rich in 1790 and was the 1st Baronet of the 1791 creation.
- Sir George Rich, 6th Baronet (13 June 1728 – 8 January 1799), brother of the 5th Baronet, died unmarried.
