= Edward Echyngham =

English noble and naval commander

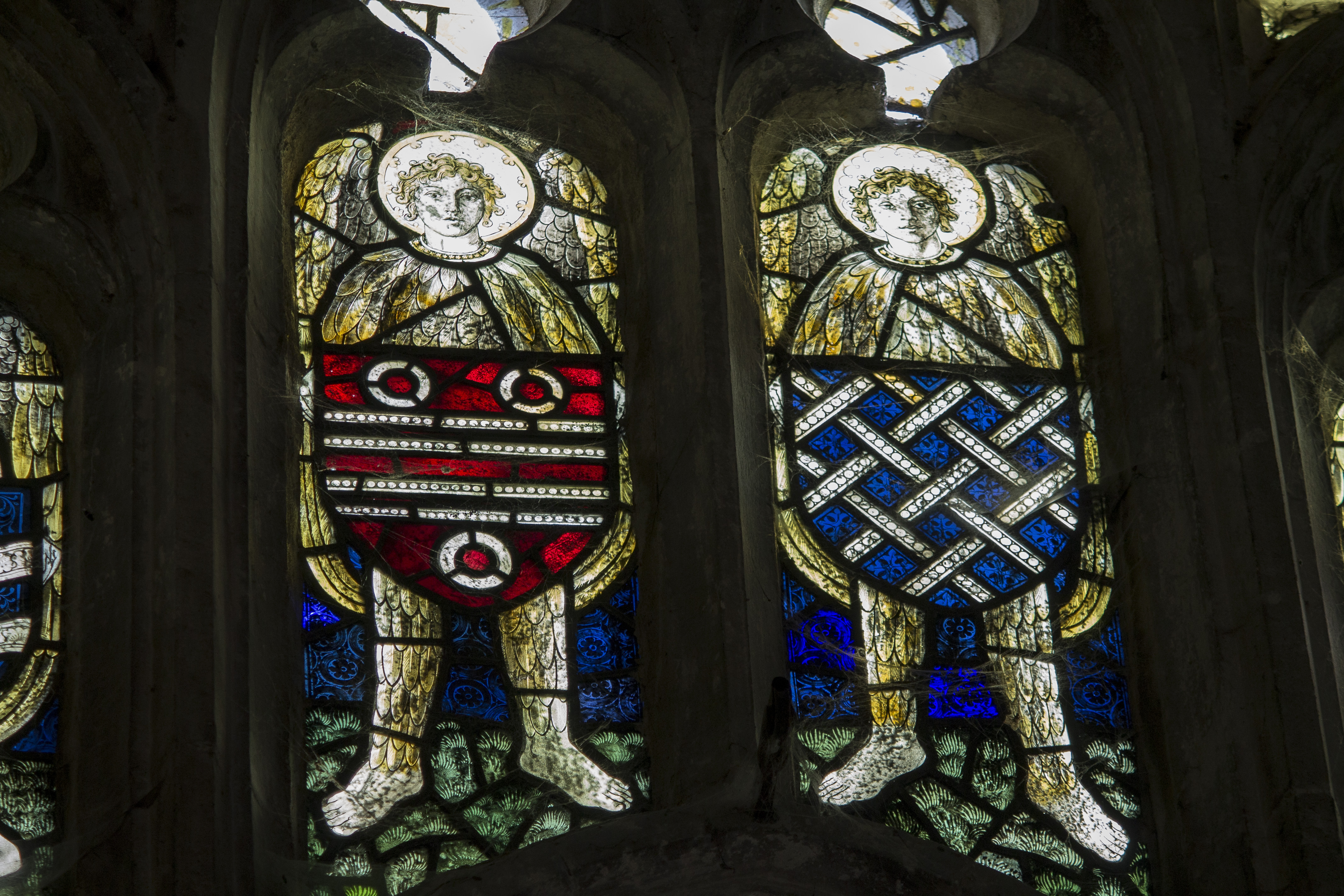
The arms of Echyngham (right), Azure fretty argent, and those of Rykhill (left), Gules, two bars gemelles between three annulets argent, in late medieval glass at Nettlestead, Kent.

Sir Edward Echyngham (ante 1483 – 8 July 1527), (also Etchingham, Itchyngham, etc.), of Barsham and Ipswich in Suffolk, was a commander on land and at sea, briefly Constable of Limerick Castle, and Collector of Customs at Ipswich. He is remembered as the author of a letter to Cardinal Wolsey describing the death of Lord Admiral Howard at Brest in 1513. From 1485 the presence of the Howard Dukes of Norfolk was felt directly along the Barsham reach of the River Waveney from their possession of Bungay Castle.

== Background ==
The Echyngham family, hereditary stewards of the Rape of Hastings during the 12th and 13th centuries, were seated at Etchingham in Sussex. Their lordship descended in direct male line to Sir Thomas Echyngham (died 1444), son of Sir William de Echyngham (died 1412) and his wife, Joan Maltravers (died 1404), daughter of John FitzAlan, 1st Baron Arundel and Eleanor Maltravers. Sir William, Dame Joan and Sir Thomas were commemorated in a tripartite canopied brass with military figures in Etchingham church, which had been rebuilt by Sir William's father, an elder Sir William (died 1388).

Sir Thomas Echyngham had two sisters, Elizabeth (who married first Sir Thomas Hoo of Mulbarton, Norfolk (died 1420), and second Sir Thomas Lewknor of Horsted Keynes (died 1452)), and Joan, who married John Rykhill. The Echyngham family bore the arms azure fretty argent.

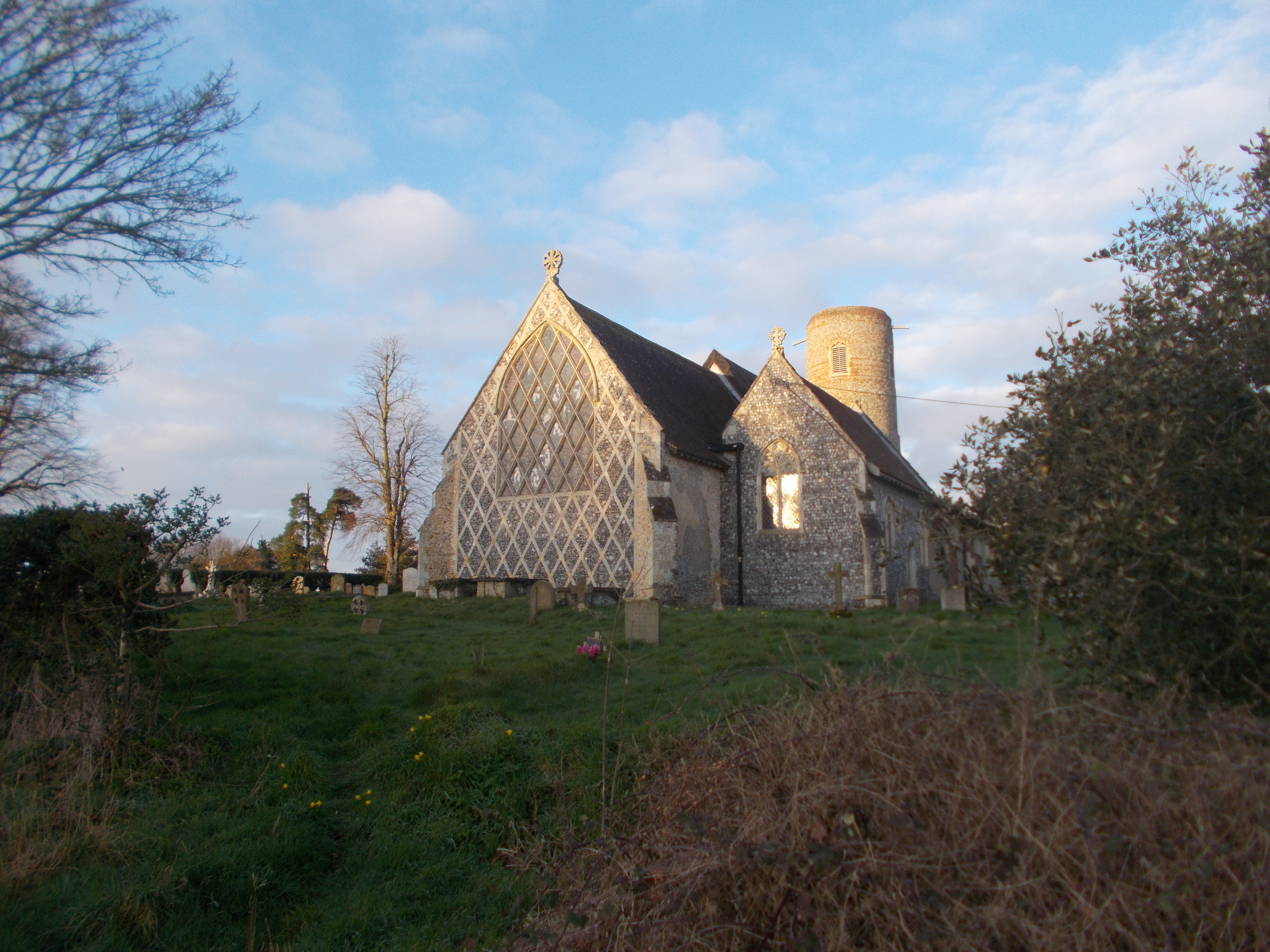
The East wall of Barsham church, with reticulated or "fretty" flushwork and tracery.

=== The Echynghams of Barsham ===
Sir Thomas married Margaret Knyvet by 1424. Margaret was daughter of John Knyvet, M.P. (1359–1418) (whose wife Joan Botetourt had brought Mendlesham to the family in marriage): her grandfather was John Knyvet the Lord Chancellor. Margaret had first married Sir Robert de Tye (died 1415) of Barsham, between Bungay and Beccles in Suffolk, and, secondly, Sir Thomas Marny of Layer Marney in Essex, whose will, made in 1417, was proved in November 1421. So Barsham came to her third husband, Sir Thomas Echyngham, who made his first presentation to the rectory there in 1424 and had two sons and two daughters with her. Their elder son Thomas (born c. 1425) inherited the Sussex estates: the manor of Barsham, with those of Kessingland and Blaunchards (in Heveningham), descended to the younger son, Richard, so establishing the Suffolk line. The sister Anne Echyngham married John Tuchet, 6th Baron Audley (died 1491).

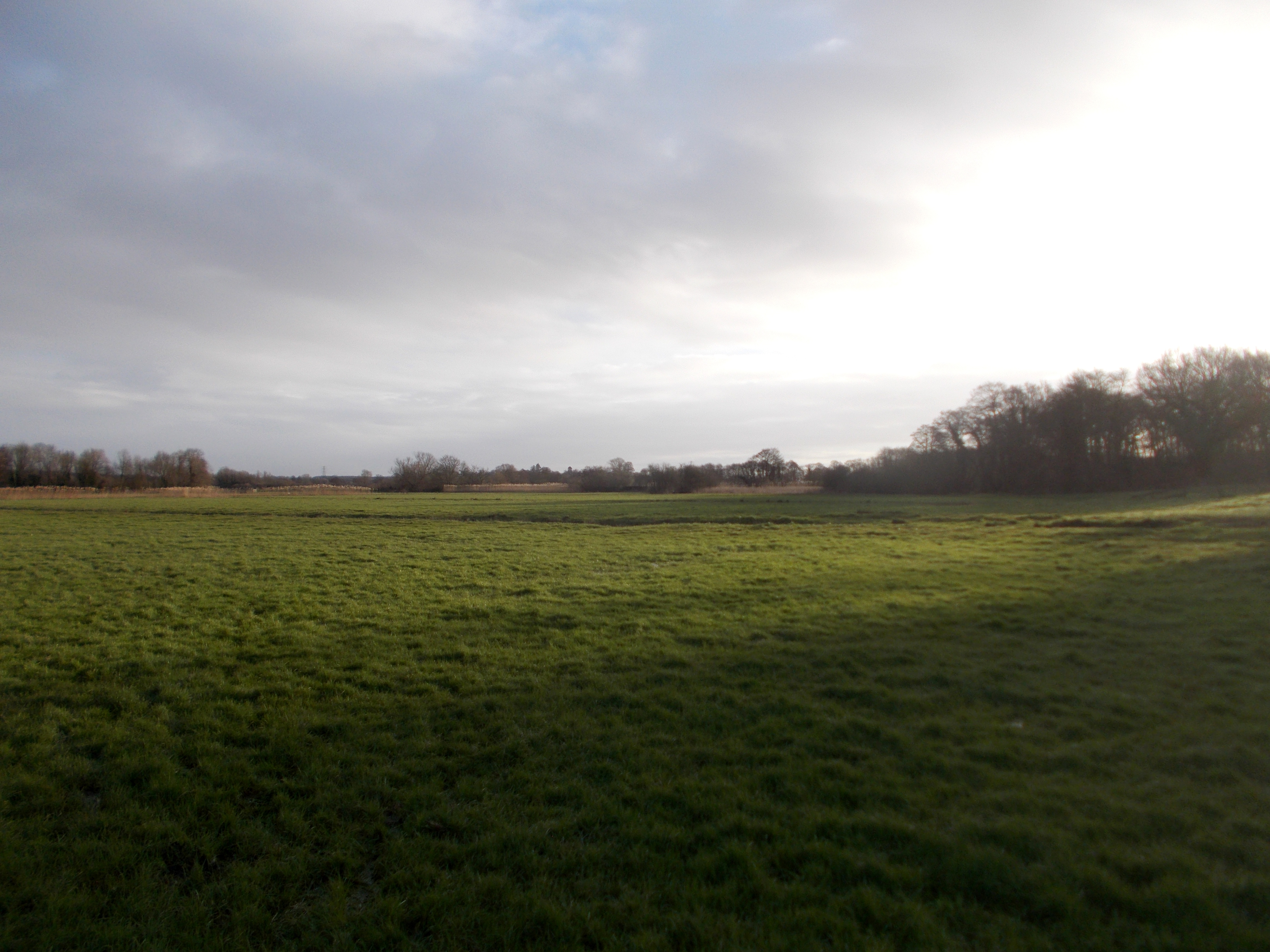
Waveney meadows at Geldeston looking east towards Barsham

In 1461 Richard Echyngham bequeathed Barsham Hall (with the advowson) to John, his son by Jane Picot, leaving a lifetime tenure of "The Knyghtes Chambyr" at the west end of the Hall to his mother, Dame Margaret, and the beds from the great chamber on the east side, and from the lesser chamber, to his widow Elizabeth (Jernegan), John's stepmother.

Barsham church (its east front flushwork and tracery showing the Echyngham fretty heraldry) and its rectory stand on rising land overlooking the Waveney valley from the south. The Hall was on the low ground some 600 metres to the north, at the edge of the river plain opposite Geldeston, and held fishery and swannery rights downstream towards Roos Hall fleet, rights which were defended at the common pleas. The manor lay near the Garneys residences at Roos Hall and Redisham Hall, and the manor of Shipmeadow, an endowment of Mettingham College.

John Echyngham married Anne Wingfield, daughter of Sir John Wingfield of Letheringham and his wife Elizabeth FitzLewis, and they became the parents of Edward Echingham of Barsham and his younger brother Francis. Among Anne's brothers were Sir Richard, Sir Robert and Sir Humphrey Wingfield. Her brother John Wingfield married Anne Tuchet (daughter of Anne Echyngham), whose son was Sir Anthony Wingfield. The death of Richard Echyngham's elder brother Thomas in 1483 without a surviving son left John and his descendants as the principal male representatives of the Echingham name, and John sought unsuccessfully to recover the Sussex estates in 1486. John Echyngham's last presentation to the rectory of Barsham was in 1514, and the next was made by Sir Edward in 1516.

== Actions in 1512–1514 ==
Edward Echyngham was already an experienced and trusted naval captain during his father's lifetime, before he inherited the lordship of Barsham. At the onset of Henry VIII's hostilities with the French, "Echyngham" supplied 9 soldiers for war in May 1512. After Lord Admiral Sir Edward Howard had harried the coasts of Brittany, and scoured those of Normandy, he lay off the Isle of Wight while "diverse shippes kept the North seas, under the conduite of sir Edward Ichyngham, Ihon Lewes, Ihon Louedaie, which diligently skowred the seas." The King armed his navy as ships of war, "and then caused soldiers mete for the same shippes, to muster on black Hethe, and he appointed captaines for that tyme, sir Anthony Oughtred, sir Edward Ichyngham, William Sidney, whiche shortly shipped and came before the Isle of Wight."

The King reviewed the navy at Portsmouth, making captains of Thomas Knevet and John Carew (for the Regent) and Charles Brandon and Henry Guildford (Soveraigne), and gave a banquet for all the captains, who swore before the king to defend and comfort one another. After Knyvet and Carew were lost with the Regent in August 1512, in September Echyngham was appointed to captain The Lizard, with Sir Weston Browne in The Great Bark and others, to keep the seas northerly for the winter. In February 1513 he was assigned to The Germyne with portage of 100, 10 men of his own, 10 of Sir Robert Lovell's and 40 of Sir Thomas Lovell's retinue, and 40 mariners: but by a further reassignment he captained the Second new Spaniard, of 280 tonnes, with the men of Coventry and of Sir Thomas Greynfeld, portage 198.

=== The engagement at Brest ===
By March 1513 a French fleet had assembled at Brest, and Lord Admiral Howard, sailing from the Thames on 10 March, left Plymouth with his fleet on 3 April to blockade them there, not waiting for supplies. Echyngham, taking his own ship, came out of Queenborough on 13 April 1513. Having pursued three French men of war to Fécamp Abbey, on 19 April he convoyed the supply ships safely past companies of French sail to the King's great army, which lay in the waters at Brest. Three days later the navy was attacked by 6 French galleys and 4 foysts, which then made up to White Sand Bay north of Le Conquet. The Admiral's plan to land 6000 men on 24 April was abandoned with the arrival of William Sabine of Ipswich, as the captains were engaged in victualling.

Howard's assault on the French galleys the following day ended in disaster: after boarding the galley of Prégent de Bidoux he became separated from his company, was thrust against the rails with morris-pikes, cast overboard, and drowned. The captains having chosen Lord Ferrers to lead them, Wulstan Brown sent Echyngham and Harper (John Baptist of Harwich) back to "Hampton" (i.e. Southampton) "for to wafte the vytlers unto them". The whole navy returned to Plymouth on 31 April, many suffering or dying from sickness. Echyngham, who met with William Gonson beyond Portland, having brought victuallers wrote to Wolsey on 5 May from Hampton: his letter reported eye-witness accounts, and spoke of the resolute leadership needed for further action against the enemy. Sabyn had written to Wolsey a week previously.

=== Continuing actions ===
Remaining with the Second new Spaniard, Echyngham was named in mid-May to join a further enterprise to distress the French navy, and, with his 100 men, among those to land with the Lord Lisle. Forces were gathered at Hampton, and Bishop Fox reported on 8 June that "Delabere and Ichyngham, Rote with his company and some of Lord Howard's folk departed to-day with a good wind". The accounts indicate the ship's name was Sancta Maria Sernago, and that the master, John Furnando, was Spanish.

As the Scots arose, Echyngham answered the summons to Newcastle in September, and in preparations for Flodden Field he was assigned to the forward company led by Lord Admiral Howard (i.e. Thomas Howard), "with suche as came from the sea", with Sir William Sydney, Lord Conyers, Lord Latimer, Lord Clifford, and others. He was knighted by the Earl of Surrey "after the fylde". Between March and June 1514 he appears as captain of one of the great ships, the Peter Pomegranate, of 450 tonnes and with a crew of 300.

== Home front ==
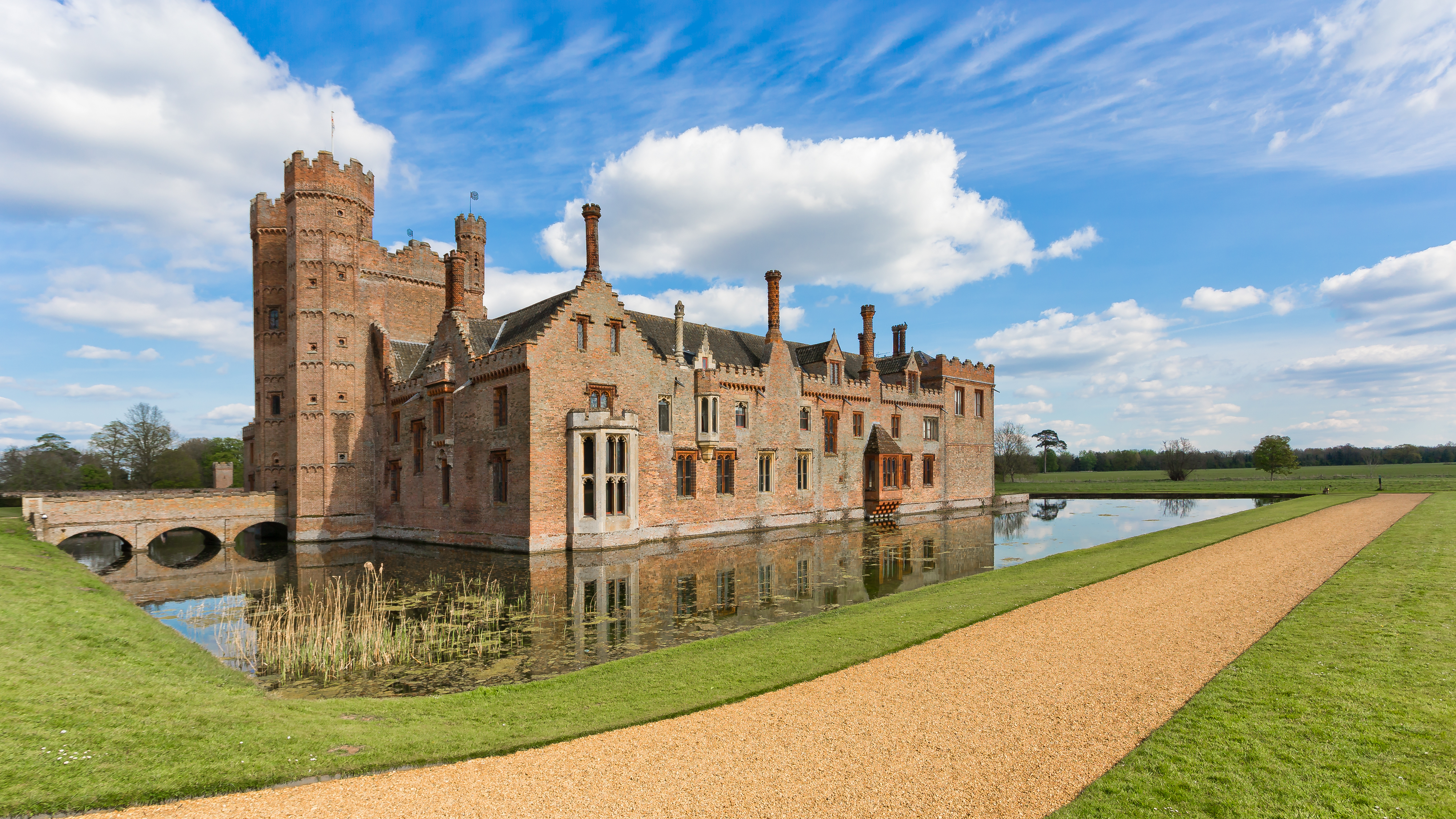
Oxburgh Hall, built by Mary Bedyngfield's father

=== The Bedyngfield marriage ===
Around 1515, Sir John Echyngham died and was buried on the north side of the chancel of Barsham church, and Sir Edward succeeded to his father's estate. It was after 1514 that he brought a plea against Edmund Bedingfield (junior) and the executors of Dame Margaret Bedingfield (Sir Edmund's second wife, who died in that year), concerning the marriage settlement of her daughter, Mary (Bedingfield), Echyngham's first wife.

Sir Edmund Bedingfield senior, the builder of Oxburgh Hall, Norfolk (which he had licence to crenellate in 1482), had died in January 1496–97: Marie Bedingfield is named in the 1487 will of Margaret's mother, Dame Agnes Scott (widow of Sir John Scott, Marshal of Calais (died 1485)), among the children of "my daughter Bedyngfeld".

The date of Echyngham's first marriage is uncertain, but by 1515 Osborne Ichyngham, apparently his son, though possibly illegitimate, had emerged as the confidential agent and messenger of Sir Thomas Spinelly, English Resident Ambassador in the Netherlands.

=== Service in Ipswich and Limerick ===
Between April 1515 and 1518 a series of accounts detail the controlment of Customs and Subsidies for the Port of Ipswich by Sir Edward Echyngham with the prominent Ipswich lawyer Thomas Rush. Echyngham had a dwelling in Ipswich, mentioned in his will, where his Wingfield kinsmen possessed one of the principal residences: between the Waveney and Orwell lay the entire sea-coast of Suffolk. In April 1517 Echyngham's uncle Sir Richard Wingfield, as Lord Deputy of Calais 1513–1519, prepared notices for Wolsey (Ipswich's most famous son) for the means of conveying men to take possession of Thérouanne, where the French king was attempting to establish a garrison. He proposed that men should be gathered in Norfolk, Suffolk and Essex, to take shipping at Orwell Haven for Calais under the guise of artificers bound for Tournai; he further desired that Sir Edward Echyngham should have their conveyance, under the Deputy.

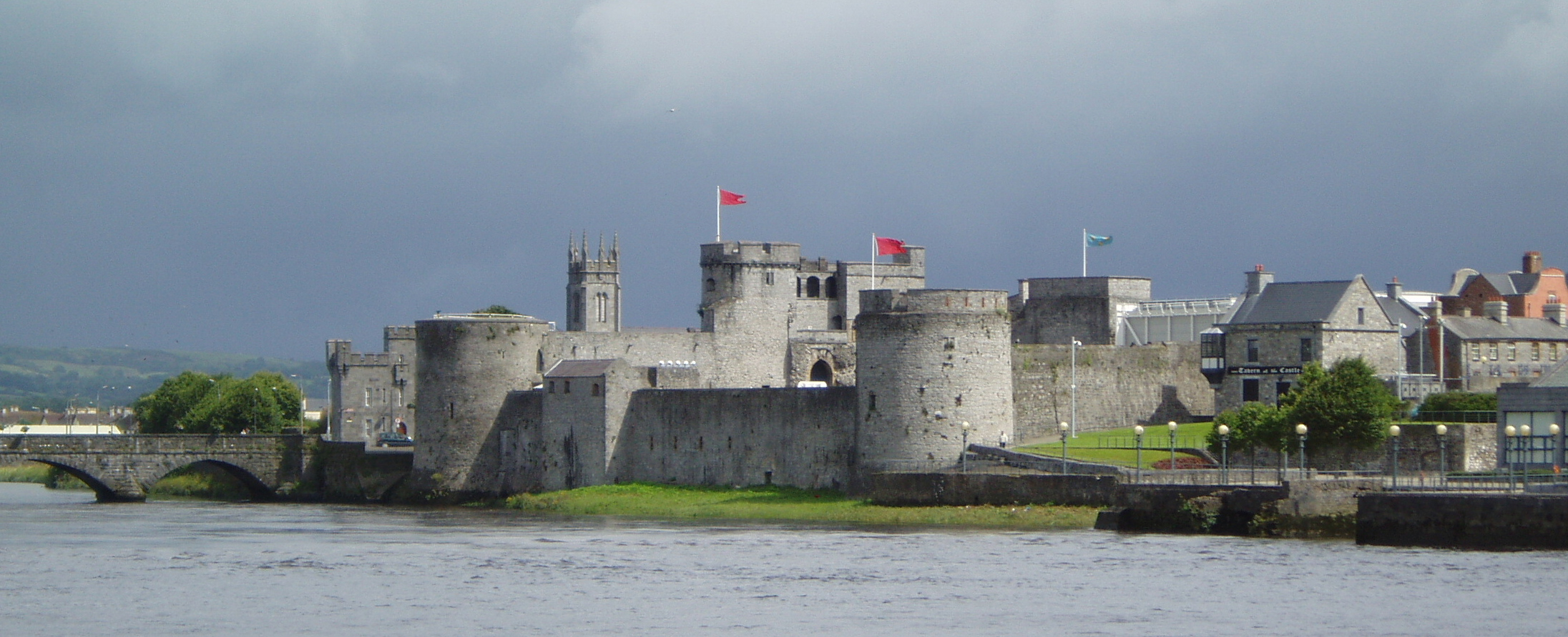
Limerick Castle on the Shannon

By Letters Patent of 15 January 1521–22 Echyngham was appointed Constable of Limerick Castle, with the island there, and with "le laxe Were" (i.e. the salmon weir) of Limerick (a possession of fishing rights). This was given under the Earl of Surrey (i.e. Lord Howard) as Lord Deputy of Ireland, and remained in force until February 1523–24. It may have been in this period that his first wife died, for she was buried "in Saint Patriks church in Devillyn in Irelonde on the north side of our ladies chapell". On 1 July 1522 he participated in the English assault on the Breton town of Morlaix. Having scoured the seas, Thomas Howard, 3rd Duke of Norfolk and Earl of Surrey, Lord Admiral and brother of the late Edward Howard, brought the whole fleet to the haven of Morlaix, and landed with his captains and their companies to the number of some 7000 men who with ordnance assaulted, took and despoiled the town. Sir Edward's company is at sea with 10 ships, at a cost of almost £550 for the month.

=== Marriage to Ann Everard ===
In about 1523 Sir Edward made his second marriage. Ann, daughter of John Everard of Cratfield and his wife Margaret Bedingfield (of a branch of that family seated at Ditchingham), had first married Edward Lewknor of Kingston Buci near Brighton, Sussex. Lewknor (died 1523) was a kinsman of Echyngham's, his grandmother Elizabeth (wife of Thomas Lewknor of Horsted Keynes, Sussex (died 1452)) being the sister of that Sir Thomas Echyngham who died in 1444 (the first of Barsham). Ann, Edward Lewknor's second wife, was the mother of his younger son (Richard) and three daughters. When Lewknor died in 1523 Sir Edward Echyngham married her, and became kin to her eldest brother John (seated at Gillingham opposite Barsham), to her brother William (died 1524/25) of Ovingdean in Sussex, and to her sister Olyve, wife to John Tasburgh of St Peter, South Elmham (died 1509), whose son John (died c.1552) purchased and settled at Flixton Priory.

In Trinity term 1523 Thomas Lord La Warr, Edward Lewknor, Ralph, Henry and William Everard and William's son John, John Baker and John Tasburgh were feoffees to effect a recovery by writ of super disseisinam in le post against Edward Echyngham of his manor and lands at Barsham, Shipmeadow, Ringsfield, Redisham, Beccles, Great Worlingham, South Cove and Kessingland, to his uses. In this period Echyngham brought suit against Sir Goddard Oxenbridge and Sir Andrew Wyndesore for title to the Echyngham manorial inheritance in Sussex, which had descended to them by marriage of the daughters of Thomas Echyngham the younger (died 1483), apparently without success. With Ann he had two daughters, Ann, born c. 1523, and Mary, born c. 1527. In Suffolk he received a Subsidy commission in 1524, and commissions for the peace in 1524 and 1526.

== Death and legacy ==
=== Echyngham's will ===
Chapel of St Katheryn

Echyngham made his will on 18 June and died at Barsham on 8 July, 1527. Feeling that he had "sumewhat fallen into age wherupon dependeth casualties and daungers of deth", he named St George, St Katheryn and St Anthony as his "advowerers", asking to be buried "before the Trinitie of Barham chirch on the north side under the foundacion of the Chauncel wall". He appointed that his executors should have a chapel built to St Katheryn, on the north side of Barsham Chauncell where his father lay buried, and that his mother, who was buried at Blundeston, was to be reburied with her husband. Carvings of his advowrers, in wood or freestone, were commissioned. A patron for the chapel was to be found at Rushworth College, where Sir Robert Wingfield was buried, and the chantry priest was to sing for his (Sir Edward's) soul, and for his wife Anne's soul, and for his former wife Mary's soul, and the souls of his father and mother, and of all his friends, for the space of three years. Fifty pounds owing to him from Sir Richard Wingfield, and a debt from William Everard's estate, are to go towards the building of the chapel.

The tomb

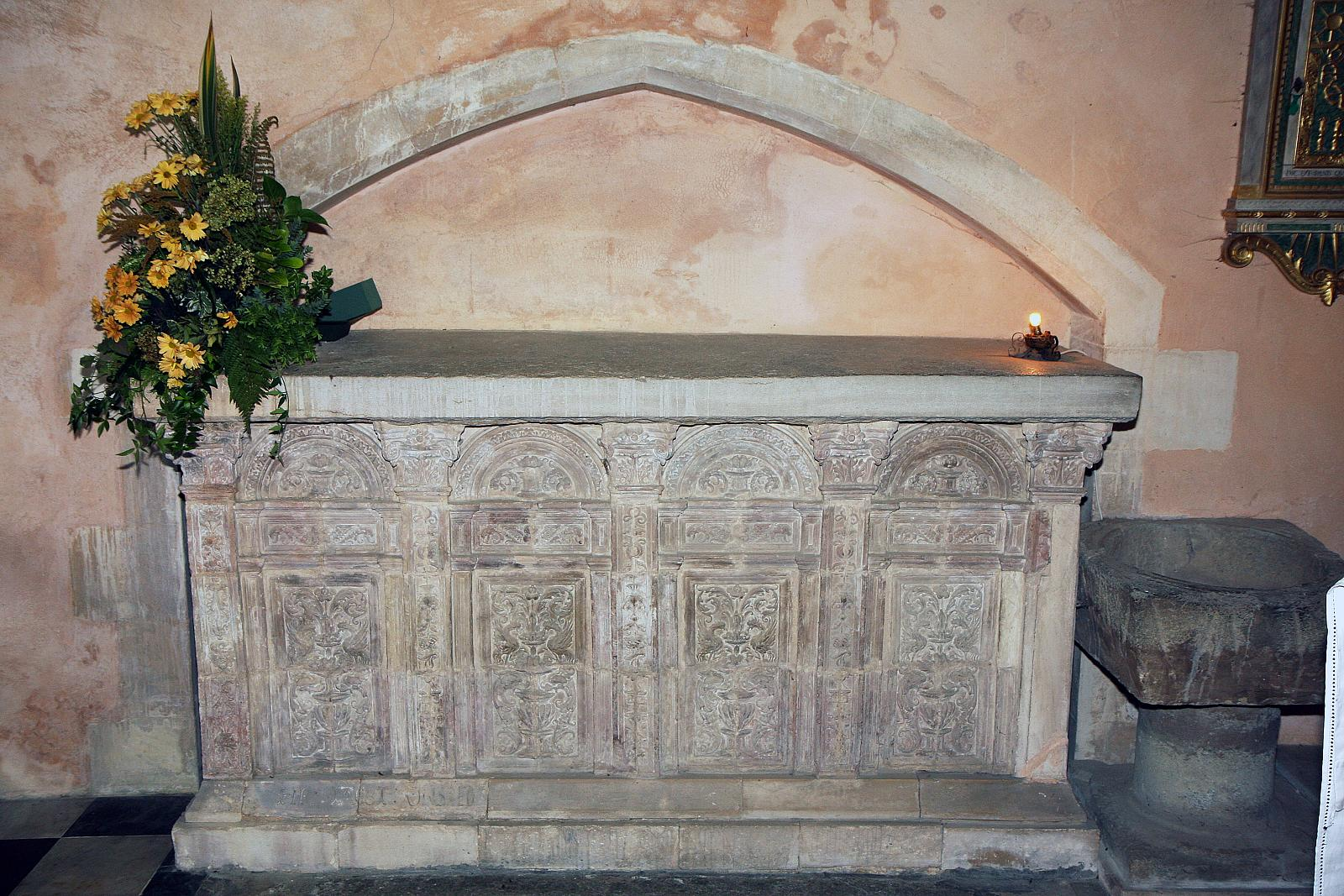
The restored tomb-chest from the monument to Sir Edward Echyngham at Barsham, constructed of terracotta panels in Italianate style

A table tomb set against, and partly into, the north wall of the chancel of Barsham church is evidently that of Sir Edward Echyngham. When it was dismantled and reconstructed in 1869, a fragment of an inscription "hic jacet d'n's Ed..." (Here lies lord Edward...) was found inside. What remains is only a fragment of a larger monument, which would have included the four-foot-high figures of his advowrer saints.

It is one of an important recognized series of East Anglian tombs made up of ornamental terracotta panels in Italianate style, a fashion which was expressed also in architectural details during the 1520s and 1530s. These works were particularly commissioned from itinerant craftsmen operating in East Anglia by a group of influential inter-related families with whom the Echynghams of Barsham were closely allied: these included in particular the Marneys of Layer Marney Tower (Essex), the Bedingfields of Oxburgh (Norfolk), and Sir Philip Bothe of Shrubland Old Hall near Coddenham (Suffolk). (Sir Philip's wife, Margaret Hopton, was great-aunt to Owen Hopton, who married Sir Edward's daughter Anne.) They held a prevailing interest in the cult of St Katheryn. Echyngham's first marriage linked directly to Oxburgh.

The intention was presumably for a tomb under an archway through the north chancel wall into the new chapel of St Katheryn on the north side of the chancel. The ornament of the surviving tomb panels is not heraldic, but, seen from the interior, the tracery of the east window as a reversed shield fretty (azure supplied by sky or by blue glass) would have cast its lights and shadows through the chancel to appropriate Echyngham heraldic effect.

Estates

Sir Edward's manors were entailed to his wife Anne for her jointure for life, and to the heirs males of his two daughters, or in default of such issue to the heirs of his brother Francis, or in default to Osborne Ichyngham and his heirs males: or in default of all these, then all to remain unto the heires of "my seyd uncle" Humfrey Wingfield Esquier for "the famylyar acqueyntance from our childhood unto this day"; or lastly to the right heirs of his ancestor Sir William Echyngham. Various houses at Kessingland, Shipmeadow and Barsham are left to Osborne. But Ann was to have all the manors, lands and tenements assigned to her by appointment and recovery: Ann Echyngham, Humfrey Wingfield and Ralph Everard are his executors, and Ann became seised in right of free tenement. By 1540 Osborne was in Ireland, where he acquired estates, which after his death in 1546 descended to his elder sons, while his youngest inherited his English lands.

The Barsham dole

Bequests to the Everards and to Richard Lewknor follow, and he asks that the old usage and custime of the "dole" should be kept up by which every man, woman and childe who should attend the five masses of requiem to be sung in St Katheryn's chapel should return to the manor place and should receive every one of them two red herrings, a white herring and a temse loaf (made from sifted flour), and something to drink: and those that serve them should have their dinner for their trouble, and this dole was to "continue and endure for evermore".

=== Anne Echyngham's widowhood ===
In Echyngham's will, Sir Brian Tuke is given freely the marriages of Echyngham's daughters if he shall recover for them the Echyngham inheritance in Sussex, or else he shall pay £400 for them, the testator wishing that they shall be married to Tuke's sons.

These girls were very young at the time of their father's death, and remained unmarried during their mother's lifetime. Dame Ann Echyngham made her nuncupative will at Barsham on the day of her death, 14 November 1538, requesting the fulfilment of Maister Echyngham's will (which provided for his daughters). Her own goods were to be sold, and the money divided between her four Lewknor children: her daughters Elizabeth and Dorothy were present as witnesses, and John Everard, Richard Lewknor and Edward Tasburgh were named her executors. Money had been paid to Edmund Billingford of Stoke Holy Cross for his son Thomas to marry Ann's daughter Elizabeth Lewknor, but Elizabeth refused the union and John Everard was obliged to seek its return through the Court of Chancery.

=== The Echyngham daughters ===
As to the two daughters, the coheirs, of Sir Edward, according to a letter of Anthony Rous of Dennington to Thomas Cromwell, Good Friday 1539, the elder (then about 16), Anne Echyngham, was sent to her kinsman Richard Wharton, Bailey of Bungay, and arrangements (not fulfilled) were being made for her marriage to "Mr Hogon's eldest son". (Wharton, who in 1533 had advised Cromwell of John Tasburgh's disposable income, was granted nearby Flixton Priory at its dissolution in 1537: in 1544 he sold the priory to John Tasburgh.) The younger daughter (then aged 10 or 11), Mary Echyngham, was placed in the care of Philip Bedingfield of Ditchingham.

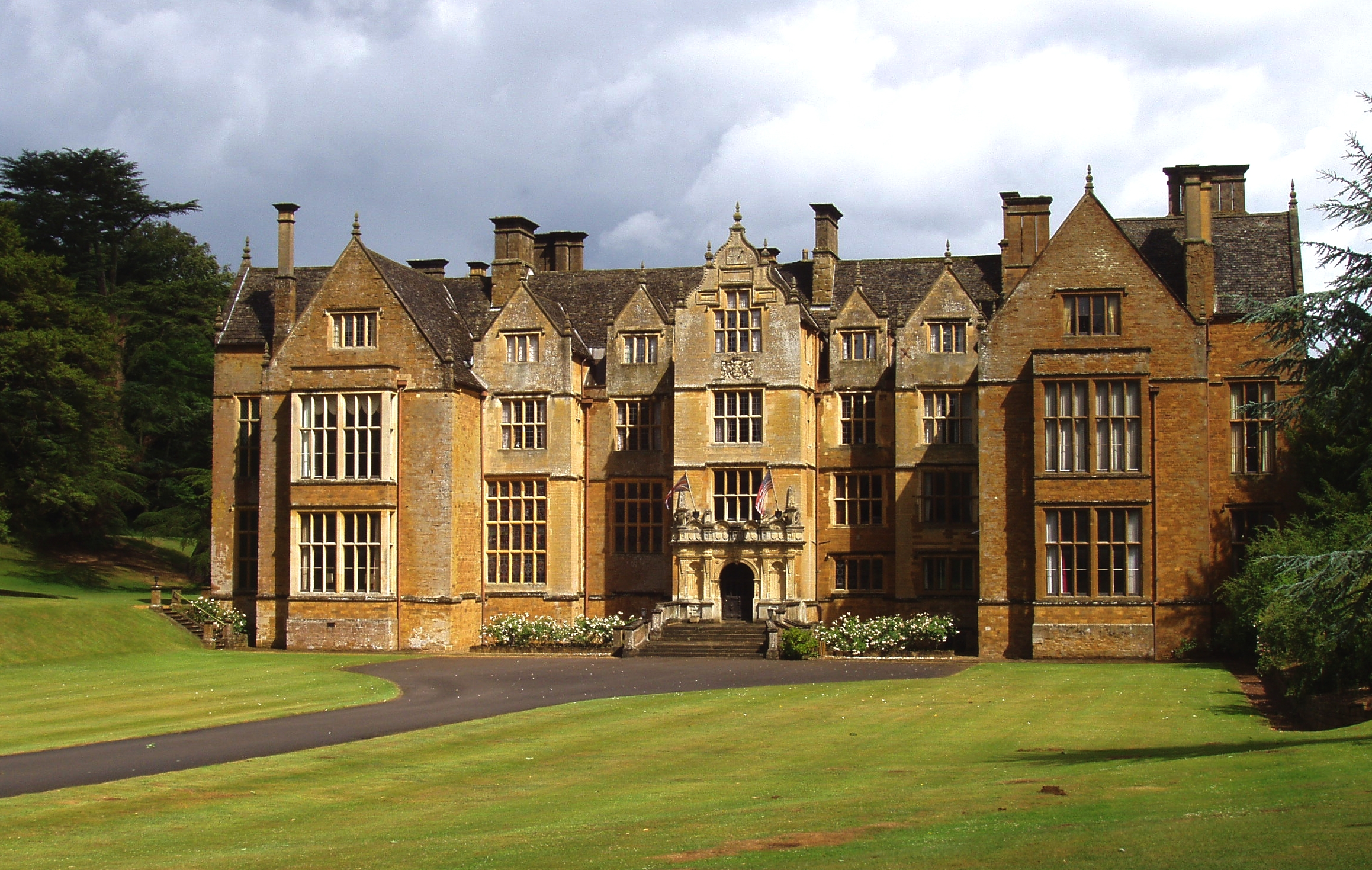
Wroxton Manor (Oxfordshire), built by Sir William Pope, Earl of Downe in 1618.

- Anne Echyngham, born c. 1523. She was married to Sir Owen Hopton of Cockfield Hall, Yoxford, and of Westwood, Blythburgh. Shortly before 1539 the Duke of Norfolk had defeated the expectation of Sir Arthur Hopton, his father, in the purchase of Sibton Abbey. Sir Owen became Lieutenant of the Tower of London, and died in 1595. At some time Anne had possession of that 13th-century vellum book of French romance poetry containing the unique text of Roman de Waldef, with Gui de Warewic and the chanson de geste Otinel, acquired apparently from Lady Katherine Grey (who died in captivity at Cockfield Hall in 1568). According to a memorial inscription at Wroxton, Oxfordshire (the home of her daughter Anne in her second marriage), she died and was buried at Wroxton in 1599 aged 72 (should be nearer 76), leaving five children living: Two additional sons are listed in the 1561 Visitation of Suffolk.
  - Arthur Hopton Esquire.
  - William Hopton Esquire, living in 1600.
  - George Hopton, died without issue.
  - Ralph Hopton, died without issue.
  - Anne Hopton (Countess of Downe), married (1) Henry Wentworth, 3rd Baron Wentworth (1558–1593), and (2) Sir William Pope of Wroxton, Oxfordshire, Earl of Downe (died 1631).
  - Mary Hopton (Lady Chandos), married William Brydges, 4th Baron Chandos (1552–1602).
  - Cicelie Hopton (Mrs Cicelie Marshall).
- Mary Echyngham, born c. 1527. Anthony Rous wrote to Cromwell on 4 April 1539 complaining that Philip Bedyngfeld had, without consultation, delivered her to Mr Holdych, steward of the Duke of Norfolk's house, who proposed to marry her to his son. Rous asked that Holdych be ordered to deliver her to Humfrey Wingfield, and that Cromwell should advance his (Rous's) wish that she marry one of his own sons. Cromwell made the assignment to Rous, with instructions to Holdych to surrender the girl: but he refused, and Cromwell received letters from the Duke of Norfolk saying that he took Cromwell's decision to heart very grievously. On 14 April Rous wrote again with an attestation forwarded and signed by Richard Wharton, Richard Calthorpe, John and Edward Tasburgh, John Everard and Richard Lewknor, begging that she should not be married without their consent. On 19 April Cromwell forwarded the Duke's letters to the King, asking him of his great wisdom to determine the merits of the case. In the event Mary was married (as his second wife) to John Blennerhassett, legal adviser to the Duke of Norfolk. John was the youngest son of Sir Thomas Blennerhassett of Frenze, Norfolk by his second wife Margaret Braham of Wetheringsett, and brother to Anthony Rous's wife Agnes Blennerhassett. John Blennerhassett and Mary Echyngham bought out Anne's share of Barsham and lived at Barsham Hall, and had five sons and four daughters surviving at his death, which occurred in 1573.
  - Thomas Blennerhassett (son and heir), married Mary, daughter of Sir Christopher Heydon of Baconsthorpe Castle, and had issue.
  - Edward, John, George and Richard Blennerhassett. Also Ralph Blennerhassett (died in infancy).
  - Helen Blennerhassett, married Henry Gurney Esq. of West Barsham, Norfolk in 1571.
  - Katherine, Fraunces and Anne Blennerhassett. Also Margaret Blennerhassett (died in youth).
