= Barsham, Suffolk =

Village in Suffolk, England

Coordinates: 52.450°N 1.526°E

Barsham
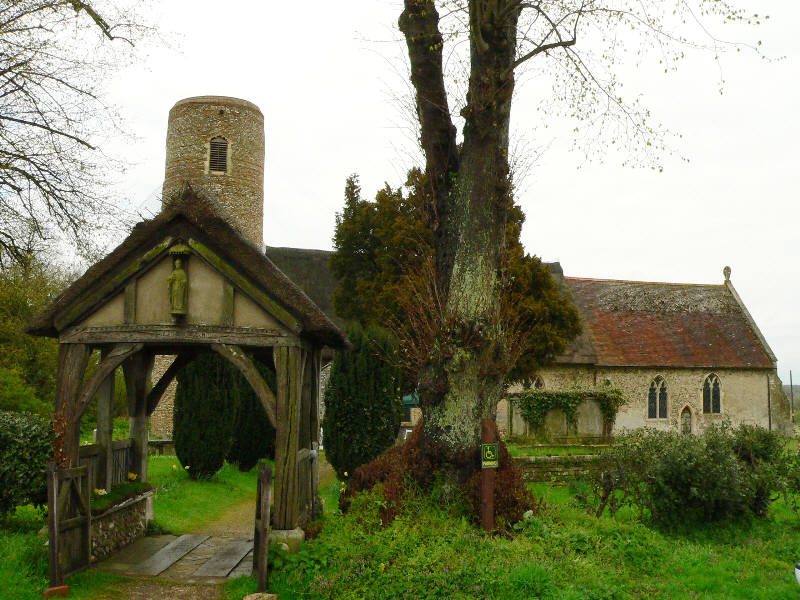
- Barsham Holy Trinity church

- Location within Suffolk
- Area: 7 km^{2} (2.7 sq mi)
- Population: 215 (2011)
  - Density: 31/km^{2} (80/sq mi)
- OS grid reference: TM395899
- District: East Suffolk
- Shire county: Suffolk
- Region: East
- Country: England
- Sovereign state: United Kingdom
- Post town: Beccles
- Postcode district: NR34
- Dialling code: 01502
- UK Parliament: Waveney

Barsham is a village and civil parish in the East Suffolk district of the English county of Suffolk. It is about 2 miles (3.2 km) west of Beccles, south of the River Waveney on the edge of The Broads National Park. It is spread either side of the B1062 Beccles to Bungay road.

At the 2011 United Kingdom census the parish had a population of 215. The parish council is jointly operated with neighbouring Shipmeadow, with the two parishes sharing a village hall. Other than this and the parish church, there are no services in the parish.

The parish borders the parishes of Beccles, Shipmeadow, Ringsfield and Ilketshall St Andrew. The River Waveney marks the county boundary with Norfolk and the parishes of Geldeston and Gillingham border Barsham to the north of the river.

== History ==
Barsham Holy Trinity is one of around 40 round-tower churches in Suffolk (Note: The exact number of round-tower churches in the county is a matter of debate. Some sources list 38, others cite between 40 and 43. They almost all date from the late Anglo-Saxon or early Norman periods and were mostly built between the 11th and 14th-centuries. There are around 183 round-tower churches in England, most of them in Norfolk, which has around 124, and Suffolk. Four of the churches now in Norfolk were previously in Suffolk before boundary changes in 1974.) and a Grade I listed building. The manor and advowson were of old in the de Tye family, but during the early 15th century they passed into the Echyngham family, whose principal seat was at Etchingham in Sussex. This arose through the marriages of Margaret Knyvet of Mendlesham (granddaughter of John Knyvet the Lord Chancellor), who married first Robert de Tye (died 1415) (whose brass is in Barsham church), secondly Sir Thomas Marney of Layer Marney in Essex (died 1421), and lastly Sir Thomas Echyngham (died 1444) (whose brass is at Etchingham in Sussex). Margaret outlived them all. Her great-grandson, Sir Edward Echyngham of Barsham, was a notable sea captain in the navy of King Henry VIII, and Sir Edward's son Osborne Ichyngham became Marshal of Ireland, though remembering Barsham in his will. The east wall of Barsham church shows unusual flushwork and tracery of diaper or fret ornament, probably representing the Echyngham heraldic coat of azure fretty argent.

Mary Echyngham, Sir Edward's younger daughter, married John Blennerhasset and they lived at Barsham Hall, on the edge of the Waveney meadows below the church, and rebuilt or remodelled it. John's son Thomas Blennerhasset inherited it in 1573 and in 1598 sold it, together with all the other very extensive rights, lands and messuages in many surrounding parishes, to Sir Robert Lee (who became Lord Mayor of London in 1602), for £3,600. Sir Robert died in 1605 having settled Barsham manor on his son (Sir) John Lee, then in his minority. In 1623 Sir John Lee sold the same premises for an undisclosed sum to Sir John Suckling, Comptroller of the Household, who had acquired the neighbouring estate of Roos Hall as his residence in 1600. From his time Barsham descended in the Suckling family.

Horatio Nelson's mother Catherine Suckling was born in the former rectory on 9 May 1725. She was important to him, despite her death when he was just nine years old — "the thought of former days brings all my mother to my heart, which shows itself in my eyes," he later recorded. The house is near the main road, close to the church, which has a stained glass window commemorating the Battle of Trafalgar.

Between 1972 and 1976, Barsham was the site of Barsham Faire.
