= Sir Robert Rich, 4th Baronet =

British Army officer and politician (1685–1768)

Field Marshal Sir Robert Rich Bt
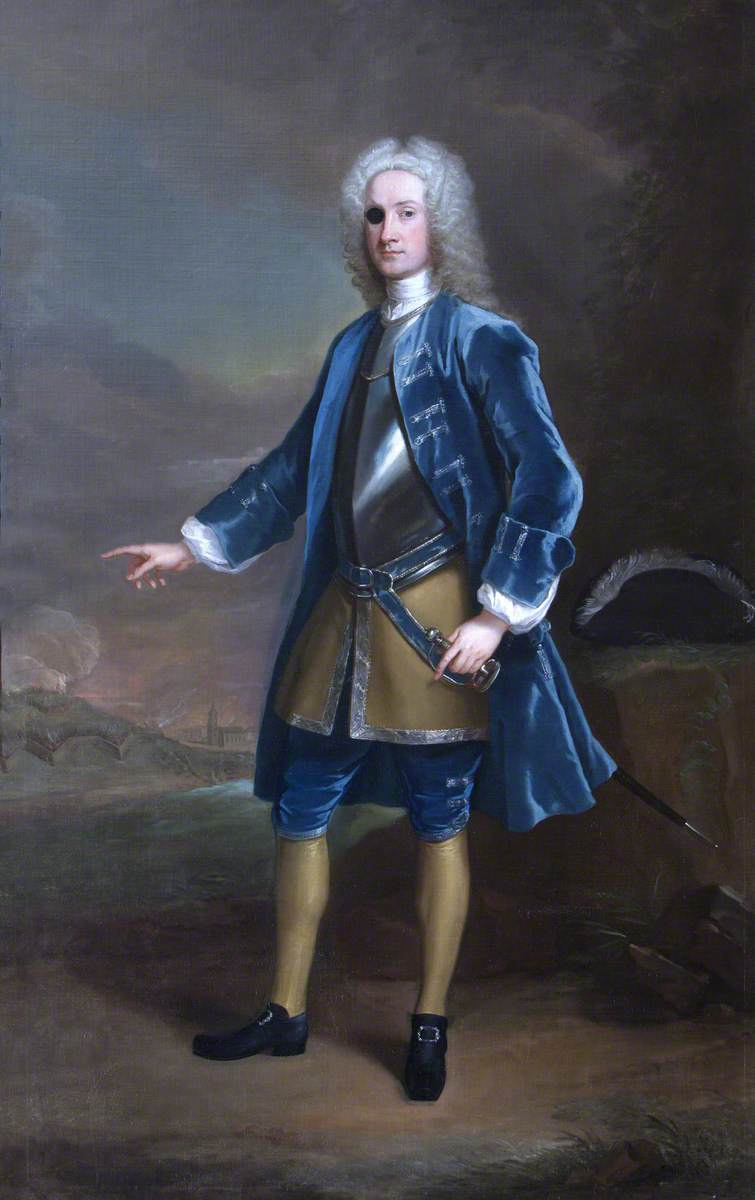
- Portrait by William Aikman, 1729
- Born: 3 July 1685; Roos Hall, Beccles, Suffolk, England
- Died: 1 February 1768 (aged 82); Roos Hall, Beccles, Suffolk, Great Britain
- Military career
- Allegiance: Kingdom of England; Kingdom of Great Britain
- Branch: English Army; British Army
- Service years: 1700–1768
- Rank: Field Marshal
- Conflicts: War of the Spanish Succession; War of the Austrian Succession

Field Marshal Sir Robert Rich, 4th Baronet (3 July 1685 – 1 February 1768) was a British Army officer and politician. As a junior officer he fought at the Battle of Schellenberg and at the Battle of Blenheim during the War of the Spanish Succession. He was then asked to raise a regiment to combat the threat from the Jacobite rising of 1715. He also served with the Pragmatic Army under the Earl of Stair at the Battle of Dettingen during the War of the Austrian Succession. As a Member of Parliament he represented three different constituencies but never attained political office.

== Career ==
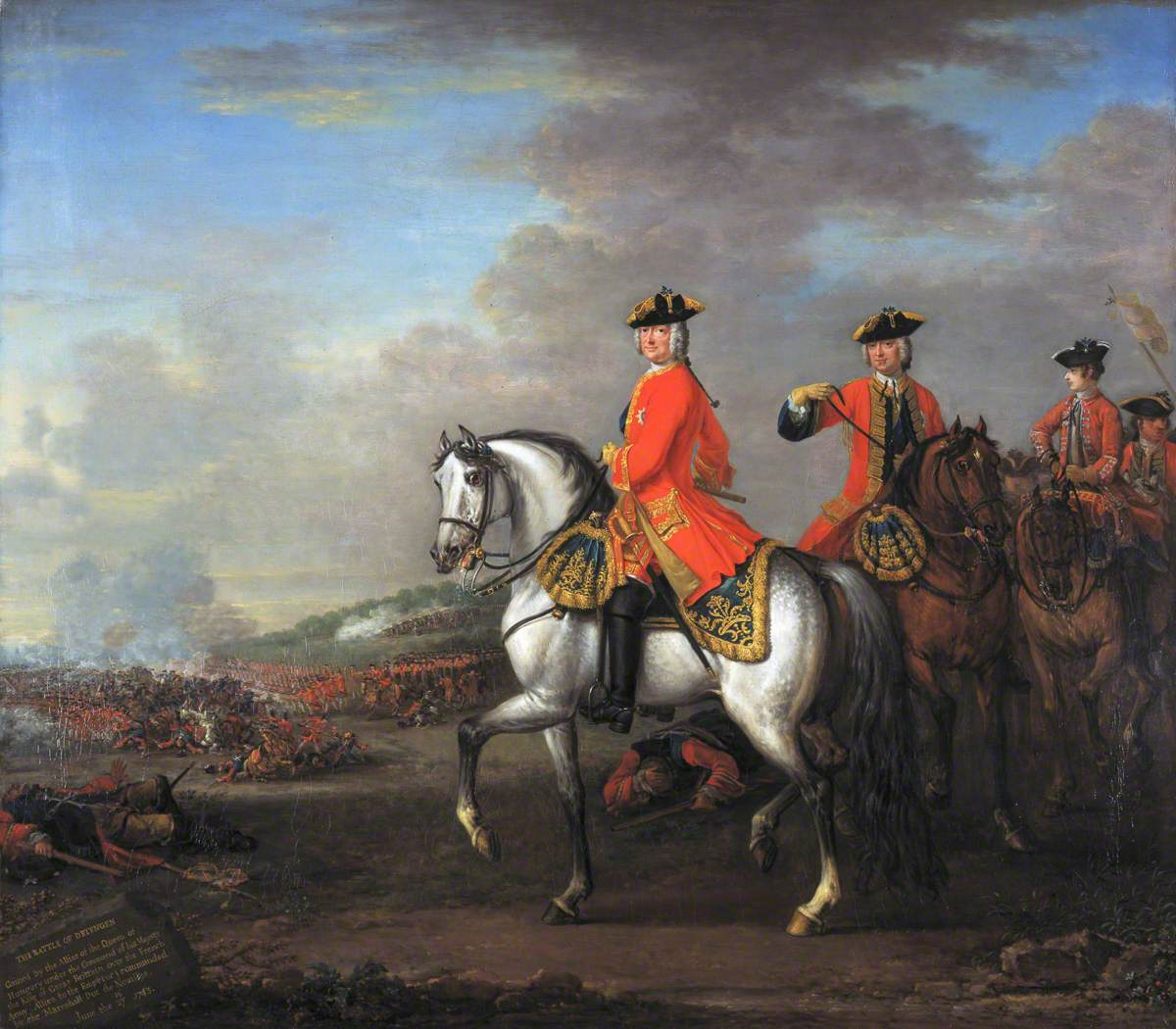
Rich fought under the Earl of Stair at the Battle of Dettingen.

Born the son of Sir Robert Rich, 2nd Baronet and Mary Rich (née Rich, daughter of Sir Charles Rich, 1st Baronet), Rich was commissioned as an ensign in the 1st Regiment of Foot Guards and lieutenant in the Army on 10 June 1700.

He fought in the War of the Spanish Succession at the Battle of Schellenberg in July 1704, where he was wounded, and at the Battle of Blenheim in August 1704, where he was wounded again. Promoted to lieutenant in the Brigadier-General Tatton's Regiment and captain in the Army, he succeeded his brother Charles as 4th Baronet in October 1706, and was then promoted to captain in the 1st Regiment of Foot Guards and lieutenant-colonel in the Army in March 1708. In June 1708 he fought a duel with Sir Edmund Bacon, 4th Baronet who was wounded but survived.

When the threat of the Jacobite rising of 1715 became apparent Rich was asked to raise a regiment which subsequently became known as the 18th Dragoons. That year he was also elected Member of Parliament for Dunwich. In June 1717 he was stripped of his regiment for voting against the Government on a motion accusing Lord Cadogan of fraud and embezzlement during the transport of some Dutch troops. He was defeated in the general election in 1722 but having strongly supported Sir Robert Walpole, firstly when Walpole was in opposition and then when Walpole was in the Government, was rewarded with the colonelcy of the 13th Hussars in November 1722.

He was elected as Member of Parliament for Bere Alston in February 1724 and became colonel of Sir Robert Rich's Regiment of Dragoons in September 1725. In 1727 he changed constituency to become Member of Parliament for St Ives and was appointed a Groom of the Bedchamber to King George II, a position he held until 1759.

Having been promoted to brigadier-general on 15 March 1727, he went on to be colonel of The King's Regiment of Carabineers in January 1731, colonel of the 1st Troop Horse of Grenadier Guards in July 1733 and, finally, colonel of the 4th Regiment of Dragoons in May 1735.

Promoted to major-general on 18 December 1735 and lieutenant general on 17 July 1739, Rich became Governor of the Royal Hospital Chelsea in May 1740. He served with the Pragmatic Army under the Earl of Stair at the Battle of Dettingen in June 1743 during the War of the Austrian Succession. He also presided over a court martial of Lieutenant-General Thomas Fowke, Governor of Gibraltar, on a charge of disobeying orders in August 1756.

Rich was promoted to general of horse on 24 March 1746 and to field marshal on 3 December 1757. In retirement he continued to live in the family home, Roos Hall in Beccles. He died on 1 February 1768.

== Family ==
In 1710 Rich married Elizabeth Griffith; they had three sons, including Sir Robert Rich, 5th Baronet and Sir George Rich, 6th Baronet, and one daughter, Elizabeth, who married George Lyttelton, 1st Baron Lyttelton.

== Sources ==
- Heathcote, Tony (1999). The British Field Marshals 1736–1997. Pen & Sword Books Ltd. ISBN 0-85052-696-5.
- Mosley, Charles (2003). Burke's Peerage, Baronetage & Knightage, 107th edition, Volumes I. Burke's Peerage (Genealogical Books) Ltd. ISBN 978-0971196629.

Parliament of Great Britain
Preceded by Sir George Downing, Bt; Sir Robert Kemp, Bt	Member of Parliament for Dunwich; 1715–1722; With: Charles Long	Succeeded by Sir George Downing, Bt; Edward Vernon
Preceded by St John Brodrick; Sir John Hobart, Bt	Member of Parliament for Bere Alston; 1724–1727; With: St John Brodrick	Succeeded by Sir John Hobart, Bt; Sir Francis Henry Drake, Bt
Preceded by Sir John Hobart, Bt; Henry Knollys	Member of Parliament for St Ives; 1727–1741; With: Henry Knollys 1727–1734; William Mackworth Praed 1734–1741	Succeeded by John Bristow; Gregory Beake
Military offices
Preceded by Regiment raised	Colonel of the 18th Dragoons; 1715–1717	Succeeded by James Crofts
Preceded by Richard Munden	Colonel of Rich's Regiment of Dragoons; 1722–1725	Succeeded by The Earl of Harrington
Preceded by Richard Munden	Colonel of Rich's Regiment of Dragoons; 1725–1731	Succeeded by The Lord Cathcart
Preceded by The Earl of Deloraine	Colonel of The King's Regiment of Carabineers; 1731–1733	Succeeded by The Lord Cathcart
Preceded by Hon. John Fane	Captain and Colonel of the 1st Troop of Horse Grenadier Guards; 1733–1735	Succeeded by Sir Charles Hotham, Bt
Preceded by William Evans	Colonel of the 4th Regiment of Dragoons; 1735–1768	Succeeded by Henry Seymour Conway
Honorary titles
Preceded by William Evans	Governor, Royal Hospital Chelsea; 1740–1768	Succeeded by Sir George Howard
Baronetage of England
Preceded by Charles Rich	Baronet (of London); 1706–1768	Succeeded by Robert Rich
