= Osborne Ichyngham =

Irish official

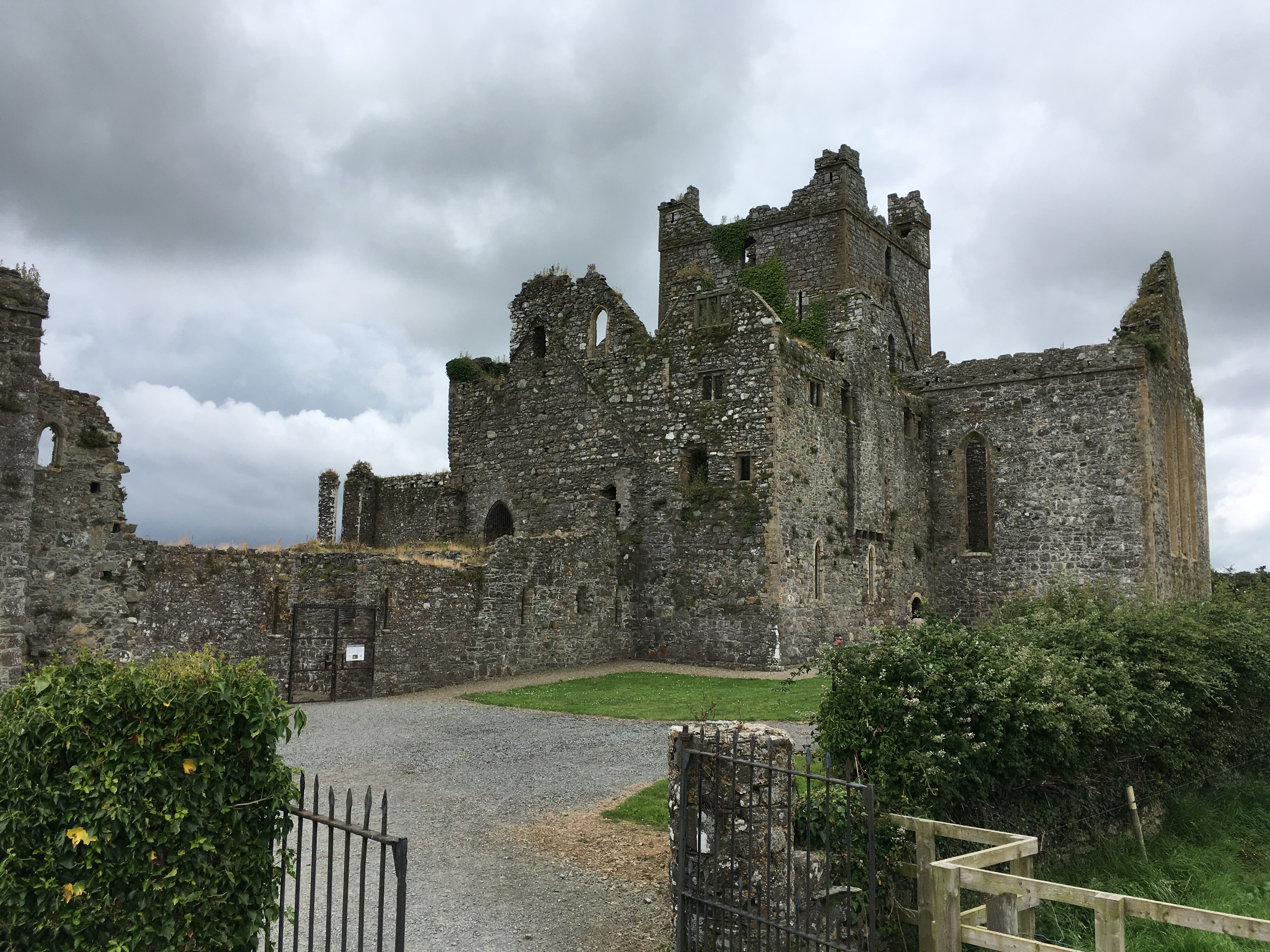
Dunbrody Abbey, granted to Osborne Ichyngham in 1545

Sir Osborne Ichyngham or Echyngham (died 1546) was an English official and landowner in Ireland.

== Biography ==
Ichyngham was apparently a son of Sir Edward Echyngham of Barsham, Suffolk. He was, perhaps, not a legitimate son, since Echyngham's daughters had priority in inheritance. The change in spelling of the surname may represent an appropriation of, or assimilation to, the place-name Ditchingham, nearby to Barsham.

By 1515 Ichyngham had emerged as the confidential agent and messenger of Sir Thomas Spinelly, English Resident Ambassador in the Netherlands. In February 1514–15 his presence is requested by Spinelly, in his message from Antwerp advising Wolsey that a marriage between Charles Brandon (Lord Lisle, Duke of Suffolk) and Queen Mary, Henry's sister, was rumoured. In 1520 Spinelly thought him a discreet young fellow: after Spinelly's death in 1522 King Henry chose him to ride post with secret papers to and from Valladolid during Bishop Lee's mission in 1526, and sent him as an envoy to the King of Hungary in 1530. He inherited lands and a house in Shipmeadow and Barsham from his father in 1527, and was knighted in 1529.

Ichyngham established himself and his line in Ireland, where by 1540 he became provost marshal, though retaining his connection with Barsham. Party to the 1542 Indenture between Lord Deputy St Leger and the Irish chieftains, in 1543 after the dissolution of the Irish monasteries he was granted the Cistercian house of Monasteranenagh Abbey, County Limerick, with its possessions. In 1545, at his petition, the King granted to him and his heirs the former Dunbrody Abbey, County Wexford, Ireland, with all its manors, lands, churches, chapels and possessions, in exchange for the manor of Netherhall in Hickling, Norfolk. The Dunbrody lands were called a "waste" estate, but commanded the outflow of the Three Sisters and the eastern shore of Waterford Harbour from Ballyhack down to Duncannon, across the Hook Peninsula to Coole, Ballyvelig, Tinnock and Curraghmore, and crossing below the estates of Tintern Abbey to the inlet from Bannow Bay at Ballygow (Poulfur). This, it was hoped, would prove a useful vantage from which to control the Cavanaghs, historic rulers of the Kingdom of Leinster. Osborne died in 1546, requesting that his heart be buried at Barsham.

== Descendants ==
Ichyngham made two marriages, the first to Katherine, who was buried under the church porch at Barsham, and secondly (by 1529) to Mary, who was buried at Barsham in 1584. By his second marriage he had three children:

- Edward Echingham inherited the Dunbrody estate from his father, in fee tail. He died without issue.
- Charles Echingham was heir to his brother, and he or his descendants succeeded to Dunbrody. He was the father of
  - John Echingham (died 1616), who married Margaret Whittie (afterwards wife of Sir Terence O'Dempsey, 1st Viscount Clanmalier). John's son and heir was a younger Osborn Echingham (died 1635), who redeemed his father's many feoffments. Osborn's son Sir John Itchingham in 17 Charles I barred all entails to his estate, and by his will of 1650 bestowed it upon his daughter Jane Ichyngham. She married Arthur Chichester, 2nd Earl of Donegall; their descendants, the Marquesses of Donegall, quarter the arms of Echyngham.
- George Echingham had from his father a manor called Rothenhall in Kessingland and Pakefield, Suffolk; but although there was a manor of that name, it was the manor of Echinghams in Kessingland (perhaps a division or parcel of the other) which descended in the family.
