= Bruce Lacey =

British artist (1927–2016)

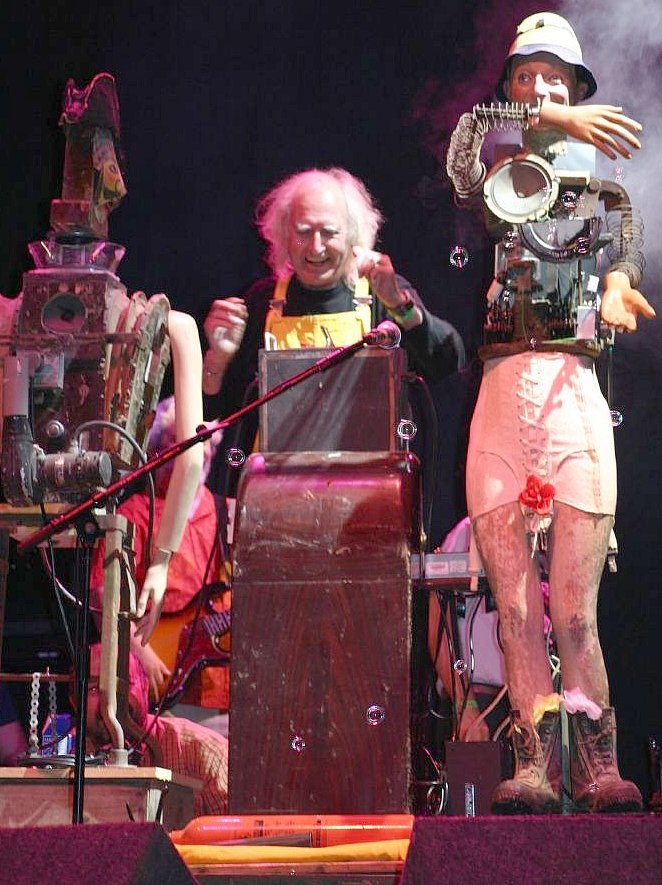
- On stage with Fairport Convention, 14 August 2004. Photograph: Brian Marks

Background information
- Born: 31 March 1927
- Died: 18 February 2016 (aged 88)
- Occupations: Performer, artist

Bruce Lacey (31 March 1927 – 18 February 2016) was a British artist, performer and eccentric. After completing his national service in the Navy he became established on the avant garde scene with his performance art and mechanical constructs. He has been closely associated with The Alberts performance group and The Goon Show. He made the props and had an acting part in Richard Lester's The Running Jumping & Standing Still Film.

== Career ==
Ken Russell made a fifteen-minute film about him called The Preservation Man (1962), which linked Lacey to Chaplin (in a Keystone Cops-style sequence) and featured some of Lacey's nightclub act (knife-throwing/robots) and a lip-synched performance of "Sleepy Valley", which Lacey had recorded with The Alberts. Along with The Alberts, he starred in two short comedy films (Uncles Tea Party and Defective Detectives), directed by pinup photographer George Harrison Marks.

In The Knack ...and How to Get It, he played the Surveyor's assistant. In the 1967 comedy film Smashing Time, a mad scientist. But his most famous appearance on film remains George Harrison's flute-playing gardener, in the Beatles' 1965 feature film, Help!. He made and animated many of the props for Michael Bentine's It's a Square World. Lacey also made a notable appearance in the comedian Dave Allen's BBC documentary film Dave Allen In Search Of The Great English Eccentric (1974).

Lacey contributed to Jasia Reichardt's Cybernetic Serendipity exhibition in 1968 at the Institute of Contemporary Arts, exhibiting a robotic owl and actors: Rosa Bosom and Mate plus a sex-simulator. In the same year he also worked on developing Humanoid Structures with Joan Littlewood for her Fun Palaces scheme called 'Bubble City' at the City of London Festival. He also exhibited his The British Landing on the Moon in Simon Chapman's 1969 Cybervironment Plus, an experimental arts festival at Aston University, Birmingham. Photographs of some of his mechanical devices can be found in Reichardt's book, Robots (Thames and Hudson, 1978).

He studied at Hornsey College of Art from 1948 and then at the Royal College of Art in the early 1950s. In the 1960s and 1970s, he was a visiting professor at Art Colleges from St Ives to Leeds. His mechanical statue "The Womaniser" (1966) is one of two pieces of his bought by the Tate.

Lacey's robots appeared on the Fairport Convention L.P. What We Did On Our Holidays in the song "Mr Lacey", written by Ashley Hutchings. The song is about Lacey, and the noise of his robots (which he brought into the studio) contribute the "instrumental break". He toured England in the 1970s with his children's sci-fi theatre show and became involved in "Earth Magic" with his then wife, actress Jill Bruce, mounting a number of performance pieces and exhibitions.

They moved to Wymondham in Norfolk and became part of a fair making network, Albion Fairs. Specifically, he was responsible for running the "Faerie Fair" at Lyng, Norfolk in 1981-82. There was a major retrospective of his life and art at the Glasgow Museum of Modern Art in 1996. A major survey of his work ran at the Camden Arts Centre from 7 July to 16 September 2012.

He died on 18 February 2016 at the age of 88.
