= Charles Rich =

Charles Rich may refer to:

- Charles Rich, 4th Earl of Warwick (1619–1673), English peer and member of the House of Lords
- Sir Charles Rich, 3rd Baronet (1680–1706), English naval officer
- Charles Rich (politician) (1771–1824), U.S. representative from Vermont
- Charles A. Rich (1854–1943), American architect
- Charles C. Rich (1809–1883), American leader in The Church of Jesus Christ of Latter-day Saints
- Charles W. G. Rich, United States Army general
- Charlie Rich (1932–1995), American country music musician
- Charles Rich (hurdler) (born 1951), American hurdler, 1972 and 1973 All-American for the UCLA Bruins track and field team
