= Alexander Low (British Army officer) =

British Army officer (1817–1904)

General Sir Alexander Low KCB
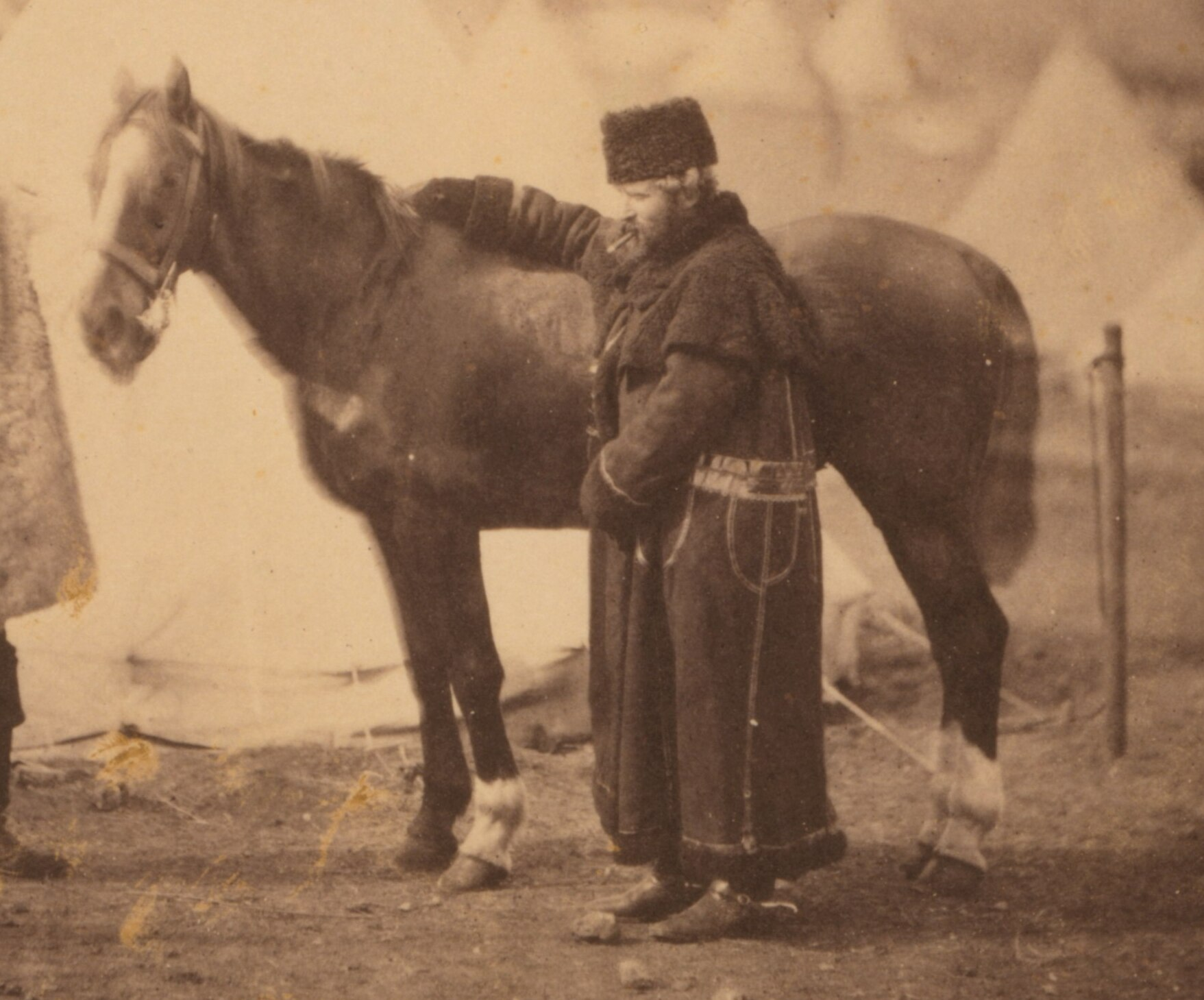
- Low in the Crimea, 1855
- Born: June 1817
- Died: 9 July 1904 (aged 87)
- Military career
- Allegiance: United Kingdom
- Branch: British Army
- Rank: General
- Conflicts: Crimean War
- Awards: Knight Commander of the Order of the Bath

General Sir Alexander Low KCB (June 1817 – 9 July 1904) was a British Army officer.

== Military career ==
Low was commissioned as a cornet in the 4th Light Dragoons in October 1835. He was present at the Battle of Alma in September 1854 and commanded a squadron of the 4th Light Dragoons during the disastrous Charge of the Light Brigade at the Battle of Balaclava in October 1854 during the Crimean War. Lieutenant Henry Adlington reported that Low exhibited during the charge:

A fine figure of a man, weighing fifteen stone - a most gallant fellow - and perhaps the best cavalry officer in the service.

Low went on to command his regiment at the Battle of Inkerman in November 1854, the Battle of Eupatoria in February 1855 and the Battle of the Chernaya in August 1855 as well as the closing stages of the Siege of Sevastopol later that year. He was promoted to major-general in 1868, lieutenant-general in 1874 and full general in 1880. He was appointed a Knight Commander of the Order of the Bath on 21 June 1904, just a few weeks before his death on 9 July 1904.

Military offices
Preceded by Sir Henry Dalrymple White	Colonel of the 2nd Dragoon Guards (Queen's Bays); 1874–1881	Succeeded by Sir Charles Walker
Preceded by William Parlby	Colonel of the 4th Queen's Own Hussars; 1881–1904	Succeeded by Sir Alexander Moore
