= William Mackworth Praed =

British politician

William Mackworth Praed (3 November 1694 – 1752), born William Mackworth, was an English lawyer and politician.

He was the third son of Sir Humphrey Mackworth MP, and brother of Herbert Mackworth. He was educated at the Middle Temple.

His change of name was the result of an arranged marriage, although the sources disagree on who his wife was. Colburn records that he married Martha, the daughter of John Praed MP, and took Praed's name on marriage. However, Cruikshanks asserts that this deal fell through, and he married Ann Slaney, the daughter of a wealthy merchant from Bristol, in a deal between Sir Humphrey Mackworth and John Praed, by which half of Ann's dowry went to redeem Praed's debt, in return for which young William Mackworth took the name of Praed and was adopted as Praed's son and heir.

In 1733 he inherited from Praed the Trevethoe estate in Cornwall, which included the patronage of the parliamentary borough of St Ives, and at the 1734 general election he returned himself as Member of Parliament for St Ives. He did not stand again in 1741.

William Mackworth Praed had one daughter and three sons:

1. Humphrey Mackworth Praed, MP for St Ives 1761–68
2. Bulkeley Mackworth Praed
3. William Mackworth Praed

Parliament of Great Britain
Preceded by Henry Knollys; Sir Robert Rich, Bt	Member of Parliament for St Ives; 1734–1741; With: Sir Robert Rich, Bt	Succeeded by Gregory Beake; John Bristow
