= Rich baronets of Shirley House (1791) =

Escutcheon of the Rich baronets of Shirley House

The Rich baronetcy, of Shirley House in the County of Southampton, was created in the Baronetage of Great Britain on 28 July 1791 for the Rev. Charles Rich, birth name Charles Bostock, and son of John Bostock, Canon of Windsor. He was the son-in-law of the 5th Baronet of the 1676 creation, inherited his estates, and assumed the name and arms of Rich in 1790. He sold the Rich family estate of Roos Hall, Beccles in 1812; the seat of the baronetcy is also given as "Rose Hall". The de facto seat was Shirley House by the time of the 1st Baronet's death there in 1824.

The title became dormant on the death of the 6th Baronet in 1983. As of 2026, the Official Roll of the Baronetage marks Rich of Rose Hall as "dormant".

== Rich baronets, of Shirley House (1791) ==
- Sir Charles Rich, 1st Baronet (c.1752–1824), rector of Luddington in 1779; and from 1783 a chaplain to Elizabeth, widow of George Lyttelton, 1st Baron Lyttelton, and daughter of Sir Robert Rich, 4th Baronet of the 1676 creation.
- Sir Charles Henry Rich, 2nd Baronet (1784–1857)
- Sir Charles Henry John Rich, 3rd Baronet (1812–1866)
- Sir Charles Henry Stuart Rich, 4th Baronet (1859–1913)
- Sir Almeric Edmund Frederic Rich, 5th Baronet (1859–1948)
- Sir Almeric Frederic Conness Rich, 6th Baronet (1897–1983)

== Notes ==
Baronetage of Great Britain
Preceded by Vaughan baronets	Rich baronets of Shirley House; 28 July 1791	Succeeded by Hudson baronets
