= Rich baronets =

Set index for Rich baronets

There have been four baronetcies created for persons with the surname Rich, two in the Baronetage of England, one in the Baronetage of Great Britain and one in the Baronetage of the United Kingdom. As of 2026 three of the creations are extinct, while one is dormant.

- Rich baronets of Sunning (1st creation, 1661)
- Rich baronets of London (1676)
- Rich baronets of Shirley House (1791)
- Rich baronets of Sunning (2nd creation, 1863): see Sir Henry Rich, 1st Baronet (1803–1869)

== See also ==
- Rich family
