= Henry Knollys (St Ives MP) =

British Politician

Henry Knollys (c 1689 – 1747), of Grove Place, Nursling, Hampshire, was a British politician who sat in the House of Commons from 1722 to 1734.

Knollys was the eldest son of Francis Knollys of Grove Place and his wife Margaret Fleming, daughter of Edward Fleming of North Stoneham, Hampshire. His father died in 1701 and he succeeded to his estate. He matriculated at Trinity College, Oxford on 17 October 1704, aged 15 and was admitted at Middle Temple in 1705. He was sent down from Oxford in 1707 for ‘being disobedient, and insulting, and very abusive to the society’ but was re-admitted the next year. He was High Sheriff of Hampshire for the year 1716 to 1717.

At the 1722 British general election, Knollys was returned as Member of Parliament for St Ives on the Powlett interest. He voted with the Administration in every recorded division. He was returned for St Ives at the 1727 British general election but did not stand in 1734.

Knollys died in early 1747, leaving one son, Thomas.

Parliament of Great Britain
Preceded by Lord Harry Powlett; Sir John Hobart	Member of Parliament for St Ives; 1722–1734; With: Sir John Hobart 1722-727; Sir Robert Rich, Bt 1727-1734	Succeeded by Sir Robert Rich, Bt; William Mackworth Praed
