= William Evans (British Army officer) =

British Army officer

Lieutenant-General William Evans
- Allegiance: Kingdom of Great Britain
- Branch: British Army
- Rank: Lieutenant-General
- Conflicts: War of the Spanish Succession

Lieutenant-General William Evans was a British Army officer who became governor of the Royal Hospital Chelsea.

== Military career ==
In 1713, during the War of the Spanish Succession, Evans was invited by the Duke of Ormonde to serve in Flanders and acquired a Regiment of Dragoons when Viscount Cobham was stripped of his regiment. The regiment became known as Evans's Dragoons.

He was promoted to lieutenant general in 1727 and in 1728 King George II and Queen Caroline inspected his regiment.

He was also governor of the Royal Hospital Chelsea from 1722 until 1740.

Military offices
Preceded by Sir Richard Temple	Colonel of the Princess Anne of Denmark's Regiment of Dragoons; 1713–1735	Succeeded by Sir Robert Rich
Preceded by The Duke of Argyll	Colonel of the Queen's Own Regiment of Horse; 1733–1740	Succeeded by The Duke of Montagu
Honorary titles
Preceded by Charles Churchill	Governor, Royal Hospital Chelsea; 1722–1740	Succeeded by Sir Robert Rich
