= Henry Heveningham =

English poet, soldier and politician (1651–1700)

Henry Heveningham (1651–1700) was an English poet, soldier and politician.

Heveningham was born on 5 January 1651, a son of Arthur Heveningham of Hockwold, Norfolk. He was educated at Pembroke College, Cambridge, and Gray's Inn.

Heveningham was satirized by Thomas Brown: "... we saw a tall thin-gutted mortal driving a wheel-barrow of pears before him, and crying in a hoarse tone, pears twenty a penny; looking him earnestly in the face, I presently knew him to be beau Heveningham." Among Heveningham's poems is "If music be the food of love" (quoting Orsino's opening line in Shakespeare's Twelfth Night) which was set to music by Henry Purcell.

Heveningham raised a troop to fight for James II against Monmouth in 1685, but in 1688 he changed sides to support William of Orange.

In 1695 and again in 1698 Heveningham was elected as MP for the rotten borough of Dunwich.

In 1684 Heveningham married Frances, daughter of William Willoughby, 6th Baron Willoughby of Parham and widow of Charles Kirkhoven, 1st Earl of Bellomont. Henry Heveningham died on 26 November 1700; Frances Heveningham died in 1714; they had no children.

Parliament of England
Preceded by John Bence; Sir Robert Rich	Member of Parliament for Dunwich; 1695–1699; With: Sir Robert Rich	Succeeded by Sir Robert Kemp; Sir Charles Blois
