= 4th Queen's Own Hussars =

British Army cavalry regiment, 1685–1958

- c. 1900 regimental cap badge for other ranks
- Active: 1685–1958
- Country: England (1685–1707); Great Britain (1707–1800); United Kingdom (1801–1958)
- Branch: English Army (1685–1707); British Army (1707–1958)
- Type: Cavalry
- Role: Light cavalry
- Size: Regiment
- Part of: Royal Armoured Corps
- Regimental Headquarters: London
- Nickname: Paget's Irregular Horse
- Mottos: Mente et Manu (With Mind and Hand)
- March: Quick: Berkeley's Dragoons; Slow: Litany of Loretto
- Anniversaries: Salamanca Day, 22 July; Balaklava Day, 25 October; St Patrick's Day, 17 March

Commanders
- Colonel-in-Chief: Sir Winston Churchill

The 4th Queen's Own Hussars was a cavalry regiment in the British Army, first raised in 1685. It saw service for three centuries, including the First World War and the Second World War. It amalgamated with the 8th King's Royal Irish Hussars, to form the Queen's Royal Irish Hussars in 1958.

== History ==
=== Formation and early history ===
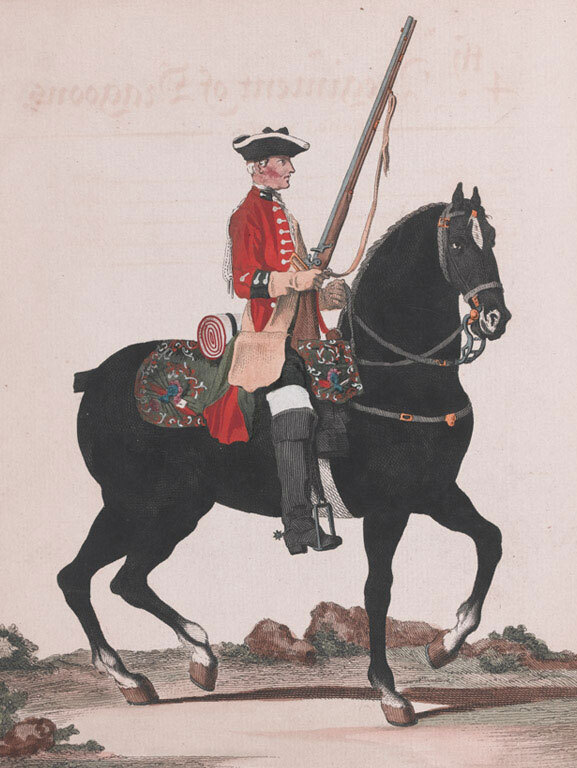
c. 1742 engraving of a regimental private

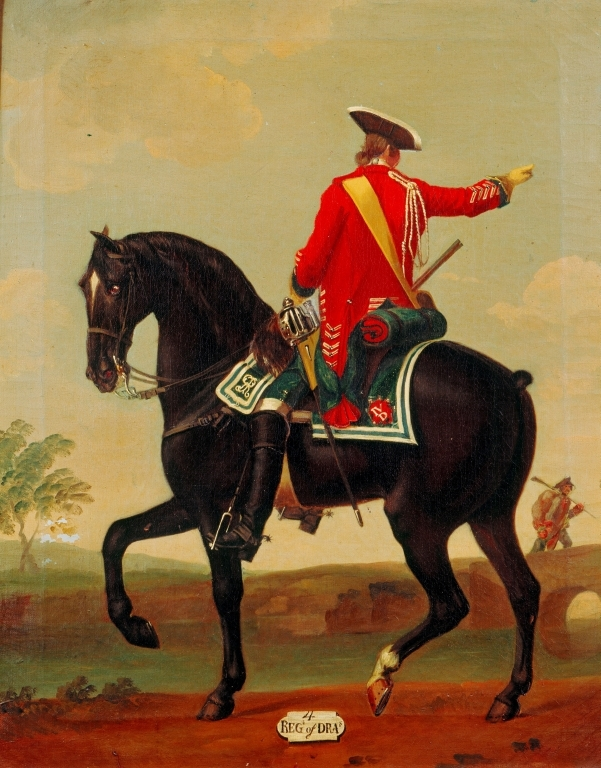
c. 1751 painting of a regimental private

The regiment was first raised by the Hon. John Berkeley as The Princess Anne of Denmark's Regiment of Dragoons in 1685, as part of the response to the Monmouth Rebellion by the regimenting of various independent troops, and ranked as the 4th Dragoons. The regiment transferred its allegiance to King William III in February 1689 and fought the depleted forces of James II in Scotland later that year. The regiment saw action at the Battle of Steenkerque, where it suffered heavy losses, in August 1692 and at the Siege of Namur in July 1695 during the Nine Years' War. The regiment suffered heavy losses again at the Battle of Almansa in April 1707 during the War of the Spanish Succession and next fought at the Battle of Sheriffmuir in November 1715 during the Jacobite rising.

During the War of the Austrian Succession, the regiment fought in the Battle of Dettingen on 27 June 1743; at the battle a regimental trooper recovered the regimental standard after it was seized by a French officer. The regiment suffered a serious reverse when it was ambushed during a series of disastrous events leading up to fall of Ghent in July 1745 and then fought bravely to mitigate the British defeat at the Battle of Lauffeld in July 1747. The regiment was formally titled as the 4th Regiment of Dragoons in 1751 and, having helped suppress the Gordon Riots in 1780, it was named for Queen Charlotte as the 4th (Queen's Own) Regiment of Dragoons in 1788.

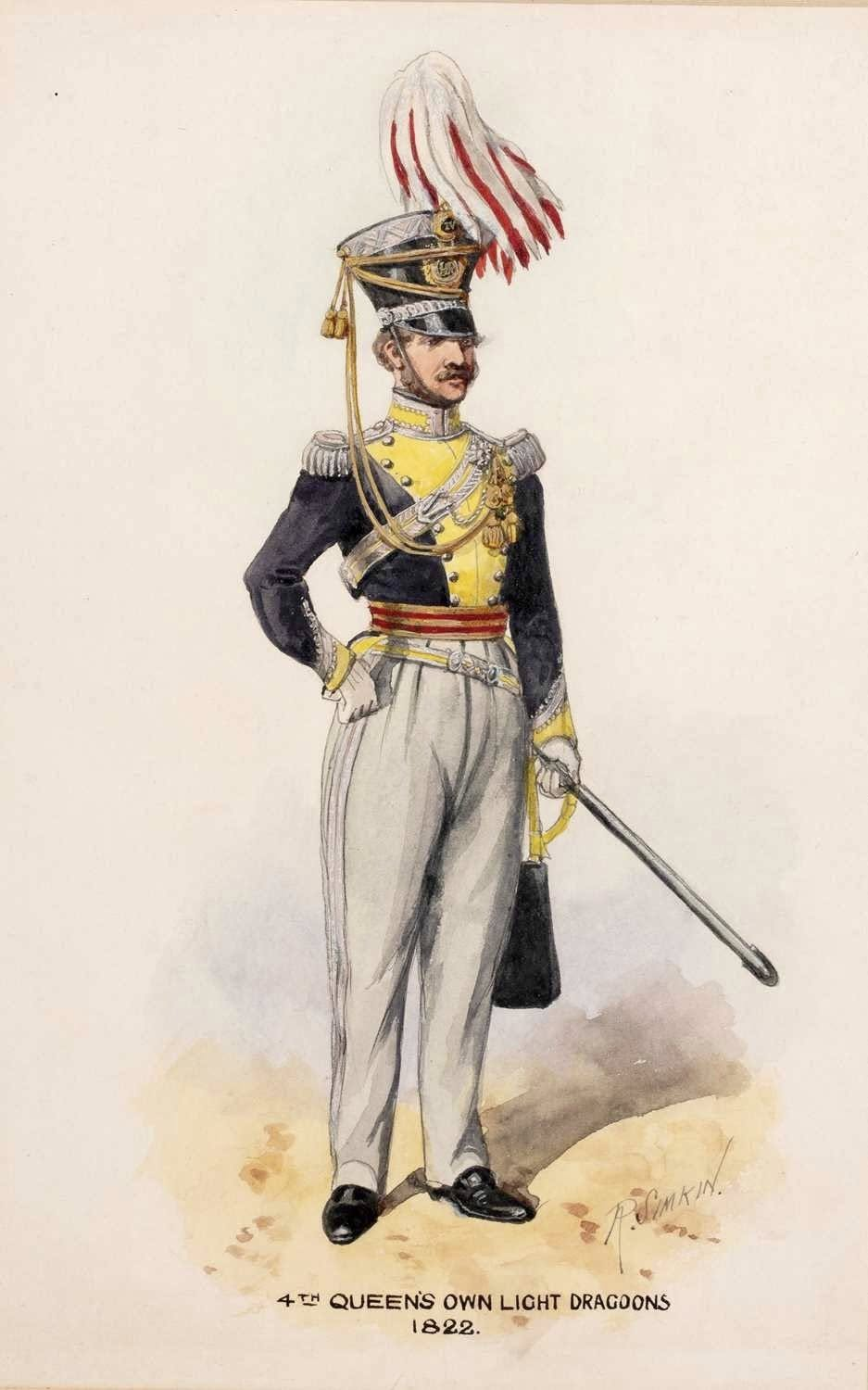
A regimental officer in 1822

The regiment fought at the Battle of Talavera in July 1809 under Sir Arthur Wellesley and then contributed to a successful ambush of the enemy at the Battle of Usagre in May 1811 during the Peninsular War. The regiment took part in a successful charge at the Battle of Salamanca in July 1812 and in the aftermath seized some of Joseph Bonaparte's silver; it then fought at the Battle of Vitoria in June 1813 and at the Battle of Toulouse in April 1814. The regiment was designated a light dragoons in 1818, becoming the 4th (The Queen's Own) Regiment of (Light) Dragoons and went to fight at the Battle of Ghazni in July 1839 during the First Anglo-Afghan War.

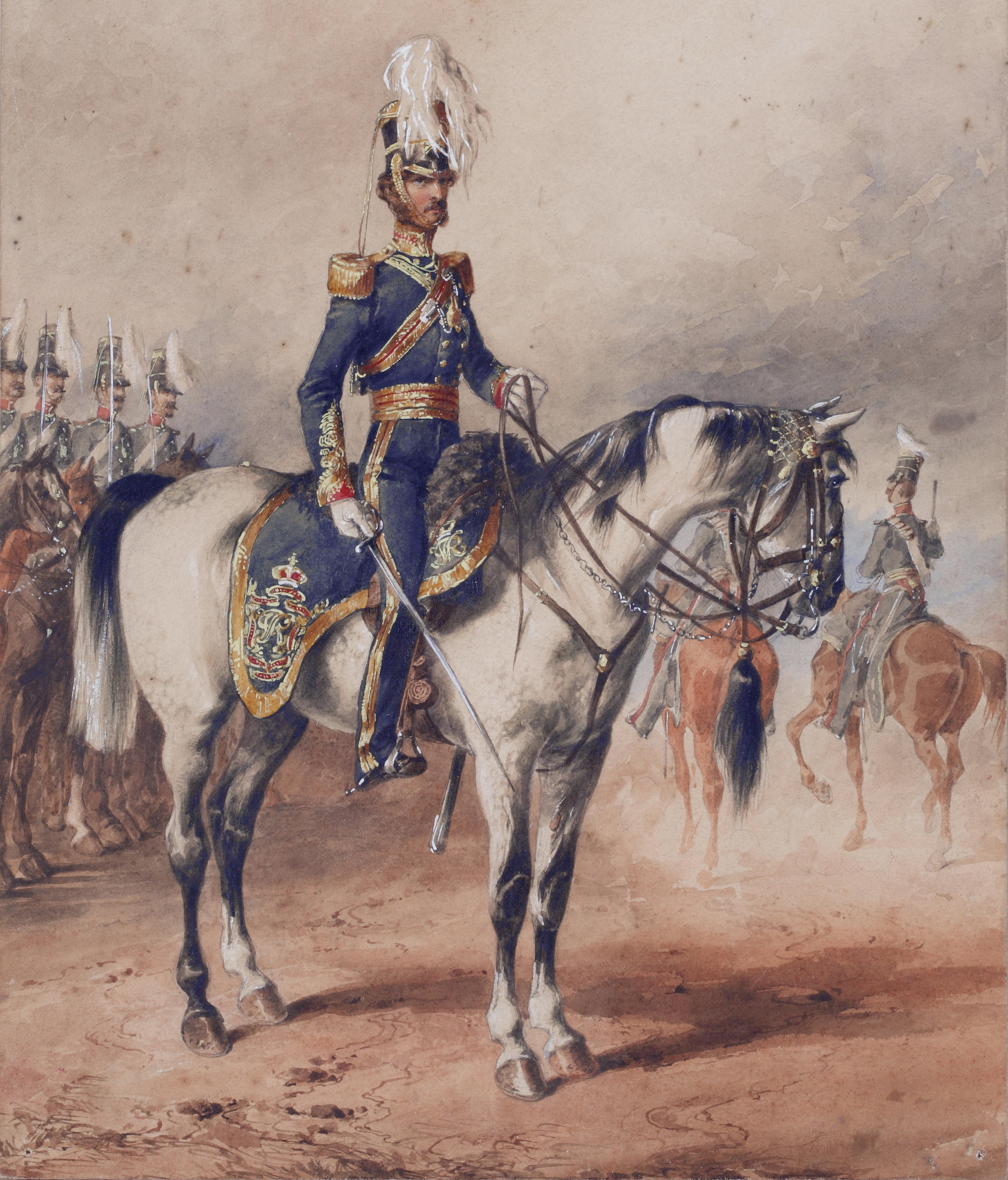
1850 painting of regimental troops

The regiment next saw action, as part of the light brigade under the command of Major General the Earl of Cardigan, at the Battle of Alma in September 1854. The regiment was in the second line of cavalry on the right flank during the Charge of the Light Brigade at the Battle of Balaclava in October 1854. The brigade drove through the Russian artillery before smashing straight into the Russian cavalry and pushing them back; it was unable to consolidate its position, however, having insufficient forces and had to withdraw to its starting position, coming under further attack as it did so. The regiment lost four officers and 55 men in the debacle. Private Samuel Parkes was awarded the Victoria Cross during the charge for saving the life of a Trumpeter, Hugh Crawford.

The regiment became the 4th (Queen's Own) Hussars in 1861. Winston Churchill was commissioned as a cornet in the 4th Hussars in February 1895.

=== First World War ===
The regiment, which was based on the Curragh at the commencement of the First World War, landed in France as part of the 3rd Cavalry Brigade in the 2nd Cavalry Division in August 1914 for service on the Western Front. The regiment took part in the Great Retreat in September 1914, the First Battle of Ypres in October 1914 and the Second Battle of Ypres in April 1915. The regiment also helped halt the German advance at the Battle of Moreuil Wood in March 1918 in a conflict that saw the regiment's commanding officer, Lieutenant-Colonel John Darley, killed in action.

=== Inter-war ===
The regiment was retitled as the 4th Queen's Own Hussars in 1921: it moved to India that year and remained there until 1931; the regiment mechanised in 1936 and was transferred to the Royal Armoured Corps in 1939.

=== Second World War ===
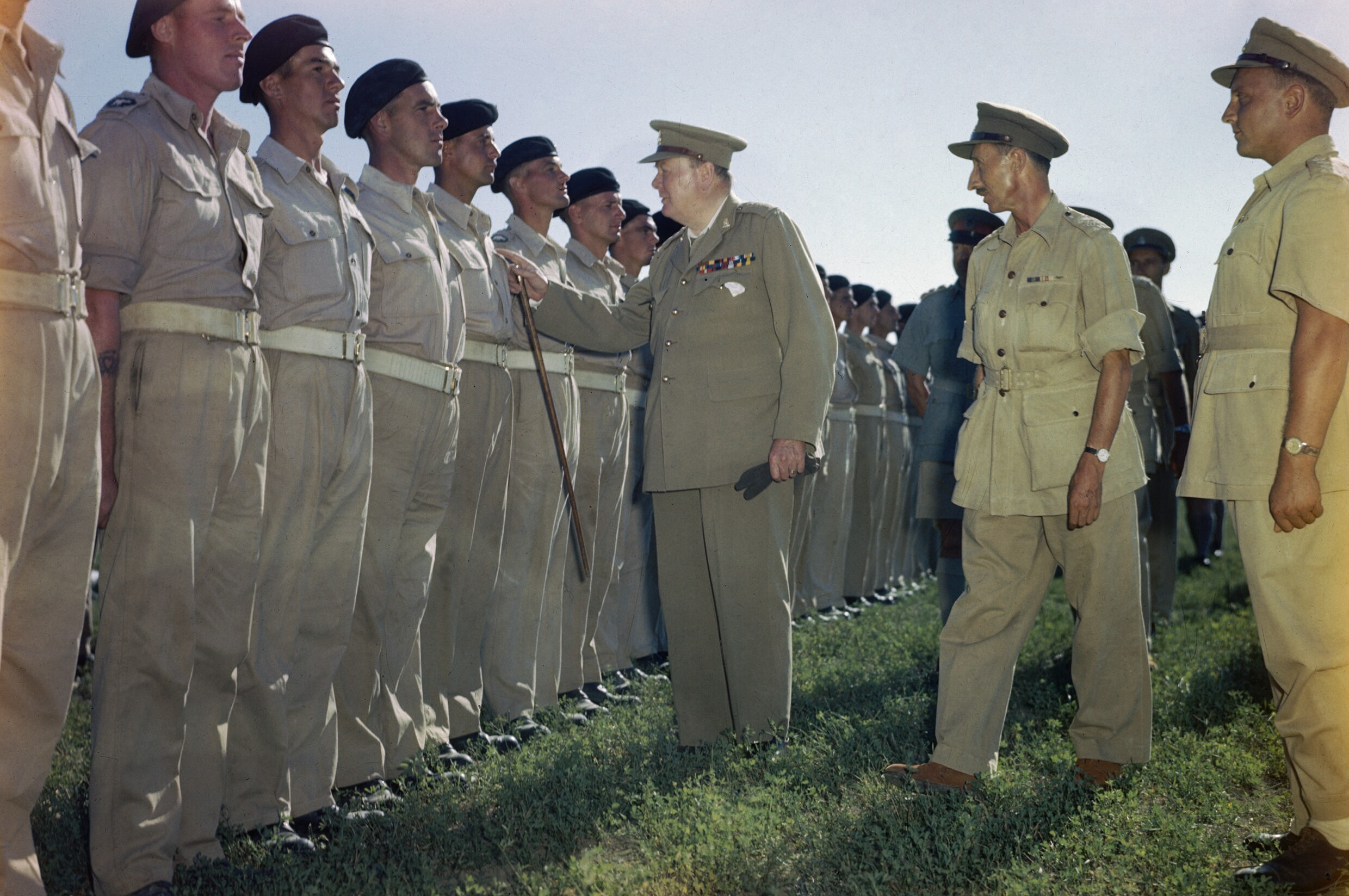
Winston Churchill inspecting the regiment at Loreto, 25 August 1944

The regiment was posted to the Middle East arriving on 31 December 1940 and as part of the 1st Armoured Brigade in the 6th Australian Infantry Division fought in the Greek Campaign. As the rearguard defending the bridge across the Corinth Canal, the regiment was overrun and surrendered en masse, losing all senior officers and over 400 men as prisoners of war. In June 1941, the regiment was reconstituted in Cairo and rejoined the 1st Armoured Brigade. Badly mauled during the Battle of Gazala in May 1942 and having lost almost an entire squadron, which had been attached to the 3rd County of London Yeomanry (Sharpshooters), in June 1942, the regiment was temporarily amalgamated with one squadron from the (similarly depleted) 8th King's Royal Irish Hussars to form the 4th/8th Hussars for the Battle of Alam el Halfa in August 1942 and the Second Battle of El Alamein in October 1942. The regiment fought with distinction in the Italian campaign during the allied advance into the Axis territories. Winston Churchill became Honorary Colonel of the Regiment in 1941 and served until amalgamation.

=== Post-war ===
After the Second World War, the 4th Hussars deployed to Lübeck in Germany in March 1947 from where the regiment was sent to serve in the Federation of Malaya in September 1948. It returned to the UK in December 1951 and was then posted to Caen Barracks in Hohne in September 1953. The regiment was slated for reduction in the 1957 Defence White Paper, and was amalgamated with the 8th King's Royal Irish Hussars, to form the Queen's Royal Irish Hussars in 1958.

== Regimental museum ==
The regimental collection is based at a new facility in Warwick known as "Trinity Mews": the museum opened in April 2022.

== Battle Honours ==
The battle honours of the regiment were as follows:

- Early Wars: Dettingen, Talavera, Albuhera, Salamanca, Vittoria, Toulouse, Peninsula, Ghuznee 1839, Afghanistan 1839, Alma, Balaklava, Inkerman, Sevastopol
- The Great War: Mons, Le Cateau, Retreat from Mons, Marne 1914, Aisne 1914, Messines 1914, Armentières 1914, Ypres 1914 '15, Langemarck 1914, Gheluvelt, St. Julien, Bellewaarde, Arras 1917, Scarpe 1917, Cambrai 1917, Somme 1918, Amiens, Hindenburg Line, Canal du Nord, Pursuit to Mons, France and Flanders 1914-18
- The Second World War: Gazala, Defence of Alamein Line, Ruweisat, Alam el Halfa, El Alamein, North Africa 1942, Coriano, San Clemente, Senio Pocket, Rimini Line, Conventello-Comacchio, Senio, Santerno Crossing, Argenta Gap, Italy 1944-45, Proasteion, Corinth Canal, Greece 1941

== Victoria Cross ==
- Private Samuel Parkes, Crimean War (25 October 1854)

== Regimental Colonels ==
The colonels of the regiment were as follows:

- 1685–1688: Brig-Gen. John Berkeley, 4th Viscount Fitzhardinge
- 1688: Col. Thomas Maxwell
- 1688–1693: Brig-Gen. John Berkeley, 4th Viscount Fitzhardinge (reappointed)
- 1693–1710: Lt-Gen. Algernon Capell, 2nd Earl of Essex
- 1710–1713: F.M. Sir Richard Temple, 1st Viscount Cobham
- 1713–1735: Gen. William Evans
- 1735–1768: F.M. Sir Robert Rich, 4th Baronet

4th Regiment of Dragoons - (1751)

- 1768–1770: F.M. Hon. Henry Seymour Conway
- 1770–1788: Gen. Benjamin Carpenter

4th (Queen's Own) Regiment of Dragoons - (1788)

- 1788–1797: F.M. John Griffin, 4th Baron Howard de Walden, KB (Lord Braybrooke)
- 1797–1802: Gen. Sir Robert Sloper, KB
- 1802–1808: Gen. Sir Guy Carleton, 1st Baron Dorchester, KB
- 1808–1836: Gen. Francis Hugonin

4th (Queen's Own) Regiment of Light Dragoons - (1818)

- 1836–1841: Gen. Lord Robert Edward Henry Somerset, GCB
- 1842–1847: Lt-Gen. Sir James Charles Dalbiac, KCH
- 1847–1861: Gen. Sir George Scovell, GCB

4th (Queen's Own) Hussars - (1861)

- 1861–1865: Gen. Sir James Hope Grant, GCB
- 1865–1874: Gen. William Lennox Lascelles Fitzgerald de Ros, 23rd Baron de Ros
- 1874–1880: Gen. Lord George Augustus Frederick Paget, KCB
- 1880–1881: Gen. William Hampton Parlby
- 1881–1904: Gen. Alexander Low, CB
- 1904–1919: Gen. Sir Alexander George Montgomery Moore, KCB
- 1919–1941: Maj-Gen. Sir Reginald Walter Ralph Barnes, KCB, DSO
- 1941–1958: Col. Sir Winston Leonard Spencer Churchill, KG, OM, CH, TD, LLD, MP

== See also ==
- British cavalry during the First World War
