= Charles Beauchamp Walker =

British Army officer

General Sir Charles Beauchamp Walker KCB
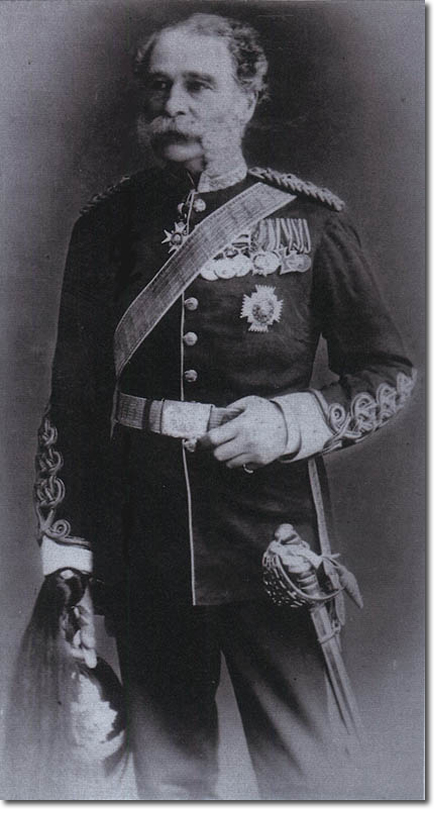
- Born: Charles Pyndar Beauchamp Walker; 7 October 1817; Redland, Bristol, England
- Died: 19 January 1894 (aged 76); Kensington, London
- Military career
- Allegiance: United Kingdom
- Branch: British Army
- Rank: General
- Conflicts: Alma, Balaclava, and Inkerman
- Awards: Knight Commander of the Order of the Bath

General Sir Charles Pyndar Beauchamp Walker, KCB (7 October 1817 – 19 January 1894) was a senior officer in the British Army.

== Military career ==
He was born in Redland, Bristol, the eldest son of industrialist and later Mayor of Bristol Charles Ludlow Walker JP. He was educated at Winchester College and commissioned as an ensign in the 33rd Foot on 27 February 1836.

He was promoted lieutenant in 1839 and captain in 1846. He served with the regiment at Gibraltar, the West Indies and North America before transferring to the 7th Dragoon Guards in 1849. In 1854 he was in the Crimea as Aide-de-Camp to Lord Lucan, commander of the cavalry division. After being present at the battles of Alma, Balaclava, and Inkerman, he was transferred aboard ship as ADC to Lord George Paulet and was present aboard HMS Bellerophon for the naval attack on Sebastopol. He was awarded the Crimea Medal with four clasps, the Turkish medal, and the Order of the Medjidie (fifth class).

In 1854, he was promoted major and left the Crimea the following year to serve as Assistant Quartermaster-General (AQMG) in Ireland as a lieutenant-colonel. In 1858 he joined the 2nd Dragoon Guards to help put down the Indian Mutiny, commanding a field force in Oudh which successfully engaged the rebels at Bangaon and seeing action at the Jirwah Pass under Sir James Hope Grant.

In 1860, he was posted to China as AQMG of cavalry in Sir Hope Grant's expedition and was present at the actions of Sinho, Chankiawan, and Palikao, narrowly escaping death in an ambush when reconnoitring for a campsite outside Peking. He became a colonel in the army the same year.

He returned home in 1861 to be AQMG at Shorncliffe Army Camp but in 1865 was appointed military attache to the embassy at Berlin, a post he held until 1876. During the Austro-Prussian war of 1866 and the Franco-German war of 1870-1 he acted as British military commissioner to the Crown Prince of Prussia's army and was present at the battles of Weissenburg, Wörth, Sedan and the Siege of Paris. He was promoted major-general in 1873 and lieutenant-general in 1877.

He left the post in Berlin to be Inspector-General of military education until 1884, when he retired with the honorary rank of full general. He was awarded KCB in 1881 and later that year given the colonelcy of the 2nd Dragoon Guards, a position he held until his death.

He died in London on 19 Jan 1894, and was buried in Brompton Cemetery. He had married Georgiana, daughter of Captain Richard Armstrong of the 100th Foot. Extracts from his letters and journals during active service were published after his death under the title "Days of a Soldier's Life".

Military offices
Preceded by Alexander Low	Colonel of the 2nd Dragoon Guards (Queen's Bays); 1881–1894	Succeeded by Sir William Henry Seymour
