= Albion Fairs =

Albion Fairs was the general name for the second wave of East Anglian Fairs, running from 1978 until 1982. There were further fairs in the same tradition most years until the end of the 1980s.

The East Anglian Fairs began with the Barsham Medieval Faire in 1972, and developed into a significant feature of rural counterculture in Britain, drawing on aspects of pop festival culture, the reinvention of traditional rural or nomadic seasonal gatherings, and a back-to-the-land early green ethos. The voluntary organisers worked under the name of the East Anglian Arts Trust (EAAT). Barsham Faire ran annually on the August Bank Holiday until 1976. In 1976, EAAT revived the Bungay May Horse Fair, which was also held in 1977. An ad hoc group of fair organisers and crew participated in the Eye Show in August 1977. This led to the formation, in the winter of 1977/1978, of Albion Fairs.

Many London and East Anglian bands and theatre groups played at these fairs, among them The Papers, who released a live album (live at Thornham Magna) in 1981, capturing the atmosphere of the fairs. They played as the headline act at Barsham, Cromer and many other events, as well as being well known on the London clubs circuit. Three singles were released in the 1980s and in 2016 the band reformed, releasing a third album and five further singles.

Some events used the spelling Fayre or Faire.

In the 1990s and 2000s, a fairly vibrant if not quite as accessible successor to the Fairs in the region was organised as the mostly biennial gatherings of Dance Camp East.

== Bibliography ==
- Richard Barnes (1982) Sun in the East: Norfolk and Suffolk Fairs. Kirstead, Norfolk: RB Photographic. ISBN 978-0-9508701-0-6.
- George McKay (1996) Senseless Acts of Beauty: Cultures of Resistance since the Sixties, chapter one 'The free festivals and Fairs of Albion'. London: Verso. ISBN 978-1-85984-028-3.
- Gill Seyfang et al., eds. (2005) The Rising Sun: Celebrating Dance Camp East. Norwich: Dance Camp East. ISBN 978-0-9550236-0-6.
