= Sir Robert Rich, 2nd Baronet =

English Whig politician

Sir Robert Rich, 2nd Baronet (c. 1648 – 1 October 1699) was an English Whig politician.

Rich was the second son of Nathaniel Rich of Stondon and his wife Elizabeth Hampden, married his distant cousin, Mary Rich, daughter of Sir Charles Rich, 1st baronet (grandson of Robert Rich, 2nd Baron Rich), and inherited in 1677 her father's baronetcy by special remainder. By Mary, he had four sons and several daughters. His sons were Charles, Robert, Nathaniel, and Cholmondeley, of whom the first two inherited his baronetcy in succession.

Rich was a Whig Member of Parliament for Dunwich and a Lord of the Admiralty during the reign of William III. He was active in speaking on naval affairs in the House.

On 5 May 1692, he was appointed Vice-Admiral of Suffolk, an office he held until a few days before his death, when he was replaced by his eldest son Charles.

Parliament of England
Preceded by Roger North; Thomas Knyvett	Member of Parliament for Dunwich; 1689–1699; With: Sir Philip Skippon 1689–91; John Bence 1691–95; Henry Heveningham 1695–99	Succeeded by Henry Heveningham; Sir Charles Blois
Honorary titles
Preceded by Sir Thomas Allin	Vice-Admiral of Suffolk; 1692–1699	Succeeded by Charles Rich
Baronetage of England
Preceded by Charles Rich	Baronet (of London); 1677–1699	Succeeded by Charles Rich
