= Rich baronets of Sunning (1st creation, 1661) =

Escutcheon of the Rich baronets of Sunning

The Rich baronetcy, of Sunning in the County of Berkshire, was created in the Baronetage of England on 20 March 1660 for Thomas Rich, a Turkey Merchant of London who also represented Reading in the House of Commons.

The 2nd Baronet was Member of Parliament for Reading and Gloucester. The title became extinct on the death of the 5th Baronet in 1803.

== Rich baronets, of Sunning (1661) ==
- Sir Thomas Rich, 1st Baronet (c.1601–1667)
- Sir William Rich, 2nd Baronet (c.1654–1711)
- Sir Robert Rich, 3rd Baronet (1673–1724)
- Sir William Rich, 4th Baronet (c.1702–1762)
- Sir Thomas Rich, 5th Baronet (c.1733–1803)
