= List of vice-admirals of Suffolk =

This is a list of people who have served as Vice-Admiral of Suffolk. Prior to 1594 the office holder was also Vice-Admiral of Norfolk.

- Sir William Gonson 1536–1544
- Sir William Woodhouse 1554–1564 jointly with
- Sir Thomas Woodhouse 1554–1572 and
- Henry Woodhouse 1563–1579
- William Heydon 1579–? jointly with
- Christopher Heydon 1579–?
- Sir Robert Southwell 1585–1594
- Sir Michael Stanhope 1595 – 1621/22 jointly with
- Sir Lionel Tollemache, 2nd Baronet bef. 1619 – 1640
- Sir William Playters, 2nd Baronet 1640–1649
- Sir Henry Mildmay 1644–1650 (Parliamentary)
- William Heveningham 1650–1656
- English Interregnum
- Sir Henry Felton, 2nd Baronet 1660–1683
- Sir Thomas Allin, 2nd Baronet 1683–1692
- Sir Robert Rich, 2nd Baronet 1692–1699
- Sir Charles Rich, 3rd Baronet 1699–1702
- Lionel Tollemache, 3rd Earl of Dysart 1702–1705
- Charles FitzRoy, 2nd Duke of Grafton 1705–1757
- vacant
- Francis Ingram-Seymour-Conway, 2nd Marquess of Hertford 1822
- Francis Seymour-Conway, 3rd Marquess of Hertford 1822–1842
- vacant
- John Rous, 2nd Earl of Stradbroke 1844–1886
- vacant
- George Rous, 3rd Earl of Stradbroke 1890–1947
