= Sir Charles Rich, 3rd Baronet =

Captain Sir Charles Rich Bt
- Born: 1680
- Died: 17 October 1706 (aged 25–26)
- Burial place: St Margaret's Church, Westminster
- Military career
- Allegiance: England
- Branch: Royal Navy
- Rank: Post Captain
- Commands: HMS Hunter; HMS Feversham
- Conflicts: Battle of Vigo Bay

Sir Charles Rich, 3rd Baronet (1680 – 17 October 1706) was an officer in the Royal Navy during the War of the Spanish Succession.

Born in 1680, the eldest of four sons of the politician and Lord of the Admiralty Sir Robert Rich, 2nd Baronet, Charles Rich embarked on a naval career. He was commissioned a lieutenant on 9 January 1697 and appointed as second lieutenant of the 60-gun HMS Gloucester. His commission was confirmed by the Admiralty on 24 March 1697 and on 14 April 1697 he joined the 100-gun HMS Queen as her fifth lieutenant. From the Queen he transferred into the 50-gun HMS Weymouth on 25 November 1697 as her first lieutenant, and then the 32-gun HMS Winchelsey on 23 March 1698. On 17 July 1699 Rich was appointed first lieutenant of the 48-gun HMS Advice. On 25 September 1699, he succeeded his father as Vice-Admiral of Suffolk, several days before his father's death on 1 October 1699. As his father's heir, Charles succeeded to the family baronetcy as third baronet, of London, but continued his naval career.

On 28 February 1701 Rich was appointed second lieutenant of the 64-gun HMS Swiftsure, transferring to the 70-gun HMS Lenox, again as second lieutenant, on 1 December 1701. On 19 January 1702 Rich was promoted to commander and given command of the 28-gun HMS Hunter. He captained her for the following year, during which time he relinquished his position as Vice-Admiral of Suffolk to Lionel Tollemache, 3rd Earl of Dysart on 8 July 1702, and saw action against the French and Spanish at the Battle of Vigo Bay on 12 October 1702 as part of an allied Anglo-Dutch fleet under Admirals George Rooke and Philips van Almonde. Promoted to post captain, Rich took command of the 32-gun HMS Feversham on 19 January 1703, remaining in command until 17 October that year. Sir Charles died on 17 October 1706 at the age of 26, and was buried on 19 October 1706 in St Margaret's Church, Westminster. The burial register noted that he was "of Beccles in Suffolk", and was "Captain of the Feversham man of war". No gravestone or memorial has survived. This entry notwithstanding, John Charnock recorded in his Biographia Navalis that according to a "private M.S. memorandum, which we believe authentic" that Rich was captain of the 32-gun HMS Falcon at the time of his death. As he died without issue, the baronetcy descended to his younger brother Robert, a distinguished army officer.

Honorary titles
Preceded by Sir Robert Rich, Bt	Vice-Admiral of Suffolk; 1699–1702	Succeeded by The Earl of Dysart
Baronetage of England
Preceded by Robert Rich	Baronet (of London); 1699–1706	Succeeded by Robert Rich
