= William Hampton Parlby =

British Army general

General William Hampton Parlby
- Born: William Hampton Parlby; 1801; Bengal Presidency, British India
- Died: 26 October 1881 (aged 79–80); Hubberston, Pembrokeshire, Wales
- Military career
- Allegiance: United Kingdom
- Branch: British Army
- Service years: 1816–1881
- Rank: General
- Unit: 4th (Queen's Own) Light Dragoons
- Commands: 10th Hussars; Cavalry formations in the Crimea; Curragh Cavalry Brigade
- Conflicts: Crimean War
- Awards: British Crimea Medal; Sardinian Crimea Medal; Turkish Crimea Medal; 4th Class Order of the Medjidie

General William Hampton Parlby was a senior British Army officer, who served in British cavalry regiments in India and the Crimean War.

== Family background ==
William Parlby was born in India in what was known as the Bengal Presidency in 1801; his parents were Colonel James Templer Parlby, an engineer in the East India Company originally from Plymouth, and Louisa Munt from London). He was one of five siblings, four of which survived childhood. His grandfather was Thomas Parlby a master mason and architect from Plymouth.

William's mother Louisa was a collector of locally commissioned pictures of scenes of colonial and local life around their residence in India, i.e. the cantonment at Maidapur (near the administrative centre of Berhampore, West Bengal).

William Parlby died a bachelor in Hubberston, near Milford Haven, Pembrokeshire on 26 October 1881, none of his relatives were named in the will and probate record.

== Military career ==
William Parlby was commissioned as a cornet in the 4th (Queen's Own) Light Dragoons on 3 October 1816; he was promoted to lieutenant on 17 May 1824 and then to captain on 28 September 1826. He is recorded as being a brevet major in 1841 and in 1845. In 1843 he commanded a detachment of his regiment in Wales during the Rebecca Riots. He was promoted to lieutenant colonel in the 4th Light Dragoons on 30 January 1846 (by purchase), although he only commanded the regiment for seven months.

In terms of his overseas and campaign service, William Parlby served with his regiment in India and then as a colonel he commanded other regiments in India e.g. the 10th (The Prince of Wale's Own) Royal Regiment of Light Dragoons (Hussars) based in Kirkee, India. In 1854 after the disastrous Charge of the Light Brigade he was ordered to bring his regiment (then the 10th Hussars) from India to the Crimea (via Egypt), the 680 strong regiment arrived on 15 April 1855 to join Allied troops laying siege to the city of Sebastopol. During the latter stages of the Crimea War he commanded the British Cavalry Division from 17 April to 30 June 1855 and then the Cavalry Division's Hussar Brigade from 1 July to 2 September 1855. He was also present with Turkish forces at the Battle of the Chernaya. He was thoroughly involved in cavalry operations around Sevastopol and Lord Raglan complimented him in despatches. He was awarded the Crimea Medal with Clasp for Sebastopol, the Sardinian and Turkish Crimea Medals and 4th Class Order of the Medjidie.

On home service as a major general he commanded the Cavalry Brigade of the Dublin Division in Ireland, based at Curragh Camp (1860–1861).

He was promoted to major general in 1860, then lieutenant general on 21 March 1869 and then promoted to general on 22 May 1876.

General Parlby would become the Regimental Colonel of the 21st Regiment of Hussars on 24 October 1865; until on 1 July 1880 he was appointed as Colonel of his old regiment (the 4th (Queens Own) Hussars) a post he was still holding in 1881 when he died (albeit an honorary post).
