= Thomas Spinelly =

English diplomat

Sir Thomas Spinelly was Henry VIII of England’s representative in the Low Countries in 1510 and to Spain in 1517–8.
