= Roos Hall =

Manor house in Suffolk, UK

Coordinates: 52.455°N 1.553°E

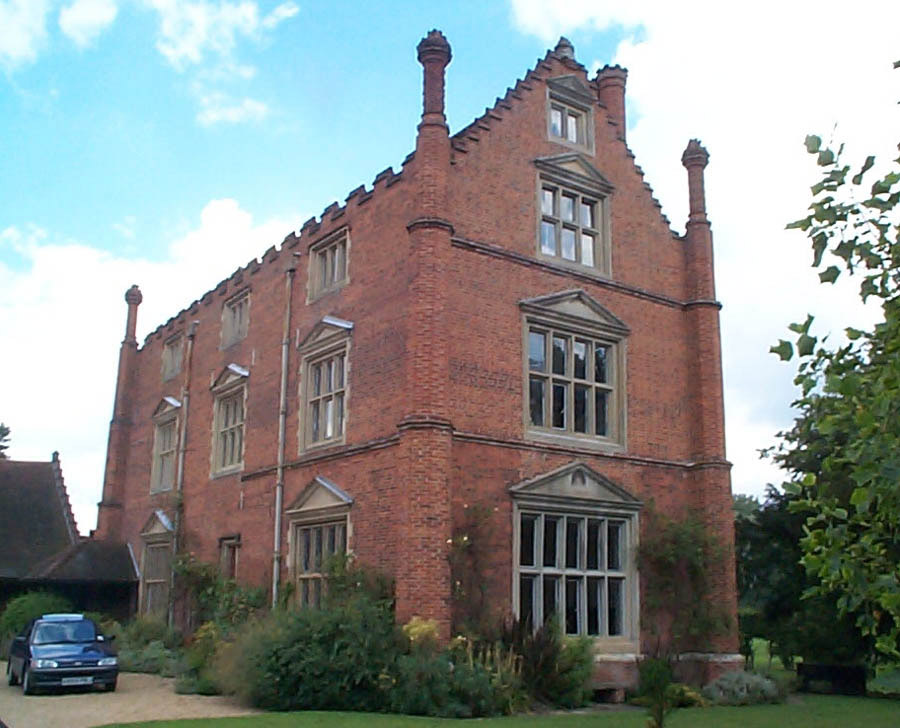
Roos Hall, near Beccles

Roos Hall (or sometimes Rose Hall) is a manor house and former manor ½ a mile (¾km) west of Beccles in Suffolk. It is a Grade I listed building.

It is said to be among the most haunted houses in England, and to have the Devil's footprint imprinted on one of its walls.

It was owned by the Suckling family in the 17th century having been bought by Sir John Suckling in 1600. On Suckling's death, Roos Hall was subject to a £6,000 mortgage, which, according to Sir John's Will, had to be repaid by his executors within a year of his death, or it would revert to the "Feoffes" from whom he borrowed the money.

"Whereas I have mortgaged my mannerr of Roeshall in Suffolk to certain Feoffees to the vse of my verie lovinge wief, for the payment of six thousand poundes within one yeare after my decease: Nowe for that I know that my executors cannott possiblie paie the same within the time mentioned, I am content to leave that Manor wholie to the said Feoffes for her behalf, And would have my Executors give her the Writings concerning the same, unless she shalbe pleased, out of her noble and cood nature to give my eldedst sonne such time for th payment as he mai be able to compasse the same without harzarding the ruine of his estate. I give to my wief all her Apparell, Pearles, RInges and Jewelles, save onlie one chaine of dymonds which I lately bought of one Mr Hardnett, a Jeweller for £155, which is by her to be repaid to my executors, vnless my eldest sonne and she agree about the Redemption of the Manor in Rosehall"

According to Walter Copinger, in The Manors of Suffolk, the funds could not be raised in time and the property fell into the hands of Sir Alexander Temple (the Brother-in-Law of Sir John's Widow, Jane, by way of marriage to her Sister, Mary), who left it to his executors to repay his debts on his death in 1629:

"...and that Now Jane, Sir John Suckling's widow, whom he married when himself a widower, 2nd March, 1616, was the daughter of John Reve, of Bury, and widow of Charles Hawkins. She was the sister of Mary Reve, who had married three times — ist John Bushbridge, of Echingham, Sussex; 2ndly Robert Bankworth, son of John Temple, by Susan Spencer, of Everton. No doubt the mortgagee of Sir John Suckling was this Sir Alexander Temple, and though it is not clear whether the £6,000 had been actually raised and paid to, or for the benefit of, Jane, or whether she had only a charge to this amount by way of settlement, one must almost imply the former, and that Jane when a widow, and at least for two months after her marriage to Sir Edwin Rich, which was on the I4th Sept. 1629, declined or failed to redeem. This may be inferred from the will of Sir Alexander Temple, of Stow, co. Bucks, dated 2ist Nov. 1629, wherein is the following gift : ' I ordaine my loving cousin, Graven Saunders and Robert Airbery merchant and Henry W alley agent my sole executors. First. I give the manor of Rosehall and Ashmans in the County of Suffolk unto them to sell at their pleasure and also all my land in Essex, and all the lands I have in this kingdom, first to pay all such debts as my son James Temple stands engaged for me and then to discharge themselves. The rest to remain to my son James and his heirs for ever.'"

This makes more sense than Sir Alexander Temple (Suckling's brother-in-law) simply "inheriting" it in lieu of repayment of a debt, because Sir John's Widow in fact outlived her Brother-in-Law, who died in 1629 (see above), while she lived until November 1662.

The property is said to have later been repurchased by the Suckling family and subsequently passed to the Rich family following the marriage between Sir John Suckling's widow, Jane and Sir Edwin Rich, in September 1629 and Jane's subsequent death in 1662. because Sir Edwin was in possession of the manor at the time of his death in 1675. It was then sold in 1805 by Sir Charles Rich and his Wife, Mary Frances, to Thomas Rede, esq. of Beccles for £12,160.
