= Francis Williams (alias Cromwell) =

English politician (c. 1541–1598)

The Honourable Francis Williams alias Cromwell

Member of Parliament for Huntingdonshire
- In office 1572–1583
- Preceded by: Richard Dorrington
- Succeeded by: John Dorrington

Personal details
- Born: c. 1541
- Died: 5 August 1598 (aged 56–57) Hardwick, Cambridgeshire, England
- Resting place: St Mary's Church, Hardwick; 52.2086°N 0.006923°E
- Spouse: Margaret Mannock
- Children: Henry Williams alias Cromwell
- Parents: Sir Richard Williams; Frances Murfyn

Francis Williams (c. 1541 – 5 August 1598), also known as Francis Cromwell, of Huntingdonshire, was an English landowner and politician. He was elected MP for Huntingdonshire in 1572 and was appointed Sheriff of Cambridgeshire and Huntingdonshire in 1587.

== Early life ==
Francis Williams, alias Cromwell, was the second son of Sir Richard Williams alias Cromwell (c. 1510–1544) of London, Stepney and Hinchingbrooke and Frances Murfyn (c. 1520–c. 1543), daughter of Thomas Murfyn and his second wife, Elizabeth Donne.

Williams, alias Cromwell was admitted to Gray's Inn in 1565.

His estates, which were mainly in Huntingdonshire, included the site of St Neots Priory, the manors of St Neots, Hardwick, and Grafham, as well as lands in the parish of Wintringham. He also owned property in Aldermanbury, London.

== Career ==
Fairly active in local affairs, he played a role subordinate to that of his elder brother, Sir Henry Williams, alias Cromwell. He served as JP, Court of quarter sessions in Huntingdonshire from 1582 and was Sheriff of Cambridgeshire and Huntingdonshire from 1587 to 1588.

With his brother's support, as sheriff, he was returned as junior knight of the shire for Huntingdonshire in 1572. He stood again in 1584, but then the sheriff was Sir Henry Darcy, a fierce opponent of his brother, who ensured that Francis was defeated and his own candidate, John Dorrington, was elected. He complained to the House of Commons, who appointed the Recorder of London and the solicitor-general to investigate the matter, but it was decided that the dispute lay outside its jurisdiction. Subsequently, the attorney-general took up his case in the Star Chamber. No further evidence survives, but Dorrington retained his seat.

== Marriage and issue ==
Francis Williams, alias Cromwell married, by 1565, Margaret Mannock, daughter of Henry Mannock of Hemingford Grey, by whom he had a son:

- Henry Williams, alias Cromwell (b. 1565)

He was estranged from his wife by 1586 when he provided her with an annuity.

== Death ==
He died at Hardwick, Cambridgeshire on 5 August 1598 and was (presumably) buried at the parish church at Hardwick. His heir, Henry, then 33 years of age, inherited the site of St Neots Priory, called the Fermerne; the manor of St Neots, with 80 acres of pasture, called Little and Great-Dirty Wintringham; the manor of Grafham, and the manor of Hardwick.
