= Sir John Austen, 2nd Baronet =

English landowner and politician

Sir John Austen, 2nd Baronet (c. 1640 – 1699) was an English landowner and politician who sat in the House of Commons at various times between 1667 and 1699.

Austen was the son of Sir Robert Austen, 1st Baronet of Hall Place, Bexley and his wife Anne Mun, daughter of Thomas Mun, and was born around 1640. He was admitted to Gray's Inn on 23 October 1657. He succeeded to the baronetcy on the death of his father on 30 October 1666. He had acquired the estate of Stagenhoe, Hertfordshire though his marriage as well as inheriting Hall Place, Bexley. In 1667, he was elected Member of Parliament for Rye in a by-election to the Cavalier Parliament. He was elected MP for Rye again in 1689, 1690, 1695 and 1698. He was one of the Commissioners of the Customs from 1697 to 1698.

Austen died in Red Lion Square, London, on 5 January 1699.

Austen married by licence dated 6 December 1661, Rose Hale, daughter of John Hale, of Stagenhoe. She died in May or November 1695, and was buried at Stagenhoe.

Parliament of England
Preceded by Herbert Morley; Sir John Robinson, 1st Bt	Member of Parliament for Rye; 1667–1679; With: Sir John Robinson, 1st Bt	Succeeded by Thomas Frewen; Sir John Robinson, 1st Bt
Preceded by Thomas Frewen; Sir John Darrel	Member of Parliament for Rye; 1667; With: Sir John Darrel; Thomas Frewen; Joseph Offley	Succeeded by Sir Robert Austen, 3rd Baronet; Joseph Offley
Baronetage of England
Preceded by Robert Austen	Baronet (of Bexley); 1641–1699	Succeeded by Robert Austen
