= Gabriel Donne =

English Cistercian abbot (died 1558)

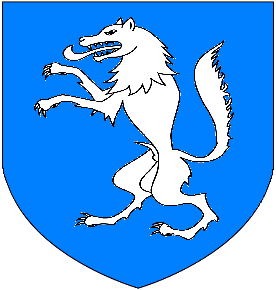
Arms of Donne: Azure, a wolf rampant argent, with addition of a chief argent, as borne by Gabriel Donne.

Gabriel Donne or Dunne (c. 1490 – 5 December 1558) was an English Cistercian monk and was the last Abbot of Buckfast Abbey in Devon, before the Dissolution of the Monasteries.

== Origins ==
He was a son of Sir Angel Donne (d.1505/6), an Alderman of the City of London, resident in 1506 in Bassishaw ward. His London house was notable for a belvedere tower of brick, which was mentioned by Stow in his Survey of London (1598). His will was dated 21 October 1505, in which he describes himself as a Citizen of London, a Grocer and a merchant of the Staple of Calais. He desired to be buried in "Our Lady Chapel, St. Margaret Patens, London" and left 200 marks to found a chapel for St. John in the churchyard, whence his body was to be removed. He bequeathed his wife "Anne Dune" one-third of his estate, as was usual for widows, and an additional £100 and household stuff. He gave another third to his minor children Edward, Francis and Elizabeth. The two sons were given an additional £100. Later on in his will he left his son Gabriell £10 to be used to school him at Cambridge or Oxford." Probate was granted on 9 December 1506.

Donne is said by some sources to be descended from the family anciently called "Downe", seated at the manor of "Doune Raph" or "Downe-Ralph", etc. later called "Rowsedown", today called Rousdon near Axminster in Devon. However the arms used by the family of "Doune of Doune Raph" given by the Devon historian Pole (d.1635) are: Paly of six argent and azure on a fesse gules three mullets or, not the same as the Wolf arms of Gabriel Donne visible on the roof of Trinity Hall, Cambridge.

== Career ==
He was admitted a member of St Bernard's College, Oxford, a house for student monks of his order, and proceeded M.A. He afterwards entered the Cistercian house of Stratford Langthorne, Essex. On 26 October 1521 he presented himself before his university as a supplicant for the degree of B.D., but was apparently not admitted.

In 1524 his sister, Elizabeth, widow of Thomas Murfyn (d. 1523), married Sir Thomas Dennis, whose stepdaughter, Donne's niece Frances Murfyn, married, by March 1534, Thomas Cromwell's nephew, Richard. Donne was a student, pretended or real, at Leuven in 1535, he went to Antwerp in the disguise of a servant to Henry Phillips, and there planned with the latter the arrest of William Tyndale, which took place in the city on 23 or 24 May in the same year. He assisted in preparing the case against Tyndale. On his return to England he obtained by the influence of Cromwell, then secretary of state, the abbacy of the house of his order at Buckfastleigh in his native Devon, at that time in the patronage of Vesey, bishop of Exeter, a bitter persecutor of the reformers. He appeared as abbot of that house in the convocation of June 1536, and subscribed the articles then agreed upon. Within two years of his election he alienated much of the monastic property, and on 25 Feb 1538–9, despite the solemn oaths he had taken, he, with nine others of his religious, surrendered his abbey into the hands of Henry VIII. On the following 26 April he was rewarded with the large pension of £120, which he enjoyed till his death. The site of the abbey was granted by the king to his brother-in-law, Sir Thomas Dennis, of Holcombe Burnell in the same county. Donne became prebendary of Mapesbury in St. Paul's Cathedral on 16 March 1540-1 and was instituted to the sinecure rectory of Stepney, Middlesex, 25 October 1544. On the deprivation of Bonner, Bishop of London, in September 1549, Donne, then one of the canons residentiary of St. Paul's Cathedral, was appointed by Archbishop Cranmer to be his official and keeper of the spiritualities, to exercise all manner of episcopal jurisdiction in the City and Diocese of London, which office he continued to fill until Ridley became bishop in April 1550. In making such an appointment Cranmer was probably acting to his own advantage, for he had all along been kept well informed of the part Donne had taken in the betrayal of Tyndale (see letter of Thomas Tebolde to the archbishop, dated 31 July 1535, in 'Letters and Papers of the Reign of Henry VIII,' Cal. State Papers, viii. 1151).

== Death and burial ==
Donne died on 5 December 1558 and was buried three days later in St. Paul's Cathedral, near the high altar.

== Bequests ==
His will, dated 5 February 1557–8, with a codicil dated 5 December 1558, was proved on 14 December 1558. He owned the advowson of Grantham Church, Lincolnshire. He gave 'to the late Barnard Colledge in Oxforde soche nomber of my bookes as myne executors shall thinke god.' 'The residue of my goodds and chattells (yf any shalbe) I require myne executors to bestowe at theire discretions to the advauncemente of poore maidens marriages, releef of scolleres and students, specially to soche as myne executors shall thinke metest as shal be towarde lerninge disposed to be preestes and ministers of Christis Churche.' One of his executors was Henry Harvey, LL.D., precentor of St. Paul's (1554), and afterwards master of Trinity Hall, Cambridge (1559).

=== Donne Scholarship, Trinity Hall ===
At his instance £120 was received under this bequest by Trinity Hall, Cambridge, which was applied to the foundation of a scholarship and feast. The "Gabriel Downe Scholarship" still exists, and his arms, Azure, a wolf rampant argent a chief of the last, are visible as one of 15 oval escutcheons of various benefactors of the college on the coffered ceiling of Trinity Hall Chapel. The arms of Sir John Donne (died 1503), a Welsh courtier, diplomat and soldier, a notable figure of the Yorkist party, were Azure, a wolf rampant argent, as visible on the Donne Triptych (c.1470) by Hans Memling in the National Gallery, London.

== Sources ==
- Beaven, Alfred B. (1913). The Aldermen of the City of London. Vol. 2. London: Corporation of the City of London.
- Berry, William (1828). Encyclopaedia Heraldica or Complete Dictionary of Heraldry. Vol. 2. London: Sherwood, Gilbert and Piper.
- Gilbert, Richard (1829). Liber Scholasticus: Or, An Account of the Fellowships, Scholarships, and Exhibitions, at the Universities of Oxford and Cambridge; by Whom Founded and Whether Open to Natives of England and Wales, Or Restricted to Particular Places and Persons : Also, of Such Colleges, Public Schools, Endowed Grammar Schools, Chartered Companies of the City of London, Corporate Bodies, Trustees, &c. as Have University Advantages Attached to Them Or in Their Patronage. London: C.J.G. & F. Rivington.
- Goodwin, Gordon (1888). "Donne, Gabriel" . In Stephen, Leslie (ed.). Dictionary of National Biography. Vol. 15. London: Smith, Elder & Co.
- Harvey, John Hooper (1954). English Mediaeval Architects: A Biographical Dictionary Down to 1550, Including Master Masons, Carpenters, Carvers, Building Contractors, and Others Responsible for Design. London: Batsford.
- Hofmann, T.M. (1982). "Cromwell, alias Williams, Richard (by 1512-44), of London; Stepney, Mdx. and Hinchingbroke, Hunts.". In Bindoff, S.T. (ed.). The History of Parliament: the House of Commons 1509-1558. Boydell and Brewer.
- Kirk, L.M.; Hawkyard, A.D.K. (1982). "Denys, Sir Thomas (by 1477-1561), of Holcombe Burnell and Bicton, Devon and London". In Bindoff, S.T. (ed.). The History of Parliament: the House of Commons 1509-1558. Boydell and Brewer.
- Le Neve, John (1854). Hardy, Thomas Duffus (ed.). Fasti Ecclesiae Anglicanae: or A Calendar of The Principal Ecclesiast. Dignitaries in England and Wales, and of the Chief Officers in the Univ. Of Oxford And Cambridge, from the Earliest Time to the Year 1760. Vol. 2. Oxford: Oxford University Press.
- MacCulloch, Diarmaid (2018). Thomas Cromwell: A Life. London: Allen Lane. ISBN 9780141967660.
- Newcourt, Richard (1708). Repertorium Ecclesiasticum Parochiale Londinense: An Ecclesiastical Parochial History of the Diocese of London: Containing an Account of the Bishops of that Sea, from the First Foundation Thereof: Also, of the Deans, Archdeacons, Dignitaries and Prebendaries, from the Conquest: and Lastly, of the Several Parish-churches ... Within the Limits of that Diocese, and of Their Patrons and Incumbents: and Also the Endowments of Several Vicarages: and Likewise of the Several Religious Houses that Were Within the Same: Continu'd to the Year of Our Lord, MDCC. In an Alphabetical Order. Vol. 1. London: B. Motte.
- Oliver, George (1846). Monasticon Dioecesis Exoniensis, Being a Collection of Records and Instruments Illustrating the Ancient Conventual, Collegiate, and, Eleemosynary Foundations in the Counties of Cornwall and Devon, with Historical Notices, and a Supplement, Comprising a List of Churches in the Diocese, an Amended Edition of the Taxation of Pope Nicholas, and an Abstract of the Chantry Rolls. Exeter: P.A. Hannaford.
- Orme, Nicholas (May 2015) [2004]. "Dunne [Donne], Gabriel (c. 1490–1558)". Oxford Dictionary of National Biography (online ed.). Oxford University Press. doi:10.1093/ref:odnb/7818. (Subscription, Wikipedia Library access or UK public library membership required.)
- Pole, William (1791). Collections Towards a Description of the County of Devon: By Sir William Pole, of Colcombe and Shute, Kent.; (who Died A.D. 1635;) Now First Printed from the Autograph in the Possession of His Lineal Descendant Sir John-William De la Pole, Bart. of Shute, &c. in Devonshire. London: J. Nichols.
- Risdon, Tristram (1811). The Chorographical Description Or Survey of the County of Devon. London: Rees and Curtis.
- Rowe, Joshua Brooking (1878). Contributions to a History of the Cistercian Houses of Devon. Plymouth: W. Brendon and Son.
- Strype, John (1812). Memorial of the Most Reverend Father in God Thomas Cranmer, Sometime Lord Archbishop of Canterbury : Wherein the History of the Church, and Reformation of It, During the Primacy of the Said Archbishop, are Greatly Illustrated; and Many Singular Matters Relating Thereunto, Now First published (1694.). Vol. 1 (New ed.). Oxford: Clarendon Press.
