= Sir John Robinson, 1st Baronet, of London =

English merchant and politician

Lord Mayor of London
- In office 1662
- Preceded by: Sir John Frederick
- Succeeded by: Anthony Bateman

Personal details
- Born: 10 January 1615
- Died: February 1680 (aged 65)
- Parents: William Robinson (father); Sarah Bainbrigge (mother)

Sir John Robinson, 1st Baronet, of London (10 January 1615 – February 1680) was an English merchant and politician who sat in the House of Commons between 1660 and 1667. He was Lord Mayor of London in 1662.

== Family ==
Robinson was the son of Archdeacon William Robinson, who was half-brother of Archbishop William Laud, and nephew of Sir William Webbe, who was Lord Mayor in 1591.

== Career ==
He was a city of London merchant and a member of the Worshipful Company of Clothworkers. He was one of the court assistants with the Levant Company from 1651 to 1653 and from 1655 to 1656. On 18 December 1655 he was elected an alderman of the City of London for Dowgate ward. He was Master of the Clothworkers Company in 1656. He was Sheriff of London from 1657 to 1658. In 1658 he became alderman for Cripplegate ward. He became a Colonel of the Green Regiment in 1659, holding the position until 1680.

In 1660 Robinson was elected Member of Parliament for the City of London in the Convention Parliament. He was knighted on 26 May 1660, and on 22 June 1660 he was made a baronet. He was Lieutenant of the Tower of London from 1660 to 1680 and became vice-president of the Honourable Artillery Company in 1660.

In 1661 Robinson was elected MP for Rye in the Cavalier Parliament. He became president of the Honourable Artillery Company in 1661 and remained until 1680. In 1662 he was elected Lord Mayor of London. In 1663 he became alderman for Tower ward. He was on the committee of the East India Company from 1666 to 1667, from 1668 to 1674, and from 1675 to 1677, In 1670 he became deputy-governor of the Hudson's Bay Company.

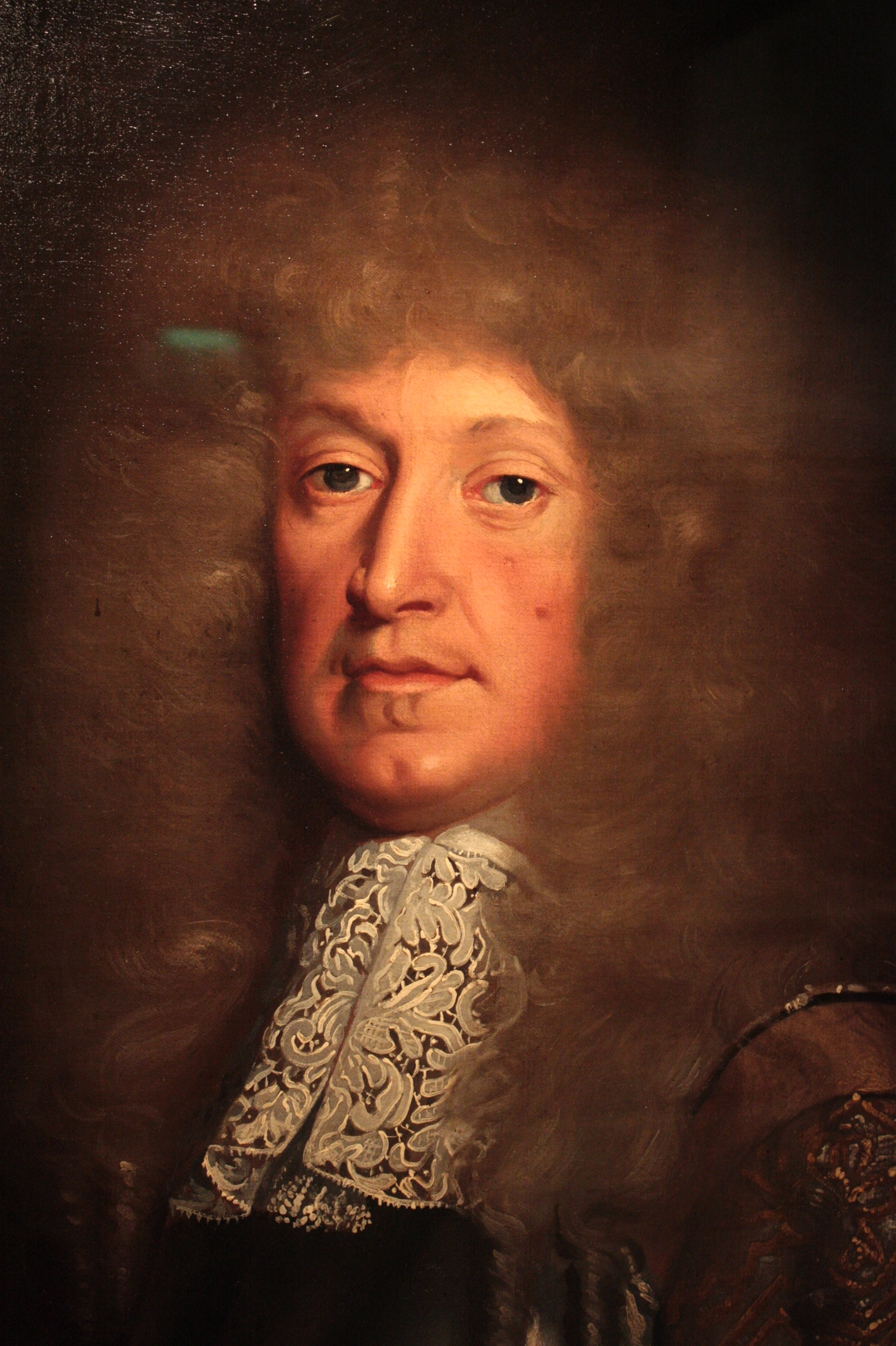
A portrait of Robinson by John Michael Wright (detail, 1662)

== Reputation ==
Samuel Pepys wrote of Robinson as "a talking bragging bufflehead . . . . as very a coxcomb as I would have thought had been in the City . . . . nor hath he brains to outwit any ordinary tradesman". However an account of the aldermen in 1672 said "he hath been most industrious in the civill government of the cittie, watchfull to prevent anything that might reflect any prejudice or dishonour upon the King's government, happy in dispatch of businesse, to the great contentment of the people."

== Succession ==
Robinson was succeeded by Sir John Robinson, 2nd Baronet.

== Notes ==
Parliament of England
Preceded by Isaac Penington	Member of Parliament for the City of London; 1660–1661; With: William Wilde; Sir Richard Browne, Bt; William Vincent	Succeeded by John Fowke; Sir William Thompson; William Love; John Jones
Preceded by Herbert Morley; Richard Spencer	Member of Parliament for Rye; 1661–1679; With: Herbert Morley 1661–1667; Sir John Austen, Bt 1667–1679; Thomas Frewen 1679	Succeeded by Thomas Frewen; Sir John Darell
Civic offices
Preceded by Sir John Frederick	Lord Mayor of the City of London; 1662	Succeeded by Anthony Bateman
Honorary titles
Unknown	Constable of the Tower; 1660–1675	Succeeded by The Earl of Northampton
New office	Lord Lieutenant of the Tower Hamlets; 1660–1675	Succeeded by The Earl of Northampton
Baronetage of England
New creation	Baronet (of London); 1660–1680	Succeeded by John Robinson
