= Hall Place =

Historic building in Bexley, London, England

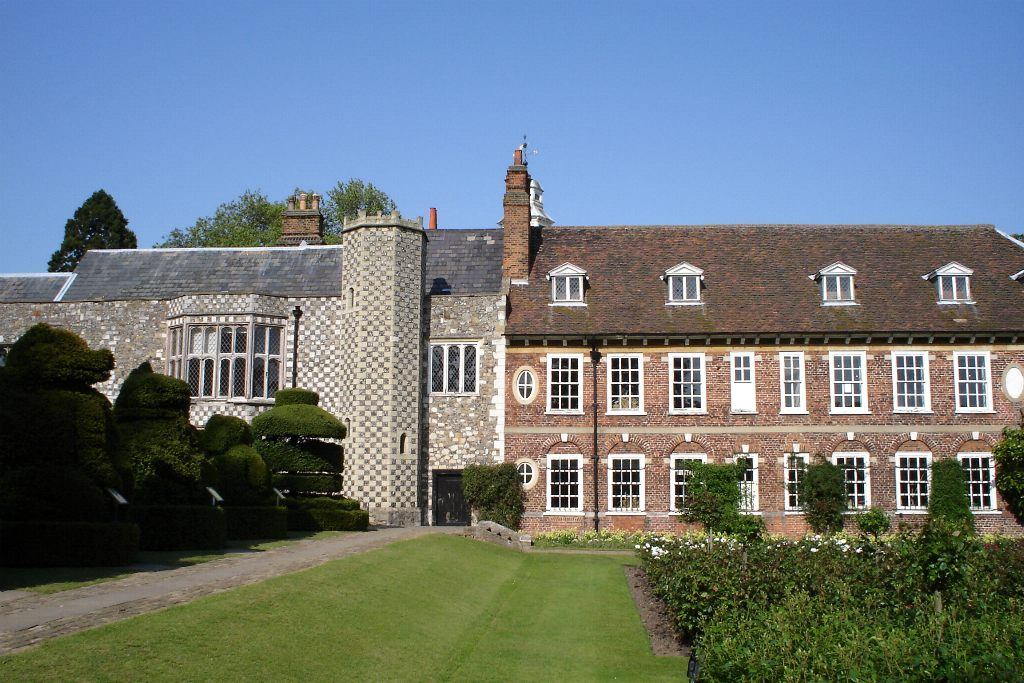
- This picture clearly shows the contrast between the 16th-century stone half of Hall Place, and the 17th-century brick half

- Location within London Borough of Bexley
- 51°26′52.51″N 00°09′33.53″E
- Location: Bourne Road, Bexley
- OS grid reference: TQ5014574318

History
- Built: 1537; extended 1649

Site notes
- Area: London Borough of Bexley
- Governing body: Bexley Heritage Trust

Scheduled monument
- Official name: Hall Place
- Designated: 1 May 1948
- Reference no.: 1001985

Listed Building – Grade I
- Official name: Hall Place
- Designated: 1 October 1953
- Reference no.: 1188277

National Register of Historic Parks and Gardens
- Official name: Hall Place
- Designated: 1 October 1987
- Reference no.: 1000247

Hall Place is a historic building in the London Borough of Bexley in south-east London, built in 1537 for Sir John Champneys, a wealthy merchant and former Lord Mayor of London. The house was extended in 1649 by Sir Robert Austen, a merchant from Tenterden in Kent. The house is a Grade I listed building and Scheduled monument, and surrounded by a 65-hectare award-winning garden. It is situated on the A223, Bourne Road, south of Watling Street (A207) and north of the Black Prince interchange of the A2 dual carriageway and two lesser roads.

== History ==
=== 16th and 17th century ===
Building started on Hall Place in 1537 for wealthy merchant Sir John Champneys, Lord Mayor of the City of London. Building materials included stone recycled from a nearby former monastery, Lesnes Abbey. Sir John's house consisted of a splendid central Great Hall crossed at one end by a service wing and at the other by high status family accommodation including a parlour and great chamber. The outer walls are a distinctive checkerboard pattern made of flint and rubble, a beautiful example of the masonry style popular in the late 15th and 16th century.

In 1649, the house was sold to another wealthy City merchant, Sir Robert Austen (1587–1666), who added a second wing built of red bricks, doubling the size of the house. Little attempt was made to harmonise the two halves, which were built in highly contrasting architectural styles. Austen was created 1st Baronet, of Hall Place in Bexley, on 10 July 1660 and briefly held the office of High Sheriff of Kent.

=== 18th and 19th century ===
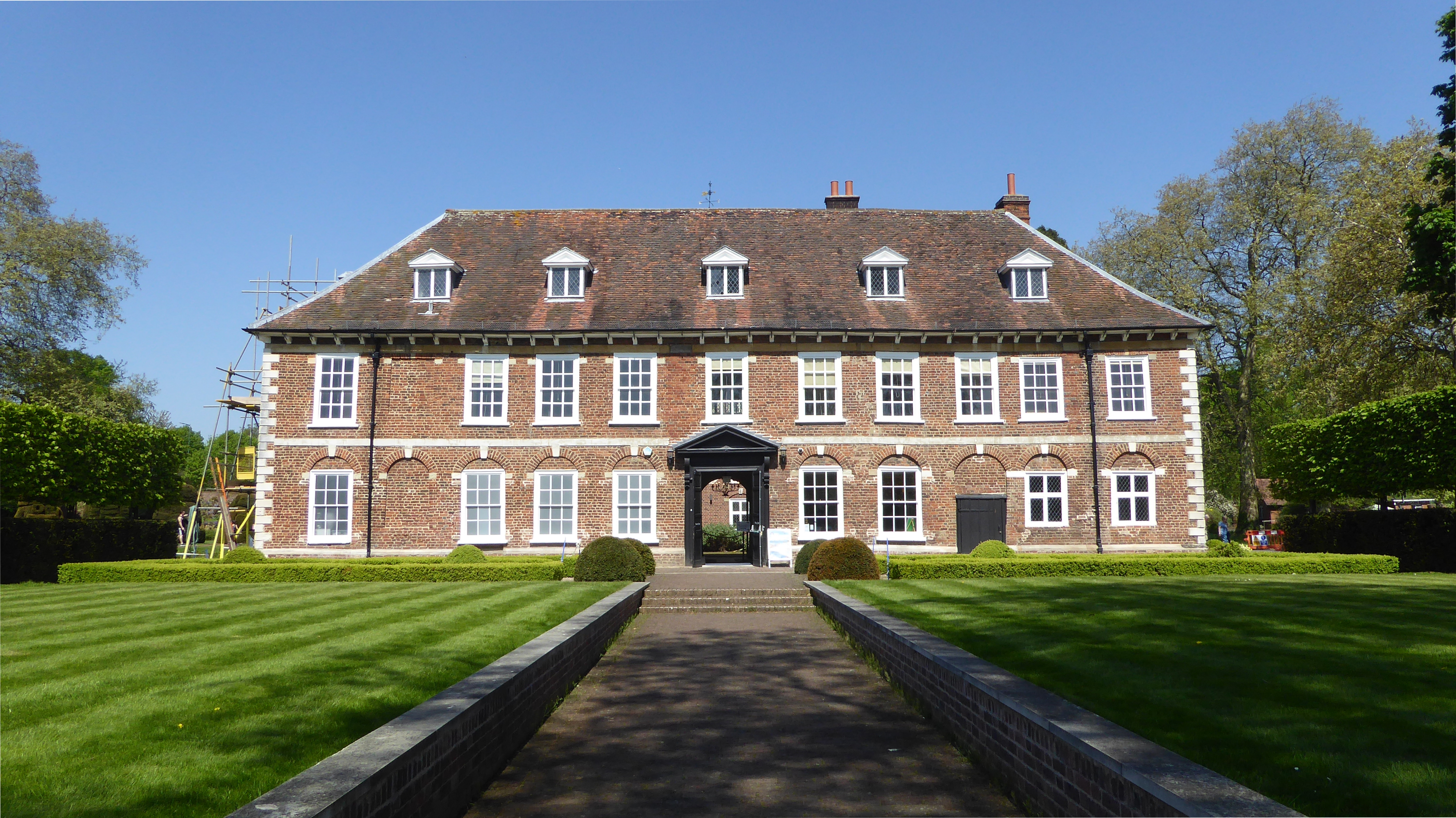
The south face of Hall Place

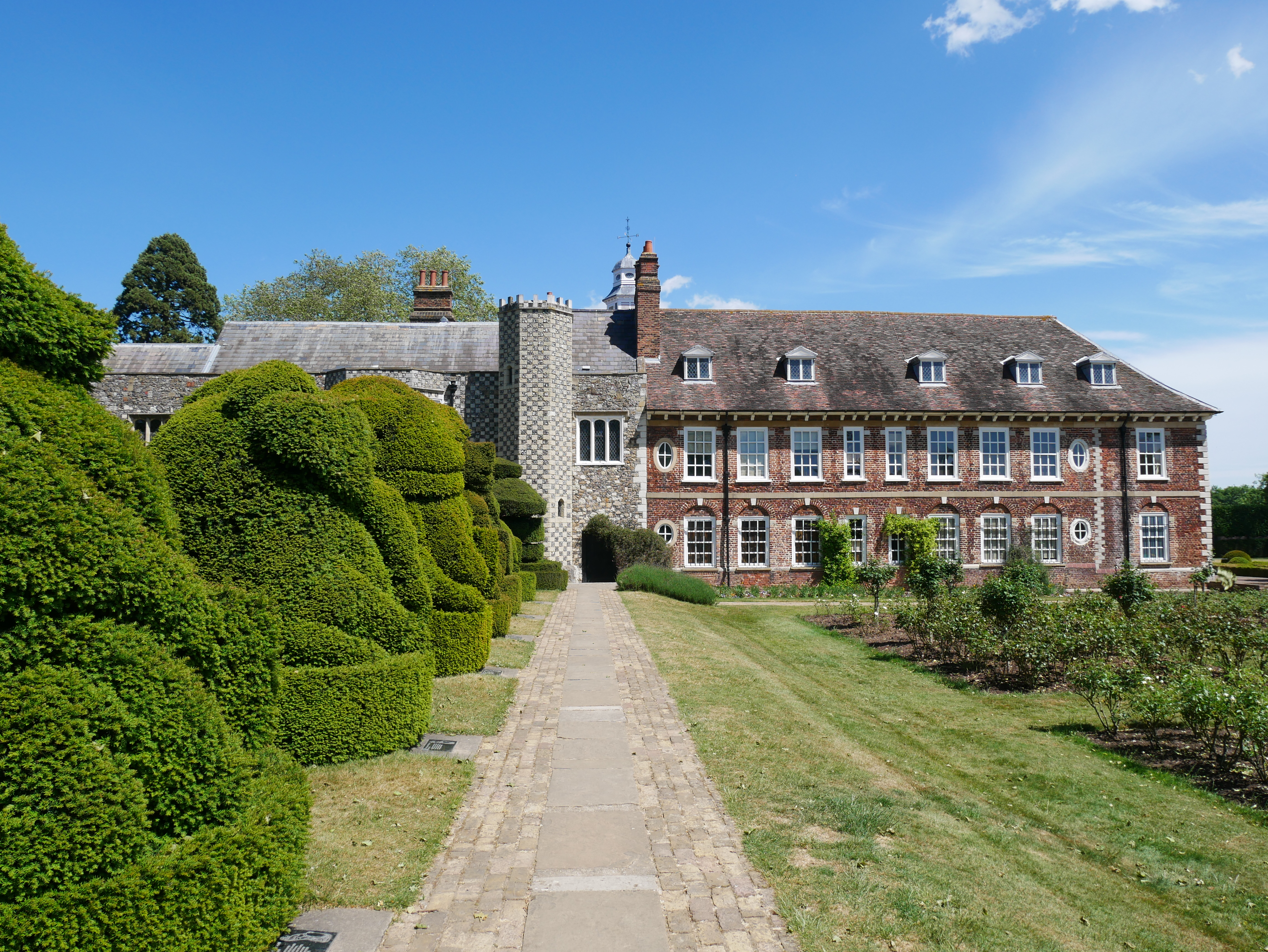
The west face of Hall Place

The house remained in the Austen family until the mid 18th century when Robert Austen died and the estate was purchased by a distant relative Sir Francis Dashwood. Dashwood was a politician and Chancellor of the Exchequer from 1762 to 1763, but he was also a known rake and founder of the secret and immoral Hellfire Club. Hall Place was one of a number of properties owned and managed by the Dashwood family, whose principal home was West Wycombe Park in Buckinghamshire. From 1795 Hall Place was leased as a school for young gentlemen.

It was Maitland Dashwood, grandson of Sir Francis, who made the next set of significant changes to the fabric of Hall Place beginning in the 1870s. Maitland and his architect Robert William Edis added the lodge, linked the house to the water mains and altered the interior by adding much of the fine wood panelling and parquet flooring. These improvements were made to prepare the house for lease.

The 19th and early 20th century saw a series of short-term leases to the aristocratic and the fashionable. The tenants during this period reflected a new glamorous pre-war elite and included Baron Emile Beaumont d'Erlanger and his American wife Matilda, a former Gaiety girl.

The last tenant of Hall Place was Lady Limerick who lived here alone from 1917 – 1943, she added a number of mock-Tudor features including beams and fireplaces. Lady Limerick and the house appeared in a 1922 edition of Country Life magazine.

=== Second World War ===
In January 1944 the U.S Army's Signal Corps 6811th Signal Service Detachment arrived at Hall Place to operate an intercept station, code named Santa Fe. This Y Station was set up in a new spirit of co-operation between British and American intelligence services.

The Signal Corps were to participate in the Enigma code breaking operation, Ultra. The Santa Fe Y station intercepted encoded Morse signals mostly from the German Air Force and the Luftwaffe. Radio aerial wires were strung over the rooftops and the Tudor Kitchen and Great Hall were converted into ‘set rooms’ with banks of Hallicrafters radio receivers lined up on wood-plank tables. The Great Parlour became the soldier's dormitory.

Post-war Hall Place was used as an annex to the local technical school for girls. From 1968 to 1995 the building was used as the headquarters of Bexley's Libraries and Museums service.

== Hall Place and gardens today ==
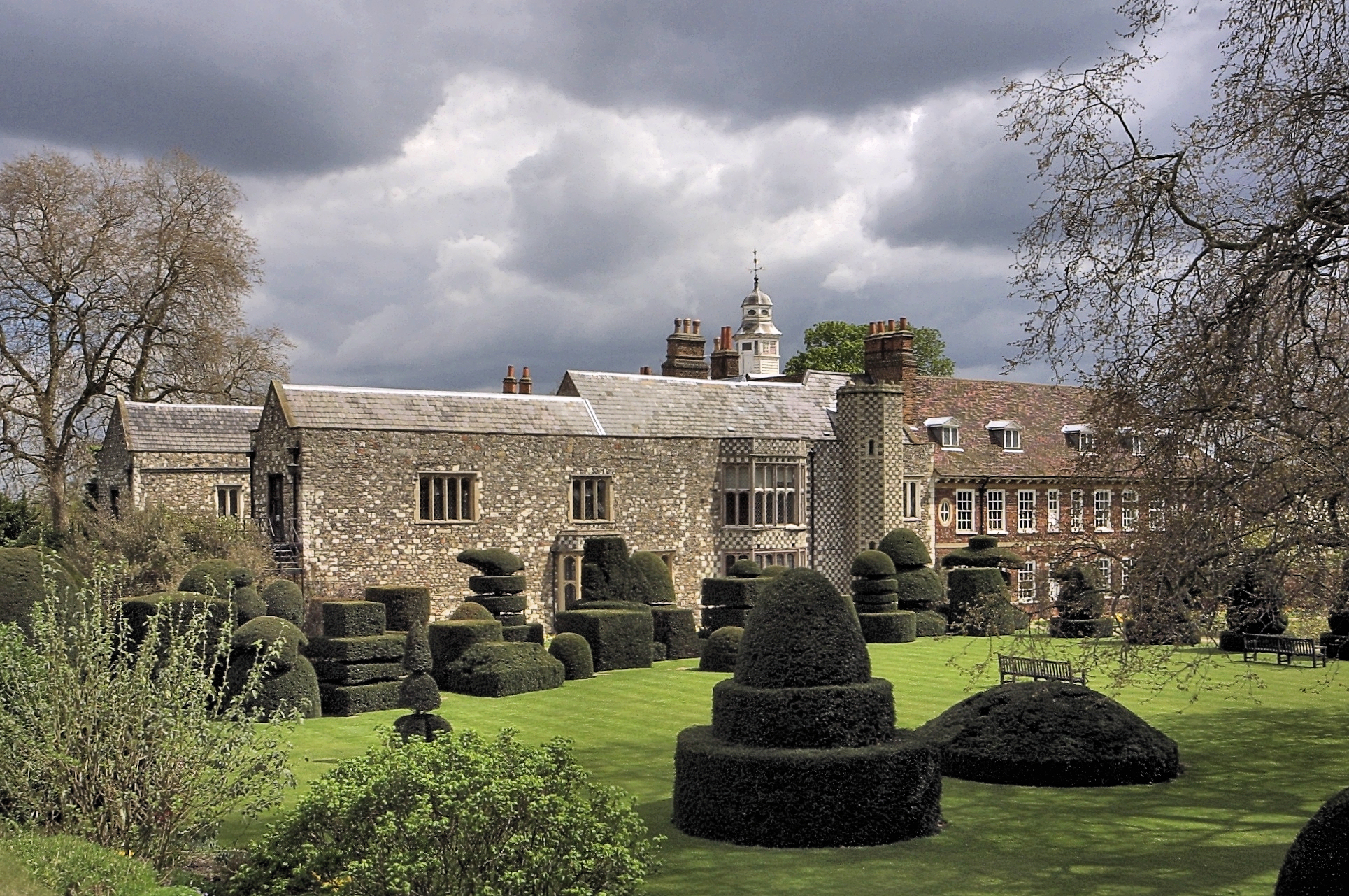
A view of Hall Place showing the topiary garden

Today Hall Place is restored to its original Tudor and later 17th-century designs. The property is managed by the charity Bexley Heritage Trust.

In June 2005 Bexley Heritage Trust received a £2 million grant from the Heritage Lottery Fund to develop and improve the site for the benefit of visitors. This grant enabled the construction of the Riverside Cafe alongside the River Cray, a new visitor centre and an education suite. A 17th-century stable block was also converted into an art gallery, which displays works by local artists. The house itself is used as an exhibition space.

== Gardens ==
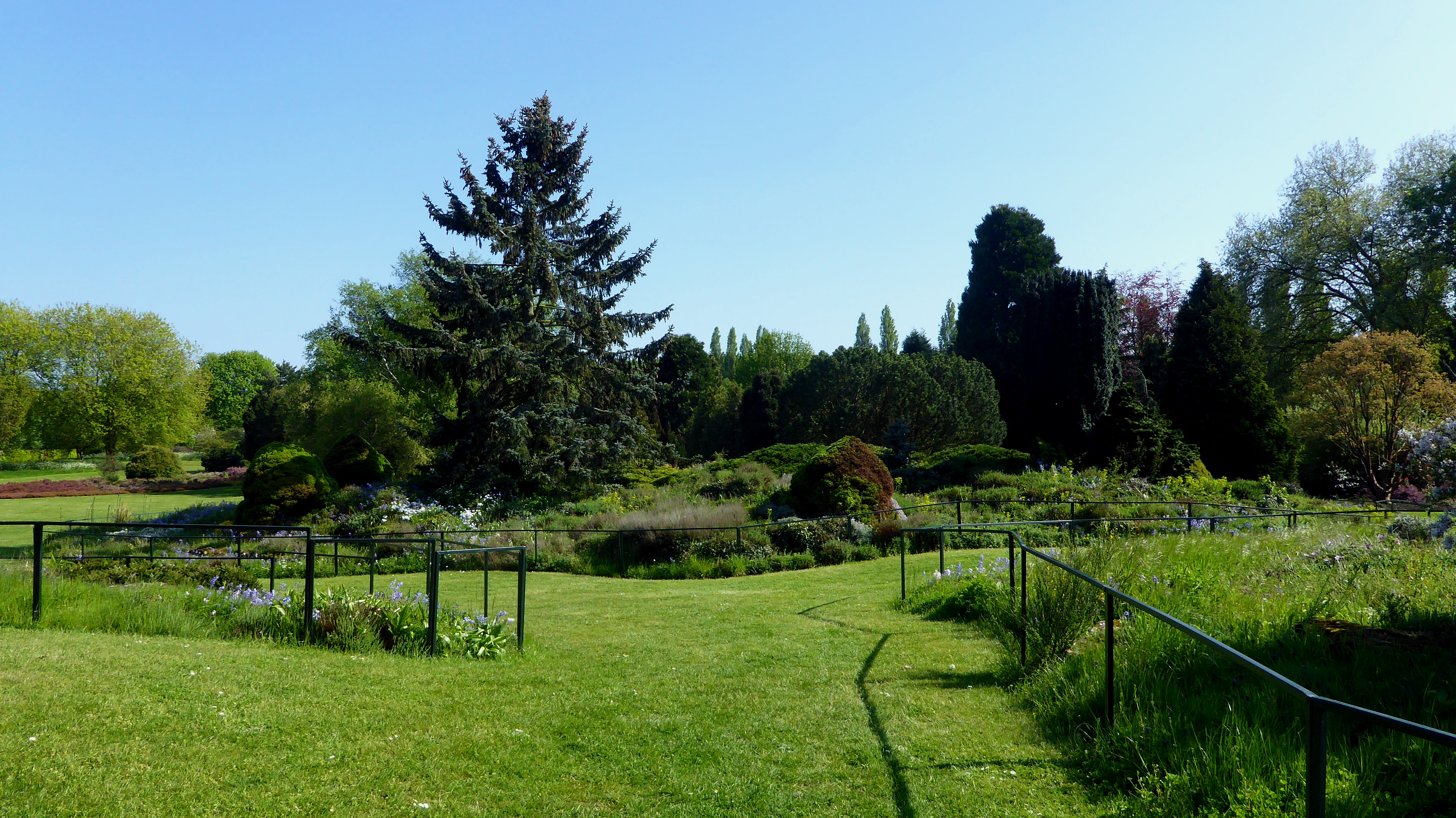
Ornamental garden at Hall Place

The Hall Place estate includes 65 hectares of landscaped gardens and grounds, a topiary lawn, herb garden, tropical garden and long herbaceous cottage garden-styled borders.

The gardens at Hall Place were first opened to the public in 1952 by the Duchess of Kent. The famous topiary at Hall Place, the Queen's Beasts, were planted in 1953 in celebration of the coronation of Elizabeth II.

The former walled gardens include a tropical butterfly house and owl sanctuary. Specimen trees in the grounds include an Indian Bean Tree (Catalpa bignonioides), a Redwood (Sequoia sempervirens), and a Black Poplar (Populus nigra) – planted to commemorate the Diamond Jubilee of Elizabeth II in 2012 by the local Mayor and the Deputy lieutenant of Bexley.

The site achieved a Green Flag Award for excellence in a public park or garden for 20 consecutive years 1996–2016, in recognition of the high standard of maintenance and cultivation at the site.

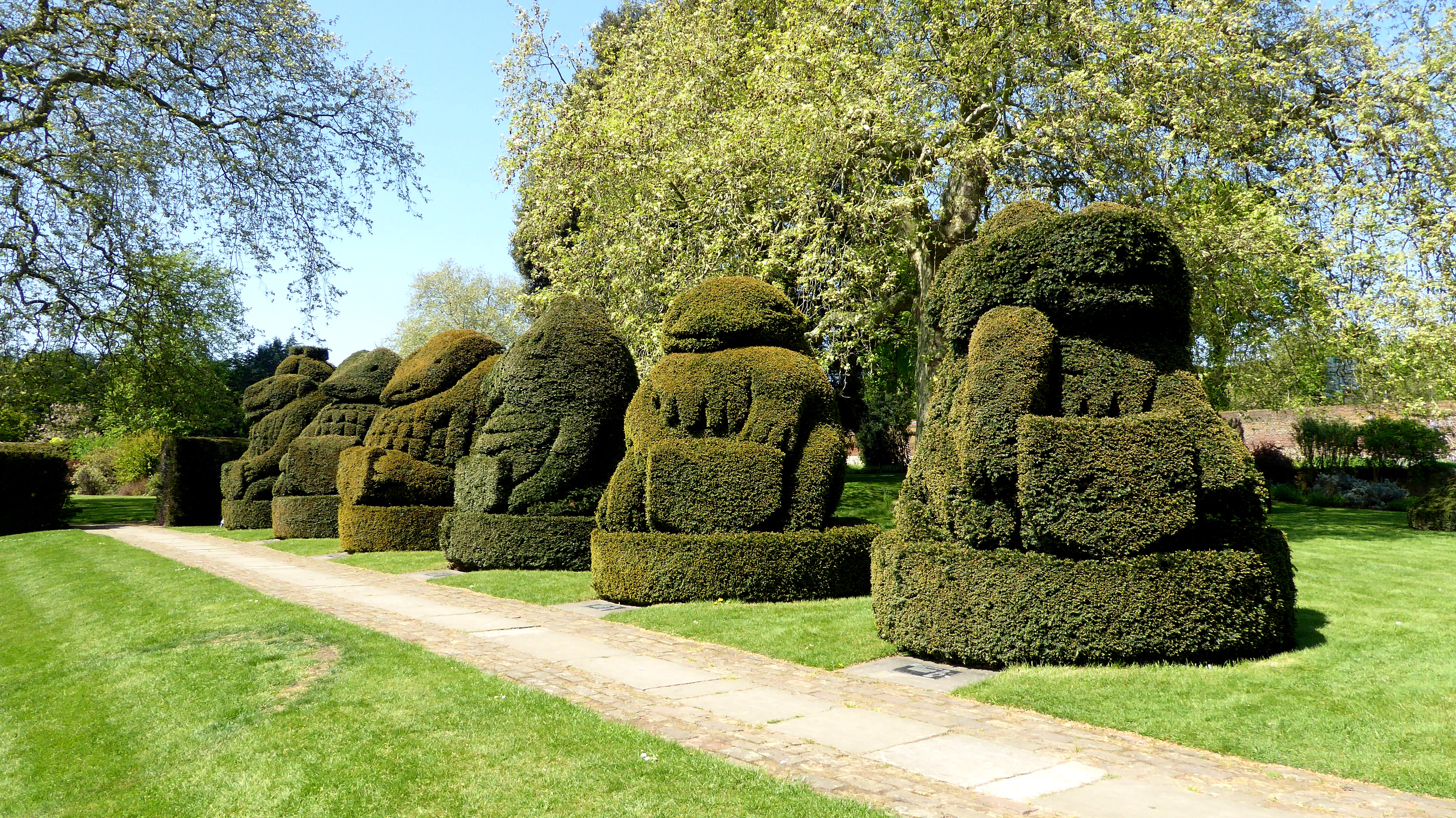
Topiary animals
