= Richard Williams (alias Cromwell) =

Welsh soldier and courtier (c. 1510–1544)

The Honourable Sir Richard Williams
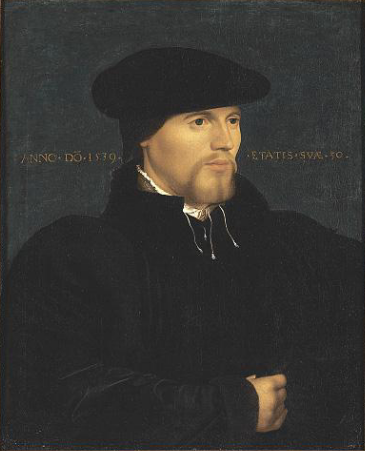
- Portrait of a Man in Black, perhaps Sir Richard Williams (alias Cromwell), circa 1600, follower of Hans Holbein

Member of Parliament for Huntingdonshire
- In office 1539–1540
- In office 1542–1544

Personal details
- Born: c. 1510 Llanishen, Glamorganshire, Wales
- Died: 20 October 1544 (aged 33–34)
- Spouse: Frances Murfyn (m. 1534; died 1543)
- Children: Henry; Francis
- Parents: Morgan Williams; Katherine Cromwell

Sir Richard Williams (c. 1510 – 20 October 1544), also known as Sir Richard Cromwell, was a Welsh soldier and courtier in the reign of Henry VIII, who knighted him on 2 May 1540. (Note: Noble 1787, pp. 11, 12 explains that the reason for Sir Richard Williams, the great grandfather of Oliver Cromwell, changing his name, from Williams to Cromwell. Henry VIII strongly recommended it to the Welsh (whom he incorporated with the English) to adopt the English practice in taking family names, instead of their manner of adding their father's, and perhaps grandfather's name to their own Christian one with 'nap' or 'ap', as Morgan ap William, or Rich, ap Morgan ap William; i.e. Rich, the son of Morgan the son of Will, and the king was the more anxious as it was found so inconvenient in identifying persons in judicial matters. For these reasons, the Welsh, about this time, dropped the 'ap' in many of their names; or, if it could be done with convenience as to pronunciation, left out the a, and joined the p to their father's Christian name (Camden's remains; from which it appears that many Christian names were appropriated to families; for the reasons above "we have the Williams's, Lewis's, Morgans, etc. etc. without number, and, by joining the p, the Pritchards, Powels, Parrys, i.e. ap Richard, ap Howell, ap Harry, etc. etc). Thus Mr Morgan ap William, Sir Richard's father, seems, from the pedigree, to have taken the family name of Williams; but, as the surname of Williams was of so late standing, his majesty recommended it to Sir Richard, to use that of Cromwell, in honour of his uncle Thomas Cromwell, 1st Earl of Essex, whose present greatness entirely obliterated his former meanness (Various lives of Oliver, lord protector, etc. as also miss Cromwell's pedigree); and it is observable, that Sir Richard's brothers also changed their name to Cromwell (Will of Sir Richard Williams, alias Cromwell, prerogative-office, London, Alen 20. Pedigree of the Williams's, alias Cromwells, Harl. M.S.S. vol. 1174, and Harl. M.S.S. vol. 4135). Thus did the Williams's take, or super-add the surname of Cromwell to that of Williams; and, in almost all their deeds and wills, they constantly wrote themselves Williams, alias Cromwell, down to the seventeenth century. Though the cause of this change is well known, the time is not: many writers pretend the name of Cromwell was not taken up until the time that Sir Richard, was knighted during a tournament; but this is certainly erroneous, as there are grants of ecclesiastical lands patted to him by his names of Williams, alias Cromwell, as early as 1538: these authors are equally mistaken in supposing that the king never knew Sir Richard until the tournament, which cannot be; because those very grants patted some time before these martial games. With the name of Cromwell, Sir Richard assumed the arms of that family; but Sir Henry, his son, and his descendants, retook the proper arms of the Williams's, and never used any other (if the augmentation of the crest is excepted).) He was a maternal nephew of Thomas Cromwell, profiting from the Dissolution of the Monasteries in which he took an active part. He was the patrilineal great-grandfather of Oliver Cromwell.

== Early life ==
Richard Williams was born about 1510 in the parish of Llanishen, Glamorganshire. He was the eldest son of Morgan (ap William) Williams (Llanishen, Glamorgan, 1469 - Putney, Derbyshire, bef. 12 July 1529), an aspiring Welsh lawyer (son of William ap Yevan and a paternal descendant of Cadwgan ap Bleddyn, prince of Powys), who was possibly the same Morgan Williams later recorded as a brewer at Putney, Greenwich and elsewhere. Morgan Williams married Katherine Cromwell (died bef. 12 July 1529), the sister of Thomas Cromwell, long before the latter came to power under Henry VIII, but Williams and his son would eventually benefit substantially from this relationship, receiving large amounts of land confiscated from the church.

== Protégé of Thomas Cromwell ==
Richard was to enter the court of King Henry VIII thanks to his relationship to the powerful minister Thomas Cromwell, who rose from humble origins to become before his death Earl of Essex, Vicar-General, and Knight of the Garter. At the time when Thomas Cromwell made his will in July 1529, his nephew's parents had died and the young man was in the service of the Marquess of Dorset (father of Henry Grey, and grandfather of Lady Jane Grey). By the autumn of 1529, he had adopted the name Cromwell, and following Dorset's death in 1530, he was employed by Stephen Gardiner until early 1533, when he joined his uncle's household at Austin Friars and while in his service was introduced at court. For the next ten years, as Richard Cromwell alias Williams, he was employed in both public and private matters and served as a channel of communication with the minister. Closely involved with his uncle's work, he was in a position to benefit from the redistribution of property at his uncle's hands. He was entrusted with considerable appointments at a young age, and apparently took an active part in suppressing the Pilgrimage of Grace insurrection.

== Dissolution of the Monasteries ==
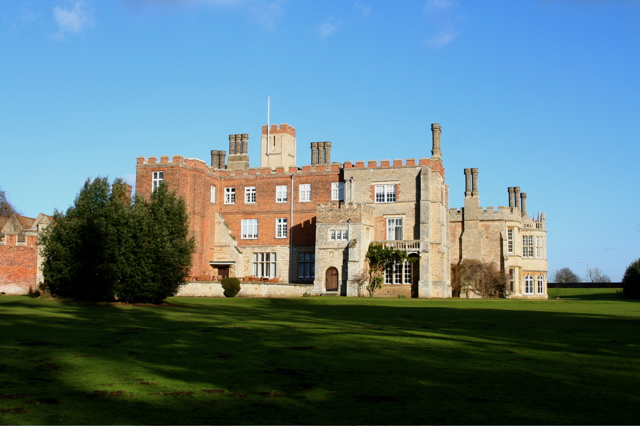
Hinchingbrooke House

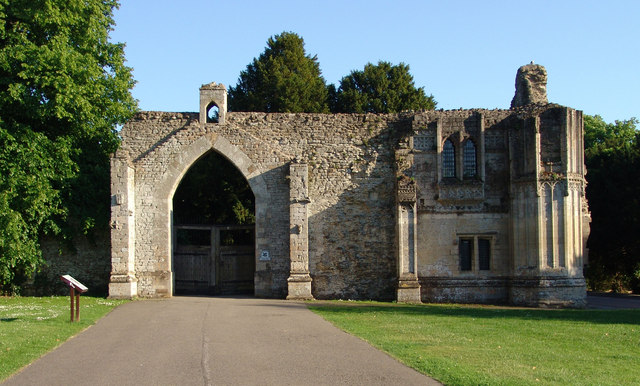
Ramsey Abbey Gatehouse

During the Dissolution of the Monasteries, Sir Richard was appointed one of the Visitors of the religious houses, and received an ample reward for this work, perhaps thanks to his uncle's influence.

On 8 March 1537/8 he was granted the nunnery of Hinchingbrooke, in Huntingdonshire. The stated value of the property in the deed of grant was only £19. 9s. 2d., but this appears to have been a considerable under-rating, since it included land and premises not only in the parishes and hamlets of Hinchinbrooke, Huntingdon, Stewkley-Magna, Stewkley-Parva, Turkington, Houghton, Esington, Alconbury, Paxton-Magna, Paxton-Parva, Hail Weston, Waresley and Bawynhoo in Huntingdonshire, but also Eltisley, Bottisham and Boxworth in Cambridgeshire, Staplewe and Bewlow in Bedfordshire, Hamildon-Parva in Rutland, and Stoke Doyle and Oakley in Northamptonshire. In that same year he also received a royal grant of the monastery of Sawtry-Judith, in the county of Huntingdon, which was valued at £199 11s. 1d.

On 9 April 1539, for a fee of only £1 0s. 5d., he was granted property in Eynesbury, Eton, and Little Paxton in Huntingdonshire that had formerly belonged to the chantry of Swavesey in Cambridgeshire, and he received Greyfriars Abbey in Great Yarmouth in Norfolk from the King that same year. On 4 March 1540 he came into possession of the site of the rich Abbey of Ramsey in Huntingdonshire, which included the various meres or lakes belonging to it. The terms of this grant state that it was made in consideration of his good service, in return for a payment of £4,963 4s. 2d. to be held in capite by knights service. This was a considerable sum of money at that time, but was dwarfed by the value of the abbey in question, which in addition returned an annual revenue of £1,987. 15s. 3d per year. Although he had to purchase many of the other grants, the cost was probably relatively nominal, since many of the dissolved religious houses were sold off for almost nothing, and he was in favour with the King thanks to his role as Visitor and as the nephew of Thomas Cromwell. According to Mark Noble, "all these grants passed to him by the names of Rich. Williams, otherwise Cromwell".

== Member of Parliament and High Sheriff ==
By 1539 he was a gentleman of the privy chamber, and in the same year was elected MP for the seat of Huntingdonshire. In 1539, or early 1540, at the age of thirty, he may have been the subject of a portrait by Hans Holbein the Younger.

He was knighted on 2 May 1540 during a tournament at Westminster where he distinguished himself by his military skill and gallantry:

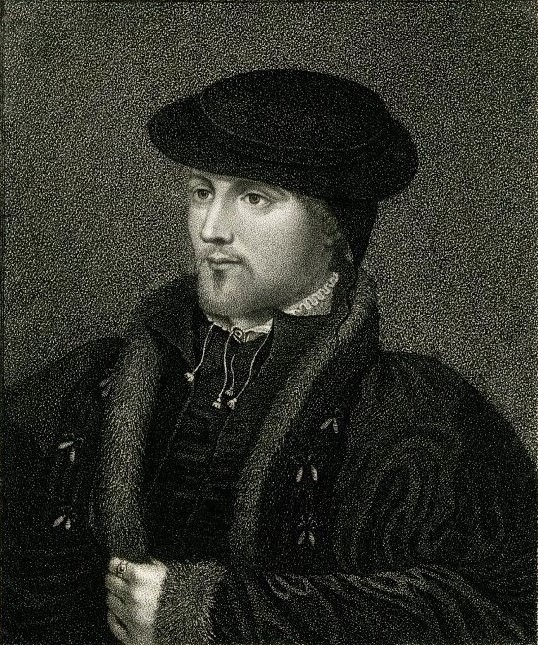
Cromwell, perhaps Sir Richard Cromwell, 1793, engraved by Luigi Schiavonetti

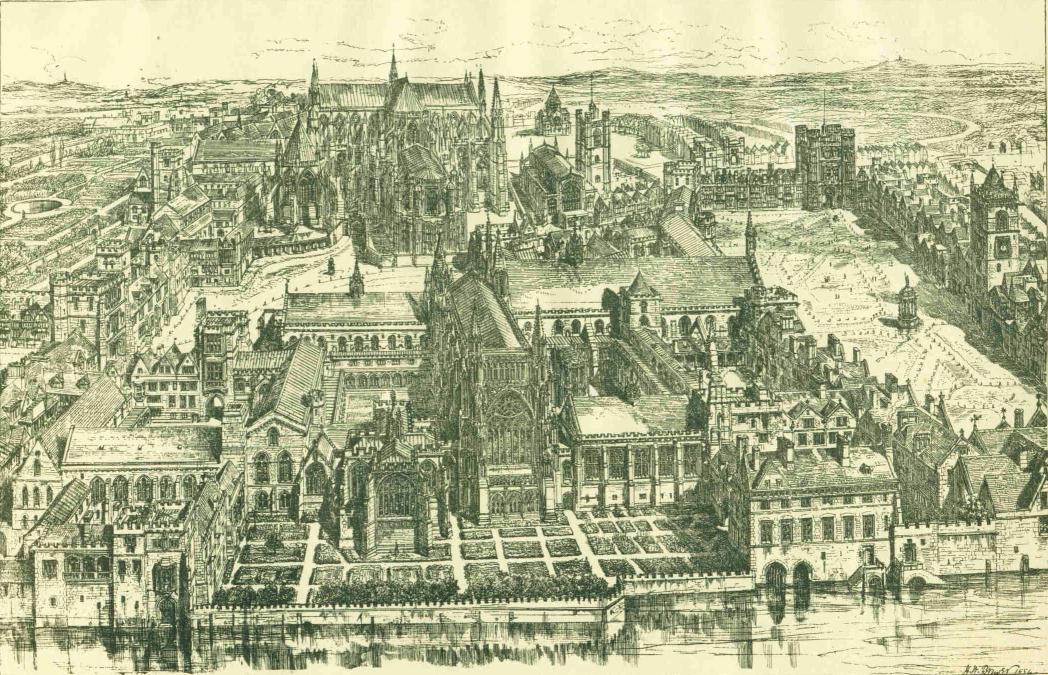
Palace of Westminster in the time of Henry VIII

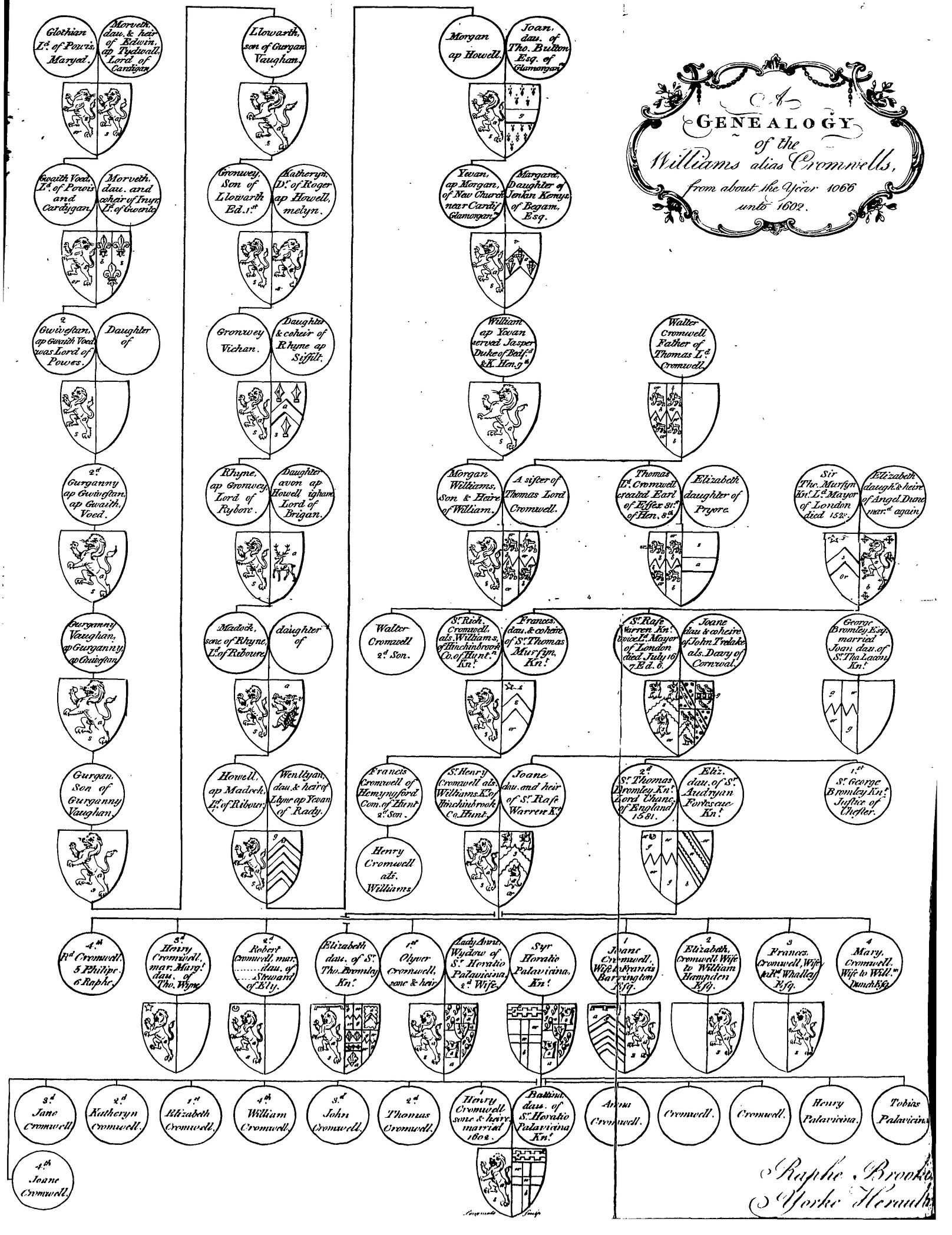
Genealogy of the Williams alias Cromwells, from about 1066 to 1602

On May day was a great triumph of jousting at Westminster, which jousts had been proclaimed in France, Flanders, Scotland, and Spain, for all comers that would, against the challengers of England, which were Sir John Dudly, Sir T. Seymour, Sir T. Poynings, Sir George Carew, knights; Anthony Kingston, and Richard Cromwell, esquires; which said challengers came into the lists that day, richly apparelled, and their horses trapped all in white velvet, with certain knights, and gentlemen riding afore them, apparelled all with velvet and white sarsnet, and all their servants in white doublets, and hosen cut all in the Burgonion fashion, and there came to joust against them, the said day, of defendants 46, the earl of Surrey being the foremost; Lord Williame Howard, Lord Clinton, and Lord Cromwell, son and heir to T. Cromwell, earl of Essex, and chamberlain of England, with other, which were all richly apparelled: and that day sir John Dudley was overthrown in the field by mischance of his horse, by one Andrew Breme; nevertheless, he brake divers spears valiantly after that; and after the said jousts done, the said challengers rode to Durham-place, where they kept open household, and feasted the king and queen, with their ladies, and all the court. The 2nd of May, Anthony Kingstone, and Richard Cromwell, were made knights of the same place. The 3rd of May, the said challengers did Tourney on horseback, with swords; against them came 29 defendants: Sir John Dudley and the earl of Surrey running first, which the first course lost their gauntlets, and that day Sir Richard Cromwell overthrew M. Palmer in the field off his horse, to the great honour of the challengers. The 5th of May, the said challengers fought on foot, at the barriers, and against them came 30 defendants which fought valiantly, but Sir Richard Cromwell overthrew that day, at the barriers, M. Culpepper in the field; and the 6th of May the said challengers brake up their household. In the which time of their house-keeping, they had not only feasted the king, queen, ladies, and the whole court, as was aforesaid, but on the Tuesday in the rogation week, they feasted all the knights and burgesses of the common house in the parliament; and on the morrow after they had the mayor of London, the aldermen, and all their wives to dinner: and on the Friday they brake it up as is aforesaid.

Sir Richard and the five other challengers were granted 100 marks annually as a reward for their valour and a house each from the estates of the monastery of the Friary of St Francis, in Stamford, which had been dissolved on 8 October 1538, grants which were made possible by the fact that Sir William Weston, the last prior, who had an annuity out of the monastery, died two days after the jousts. According to an anecdote reported by Noble, "when Henry saw Sir Richard's prowess he exclaimed, 'Formerly thou wast my Dick, but hereafter thou shalt be my diamond'; and dropped a diamond ring from his finger, which Sir Richard taking up, he presented it to him, bidding him afterwards bear such a one in the fore gamb of the demy lion in his crest".

The fall and execution of Sir Richard's uncle Thomas Cromwell, 1st Earl of Essex, in July 1540, apparently had no adverse effect on his social standing or private fortune. He was appointed High Sheriff of Cambridgeshire and Huntingdonshire in 1541, and was again returned as the Member of Parliament for Huntingdonshire in the parliament which began 16 January 1542. He received a grant from the King in 1542 of Huntingdon Priory and St Neots Priory, with yearly revenues of £232 7s. and £256 1s. 3d. respectively.

In addition he was at some unknown date given the office of steward of the lordship of Archenfield, with the constableship of Goodrich Castle in the Welsh Marches, and the power of appointing the master serjeant and porter belonging to those offices during the minority of the Earl of Shrewsbury. He also received the priory of St Helen Bishopsgate in London, the castles, lordships, and manors of Manorbier and Penally, both in the county of Pembroke, valued at £100, to be held by knights' service, and Neath Abbey in Glamorgan, which he chose to obtain by exchange for other lands, possibly because it was close to his birthplace.

== War in France ==
When war broke out with France in 1543, he took part in the campaign as commander of the cavalry. (Note: Noble notes that in the expedition to France were the flower of the English chivalry: Sir John Wallop, governor of Guînes, commander in chief; Sir Thomas Seymour, marshal of the army; Sir Robert Bowes, treasurer; Sir George Carew, lieutenant to Sir Richard Cromwell; Sir Thomas Palmer, porter of Calais; Sir Thomas Rainsford, Sir John St John, and Sir John Gascoigne, captain of foot.) A force of 6,000 men under Sir John Wallop crossed the Channel and marched out of Calais on 22 July to join the Emperor Charles V in his attempt to retake the town of Landrecies, which had recently been captured by the French. King Francis I of France successfully resupplied the besieged city by appearing with a large army and making as if to give battle, which drew off the forces of the Emperor and his allies long enough for fresh troops, ammunition and provisions to reach the city, after which the main body of the French slipped away. In response the allies attacked the rearguard under the command of the Dauphin, and were themselves ambushed by the retreating troops, with many of the English being taken prisoner, including Sir George Carew (admiral), Sir Thomas Palmer, and Sir Edward Bellingham. Nevertheless, the English succeeded in killing or capturing great numbers of the French who fell behind as stragglers. Since there was no longer any prospect of recapturing Landrecies and the weather was too bad for a winter campaign, the Emperor disbanded his army in November and the English contingent were able to return home.

During this campaign Sir Richard apparently saved the life of the commander, Sir John Wallop, and in the following year was appointed constable of Berkeley Castle in Gloucestershire.

== Marriage and issue ==
By 8 March 1534 Richard had married Frances (c. 1520–c. 1543), daughter to Thomas Murfyn (d.1523), an alderman and a former Lord Mayor of London, and his second wife, Elizabeth Donne, daughter to Sir Angel Donne and Anne Hawardine. Frances's stepfather, Sir Thomas Denys, whom her mother married in 1524, was a "great man of Devon" and friend of Thomas Cromwell. The couple had two sons:

- Henry Williams, alias Cromwell (1537–1604), Richard's eldest son and heir, grandfather of Oliver Cromwell.
- Francis Williams, alias Cromwell (c. 1541–1598), who was one of the Knights of the Shire for the county of Huntingdon in 1572, and later Sheriff of Cambridgeshire and Huntingdonshire. According to Fuller, he lived at Hinchingbrooke, but his usual place of residence was at Hemingford in Huntingdonshire. He married Margaret, the daughter of Henry Mannock of Hemingford Grey, and died 4 August 1598. From the inquisitio post mortem taken at St Ives on 16 November, it appears that he left a son and heir, Henry Williams, alias Cromwell, aged 33. His possessions were recorded as the Fermerne, the former site of St Neots Priory, the manor of St Neots, which brought in an annual income of £14 and included 80 acres of pasture, called Little and Great-Dirty Wintringham, and also the manors of Grafham, valued at £9. per annum, and Hardwick, valued at £14. per annum and held of the king by knights' service.

== Death ==
His wife was still living in June 1542, but had died before her husband made his will, dated 20 June 1544, before leaving for France as part of Henry VIII's large-scale invasion that summer. He died on 20 October 1544, possibly as a consequence of the campaign.

In his will he styled himself as Sir Richard Williams, otherwise called Sir Richard Cromwell, knight, of his majesty's privy chamber. He gave orders that his body should be buried in whatever place he was located at the time of his death, and bequeathed his estates in the counties of Cambridge, Huntingdon, Lincoln, and Bedford to his eldest son Henry, with the sum of £500 to purchase him necessary furniture when he came of age. His estates in Glamorganshire were left to his son Francis, and £300 went to each of his nieces, Joan, and Ann, daughters of his brother, Walter Cromwell, with the proviso that if Thomas Wingfield, then Sir Richard's ward, should choose to marry either of them, he should have his wardship remitted to him. Otherwise the wardship was to be sold. He also left three of his best great horses to the King, and one other great horse to his cousin, Gregory Cromwell, to be selected after the King had made his choice.

Other legacies were left to his kinsmen Sir John Williams and Sir Edward North, chancellor of the Court of Augmentations, as well as to several other people, presumably servants. Gabriel Donne, Andrew Judde, William Coke, Philip Lentall, and Richard Servington were appointed executors, and instructed to use the income from the remainder of his property to repay £3,000 that he owed in debts. His will was proved on 24 November 1546.

This inheritance clearly amounted to an enormous fortune, given the various lucrative offices he held and the large-scale grants and purchases of church lands that had come into his possession thanks to the King's favour; the rent of his possessions in Huntingdonshire alone came to at least £3,000 a year. Noble stated in 1787 that the revenue brought in by those estates in and near Ramsey (Note: Noble 1787, pp. 18, 19 notes: The abbey of Ramsey, i.e. the Ram's isle, was one of the richest foundations in the kingdom: the abbot was mitred, and sat in the house of lords as baron of Broughton; the abbey had 387 hides of land, 200 of which were in Huntingdonshire: the monks were not famed for their liberality, if we believe the following ancient lines: Crowland as courteous, as courteous as may bee, Thorney the bane of many a good Tree, Ramsey the rich, and Peterborough the proud, Sawtry by the way that poor abbay, Gave more almes than all they. Dugdale, and others, mistake when they say that Sir Richard Williams, alias Cromwell, had all the ecclesiastical lands belonging to the dissolved foundations in that country.) and Huntingdon in his own day was equal to that of any peer at that time, and yet Sir Richard is known to have owned considerable property in several other counties as well.

== Arms ==
Coat of arms of Richard Williams, alias Cromwell
Adopted 1534 Crest A demi-lion rampant Or, charged with three chevronels Gules, holding between the paws a plummet Azure. Escutcheon Gules, three chevronels Argent, over all three lions rampant Or, armed and langued Azure. Motto Ie attende fortune (French for 'I await fortune')

== Citations ==
Attribution
