= Sir Robert Austen, 3rd Baronet =

Sir Robert Austen, 3rd Baronet (March 1664 – June 1706), was an English politician who sat in the House of Commons from 1699 to 1701.

Austen was the son of Sir John Austen, 2nd Baronet. He was educated at St Alban's School and Peterhouse, Cambridge. He succeeded to the title of 3rd Baronet Austen of Hall Place in Bexley, Kent, upon the death of his father in January 1699.

Austen was elected Member of Parliament (MP) for Rye on 23 January 1699, and held the seat until November, 1701, when he did not stand. He subsequently stood unsuccessfully for Kent in 1705.

Austen married Elizabeth Stawell, daughter of George Stawell of Cothelstone Somerset. He died aged 42 and was buried at Bexley. His son, Robert, succeeded in the baronetcy.

Parliament of Great Britain
Preceded by Sir John Austen, Bt; Joseph Offley	Member of Parliament for Rye; 1699–1701; With: Joseph Offley	Succeeded by Thomas Fagg; Joseph Offley
Baronetage of England
Preceded by John Austen	Baronet (of Bexley); 1699–1706	Succeeded by Robert Austen
