= Austen baronets =

Extinct baronetcy in the Baronetage of England

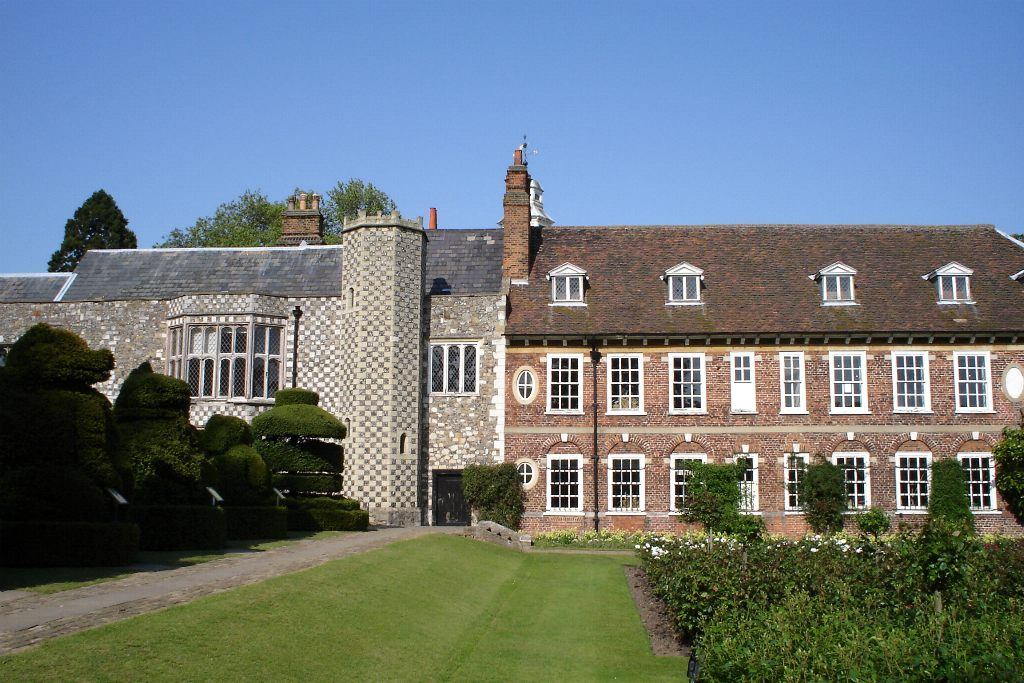
Hall Place, the seat of the Austen baronets of Bexley

There have been two Baronetcies created for persons with the surname Austen, one in the Baronetage of England and one in the Baronetage of Great Britain. Both creations are extinct.

The Austen Baronetcy, of Bexley in the County of Kent, was created in the Baronetage of England on 10 July 1660 for Robert Austen of Hall Place, Bexley, Kent, High Sheriff of Kent in 1660 and 1661. The second and third Baronets both represented Rye in Parliament. The fourth Baronet sat as Member of Parliament for New Romney. The title became extinct on the death of the seventh Baronet on 13 February 1772.

The Austen Baronetcy, of Derehams in the County of Middlesex, was created in the Baronetage of Great Britain on 16 November 1714 for John Austen, Member of Parliament for Middlesex. The title became extinct on his death on 22 March 1742.

== Austen baronets, of Bexley (1660) ==
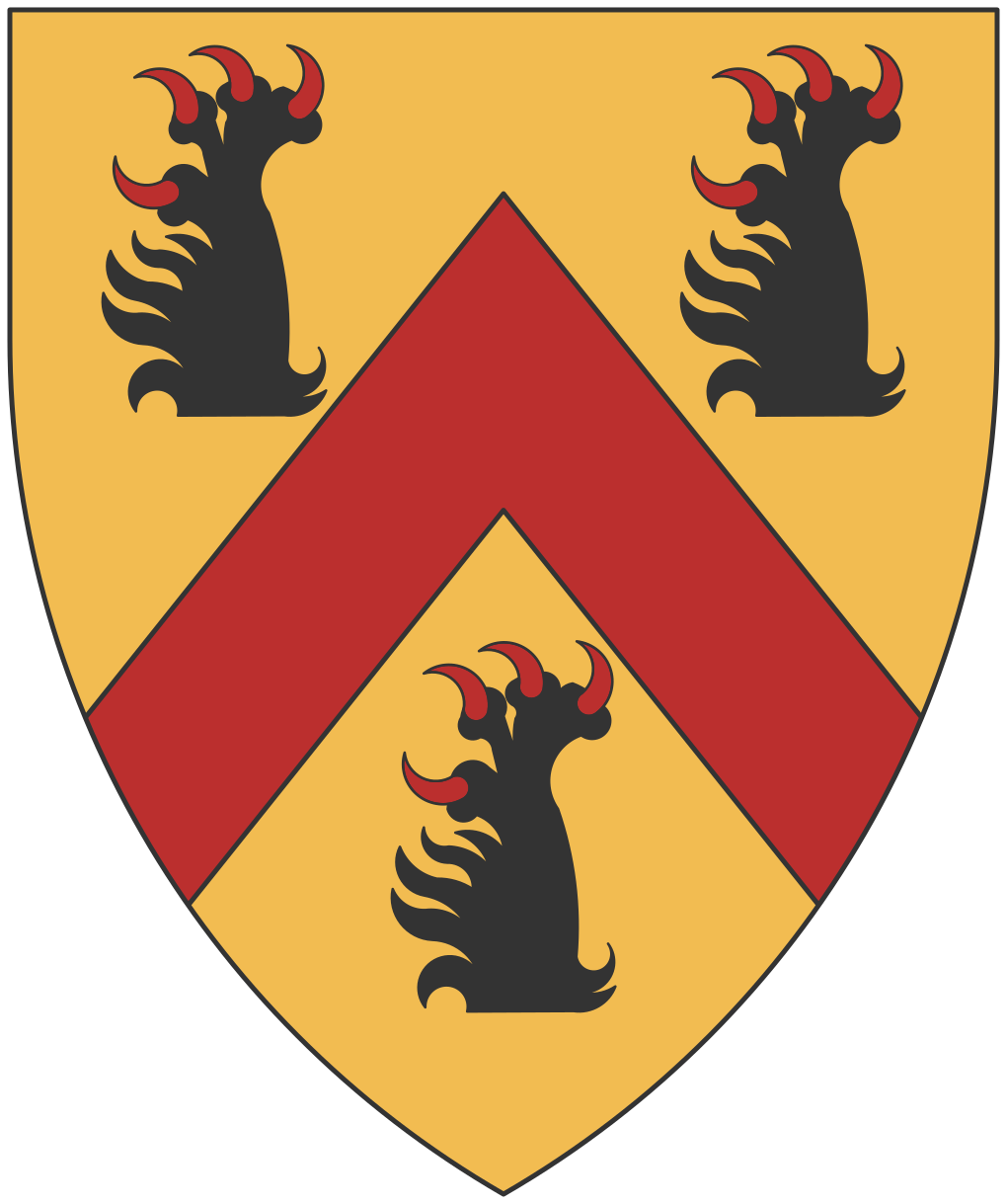
Arms of Austen of Bexley

- Sir Robert Austen, 1st Baronet (c. 1580–1666)
- Sir John Austen, 2nd Baronet (1641–1699)
- Sir Robert Austen, 3rd Baronet (1664–1706)
- Sir Robert Austen, 4th Baronet (1697–1743)
- Sir Sheffield Austen, 5th Baronet (c. 1700–c. 1758)
- Sir Edward Austen, 6th Baronet (c. 1705–1760)
- Sir Robert Austen, 7th Baronet (c. 1708–1772)

== Austen baronets, of Derehams (1714) ==
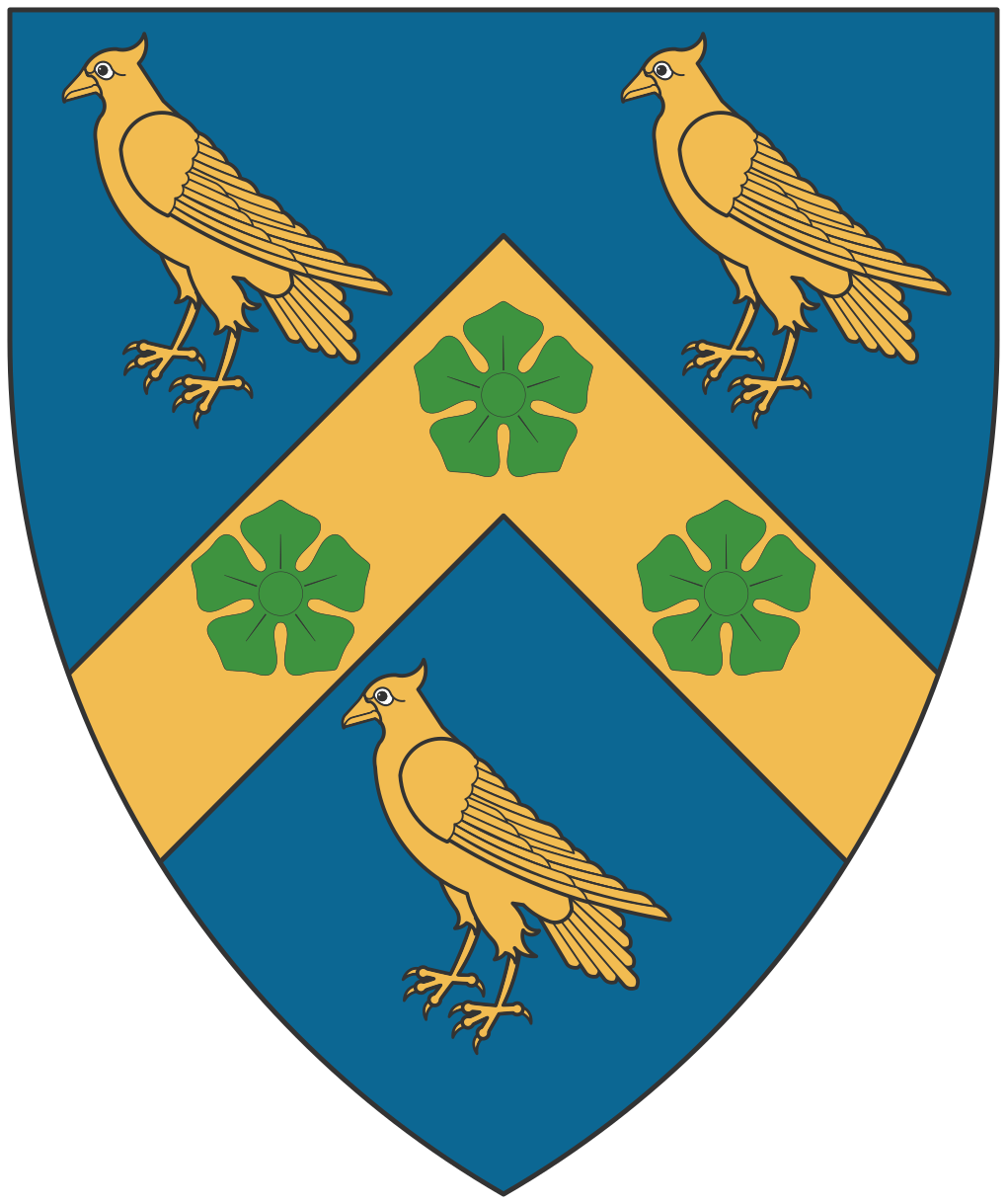
Arms of Austen of Derehams

- Sir John Austen, 1st Baronet (died 1742)
