= Black Prince, Bexley =

Black Prince
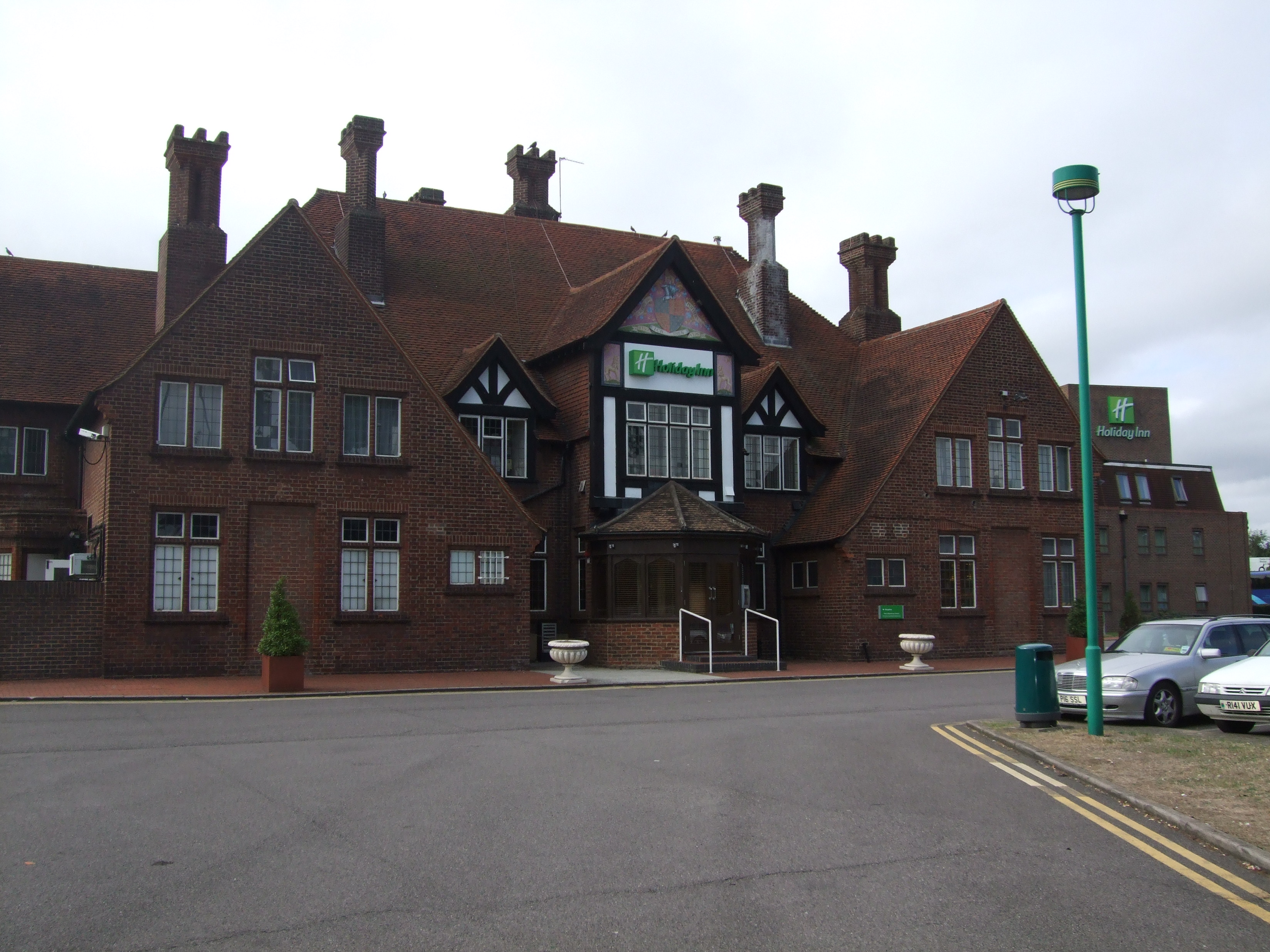
- North (reception) wing, the first part of the building, with the later, larger wing in the background.

- Location within London Black Prince (Greater London)

General information
- Type: Hotel
- Location: London Borough of Bexley, England
- Coordinates: 51°26′47″N 0°9′16″E

The Black Prince is a hotel in the London Borough of Bexley, contained in a landscaped part of the intersection of the A2 dual carriageway. The intersection is for Bexley and much of Bexleyheath. At first it was a public house with function rooms. Its name draws on the local history of Edward, the Black Prince of the fourteenth century and his wife Joan of Kent. It has a secondary, larger, hotel-only wing. The hotel is owned and operated by Holiday Inn, has a restaurant, bar, outdoor seating, meeting rooms and a guests' “gym”.

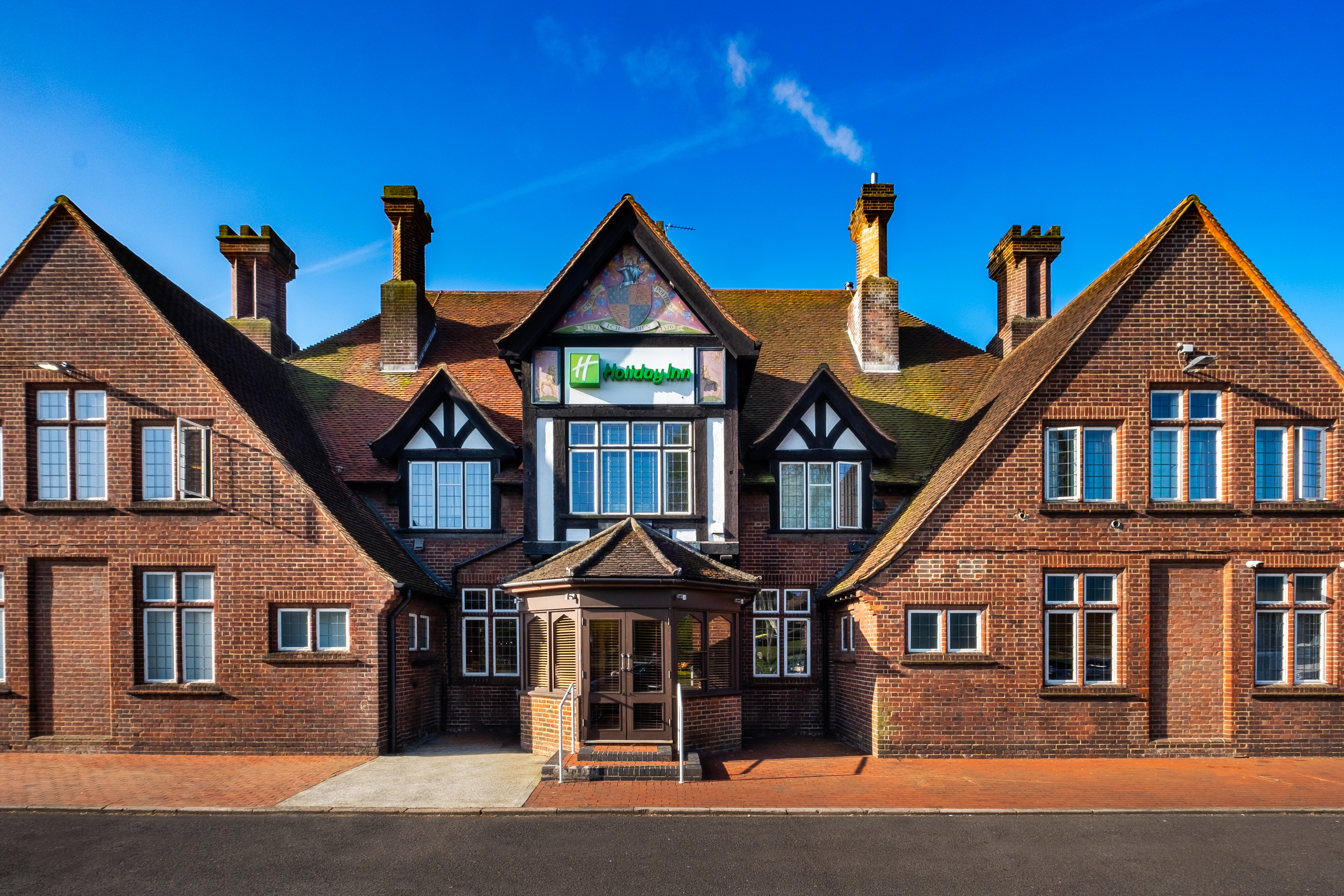
Hotel exterior

== Road junction ==
The A2 dual carriageway has four spurs to two roundabouts for lesser roads which are linked by a long curved bridge. The lesser roads are: the A223 which runs northeast to Crayford and south to Bexley; and the A220 which runs north to Bexleyheath and Erith. On contemporary traffic reports, the junction is known as the Black Prince Interchange.

== Transformation to hotel ==
The tall, two-storey, north, reception-hosting wing has a grand chimneyed, Tudorbethan main façade. It has two mock-beamed wall dormers to recesses flanking a main link dormer; it has octagonal-theme, gabled, geometric style with octagonal porch and the princely arms above. It was a spacious, modern public house/entertainment facility, built by Charringtons in the 1930s as a modest roadhouse. The site is named after Edward, the Black Prince who married Joan of Kent, seized of Chislehurst and other manors. He was a celebrated battle leader in France in the first phase of the Hundred Years' War (1337–1360). Reputedly his ghost haunts the later building or grounds of Hall Place. Edward Heath stayed at the hotel as part of his campaign to become MP for Bexley in the 1950 general election. The later south wing, of three storeys, linked, enlarges the hotel.

In the 1960s and 1970s, the pub was a popular live music venue, and featured appearances from Little Walter, the Graham Bond Organisation, Cream and Genesis. It is alleged that Eric Clapton played his last gig with John Mayall's Bluesbreakers at the venue in 1966. The hotel has hosted the annual Kent International Piano and Keyboard Fair since 2001.

== Local tradition ==
Oral history maintained, as at 1911, Hall Place, across the main road, was a shooting-box for deer of the Black Prince, whose Kent Yeoman fought among others at the Battle of Poitiers. The Att/Atte Hall or Hall family kept occupation of the manor house until 1367 when after seeing "months" of entertaining Edward and his wife Joan of Kent they were forced to sell it.
