= John Essington (MP for New Romney) =

English politician

- In office 1727–1728
- Succeeded by: Robert Austen Robert Furnese

Personal details
- Born: December 8, 1689
- Died: April 8, 1729 (aged 39) Newgate prison

John Essington (1689–1729), of Wandsworth, Surrey, was an English Whig politician who sat in the House of Commons briefly from 1727 to 1728.

Essington was baptized on 8 December 1689, the fourth son of Peter Essington of Wandsworth, a goldsmith of London, and his first wife Elizabeth. He was admitted at Inner Temple in 1706. He married Elizabeth Claphamson of Wandsworth on 10 January 1713. In 1724 he was High Sheriff of Surrey.

Essington was returned as a Whig Member of Parliament for New Romney at the 1727 British general election but was unseated on petition on 29 April 1728.

Essington died on 8 April 1729, in Newgate prison where he was incarcerated for debt. He and his wife had three sons and eight daughters.

Parliament of Great Britain
Preceded by Robert Furnese; David Papillon	Member of Parliament for New Romney; 1727–1728; With: David Papillon	Succeeded by Robert Austen; Robert Furnese
