= William Robinson (priest) =

English priest (died 1642)

The Venerable William Robinson DD (d. 1642) was Archdeacon of Nottingham.

== Family ==
He was the son of John Robinson of Reading, Berkshire and Lucy Webb.

He married Sarah Bainbrigge, daughter of William Bainbrigge of Lockington, Leicestershire. They had the following children:

- John Robinson became 1st Robinson Baronet of London.
- Henry Robinson, rector of Long Whatton.

== Career ==
He was a Fellow of Queens' College, Cambridge from 1590 to 1603 and University Preacher.

He was appointed:

- Prebendary of St David's Cathedral
- Canon of the 5th Prebend of Westminster Abbey 1608 - 1642
- Archdeacon of Nottingham 1635 - 1642
- Rector of Church of St. Mary and All Saints, Bingham 1635 - 1642
- Rector of All Saints Church, Long Whatton

He was buried in All Saints Church, Long Whatton, Leicestershire.
