= John Champneys =

The Right Honourable Sir John Champneys
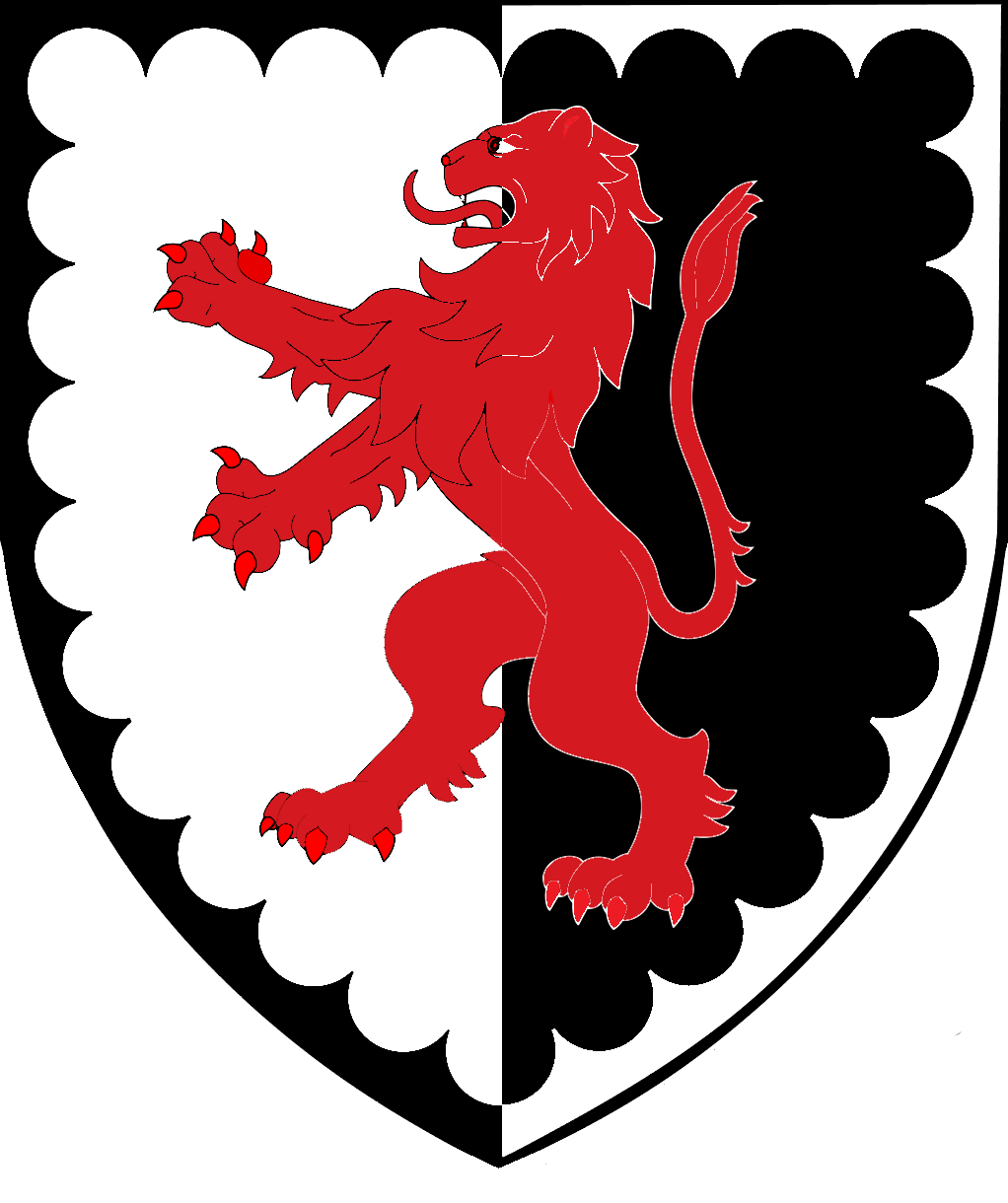
- Coat of Arms of Sir John Champneys. Per pale argent and sable, within a bordure engrailed counterchanged a lion rampant gules.

Lord Mayor of London
- In office 1534–1535
- Monarch: Henry VIII
- Preceded by: Sir Christopher Askew
- Succeeded by: Sir John Alleyn

Sheriff of London
- In office 1522–1523
- Monarch: Henry VIII
- Preceded by: Thomas Pargiter
- Succeeded by: Michael English

Personal details
- Born: 1495
- Died: 3 October 1556 (aged 60–61)
- Resting place: St Mary the Virgin, Bexley, UK; 51.4402°N 0.153729°E
- Spouses: Margaret Murfyn; Meriel Barret
- Children: with Meriel: Francis; Clement; Justinian

Sir John Champneys (1495–1556) was City of London Sheriff in 1522 and Lord Mayor of London in 1534, when he was knighted.

== Life ==
A merchant, Champneys began the building of Hall Place, Bexley, in about 1537. The son of Robert Champneys of Chew Magna, Somerset, he was a member of the Worshipful Company of Skinners. A contemporary chronicler, John Stow, noted that he was blind in later life: a divine judgment for having added "a high tower of brick" to his house in Mincing Lane, "the first that I ever heard of in any private man's house, to overlook his neighbours in this city."

He married twice. His first wife was Margaret (died by 1515), daughter of Thomas Murfyn, and widow of Roger Hall. His second wife was Merial Barret (died 1534) by whom he had three sons:

- Francis
- Clement
- Justinian

He died on 3 October 1556 and was buried on 8 October at St Mary the Virgin, Bexley.

== See also ==
- List of Sheriffs of the City of London
- List of Lord Mayors of London
