= John Lawrence (lord mayor) =

English merchant and Lord Mayor of London

Lord Mayor of London
- In office 1664–1665
- Preceded by: Anthony Bateman
- Succeeded by: Thomas Bloodworth

Personal details
- Born: c. 1621-1628
- Died: 26 January 1691
- Spouse: Abigail Cullen
- Children: 10
- Parents: Abraham Lawrence (father); Mary Lawrence (mother)

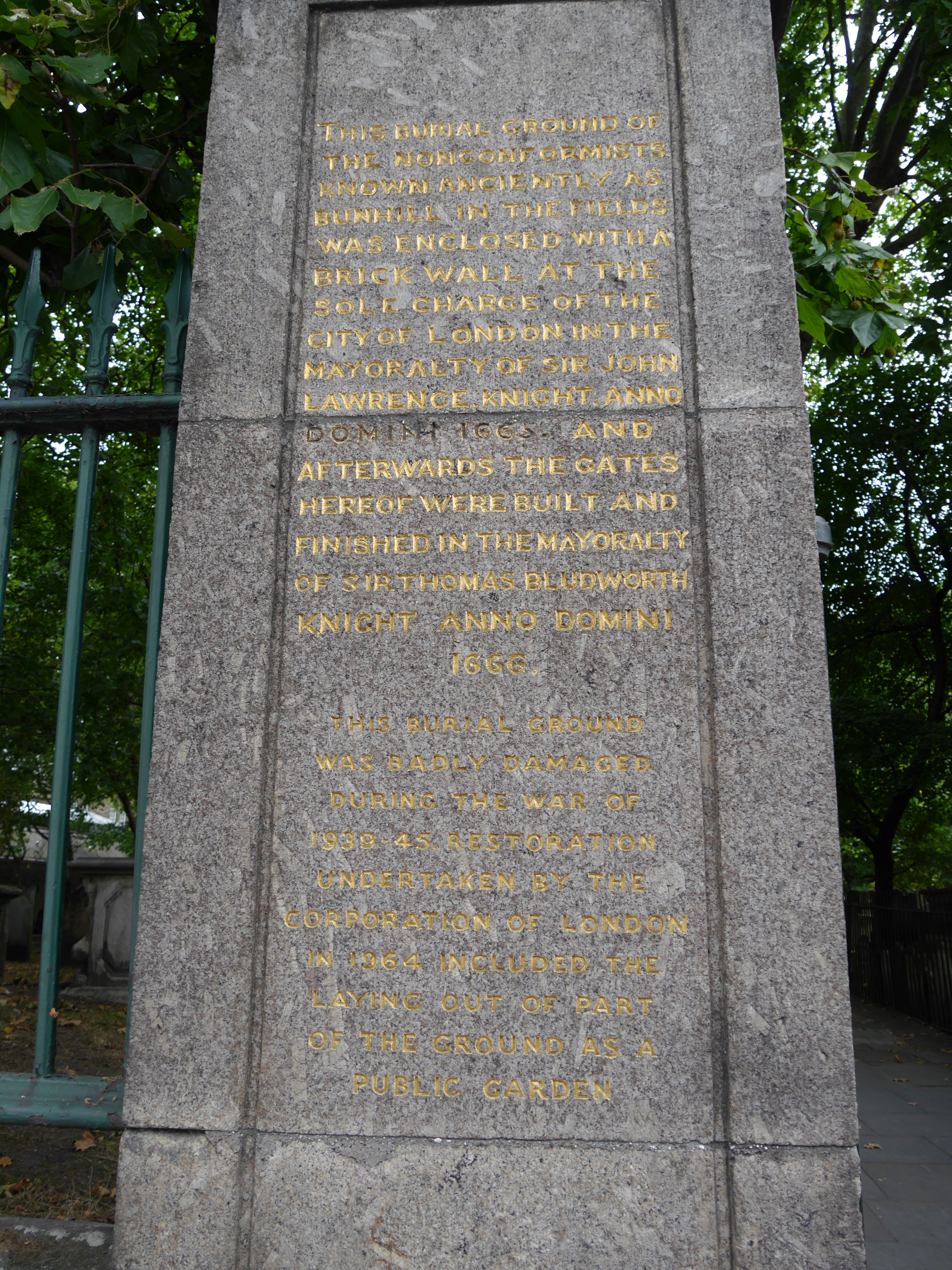
Inscription at the gates of Bunhill Fields burial ground, noting that the ground was first enclosed during John Lawrence's mayoralty

Sir John Lawrence (c. 1621-1628 – 26 January, buried 29 January 1691/2 O.S.) was an English merchant who was Lord Mayor of London from 1664 to 1665. He was therefore Lord Mayor during the period of the Great Plague of London. He was widely acclaimed for his role in mitigating some of the effects of the plague in the city: 'in particular, his efforts in keeping the bread ovens baking and food supplies plentiful earned him considerable praise'.

== Career ==
Sir John Lawrence was a City of London merchant and a member of the Worshipful Company of Haberdashers. In 1658, he was elected an alderman of the City of London for Queenhithe ward. He was one of the Sheriffs of London from 1658 to 1659 and was Master of the Haberdashers Company at the same time. He was a member of the committee of the East India Company in 1659–60, and colonel of the White Regiment from 1659 to 1660. He was knighted on 17 June 1660. In 1664, he was elected 329th Lord Mayor of London and was also Master of the Haberdashers. He was Governor of the Irish Society from 1668 to 1676, and President of St Thomas' Hospital from 1668 to 1683, and again from 1688 until his death in 1692.

Lawrence was one of the leaders who opposed the influence of the court in civic affairs. An account of him written in 1672, said that "he hath put all the affronts and indignities imaginable upon all those persons that have been willing to venture their lives and estates in any military employment for His Majesty" and that he "hath always had three or four busie turbulent followers to crye him up in all parts of the cittie, and to assist him in all popular elections". From 1675 to 1678 he was again a member of the committee of the East India Company, and in 1677 Master of the Haberdashers Company. He served twice more on the committee of the E.I.C. from 1679 to 1680 and from 1681 to 1683. He interrupted his period as alderman in 1683 but was re-elected for Queenhithe in 1688, and he continued as alderman until his death. He was Governor of the Irish Society again from 1690 to 1692. He was elected a Fellow of the Royal Society in 1673. Sir John held £1,600 of stock in the first Royal African Company, but he was not on the list of shareholders of the New Royal African Company when it was chartered in 1672.

Sir John Lawrence's arms were "argent, a cross, raguly gules, a canton ermine", granted in 1664 or possibly earlier.

== Family ==
John Lawrence was born to Abraham Lawrence, a weaver, and Mary Lawrence, at some date between 1621 (when his parents were married) and 1628 (20 years before the birth of his first child). He had two brothers, James and Abraham, and one sister, Hanna (born 7 December 1628)

Sir John Lawrence married Abigail Cullen, afterward Dame Abigail Lawrence (b. 1623, d. 6 June 1682) and they had ten children—nine girls who lived to adulthood and one boy who died as a child:

1. Abigail, b. 4 May 1648, married Sir George Vyner, 2nd Baronet, son of Sir Thomas Vyner (Lord Mayor from 1653 to 1654)
2. Mary, b. 4 May 1648, married John Pollexfen of St Stephen Walbrook, 10 May 1670
3. Hester, b. 21 October 1649, married Thomas Preslley, gent. 25 May 1669
4. Rachael, b. 8 May 1651, married Charles Chamberlain (Alderman from 1687 to 1688), 22 April 1673
5. Gartred (Gertrude), b. 11 April 1653, married Richard Peacocke, Esq. of Finchley, 27 February 1678
6. Elizabeth, b. 14 November 1654
7. Susanah, b. 6 November 1656, d. 18 December 1656
8. Rebecca, b. 8 July 1658
9. [unknown daughter]
10. [unknown son, died young]

The burial monument for Dame Abigail Lawrence at St Helen's Church, Bishopsgate has the following inscription

"the tender Mother of ten Children // the nine first being all daughters // shee suckled at her owne breasts // they all lived to be of age // her last a son died an Infant // Shee lived a married wife thirty nine years // three and twenty whereof // Shee was an Exemplary matron of this Cittie”.

Sir John married a second time on 24 May 1684 to Catherine Stone, of St Giles (Cripplegate?), "about 34, Spinster, at her own disposal". Catherine Stone was daughter of Sir Robert Stone and his second wife Elizabeth. In about 1684 they moved from London to Putney, Surrey where they owned a large house (thirty-one hearths). According to Dame Catherine's will and parish church records, they had four children:

1. John Lawrence, Esq., b. ??
2. Catherine Lawrence, b. ??
3. Dorothy Lawrence, baptized 31 October 1688, St Mary, Putney, Wandsworth, Surrey
4. Adam Lawrence, baptized 13 March 1689/90, St Mary, Putney, Wandsworth, Surrey

Sir John Lawrence was buried 29 January 1691/2 O.S. at St Helen's Church, Bishopsgate. His Inventory was rendered in 1694. Dame Catherine Lawrence nee Stone was buried 22 April 1723 at St Helen's Church, Bishopsgate in the family vault.

Civic offices
| Preceded by Anthony Bateman | Lord Mayor of the City of London; 1664-1665 | Succeeded by Thomas Bloodworth |
