= Anthony Bateman =

English merchant

Lord Mayor of London
- In office 1663–1664
- Preceded by: Sir John Robinson, 1st Baronet, of London
- Succeeded by: Sir John Lawrence

Personal details
- Died: 1687
- Parents: Robert Bateman (father); Elizabeth Westrow (mother)

Sir Anthony Bateman (died 1687) was an English merchant who was Lord Mayor of London in 1663.

== Biography ==
Bateman was the son of Robert Bateman, chamberlain of the city. He was a city of London merchant and a member of the Worshipful Company of Skinners. From 1645 to 1646 he was one of the Court Assistants to the Levant Company, and from 1645 to 1649 was a member of the committee of the East India Company. He was one of the committee of the E.I.C. from 1650 to 1658, and one of the Court Assistants to the Levant Company from 1651 to 1652 and from 1653 to 1656. In 1657 he was elected an alderman of the City of London for Farringdon Without ward. He was one of the Sheriffs of London in 1658 and was one of the Court Assistants of the Levant Company from 1658 to 1659. In 1659 he was Master of the Worshipful Company of Skinners. He was on the committee of the E.I.C. from 1659 to 1660 and colonel of Red Regiment from 1659 to 1667. He was knighted on 26 May 1660. He was a member of the committee of the E.I.C. from 1661 to 1663. In 1663, he was elected Lord Mayor of London.

Bateman later failed in business and was a prisoner in the King's Bench on 2 July 1675 when he was voted a pension of 30 shillings per week.

Bateman died in 1687 and was buried on 2 July 1687.

Civic offices
Preceded by Sir John Robinson, 1st Baronet, of London	Lord Mayor of the City of London; 1663	Succeeded by Sir John Lawrence
