= St Bernard's College, Oxford =

College of the University of Oxford

St Bernard's College
- Oxford
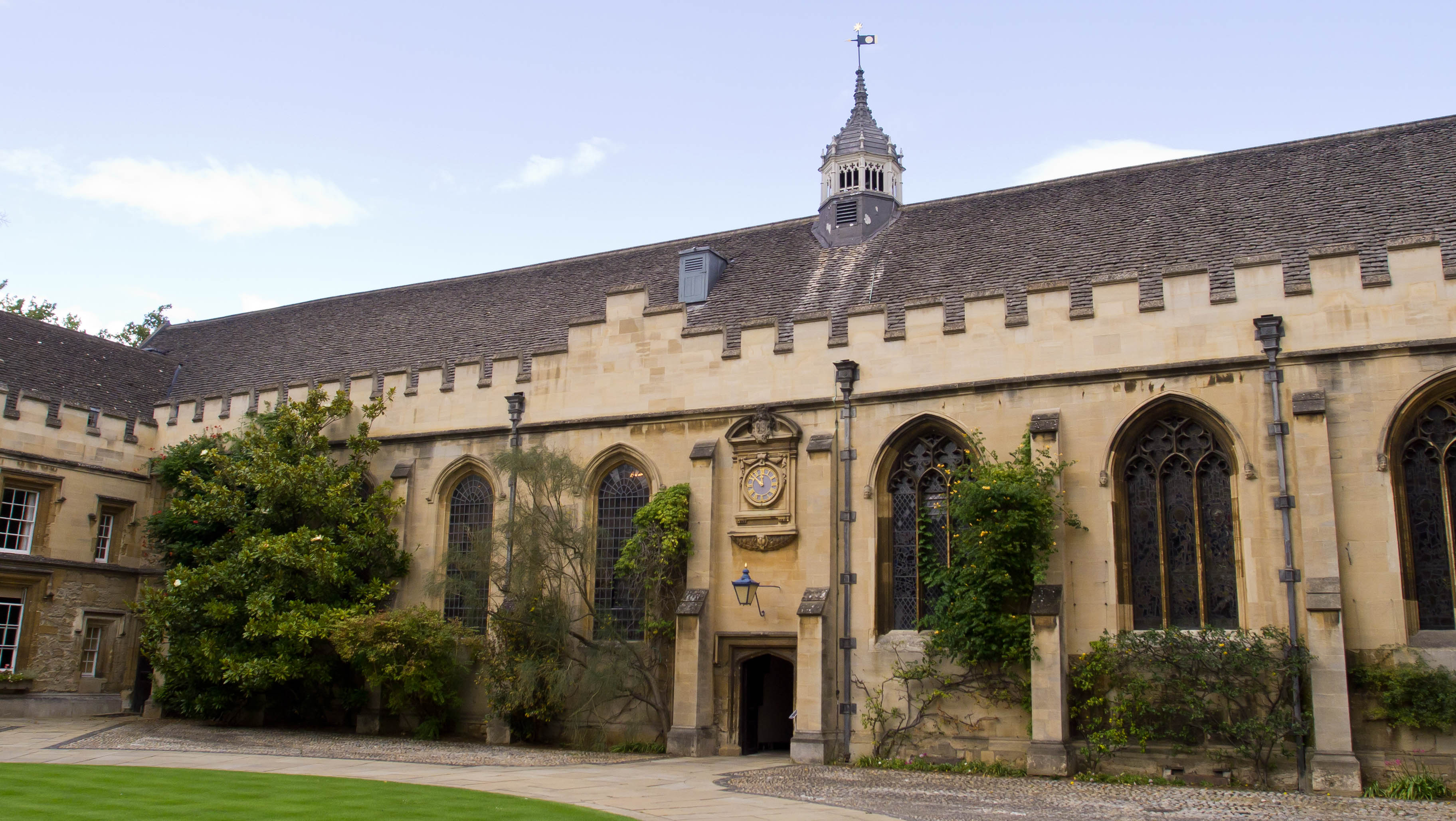
- Surviving buildings in the Front Quad of St John's College
- Location: St Giles, Oxford OX1 3JP, UK
- Coordinates: 51.75612°N 1.258605°W
- Established: 1437; 589 years ago
- Closed: 1540; 486 years ago
- Named for: Bernard of Clairvaux

Map
- Location within Oxford city centre

St Bernard's College was a constituent college of the University of Oxford. Founded by the Cistercian order in 1437 and dedicated to Bernard of Clairvaux, it was suppressed in Spring 1540 during the dissolution of the monasteries. Its buildings were later used to found St John's College, Oxford.

== History ==
The College of St Bernard, a monastery and house of study of the Cistercian order, was founded in 1437. It was founded by Henry Chichele, Archbishop of Canterbury, under licence in mortmain for Cistercian monks, on the model of Gloucester Hall and Durham College for the southern and northern Benedictines. Nothing more than a site and building was required by way of endowment, as the student monks, who were sent there to study under a provisor, were supported by the houses of the order to which they belonged. The site was five acres, and the building is described in the letters patent "as a fitting and noble college mansion in honour of the most glorious Virgin Mary and St Bernard in Northgates Street outside the Northgate of Oxford". It was suppressed with the Cistercian abbeys during the dissolution of the monasteries, and, on 11 December 1546, granted to Christ Church, Oxford, which sold it to Thomas White in 1554 for St John's College.

Construction of the college quadrangle started in 1437. When the site passed to the crown in 1540, the Eastern range, which was to be a library with chambers below, was nearly complete but lacked its roof. The quadrangle of St Bernard's would accommodate 50 students.

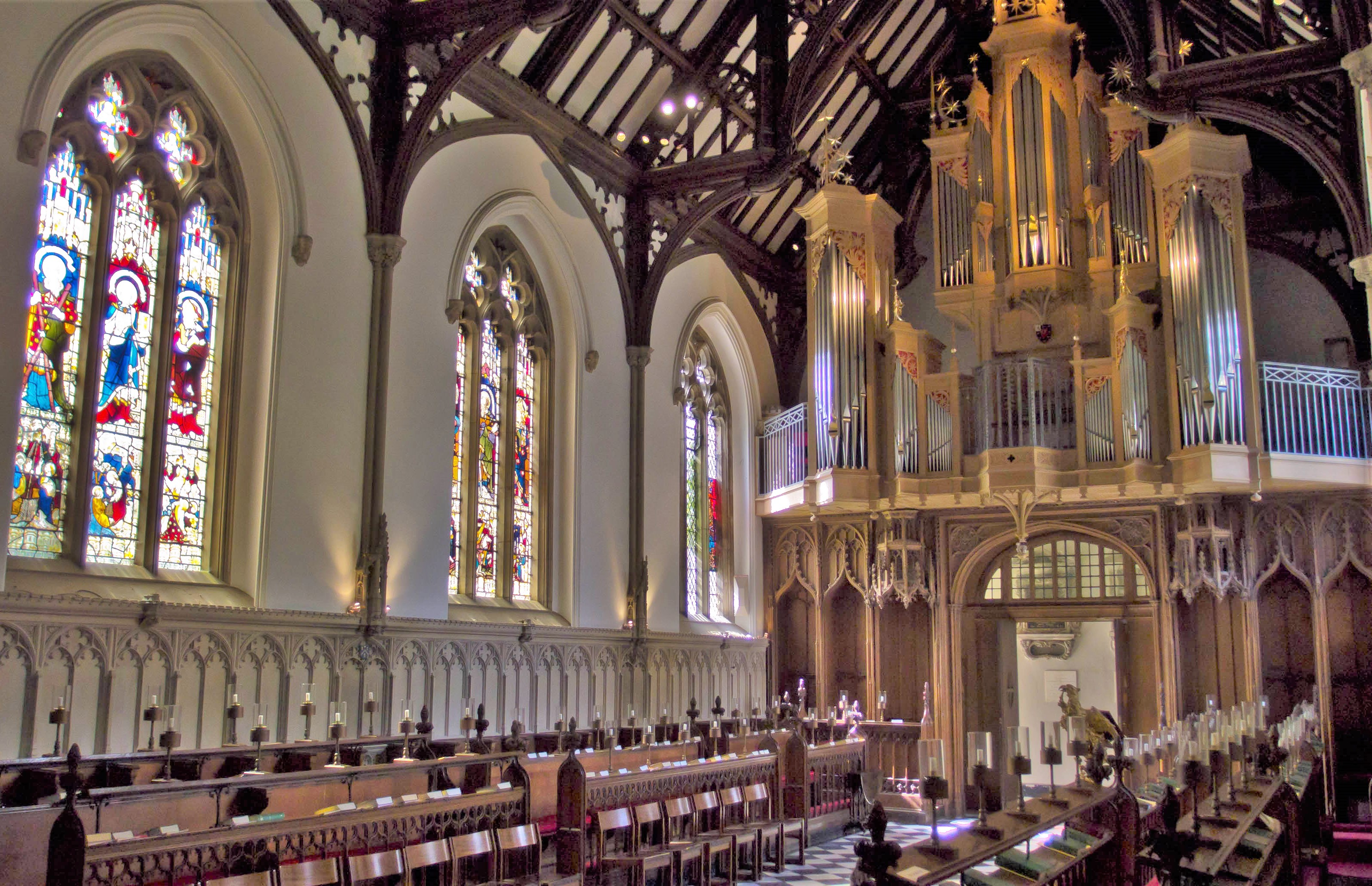
Chapel interior of St John's College, Oxford

The chapel was built and dedicated to St Bernard of Clairvaux in 1530. It survives, rededicated to St John the Baptist, as the chapel of St John's College.

== Alumni ==
- Gabriel Donne (died 1558), Abbot of Buckfast Abbey
- Thomas Skevington (died 1533), Bishop of Bangor
