= Sir Robert Austen, 4th Baronet =

British politician

Sir Robert Austen, 4th Baronet (6 October 1697 – 7 October 1743), of Hall Place, Bexley, Kent, was an English politician who sat in the House of Commons in two periods between 1728 and 1741.

Austen was the son of Sir Robert Austen, 3rd Baronet and his wife Elizabeth Stawell, daughter of George Stawell of Cothelstone Somerset. He succeeded to the title of 4th Baronet Austen of Hall Place in Bexley, Kent upon the death of his father on 5 July 1706 . He matriculated at Oriel College, Oxford in 1715. He was High Sheriff of Kent in 1724.

Austen was seated on petition as Member of Parliament (MP) for New Romney, Kent on 29 April 1728 after being defeated in the poll at the 1727 British general election. He voted with the Opposition on the civil list, the Hessians, and the army, but voted for the excise bill, and abstained on the repeal of the Septennial Act. He was defeated at the 1734 British general election, but was returned for New Romney at a by-election on 10 February 1736. He did not vote on the Spanish convention in 1739 nor on the place bill in 1740, and appears in a ministerial list of absent opposition Members on 21 November 1739. He married Rachael Dashwood, daughter of Sir Francis Dashwood, 1st Baronet on 4 November 1738. He stood down at New Romney at the 1741 British general election in favour of his brother-in-law, Sir Francis Dashwood.

Austen died without issue aged 46 on 7 October 1743, and was buried in Churchdown, Gloucestershire. He was succeeded in the baronetcy by his brother Sir Sheffield Austen, and was so much in debt that his estates went into Chancery.

Parliament of Great Britain
Preceded by John Essington; David Papillon	Member of Parliament for New Romney; 1728–1734; With: Robert Furnese (April–May 1728); David Papillon May 1728–1734	Succeeded by David Papillon; Stephen Bisse
Preceded by Stephen Bisse; David Papillon	Member of Parliament for New Romney; 1736–1741; With: Stephen Bisse	Succeeded by Henry Furnese; Sir Francis Dashwood, Bt
Baronetage of England
Preceded by Robert Austen	Baronet (of Bexley); 1706–1743	Succeeded by Sheffield Austen
