= James Nichols (printer) =

English printer and theological writer

James Nichols (1785–1861) was an English printer and theological writer.

== Life ==
He was born at Washington, Durham, 6 April 1785. Because of family financial troubles he had to work in a factory at Holbeck, Leeds, from the age of eight to twelve, but also studied Latin grammar. His father was later able to send him to Leeds Grammar School. Nichols was for some time a private tutor, and then entered into business as a printer and bookseller at Briggate, Leeds.

Nichols died in Hoxton Square on 26 November 1861. He married Miss Bursey of Stockton-on-Tees in 1813, and had many children, of whom two survived.

== Works ==
Nichols printed some small volumes, including John Byrom's Poems (1814), and pamphlets, and edited the Leeds Literary Observer vol. i., from January to September 1819. This periodical he wanted to replace by a more ambitious monthly miscellany; but in the event he moved to London and opened a printing office at 2 Warwick Square, Newgate Street. His best-known work Calvinism and Arminianism compared (1824), was written and printed there. He also printed The Journal of John Wesley 1735-1737/8 Volume 1 entered at Stationers hall.

In 1825 there was published the first volume of his translation of the Works of Jacobus Arminius, with a life and appendices, which met with the approval of Abraham des Amorie van der Hoeven. The third volume, issued in 1875, was translated by William Nichols. Nichols moved his printing office in 1832 to Hoxton Square, where he remained the rest of his life. Here he printed editions of Thomas Fuller's Church History (1837), History of Cambridge (1840), and The Holy and Profane State (1841), Pearson on the Creed (1845 and 1848), and William Warburton's Divine Legation (1846), and edited books for William Tegg. The Poetical Works of James Thomson (1849) and the Complete Works of Dr. Young (1855) were recognised as scholarly. His most substantial publication was of the Morning Exercises: The Morning Exercises at Cripplegate, St. Giles-in-the-Fields, and in Southwark, being divers Sermons preached A.D. 1659–1689, fifth edition, collated and corrected, London, 1844–5, 6 vols.

He was on good terms with Robert Southey, George Tomline, William Wordsworth, Henry John Todd, John Bowring, and other scholars.
