= Thomas Murfyn =

Sheriff and Lord Mayor of London (d. 1523)

The Right Honourable Thomas Murfyn
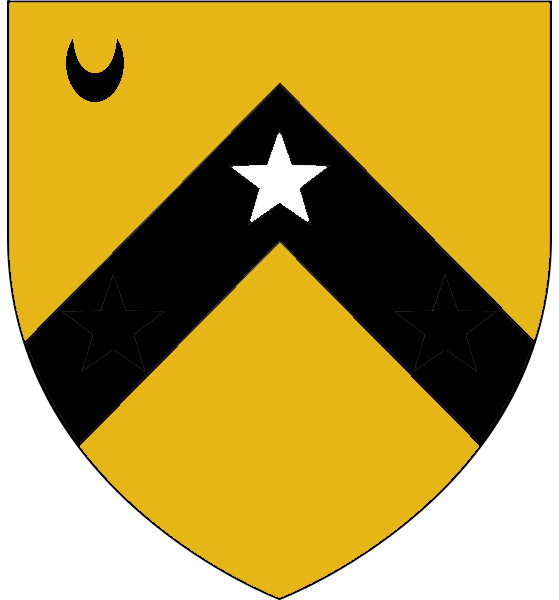
- Coat of Arms of Thomas Murfyn: Or on a chevron sable a mullet argent. A crescent sable in the dexter chief.

Lord Mayor of London
- In office 1518–1519
- Monarch: Henry VIII
- Preceded by: Sir Thomas Exmewe
- Succeeded by: Sir James Yarford

Sheriff of London
- In office 1511–1512
- Preceded by: John Rest
- Succeeded by: John Brydges

Personal details
- Born: Ely, Cambridgeshire
- Died: After 2 September 1523 London, UK
- Resting place: Old St Paul's Cathedral, London, UK; 51.513611°N 0.098333°W
- Spouses: Alice Marshall; Elizabeth Donne
- Children: Edward; George; Margaret; Mary; Frances; 9 more

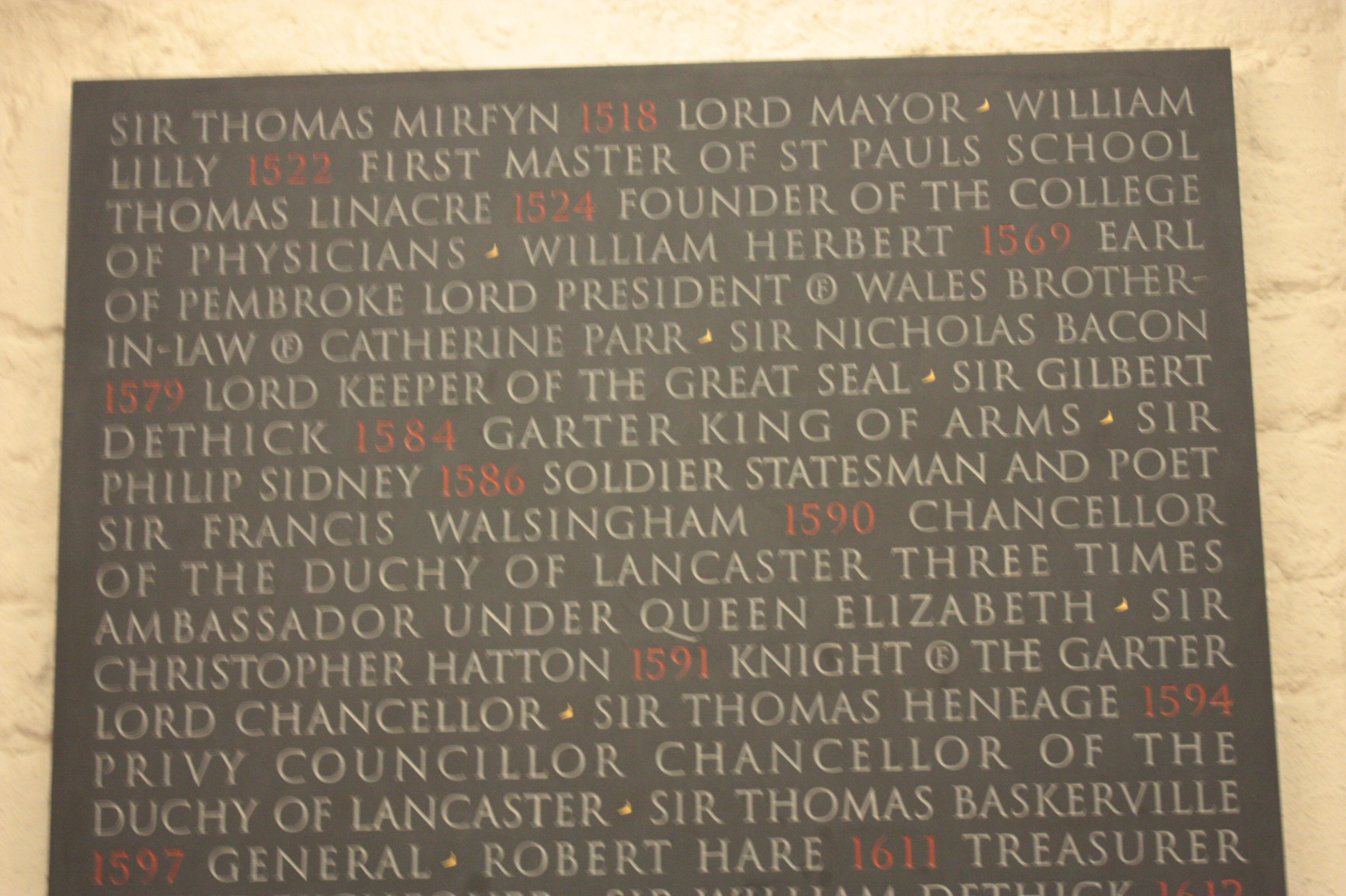
Mirfyn's name appears on the Memorial to the graves lost in the Great Fire of London, St Paul's Cathedral

Thomas Murfyn (or Mirfyn), (died after 2 September 1523) was a Sheriff and Lord Mayor of London.

== Biography ==
Thomas Murfyn was a native of Ely, Cambridgeshire, and son of George Murfyn. He was a member of the Worshipful Company of Skinners in the City of London, who served as Sheriff of London from 1511 to 1512, and as Lord Mayor of London from 1518 to 1519.

Mark Noble claimed that Murfyn was probably not knighted until after his election to the mayoralty. Although Murfyn is often referred to in later documents as Sir Thomas Murfyn, there appears to be no record of his knighthood. It became common practice after Thomas Muryfn's mayoralty for Lord Mayors of London to be knighted and this may be one reason why later documents refer to him as "Sir". The misunderstanding may also be due to the translation of the form of address "Dominus" (a term of courtesy used in reference to an official) as "Sir". In his will, which was made on 2 September 1523 and proved in London on 15 October 1523, Murfyn refers to himself as "Thomas Mirfyn citizein and Alderman of the citie of London". The memorial to the graves lost in the Great Fire of London at St Paul's Cathedral, which lists "Sir Thomas Miryfn", may be perpetuating this error rather than evidence of a knighthood.

Murfyn died shortly after he made his will; he was buried in the chapel upon the Charnel house, a building on the North side of the churchyard of Old St Paul's Cathedral.

== Family ==
Thomas married firstly, Alice Marshall, by whom he had thirteen children:

- Thomas
- John
- George, who became a monk
- Thomas
- John
- Frances
- Richard
- John
- Robert
- Edward (d. 1528), a wealthy London merchant who married Alice (d. 1560), widow of John Brigandine of Southampton, and daughter of Oliver Squier of Southby, Hampshire, by whom there were no surviving children. Alice subsequently married, circa 1528, Edward North.
- Bartholomew
- Margaret, who married a Lord Mayor of London, Sir John Champneys.
- Mary, who married, by 1523, another Lord Mayor of London, Sir Andrew Judde.

He married secondly, sometime after 15 October 1519, Elizabeth, only daughter and heiress of Sir Angel Donne. alderman of London, and Anne Hawardine, of Cheshire. By Elizabeth, he had a daughter:

- Frances (c.1520/1–c.1543), who married Thomas Cromwell's nephew, Sir Richard Cromwell by 8 March 1534.

His last wife survived him and subsequently married, in 1524, Sir Thomas Denys by whom she had a son, Sir Robert Denys. Sir Robert married Mary, daughter of William Blount, 4th Baron Mountjoy, by whom he had a son, Thomas Denys.

The arms of the Murfyns were, Or on a chevron sable a mullet argent; those of Donne, Azure semée of cross-crosslets or, a unicorn salient argent.

Murfyn is listed as one of the graves lost in the Great Fire of London in 1666, on a monument in the crypt of St Paul's Cathedral, together with several other Lord Mayors.

== See also ==
- List of Sheriffs of the City of London
- List of Lord Mayors of London
