= Thomas Frewen (MP) =

17th-century English politician

Thomas Frewen (1630–1702), of Cleybrooke House, Fulham, Middlesex, St. James's, Westminster and Brickwall House, Northiam, Sussex, was a Member of Parliament for Rye in March 1679 – 1685, 15 January – 1 April 1689, and 9 February 1694 – 1698.
