= Joseph Offley =

English Member of Parliament

Member of Parliament for Rye
- In office 1698 – 19 December 1702

Personal details
- Died: 1721

Joseph Offley (died 1721), of the Middle Temple, London, was an English Member of Parliament. He was a Member (MP) of the Parliament of England for Rye 1698 to 19 December 1702.
