= Grafham, Cambridgeshire =

Village in Cambridgeshire, England

Coordinates: 52.3°N 0.283°W

Grafham
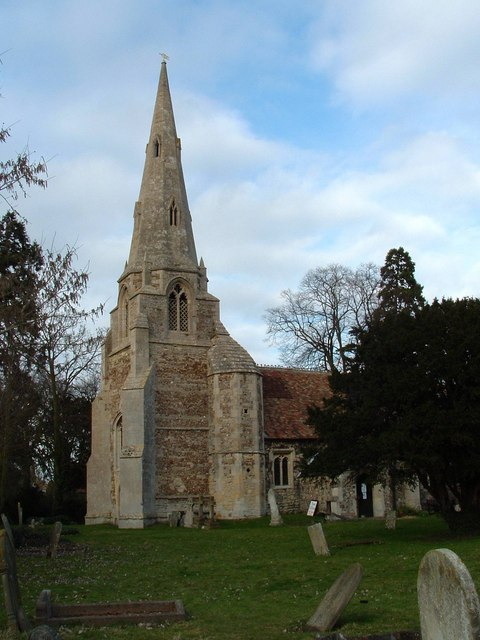
- Grafham Parish Church

- Location within Cambridgeshire
- Population: 630 (2011)
- OS grid reference: TL170683
- District: Huntingdonshire
- Shire county: Cambridgeshire
- Region: East
- Country: England
- Sovereign state: United Kingdom
- Post town: Huntingdon
- Postcode district: PE28
- Dialling code: 01480
- Police: Cambridgeshire
- Fire: Cambridgeshire
- Ambulance: East of England
- UK Parliament: Huntingdon
- Website: http://www.grafham.org.uk

Grafham is a village and civil parish in Cambridgeshire, England. The village lies approximately 5 miles (8 km) south-west of Huntingdon. Grafham is situated within Huntingdonshire which is a non-metropolitan district of Cambridgeshire as well as being a historic county of England. The village gives its name to the nearby reservoir, Grafham Water. The village recently successfully raised funds as a community venture and via external funding sources to open a community convenience store located in the grounds of the village hall.

== History ==
In 1085 William the Conqueror ordered that a survey should be carried out across his kingdom to discover who owned which parts and what it was worth. The survey took place in 1086 and the results were recorded in what, since the 12th century, has become known as the Domesday Book. Starting with the king himself, for each landholder within a county there is a list of their estates or manors; and, for each manor, there is a summary of the resources of the manor, the amount of annual rent that was collected by the lord of the manor both in 1066 and in 1086, together with the taxable value.

Grafham was listed in the Domesday Book in the Hundred of Leightonstone in Huntingdonshire; the name of the settlement was written as Grafham in the Domesday Book. In 1086 there were two manors at Grafham; the annual rent paid to the lords of the manors in 1066 had been £5 and the rent was the same in 1086.

The Domesday Book does not explicitly detail the population of a place but it records that there were 24 households at Grafham. There is no consensus about the average size of a household at that time; estimates range from 3.5 to 5.0 people per household. Using these figures then an estimate of the population of Grafham in 1086 is that it was within the range of 84 and 120 people.

The Domesday Book uses a number of units of measure for areas of land that are now unfamiliar terms, such as hides and ploughlands. In different parts of the country, these were terms for the area of land that a team of eight oxen could plough in a single season and are equivalent to 120 acres (49 hectares); this was the amount of land that was considered to be sufficient to support a single family. By 1086, the hide had become a unit of tax assessment rather than an actual land area; a hide was the amount of land that could be assessed as £1 for tax purposes. The survey records that there were 6.75 ploughlands at Grafham in 1086 and that there was the capacity for a further two ploughlands. In addition to the arable land, there was 6 acres (2 hectares) of meadows and 3,784 acres (1,531 hectares) of woodland at Grafham.

The tax assessment in the Domesday Book was known as geld or danegeld and was a type of land-tax based on the hide or ploughland. It was originally a way of collecting a tribute to pay off the Danes when they attacked England, and was only levied when necessary. Following the Norman conquest, the geld was used to raise money for the king and to pay for continental wars; by 1130, the geld was being collected annually. Having determined the value of a manor's land and other assets, a tax of so many shillings and pence per pound of value would be levied on the land holder. While this was typically two shillings in the pound the amount did vary; for example, in 1084 it was as high as six shillings in the pound. For the manors at Grafham the total tax assessed was 5.5 geld.

In 1086 there was no parish church at Grafham.

== Government ==
As a civil parish, Grafham has a parish council. The parish council is elected by the residents of the parish who have registered on the electoral roll; the parish council is the lowest tier of government in England. A parish council is responsible for providing and maintaining a variety of local services including allotments and a cemetery; grass cutting and tree planting within public open spaces such as a village green or playing fields. The parish council reviews all planning applications that might affect the parish and makes recommendations to Huntingdonshire District Council, which is the local planning authority for the parish. The parish council also represents the views of the parish on issues such as local transport, policing and the environment. The parish council raises its own tax to pay for these services, known as the parish precept, which is collected as part of the Council Tax. The parish council has six councillors and normally meets on the third Tuesday of a month.

Grafham was in the historic and administrative county of Huntingdonshire until 1965. From 1965, the village was part of the new administrative county of Huntingdon and Peterborough. Then in 1974, following the Local Government Act 1972, Grafham became a part of the county of Cambridgeshire.

The second tier of local government is Huntingdonshire District Council which is a non-metropolitan district of Cambridgeshire and has its headquarters in Huntingdon. Huntingdonshire District Council has 52 councillors representing 29 district wards. Huntingdonshire District Council collects the council tax, and provides services such as building regulations, local planning, environmental health, leisure and tourism. Grafham is a part of the district ward of Brampton and is represented on the district council by two councillors. District councillors serve for four-year terms following elections to Huntingdonshire District Council.

For Grafham the highest tier of local government is Cambridgeshire County Council which has administration buildings in Cambridge. The county council provides county-wide services such as major road infrastructure, fire and rescue, education, social services, libraries and heritage services. Cambridgeshire County Council consists of 69 councillors representing 60 electoral divisions. Grafham is part of the electoral division of Brampton and Kimbolton and is represented on the county council by one councillor.

At Westminster Grafham is in the parliamentary constituency of Huntingdon, and elects one Member of Parliament (MP) by the first past the post system of election. Grafham is represented in the House of Commons by Jonathan Djanogly (Conservative). Jonathan Djanogly has represented the constituency since 2001. The previous member of parliament was John Major (Conservative) who represented the constituency between 1983 and 2001.

== Demography ==
=== Population ===
In the period 1801 to 1901 the population of Grafham was recorded every ten years by the UK census. During this time the population was in the range of 176 (the lowest was in 1801) and 344 (the highest was in 1871).

From 1901, a census was taken every ten years with the exception of 1941 (due to the Second World War).

| Parish | 1911 | 1921 | 1931 | 1951 | 1961 | 1971 | 1981 | 1991 | 2001 | 2011 |
|---|---|---|---|---|---|---|---|---|---|---|
| Grafham | 223 | 201 | 200 | 201 | 184 | 190 | 374 | 445 | 585 | 630 |

All population census figures from report Historic Census figures Cambridgeshire to 2011 by Cambridgeshire Insight.

In 2011, the parish covered an area of 1,801 acres (729 hectares) and so the population density for Grafham in 2011 was 223.9 persons per square mile (86.4 per square kilometre).
