= Robert Dennis =

Robert Dennis may refer to:

- Robert Dennis (MP) (died 1592), English member of parliament for Devon in 1555
- Robert B. Dennis (1819–1884), American politician from Ohio
- Robert C. Dennis (1915–1983), Canadian born mystery fiction author radio and television series screenwriter
- Robert H. Dennis (c. 1846–1900), member of the Florida House of Representatives
- Robert J. Dennis, American businessman
- Robert Dennis (sprinter) (born 1975), Liberian sprinter
