= Robert Dennis (MP) =

English politician

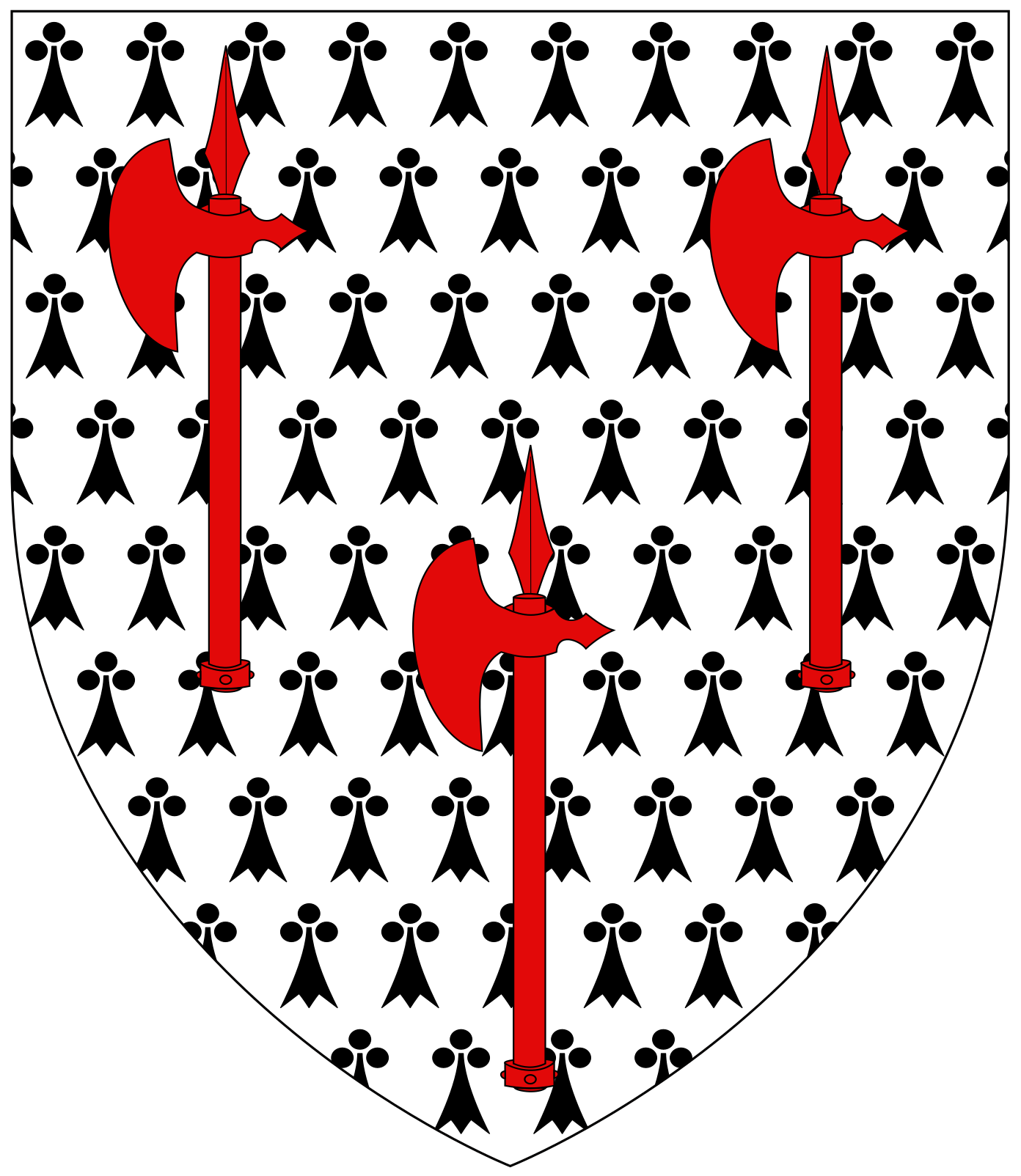
Arms of Denys of Holcombe Burnell: Ermine, three battle-axes gules

Sir Robert Dennis, JP (died 1592) of Holcombe Burnell in Devon, was a Member of Parliament for Devon in 1555 and served as Sheriff of Devon.

== Personal life ==
Robert Dennis was the eldest son of Sir Thomas Denys (c. 1477 – 1561) of Holcombe Burnell, Sheriff of Devon nine times between 1507/8 to 1553/4 and Member of Parliament for Devon who acquired large estates in Devon at the Dissolution of the Monasteries. In 1577 he was commissioned as one of two Colonels of the East Division of the Devon Trained Bands. His mother (his father's second wife) was Elizabeth Donne, a daughter of Sir Angel Donne, an Alderman of London, by his wife Anne Hawarden (alias Hawardine), of Cheshire, and widow of Thomas Murfyn, Lord Mayor of London.

Dennis married twice. His first marriage was some time before 4 April 1552 to Mary Blount, the second daughter of William Blount, 4th Baron Mountjoy, and first cousin to Lady Jane Grey, the Nine Day Queen of England. (Note: Lady Jane Grey's father Henry Grey, Duke of Suffolk was the brother of Dorothy Grey, wife of William Blount, 4th Baron Mountjoy and mother of Mary Blount (See pedigree in Vivian, p. 102)) Their children were:

- Anne Dennis, wife of Sir John Chichester (died 1586) of Raleigh in the parish of Pilton, North Devon, Sheriff of Devon in 1585 and elder brother of Edward Chichester, 1st Viscount Chichester, of Eggesford, Devon. Her grandson was Sir John Chichester, 1st Baronet (died 1667).
- Gertrude Dennis, who married firstly (as his second wife) John Arundell (died 1580) of Trerice, Cornwall, Member of Parliament for Mitchell, Cornwall, in 1555 and 1558, and High Sheriff of Cornwall in 1573–1574. She married secondly Edward Parker, 12th Baron Morley (c. 1550 – 1618) of Norfolk.

His second marriage, at some time before 12 October 1555, was to Margaret Godolphin, a daughter and co-heiress of Sir William Godolphin of Godolphin in Cornwall. By her he had three sons and five daughters including:

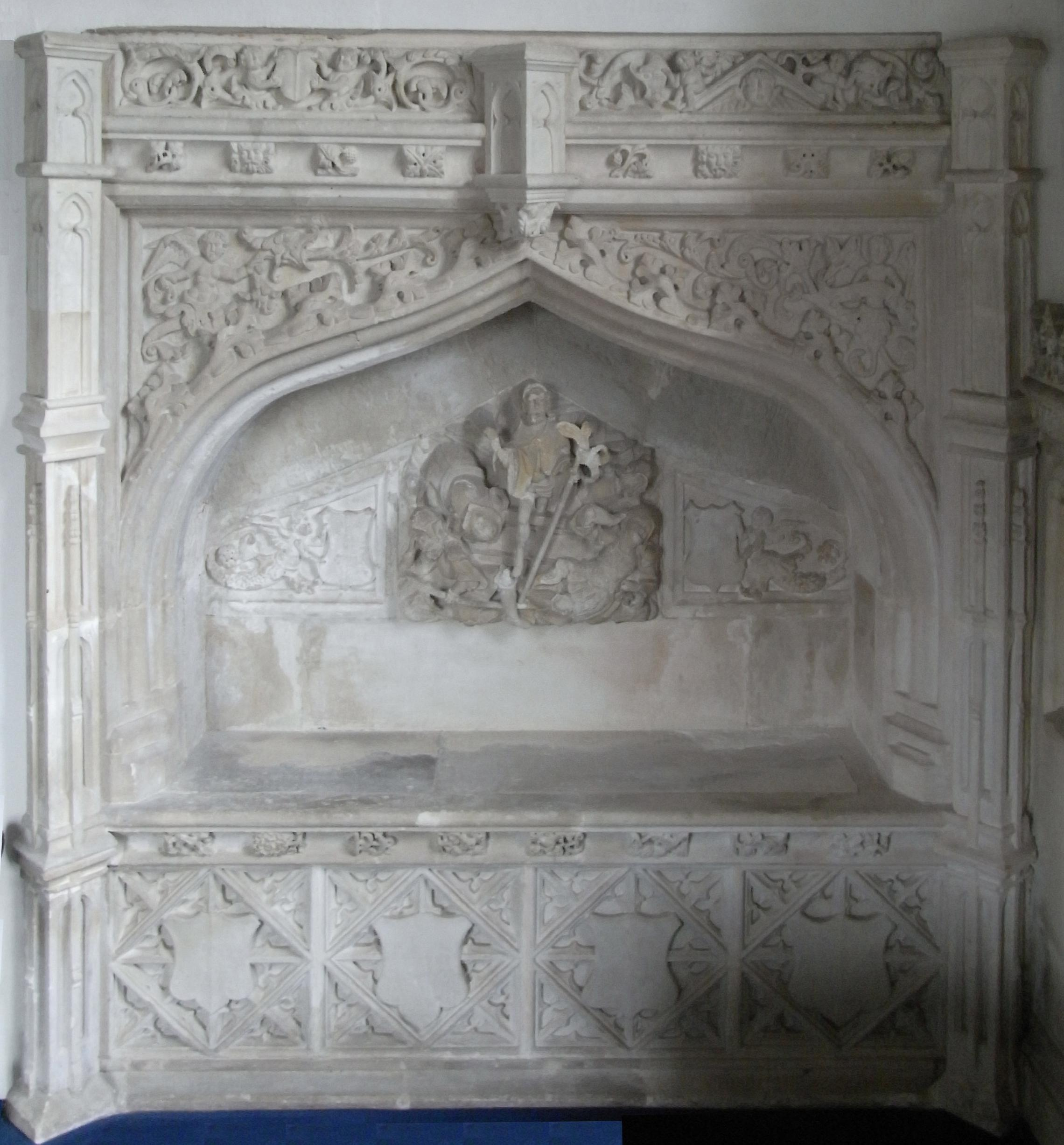
Easter Sepulchre in Holcombe Burnell church, probably the monument to Robert Dennis. (Note: The main panel shows Christ arising from the tomb, with slumbering guards. Transitional in style, Renaissance classical elements are shown such as a classical pediment and Italianate putti, but the whole is contained within a late Gothic arch.)

- Sir Thomas Denys, eldest son and heir, who married Anne Paulet, daughter of William Paulet, 3rd Marquess of Winchester, but died without male children leaving two daughters and co-heiresses:
  - Anne Denys, heiress of Bicton, who married Sir Henry Rolle (died 1616) of Stevenstone in Devon, an ancestor of John Rolle, 1st Baron Rolle (died 1842) and Barons Clinton, the latter of whom restored Livery Dole after the World War II bomb damage. The manors of Bicton, Littleham, Exmouth and East Budleigh passed thereupon to the Rolle family, with whose descendant Baron Clinton, much remains today in 2015, held by Clinton Devon Estates.
  - Margaret Denys (died 1632), heiress of Holcombe Burnell. In 1613 she married Sir Arthur Mainwaring of Ightfield, Shropshire, who was Carver to Prince Henry, the eldest son of King James I. He sold Holcombe Burnell.

Their other children included Arthur; James; Elizabeth, who was the wife successively of John Stewer, Sir Thomas Acton and Gilbert Blackaller; Margaret; Jane, who married Sir ... Fowks; Phillipa (died 1655), who married William Drake (died 1625) of Wiscomb; and Mary, who died childless.

Dennis died in 1592 and according to W. G. Hoskins, the Easter Sepulchre monument in Holcombe Burnell church was used as his tomb.

== Career ==
Denys was a Member of Parliament in 1555 and was knighted at some time before 16 November 1557. He was Feodary for the Devonshire estates of the Duchy of Lancaster (a crown possession) in 1556 and to 10 December 1566 and then between 7 December 1568 and 27 July 1590. He was appointed Sheriff of Devon for 1557/8 and again for 1567/8. In 1558 or 1559 he was appointed a Justice of the Peace for Devon, and was appointed to the honourable position of Recorder of Exeter from 1572; He held both positions until he died.

Denys acquired the manor of Bicton, on the other side of Exeter (i.e. the eastern side) to Holcombe Burnell.

== Livery Dole Almshouses ==
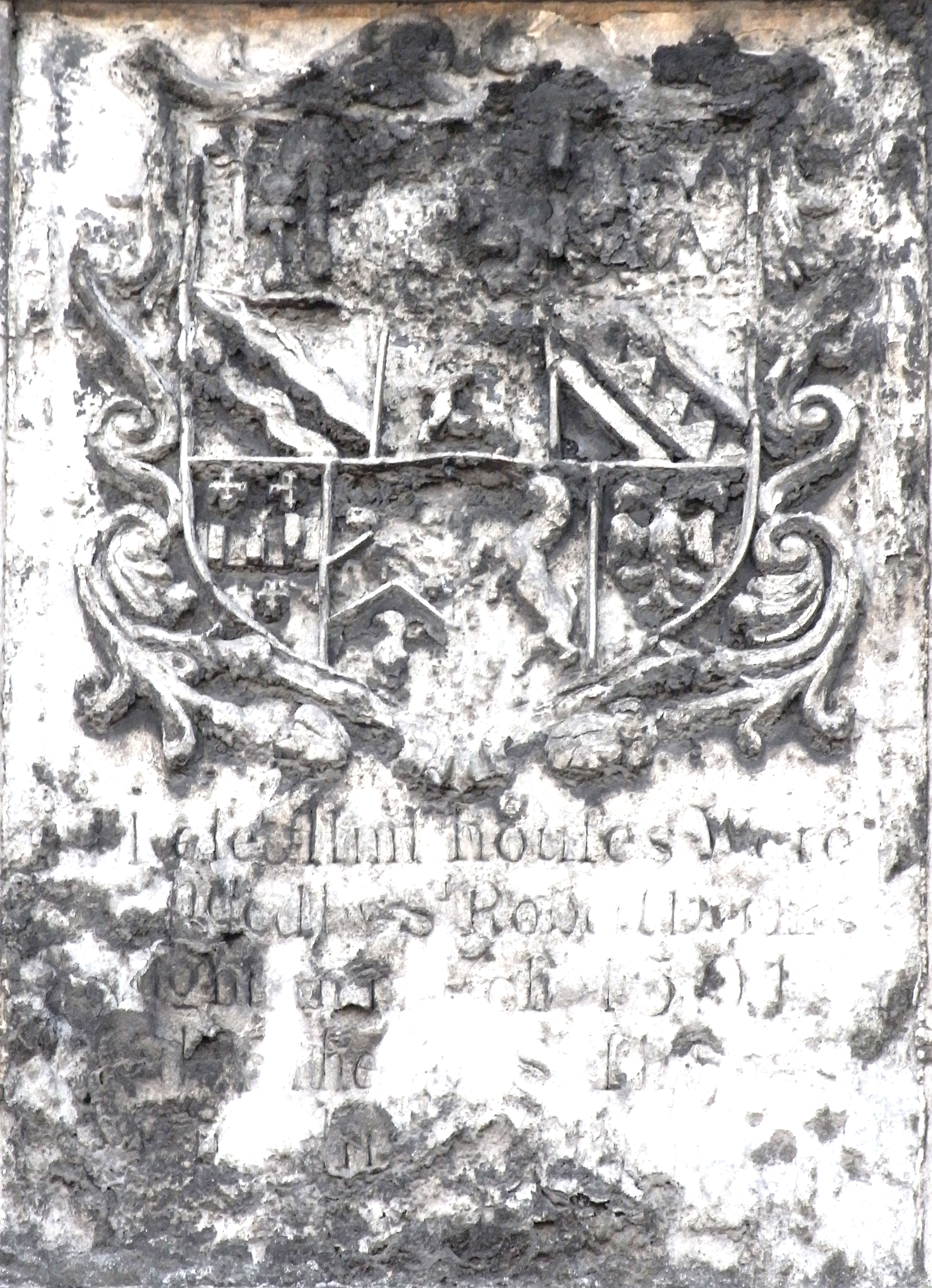
Stone tablet above entrance gate to Livery Dole, dedicated to Sir Robert Dennis, with Denys arms and quarterings above, inscribed: "These alms-houses were founded by Sir Robert Dennis, knight, in March 1591 and finished by Sir Thomas Dennis his brother (sic) in 1594"

In March 1591, he founded the Livery Dole Almshouses in Heavitree Road, to the east of Exeter, near which site in 1531/32 his father, as Sheriff of Devon, had supervised the burning at the stake of the Protestant martyr Thomas Benet. In his will, he requested that the building should be completed by his son, Sir Thomas Denys (1559–1613) (erroneously stated on a stone tablet above the entrance gate to have been his brother). The buildings were completed in 1594. In 1849, the almshouses were rebuilt as twin blocks on a larger scale by Lady Rolle of Bicton House, widow of John Rolle, 1st Baron Rolle (died 1842), eventual heir of the Dennis family. At that time new sculpted stone escutcheons showing the Dennis arms were affixed to the new buildings. The almshouses today occupy the central part of Livery Dole to the west of the chapel.

Sir Robert Dennis stated in his will dated 25 July 1592 and proved 22 September 1592, that he had "designed to set aside a plot of ground and to erect an alms-house and chapel for a certain number of poor people with weekly stipends and certain yearly commodities, as would appear in a devise signed and sealed by him". He appointed his son Sir Thomas Dennis as sole executor, with the testator's brothers Edward Dennis and Walter Dennis as overseers together with George Cary of Cockington and four others. He requested in his will that if he should die before its completion then his son Sir Thomas Dennis should complete the building work "in consideration of the love he bore him and that he had not disinherited him". He also directed his overseers to complete the work if his son should refuse to do so. Sir Robert did indeed die before the work was finished, and his son Sir Thomas Dennis completed the work in 1594. A "peppercorn" chief rent of one penny per annum was payable by the Livery Dole Hospital to the lord of the manor of Heavitree.

"There is not the slightest doubt of this Sir Thomas Dennis having been the testator's son", yet on a seemingly contemporary stone tablet erected over the entrance to the formerly existing quadrangle he was erroneously described as Sir Robert's "brother": "These alms-houses were founded by Sir Robert Dennis, knight, in March 1591 and finished by Sir Thomas Dennis his brother (sic) in 1594". The tablet contains also a heraldic escutcheon sculpted in relief showing ten quarterings of the Dennis family: (Note: The quarterings are: 1. Dennis, 2. Dabernon, 3. Giffard of Halsbury in the parish of Parkham, Devon, an heiress of Dabernon, 4. Brewer, heiress of Giffard, 5. Bockerell, 6. Cristenstowe, 7. Gobodesley, 8. Chiderleigh, 9. Donne (or Dunne), 10. Godolphin. These quarterings can be seen clearly and with tinctures on the well-preserved monument in the private Rolle Mausoleum at Bicton to Denys Rolle, the son of Anne Denys, heiress of Bicton, with an added first quarter of Rolle, which has necessitated the omission of the last quarter of Godolphin.)

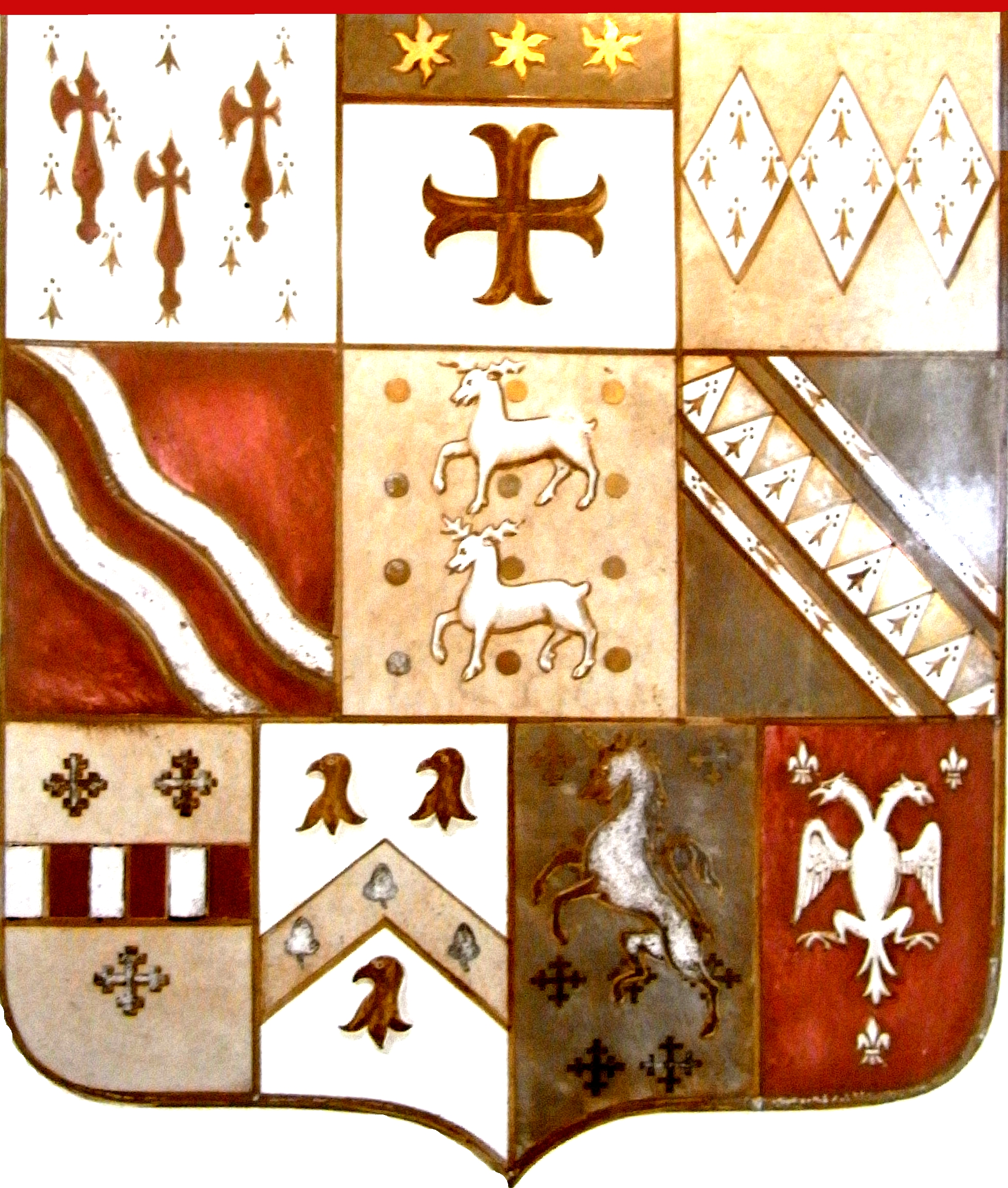
Heraldic quarterings of Robert Dennis, on stone escutcheon at Livery Dole

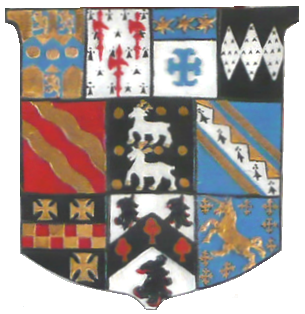
Heraldic achievement of Denys Rolle (1614–1638), Rolle Mausoleum, Bicton, with Rolle arms added as 1st quartering.

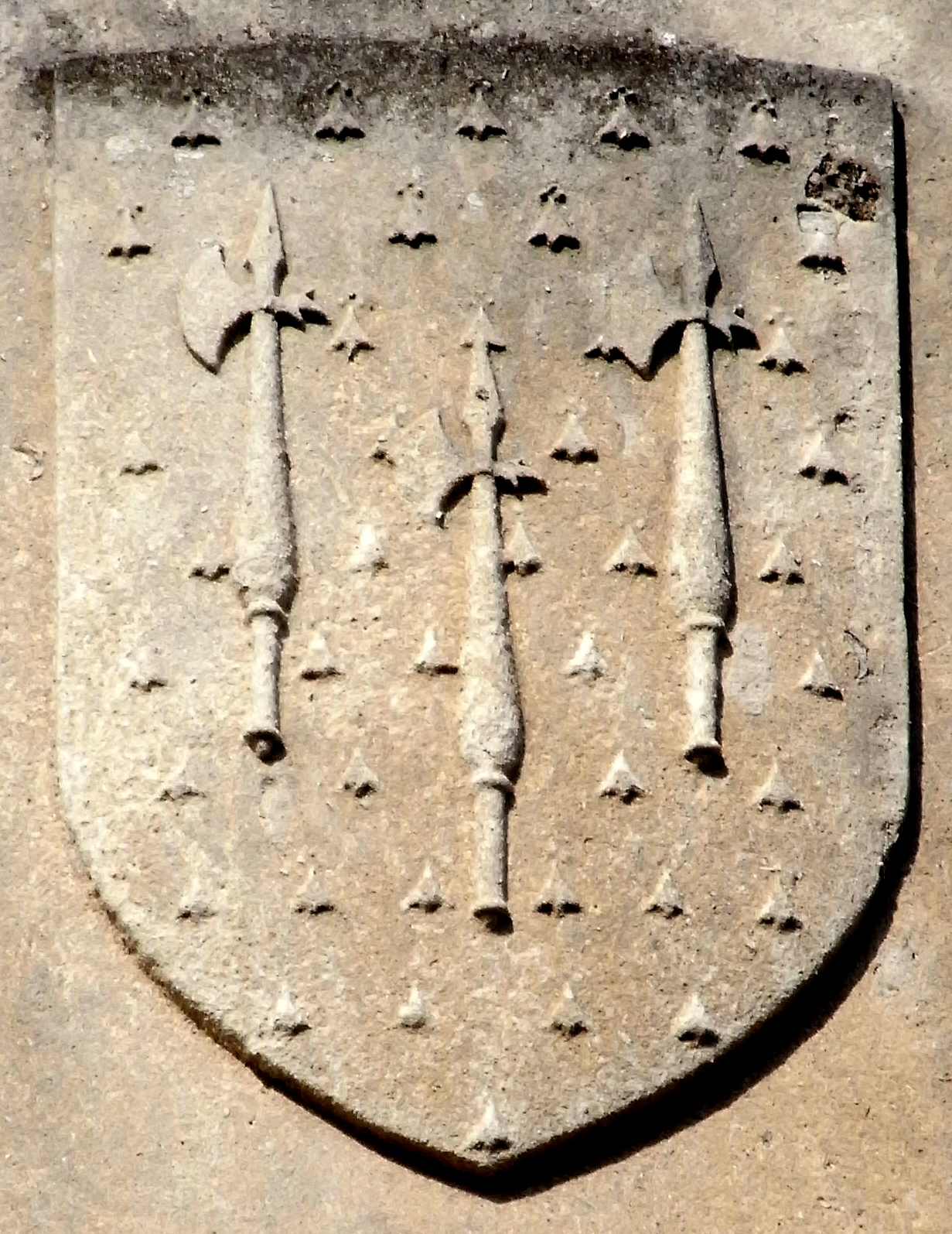
Denys arms sculpted on the new Livery Dole Almshouses erected by Lady Rolle, 1849.
