= Thomas Denys =

English administrator and politician

The Honourable Thomas Denys Kt.
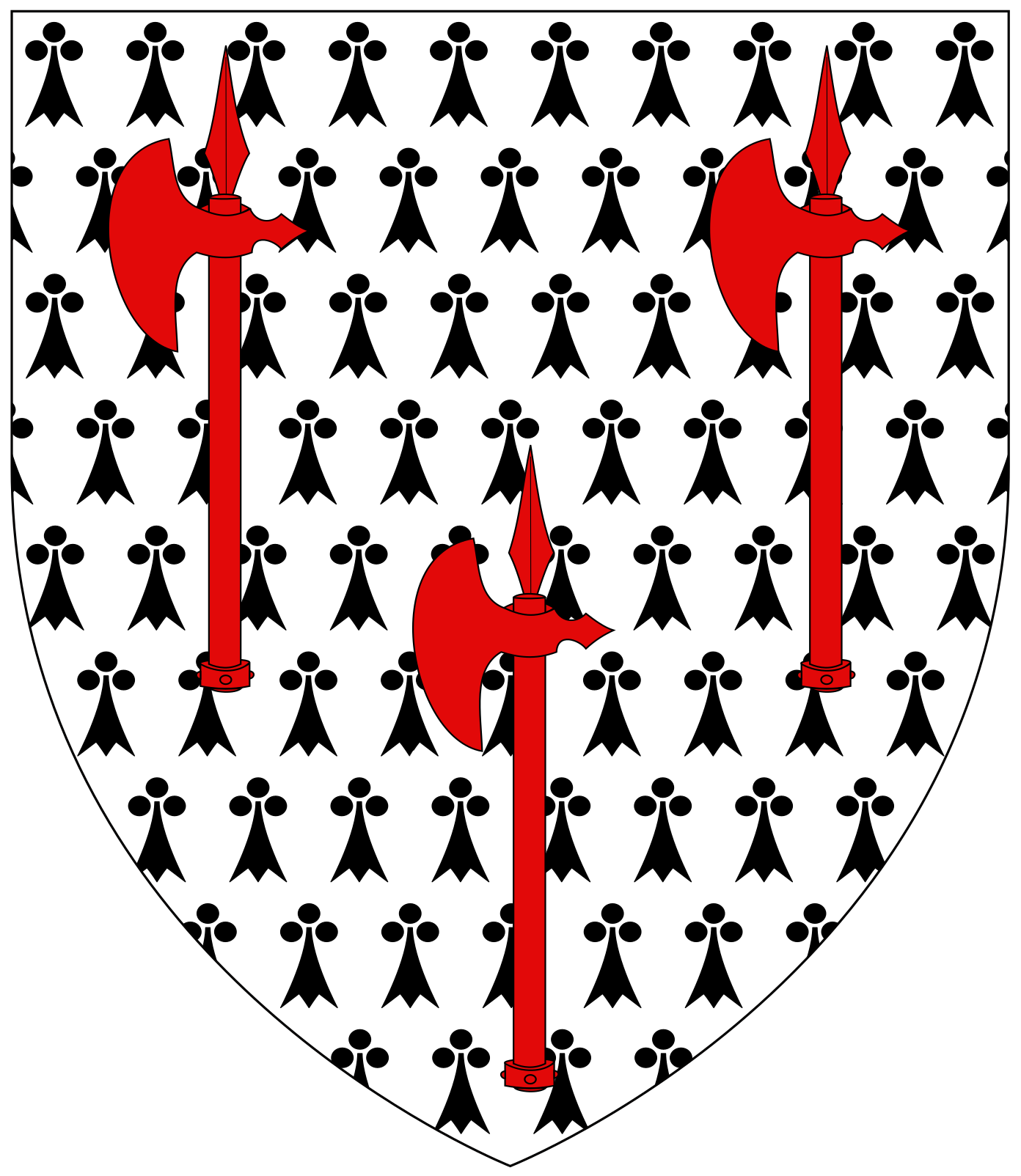
- Arms of Denys of Holcombe Burnel & Bicton, Devon: Ermine, three battle-axes gules

Member of Parliament for Devon
- In office 1529 – 1536, 1539–1540, 1553

Personal details
- Born: c. 1477 Holcombe Burnell, Devon
- Died: 18 February 1561 (aged 83–84)
- Spouse(s): Anne, widow of Thomas Warley; Elizabeth Donne
- Children: with Elizabeth: Sir Robert Denys; George Dennis; Edward Dennis; Walter Dennis; Gabriel Dennis; Margaret Dennis; and others ...
- Parent(s): Thomas Denys; Janera Loveday

Sir Thomas Denys (c. 1477 – 18 February 1561) of Holcombe Burnell, near Exeter, Devon, was a prominent lawyer who served as Sheriff of Devon nine times between 1507/8 to 1553/4 and as MP for Devon. He acquired large estates in Devon at the Dissolution of the Monasteries.

== Origins ==
He was the son and heir of Sir Thomas Denys (died 1498) of Holcombe Burnell by his wife Janera Loveday, daughter of Philip Loveday of Sneston in Suffolk.

== Career ==
He served twice as Recorder of Exeter, 1514–1544 and September 1551 to his death. Sir Thomas is notorious as having supervised in Exeter, in his capacity as Sheriff of Devon or as Recorder of Exeter, the burning at the stake of the Protestant martyr Thomas Benet in January 1531/32. The burning took place outside the eastern side of the city walls, near the Livery Dole where, in 1592, his son, Sir Robert Dennis, commenced the building of an almshouse, possibly an act of atonement for his father's action.

In April 1558 he was commissioned to command the Militia of the City of Exeter and neighbouring Hundreds of Devonshire.

== Lands acquired ==
- Royal grant 11 February 1539. The following grant from King Henry VIII dated 11 February 1539 was made to Thomas Denys of Holcombe Burnell, Knt. for £1,127 3s 4d:

"the Manors of Litlam alias Littelham and Exmouthe belonging to the late Monastery of Shirbourne, Dorset, in as full manner as the last Abbot held the same; also the messuage formerly in the tenure of Katherine Lytton in the parish of St. Peter-the-Less, in the ward of Beynardes Castell in London; which messuage lately belonged to the late Monastery of Croxden, Staffs. and is worth 26s 8d per year. Also the hundred of Budlegh alias East Budleigh which came to the King's hands by the attainder of Henry Courteney, late Marquis of Exeter. To hold by the following yearly rent, viz: for the Manors of Litlam and Exmouth, £6 3s 10d; for the messuage in London 2s 8d, the hundred of East Budleigh to be held by the 20th part of a knight's fee without any rent".

His later heir Henry Rolle (1708–1750), later 1st Baron Rolle, of Stevenstone obtained an inspeximus of this grant from King George II in 1731, immediately on coming into his inheritance following his father's death in 1730.

- St Nicholas' Priory, Exeter, granted 25 June 1541, following Dissolution.
- Buckfast Abbey, Devon

== Marriages and children ==
He married twice; firstly, before 1506, to Anne, widow of Thomas Warley (alias Waley) and of Thomas Wood of London.

He married, secondly, in 1524, Elizabeth, daughter of Sir Angel Donne of London, and Anne Hawarden (alias Hawardine), of Cheshire, and widow of Thomas Murfyn, an alderman and former Lord Mayor of London. By March 1534 his stepdaughter, Frances Murfyn, had married, Thomas Cromwell's nephew, Richard. His wife's brother, Gabriel Donne (died 1558), was the last Abbot of Buckfast Abbey in Devon, who in 1539 on the Dissolution of the Monasteries surrendered his abbey to Sir William Petre, as agent for King Henry VIII and was rewarded with a large annual pension of £120. The site of the abbey was granted by the king to Dennis, the Abbot's brother-in-law.

By his second wife he had five sons and three daughters, including:

- Sir Robert Denys (died 1592), his eldest son, was MP for Devon in 1555 and Sheriff of Devon, who acquired the manor of Bicton, on the other side of Exeter (i.e. the eastern side) to Holcombe Burnell. It is likely that the Easter Sepulchre in the church is his tomb and monument.
- George Dennis
- Edward Dennis
- Walter Dennis
- Gabriel Dennis
- Margaret Dennis, married George Kirkham of Blackden in Devon.

== Sources ==
- Goodwin, Gordon (1888). "Donne, Gabriel" . Dictionary of National Biography. Vol. 15. p. 223.
- Hoskins, William George (1954). Devon. A New Survey of England. Vol. 2. London: Collins.
- Hofmann, T.M. (1982). "Cromwell, alias Williams, Richard (by 1512-44), of London; Stepney, Mdx. and Hinchingbroke, Hunts.". In Bindoff, S.T. (ed.). The History of Parliament: the House of Commons 1509-1558. Boydell and Brewer. Archived from the original on 2 March 2015.
- Kirk, L.M.; Hawkyard, A.D.K. (1982). "Denys, Sir Thomas (by 1477-1561), of Holcombe Burnell and Bicton, Devon and London". In Bindoff, S.T. (ed.). The History of Parliament: the House of Commons 1509-1558. Boydell and Brewer. Archived from the original on 13 May 2021.
- MacCulloch, Diarmaid (2018). Thomas Cromwell: A Life. London: Allen Lane. ISBN 9780141967660.
- Oliver, George (1821). The History of Exeter. Exeter: R. Cullum. p. 164.
- Oliver, George (1846). Monasticon Dioecesis Exoniensis, Being a Collection of Records and Instruments Illustrating the Ancient Conventual, Collegiate, and, Eleemosynary Foundations in the Counties of Cornwall and Devon, with Historical Notices, and a Supplement, Comprising a List of Churches in the Diocese, an Amended Edition of the Taxation of Pope Nicholas, and an Abstract of the Chantry Rolls. Exeter: P.A. Hannaford.
- Robertson, Mary Louise (1975). Thomas Cromwell's Servants: the Ministerial Household in Early Tudor Government and Society (PhD thesis). University of California, Los Angeles.
- Vivian, J. L. (1895). The Visitations of the County of Devon, Comprising the Heralds' Visitations of 1531, 1564, to 1620, with additions by J. L. Vivian. Exeter: H.S. Eland.
- Col Henry Walrond, Historical Records of the 1st Devon Militia (4th Battalion The Devonshire Regiment), With a Notice of the 2nd and North Devon Militia Regiments, London: Longmans, 1897/Andesite Press, 2015, ISBN 978-1-37617881-4.
