= Recorder of Exeter =

Judicial position in Exeter, Devon

The recorder of Exeter was a recorder, a form of senior judicial officer, usually an experienced barrister, within the jurisdiction of the City of Exeter in Devon. Historically he was usually a member of the Devonshire gentry. The position of recorder of any borough or city carried a great deal of prestige and power of patronage. The recorder was often entrusted by the mayor and corporation to nominate its members of parliament, as was the case with Sir Hugh I Pollard (fl. 1536, 1545), Recorder of Barnstaple, who in 1545 nominated the two MP's to represent the Borough of Barnstaple. In the 19th century a recorder was the sole judge who presided at a Quarter Sessions of a Borough, a "Court of Record", and was a barrister of at least five years' standing. He fixed the dates of the Quarter Sessions at his own discretion "as long as he holds it once every quarter of a year", or more often if he deemed fit.

== List of recorders of Exeter ==
- (1514–1544) (1st term) Sir Thomas Denys (c.1477–1561) of Holcombe Burnell
- (1544–1548) John Harris of Hayne, serjeant-at-law
- (1548 – ) Sir Lewis Pollard (died before 1569) of Bishops Nympton, serjeant-at-law
- (Sept. 1551–1561) (2nd term) Sir Thomas Denys (c.1477–1561) of Holcombe Burnell
- 1650–1654; Edmund Prideaux
- 1654–1660; Thomas Bampfield

2007 Since 2007, Judges Graham Cottle, Francis Gilbert, Geoffrey Mercer, Peter Johnson, Anna Richardson and James Patrick have been appointed Honorary Recorder of Exeter

== List of deputy recorders of Exeter ==
- 1652–1654; Thomas Bampfield

== Sources ==
- Vivian, Lt.Col. J.L., (Ed.) The Visitations of the County of Devon: Comprising the Heralds' Visitations of 1531, 1564 & 1620, Exeter, 1895
- Roberts, Stephen (2004). "Bampfield, Thomas". Oxford Dictionary of National Biography (online ed.). Oxford University Press. doi:10.1093/ref:odnb/1260. (Subscription, Wikipedia Library access or UK public library membership required.)
