= Agnes Prest =

English Protestant martyr (died 1557)

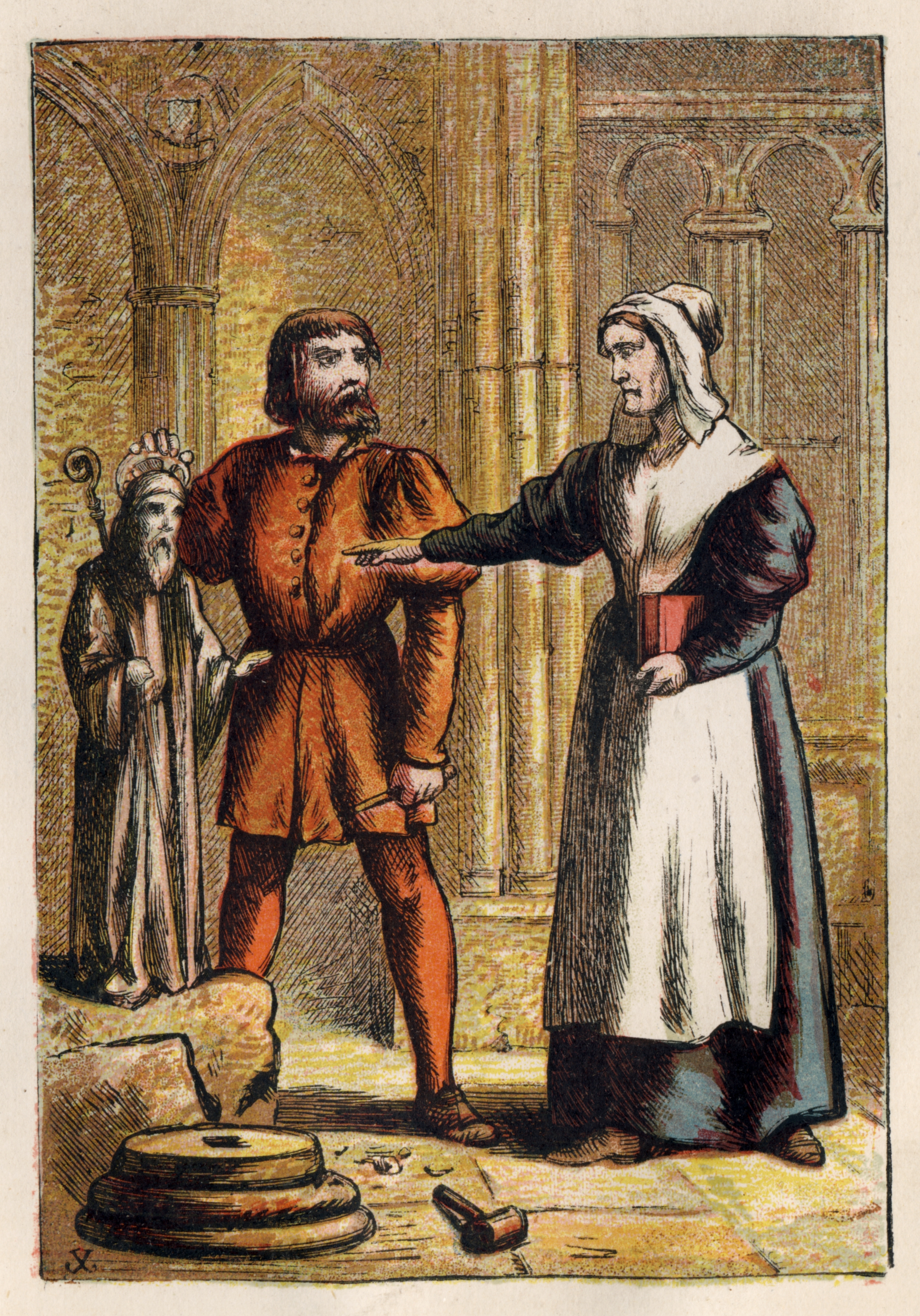
"What a madman art thou, to make them new noses, which within a few days shall all lose their heads!" Illustration of "Prest's Wife and the Stonemason" by Kronheim from the 1887 edition of Foxe's Book of Martyrs

Agnes Prest (died 15 August 1557) was a Cornish Protestant martyr from the reign of the Catholic Queen Mary. She was burned at the stake at Southernhay in Exeter in 1557.

According to Foxe's Book of Martyrs, and the story of Exeter Protestant Martyrs she lived near Launceston, Cornwall, and was married to a Catholic husband. She left her husband over his Catholicism, and went to be a spinner but she later on returned to him and was arrested and indicted at the Launceston Assizes. She was then put in Launceston jail and then transferred to Exeter jail. In Exeter jail, she was brought before the Bishop of Exeter, Bishop Turberville. When questioned, she denied the Catholic doctrine of transubstantiation. She was then released for a month.

Whilst she was released, she is said to have met a Dutch stonemason in Exeter Cathedral who was repairing the statues of the saints beloved of the Catholics. According to Foxe, she said to him "What a madman art thou, to make them new noses, which within a few days shall all lose their heads". After that point she was returned to jail where she had many visitors, including Walter Raleigh's mother, Catherine Raleigh, who praised her for her "godly life."

She was then tried for heresy by the Mayor of Exeter, refused to recant her beliefs and was executed by being burnt to death on 15 August 1557.

== Denmark Road Protestant Martyrs' Memorial ==
In 1909 a monument in the form of an obelisk of Dartmoor granite was erected in Denmark Road, Exeter, to the memories of the Protestant Martyrs Agnes Prest (d. 1557) and Thomas Benet (d. 1531). This monument was designed by Harry Hems and was erected with money raised through public subscription. Two bronze sculpted relief panels by Harry Hems on the base of the obelisk depict Prest burning at the stake and Benet nailing his protest to the door of the cathedral. The following inscriptions are contained on two bronze plaques affixed on opposite sides of the base:

To the glory of God & in honour of his faithful witnesses who near this spot yielded their bodies to be burned for love to Christ and in vindication of the principles of the Protestant Reformation this monument was erected by public subscription AD 1909. They being dead yet speak.

And:

In grateful remembrance of Thomas Benet, M.A. who suffered at Livery Dole A.D. 1531 for denying the supremacy of the Pope and of Agnes Prest who suffered on Southernhay A.D. 1557 for refusing to accept the doctrine of Transubstantiation. Faithful unto death.

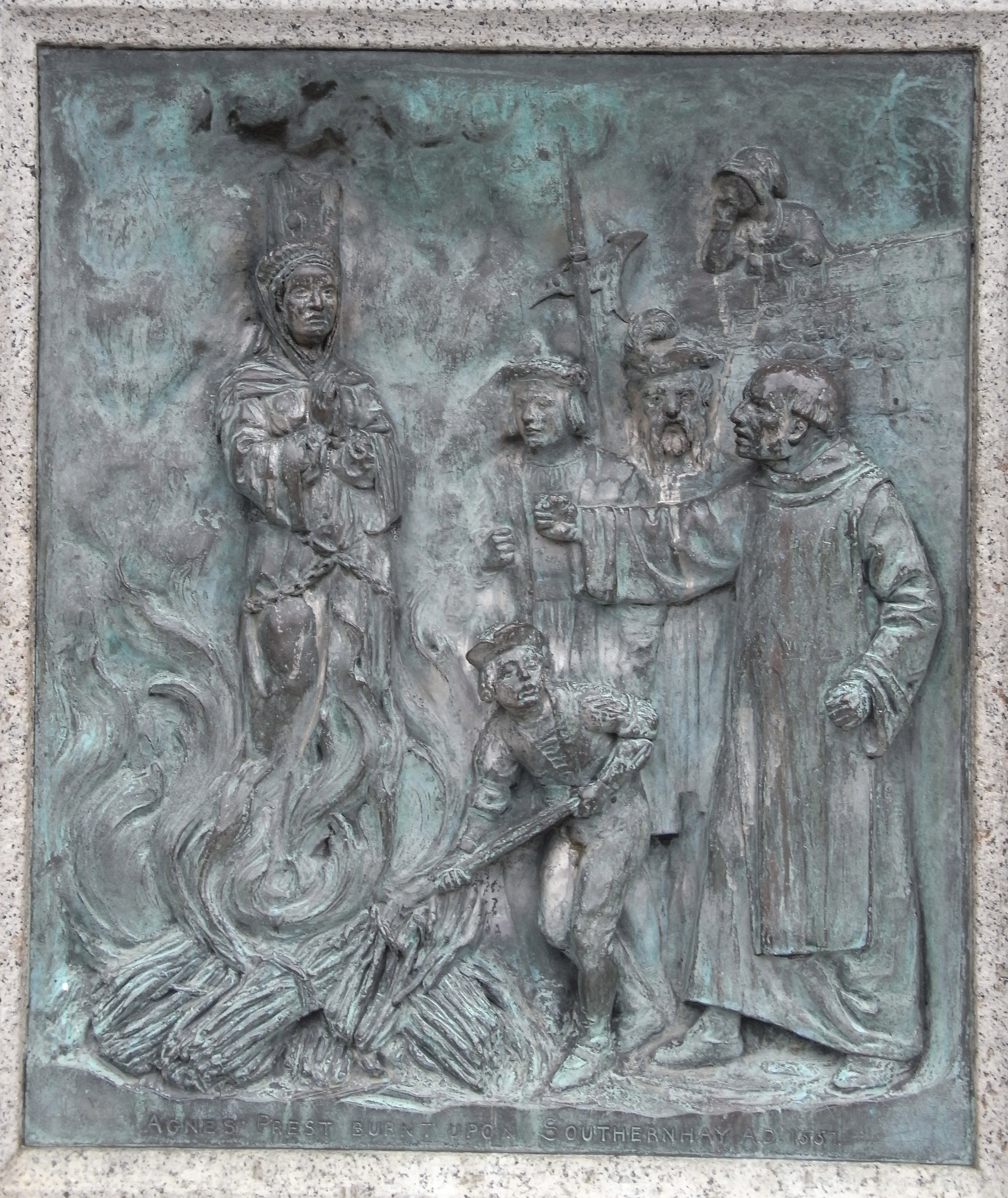
"Agnes Prest burnt upon Southernhay AD 1557". 1909 bronze relief sculpted panel by Harry Hems showing the burning at the stake of the Protestant martyr Agnes Prest in 1557, on the base of the Protestant Martyrs' Monument, Denmark Road, Exeter, Devon.

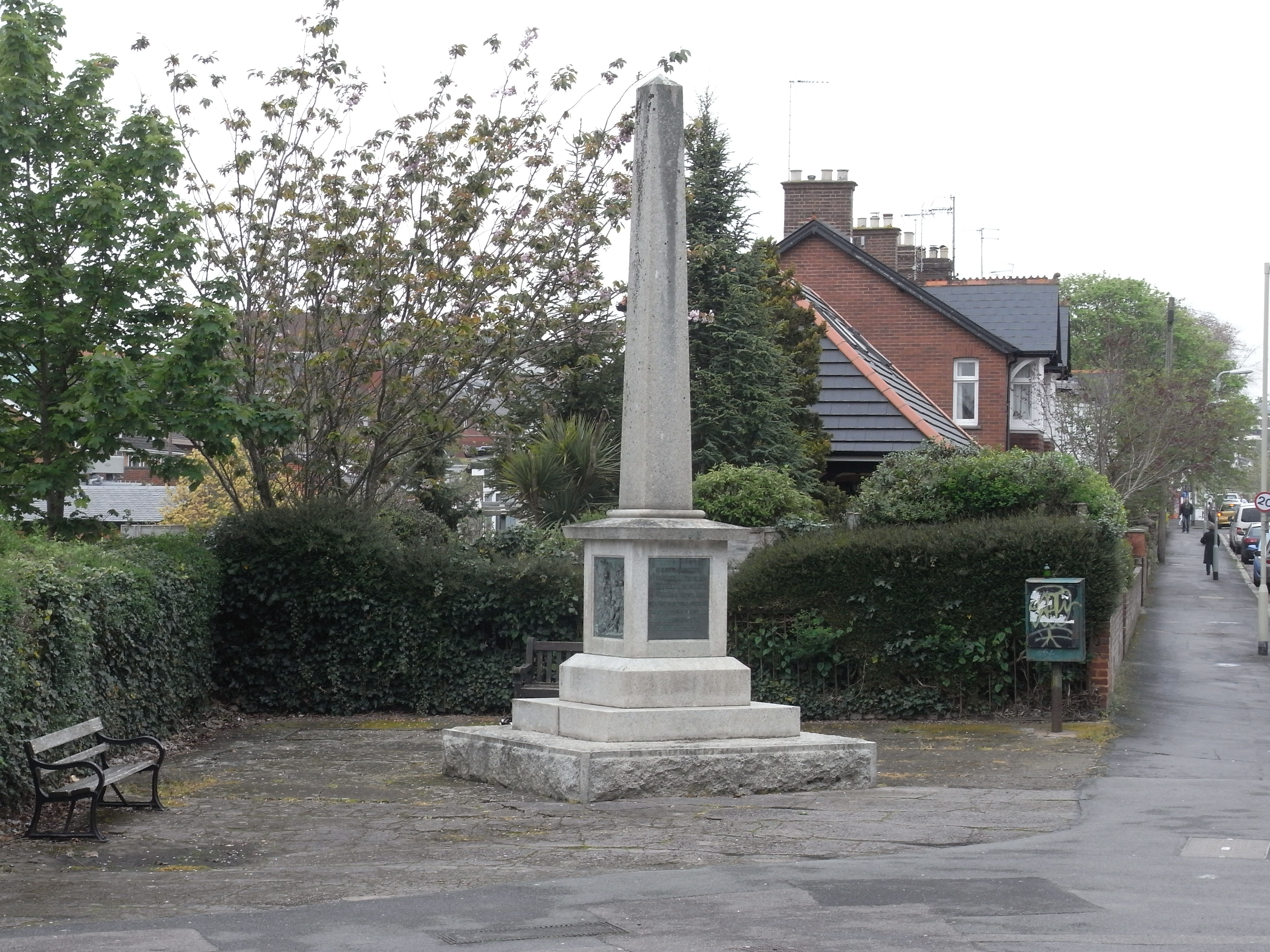
The Protestant Martyrs' Monument, Denmark Road, Exeter, Devon. Erected 1909 in memory of the martyrs Thomas Benet (d. 1531) and Agnes Prest (d. 1557).

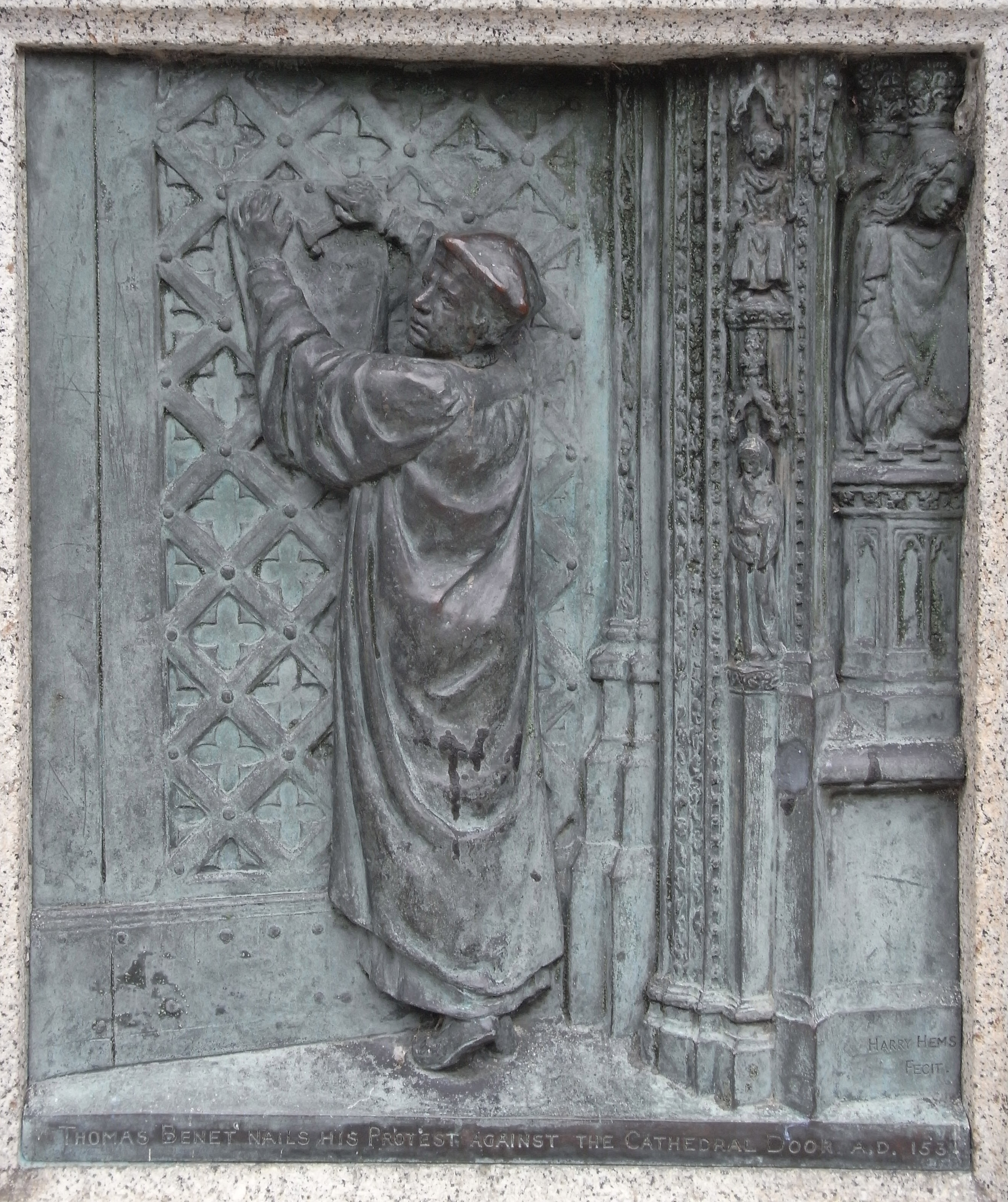
"Thomas Benet nails his protest against the Cathedral Door AD 1531". 1909 Bronze relief sculpted panel by Harry Hems showing protest by Protestant martyr Thomas Benet which earned him martyrdom in 1531 at Livery Dole, Exeter. Affixed to the base of the Protestant Martyrs' Monument, Denmark Road, Exeter, Devon.
