= Robert H. Dennis =

American politician

Robert H. Dennis Sr. (c. 1846 - April 17, 1900) was a teacher and state legislator in Florida. In 1875 he represented Jackson County, Florida in the Florida House of Representatives.

He was born in Pennsylvania. He was elected to the state house along with Benjamin F. Livingston and William J. Purman.

== See also ==
- African American officeholders from the end of the Civil War until before 1900
