= Evergreen Cemetery (Bartow, Florida) =

Cemetery in Bartow, Florida

Coordinates: 27°53′50″N 81°51′15″W

- Interactive map of Evergreen Cemetery

Details
- Location: Bartow, Florida
- Type: Historic African American cemetery
- Size: 4.6 acres (1.9 ha)

Evergreen Cemetery is a historic African American cemetery in Bartow, Florida.

In 2014, the city commission passed a resolution to acquire the cemetery through eminent domain. No owner was reportedly known and the historic character and deteriorating condition of the cemetery were listed. A court order gave the city ownership of the cemetery in December 2014 and a cleanup and survey were planned. A cleanup of the cemetery was scheduled for November 21, 2020. It covers 4.6 acres. The cemetery is on the city's west side along busy State Road 60 and Baker Avenue.

In 2022, Polk County erected a historical marker on the site.

== Burials ==
- Benjamin F. Livingston a Reconstruction era legislator.
- Prince Johnson, one of Bartow's city founders
- Ossian Sweet and his father Henry W. Sweet
- George W. Bayley, father of Bartow mayor Charlie E. Bayley
- Andy and Tamer Moore
