= Livery Dole =

Ancient site in England

Coordinates: 50.72196°N 3.51027°W

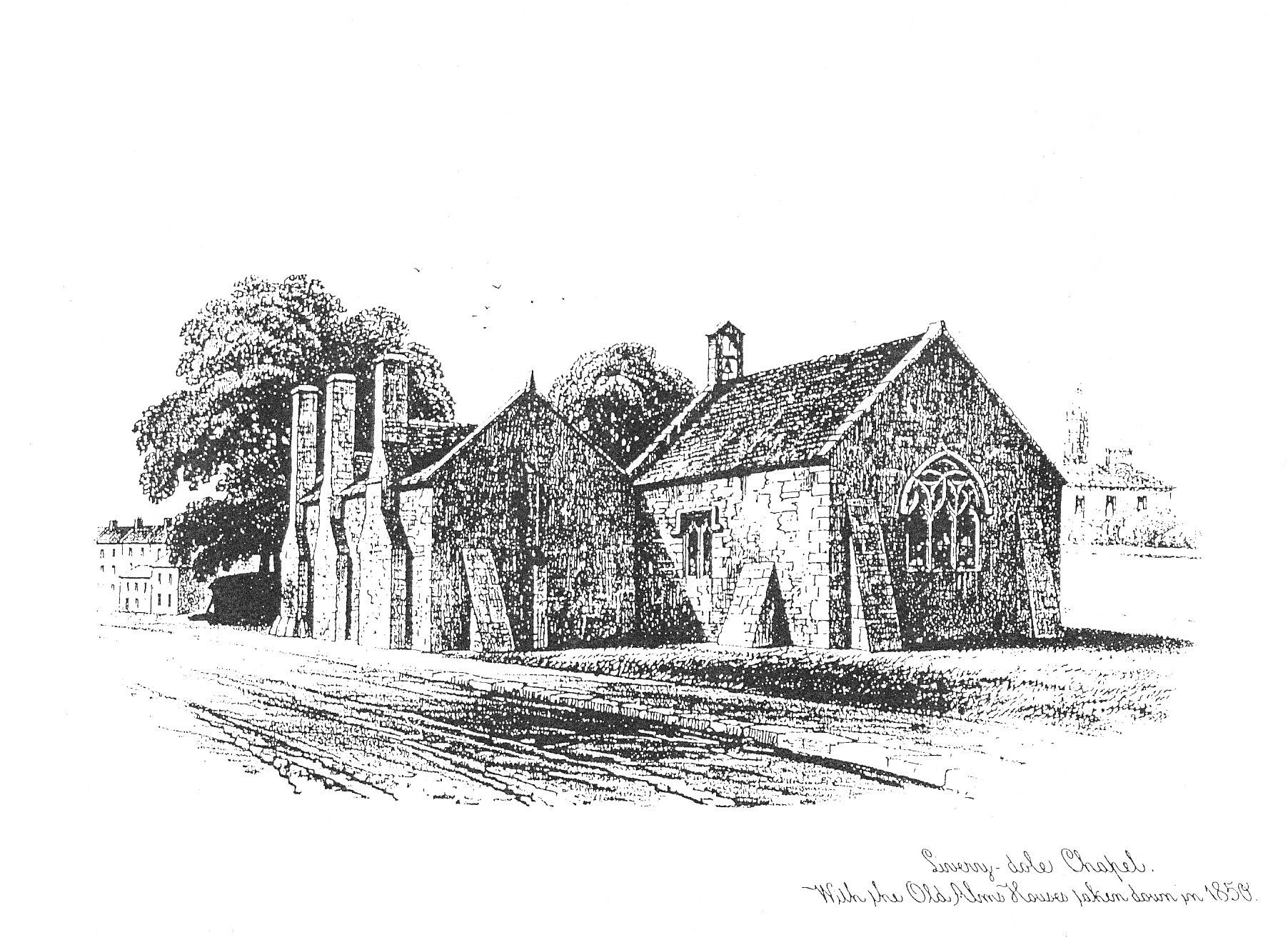
- "Livery Dole Chapel with the old alms-houses taken down in 1850". View from south-east drawn by W.Spreat of Exeter
- Interactive map of Livery Dole
- Type: Ancient site
- Location: Exeter
- Region: Devon

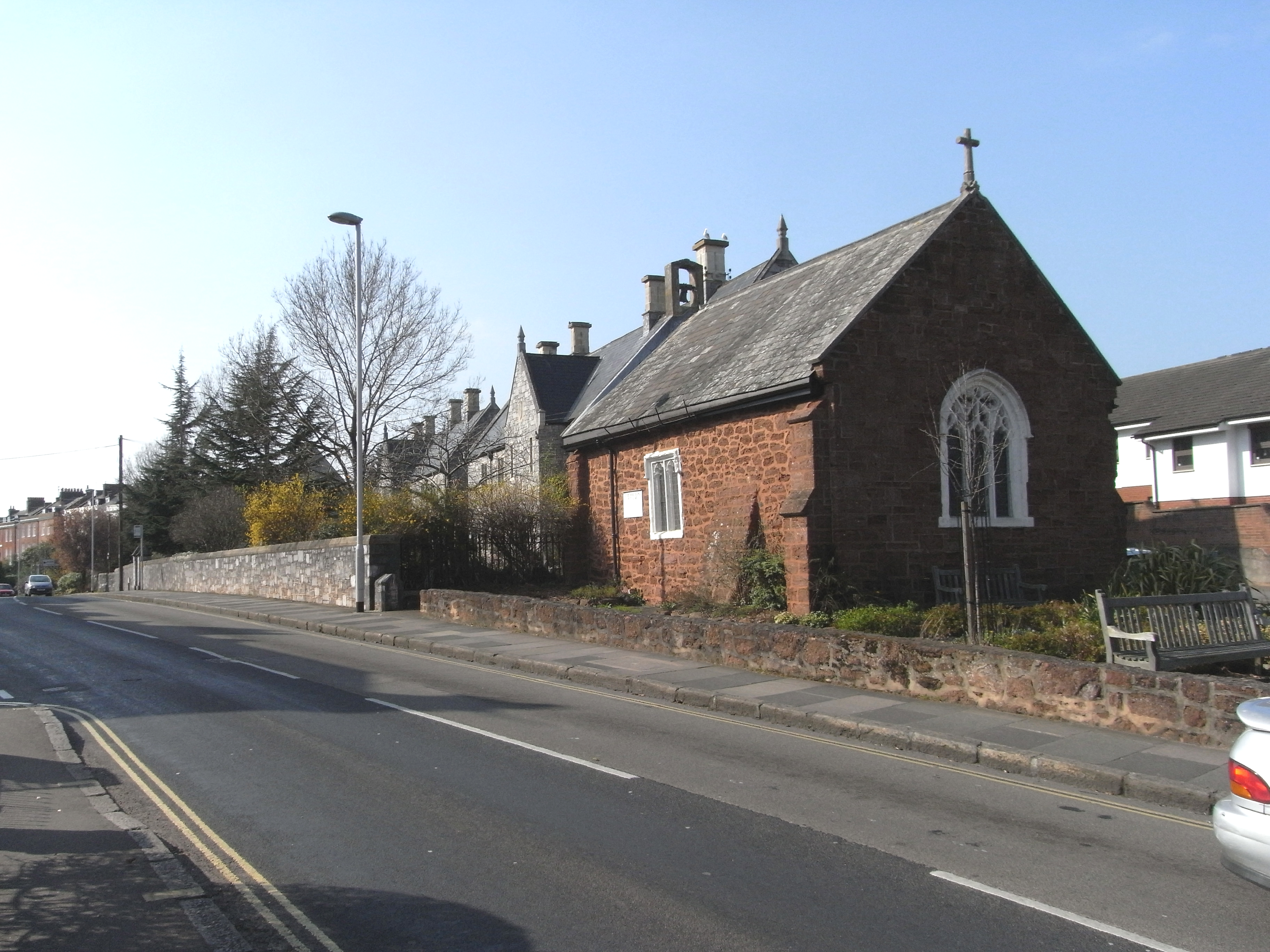
Livery Dole in 2012, viewed from south-east, showing new position of 1849 replacement almshouses

Livery Dole in Exeter, Devon, is an ancient triangular site between what is today Heavitree Road and Magdalen Road, in the eastern suburbs of Exeter. It was most notoriously used as a place for executions, and has contained an almshouse and chapel since 1591.

== Toponymy ==
The name "Livery Dole" is first recorded in a document of 1279 and probably derives from the Old English Leofhere, a man who owned the land, and dole, meaning a piece of land.

== Place of execution ==
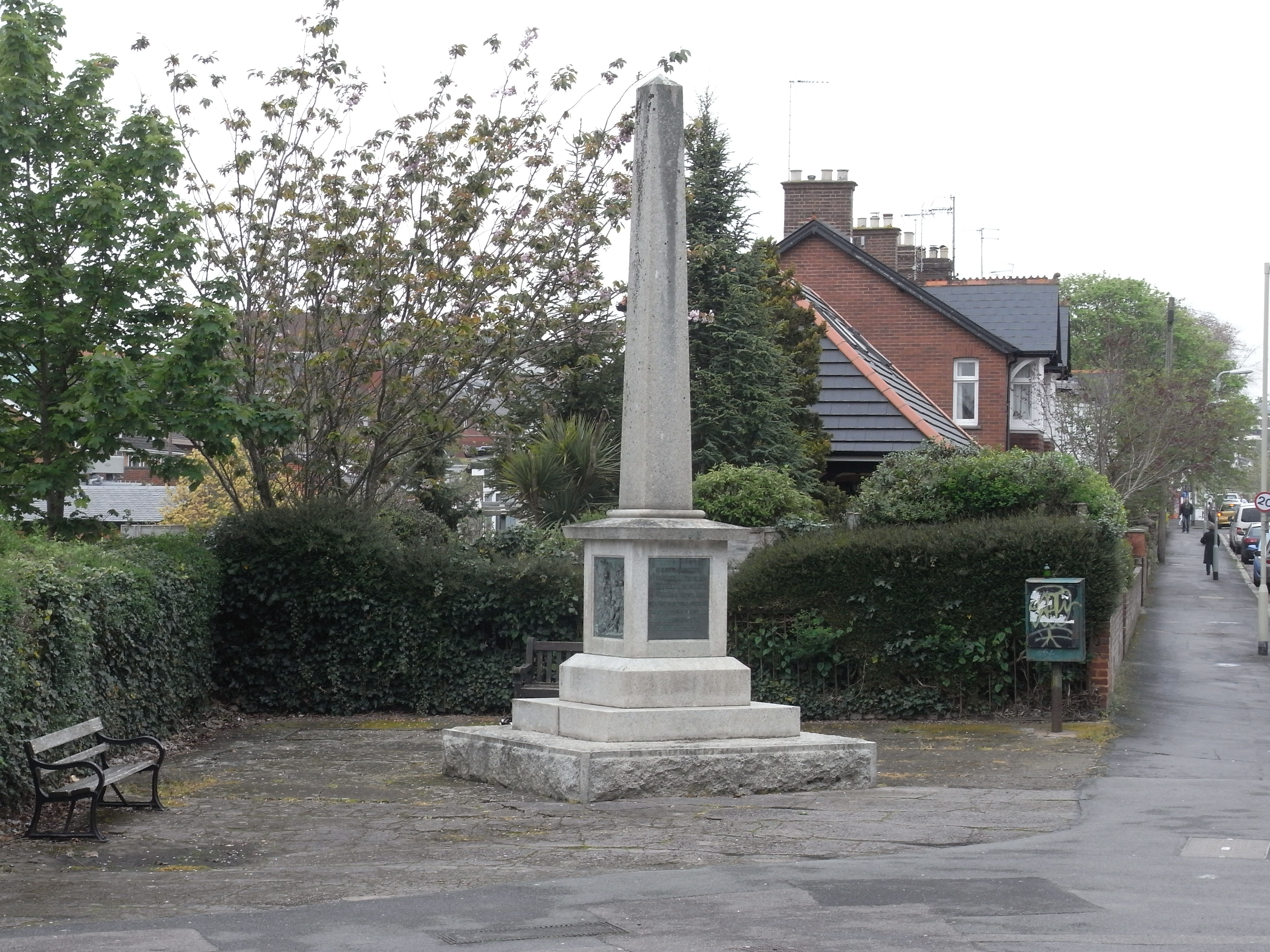
Protestant Martyrs' Monument, Denmark Road, Exeter, Devon. Erected 1909 in memory of the martyrs Thomas Benet and Agnes Prest.

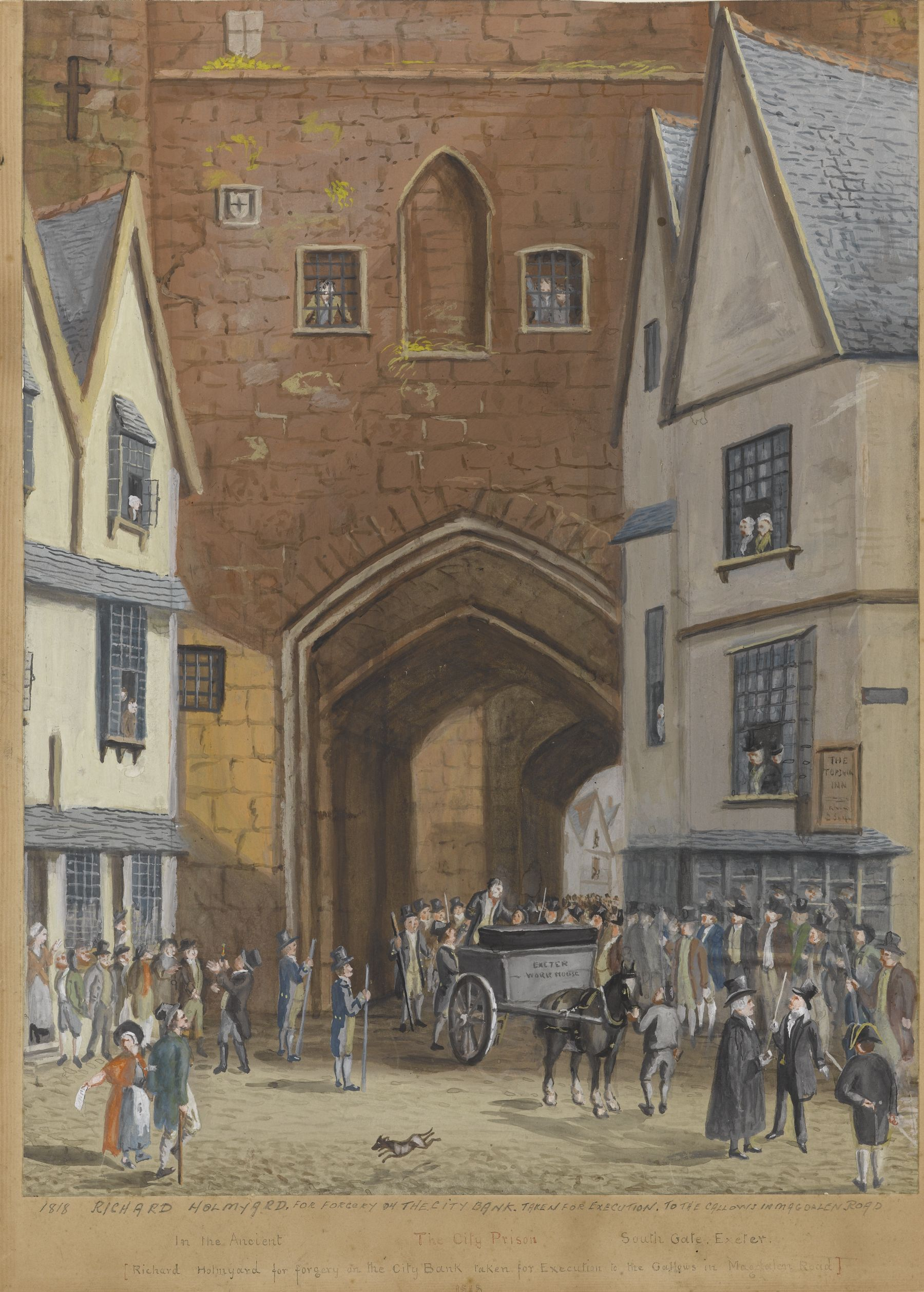
Anonymous watercolour of Richard Holmyard arrested for forgery on the City Bank taken for execution to the gallows in Magdalen Road, 1818. From the Royal Albert Memorial Museum's collection (685/1997/4)

There were two places in Livery Dole used for executions. Until 1531, heretics were burned at the stake near the modern day junction of Magdalen Road and Barrack Road. From 1531 to 1818 hangings were performed on a site near College Avenue known as "Magdalen Drop".

The most notable execution was the 1531 burning at the stake of the Protestant martyr Thomas Benet. Lighted furze was pushed into his face when he refused to deny as heresy his action of nailing on the west door of Exeter Cathedral a message proclaiming the pope to be an Anti-Christ and rejecting his supremacy in religious affairs.

In 1909 a monument in the form of an obelisk of Dartmoor granite was erected to Benet's memory in nearby Denmark Road. This monument was designed by Harry Hems and was erected with money raised through public subscription. It also commemorates the martyrdom of Agnes Prest who in 1557 was burnt for heresy at the stake in Southernhay. Two bronze sculpted relief panels by Harry Hems on the base of the obelisk depict Benet banging on the door of the Cathedral and Prest burning at the stake. The following inscriptions are contained on two bronze plaques affixed on opposite sides of the base:

"In grateful remembrance of Thomas Benet, M.A. who suffered at Livery Dole A.D. 1531 for denying the supremacy of the Pope and of Agnes Prest who suffered on Southernhay A.D. 1557 for refusing to accept the doctrine of Transubstantiation. Faithful unto death".

And:

"To the glory of God & in honour of his faithful witnesses who near this spot yielded their bodies to be burned for love to Christ and in vindication of the principles of the Protestant Reformation this monument was erected by public subscription AD 1909. They being dead yet speak".

According to Charles Worthy, in his History of the Suburbs of Exeter (1892), the iron ring which was placed around the victims' bodies and the chain which attached them to the stake were found in 1851 during rebuilding work on the almshouses.

== Chapel and almshouses ==
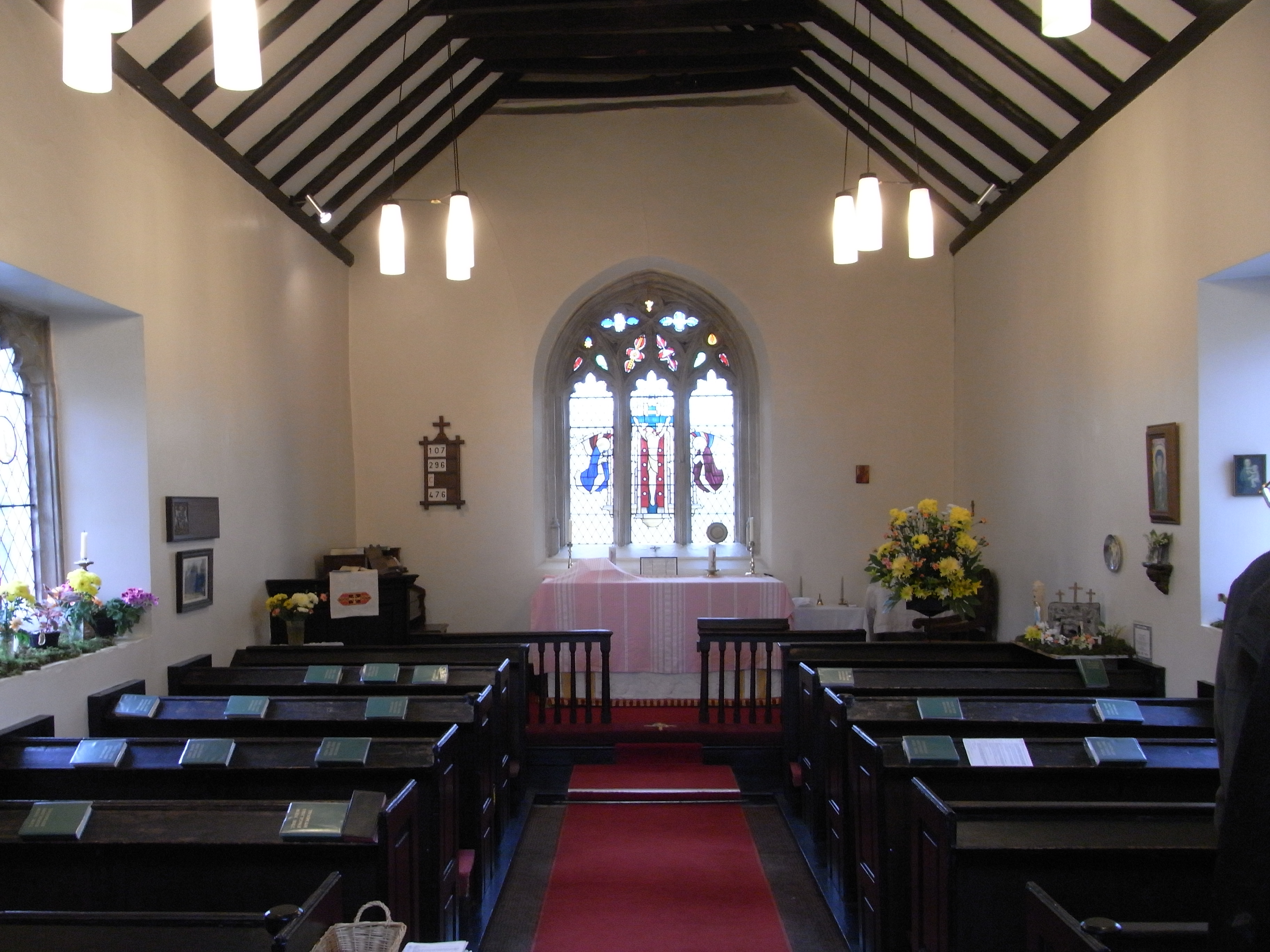
Interior of chapel of St Clarus, looking east toward the altar

Occupying the apex, or easternmost part, of the triangular site is the Chapel of Saint Clarus, an English missionary martyred in about 894 near the River Epte in Normandy.

The present building made from red Heavitree stone dates from a re-building of 1592 by Sir Robert Dennis (died 1592) of Holcombe Burnell, but it was built originally between 1418 and 1439 to serve as a chantry in which to pray for the souls of persons executed on this spot. The chapter roll of 1439 mentions the Livery Dole Chapel as "Capella Sancti Clari extra portam australem infra parochiam de Hevetre" ("The Chapel of Saint Clarus outside the southern gate (of the City of Exeter) within the parish of Heavitree"). In the year 1418 however the chapel was not included amongst a deed of that date found in the 19th century amongst the records of Exeter City Corporation listing all the other chapels in Heavitree, namely St Clements and St Eligius.

Sir Robert Dennis (1525–1592) of Holcombe Burnell and Bicton stated in his will dated 25 July 1592 and proved 22 September 1592, that he had "designed to set aside a plot of ground and to erect an alms-house and chapel for a certain number of poor people with weekly stipends and certain yearly commodities, as would appear in a devise signed and sealed by him". He appointed his son Sir Thomas Dennis as sole executor, with the testator's brothers Edward and Walter Dennis as overseers together with George Cary of Cockington and four others. He requested in his will that if he should die before its completion his son Sir Thomas Dennis should complete the building work "in consideration of the love he bore him and that he had not disinherited him". He also directed his overseers to complete the work if his son should refuse to do so. Sir Robert did indeed die before the work was finished, and his son Sir Thomas Dennis completed the work in 1594. A "peppercorn" chief rent of one penny per annum was payable by the Livery Dole Hospital to the lord of the manor of Heavitree.

There is not the slightest doubt of this Sir Thomas Dennis having been the testator's son, yet on a seemingly contemporary stone tablet erected over the entrance to the formerly existing quadrangle he was erroneously described as Sir Robert's brother: "These alms-houses were founded by Sir Robert Dennis, knight, in March 1591 and finished by Sir Thomas Dennis his brother (sic) in 1594". The tablet contains also a heraldic escutcheon sculpted in relief showing the following ten quarterings of the Dennis family. (Note: The quarterings are: 1. Dennis, 2. Dabernon, 3. Giffard of Halsbury in the parish of Parkham, Devon, an heiress of Dabernon, 4. Brewer, heiress of Giffard, 5. Bockerell, 6. Cristenstowe, 7. Gobodesley, 8. Chiderleigh, 9. Donne (or Dunne), 10. Godolphin. These quarterings can be seen clearly and with tinctures on the well-preserved monument in the private Rolle Mausoleum at Bicton to Denys Rolle (1614–1638), the son of Anne Denys, heiress of Bicton, with an added first quarter of Rolle, which has necessitated the omission of the last quarter of Godolphin.) The Dennis almshouses occupy the central part of Livery Dole to the west of the chapel.

=== Rolle family ===
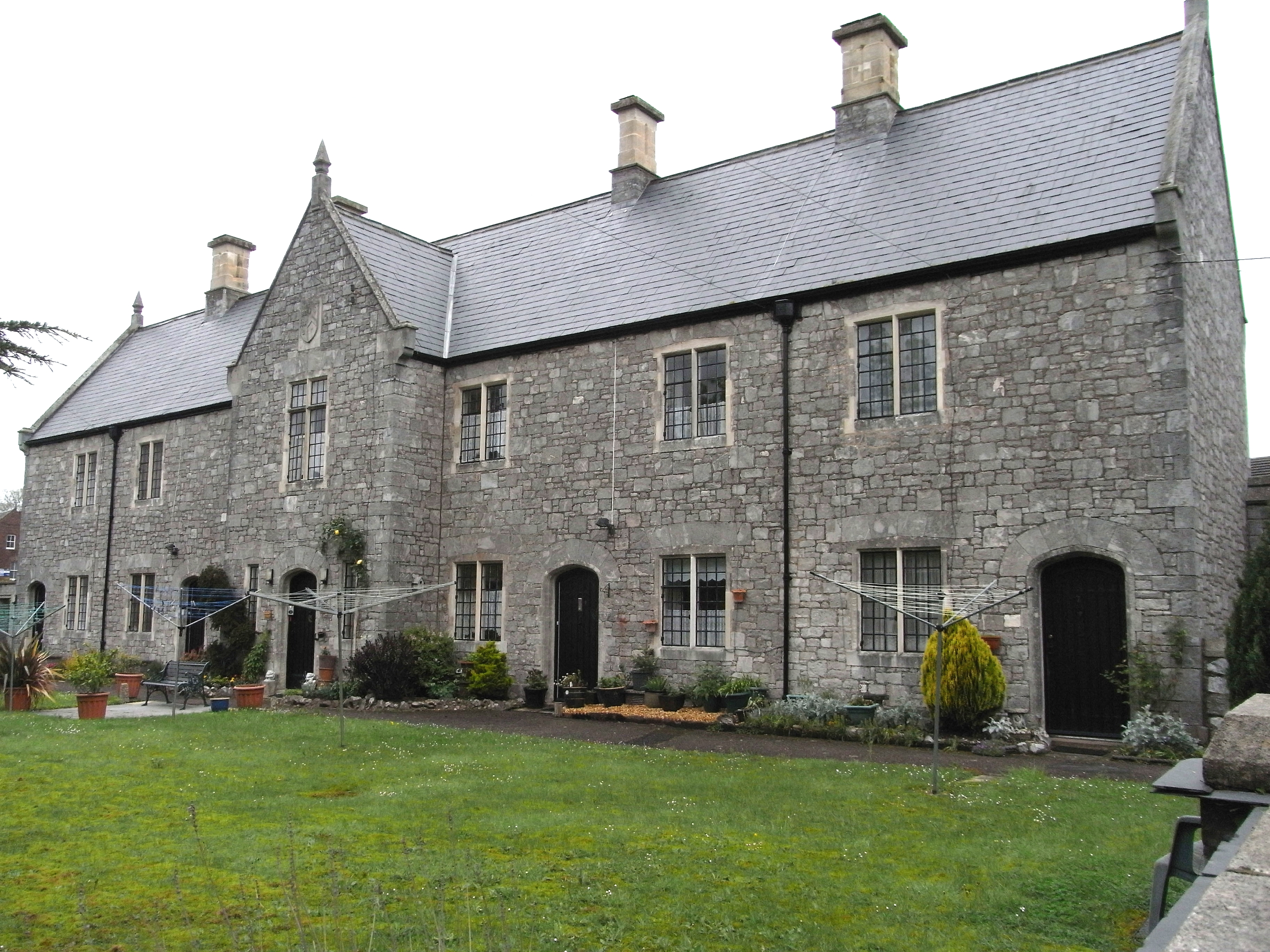
Livery Dole, Exeter. The westernmost of two identical blocks of six dwellings each erected by Lady Rolle in 1849. The escutcheon on the gable of the central entrance bay shows the arms of Rolle impaling Trefusis. Viewed from SE.

In the 17th century the Rolle family of Stevenstone was the heir of the Dennis family of Bicton. Henry Rolle, 1st Baron Rolle (1708–1750) left in his will an endowment to "The Hospital of Livery Dole". The almshouses were demolished and rebuilt in 1849 (Note: The date 1849 is shown on the cast-iron hopper heads to the gutters of the new almshouses, and heraldic escutcheons were added at that time to the gable-ends, showing the arms of Dennis, Rolle and Trefusis) by Louisa, Lady Rolle (1794–1885), nee Trefusis, daughter of Robert George William Trefusis, 17th Baron Clinton (1764–1797), and widow of John Rolle, 1st Baron Rolle (died 1842) of Bicton House. In his will Lord Rolle stipulated that "the patronage of the Livery Dole in Heavitree...shall be in the owner of my mansion house at Bicton", and he had left a life interest in that mansion to his widow. The original almshouses stood at the south-west side of the chapel, but the new buildings were positioned north-west of the chapel, which allowed space for lawns and gardens in front of them. Lady Rolle also rebuilt Bicton Church and Otterton Church. Following Lady Rolle's death in 1885 the patronage descended to Lord Rolle's residuary legatee, his widow's nephew Hon. Mark (Trefusis) Rolle (1836–1907), second son of Charles Trefusis, 19th Baron Clinton.

=== 20th century ===
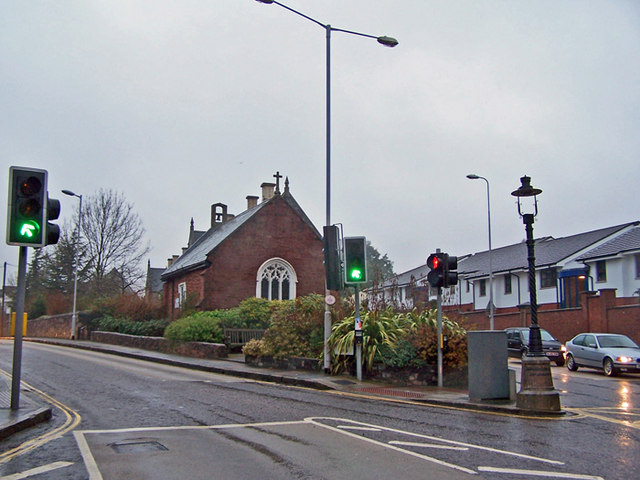
The General Gordon memorial lamp post in front of St Clare's Chapel

The windows of St Clarus's Chapel were destroyed by German bombing of Exeter in May 1942 during World War II. The chapel was restored by Mark Rolle's nephew and heir Charles Hepburn-Stuart-Forbes-Trefusis, 21st Baron Clinton (1863–1957). The east window was rebuilt by him in 1946, and some mediaeval stained glass roundels from a tower in the demolished old Church at Bicton were inserted into the side windows in 1947.

The almshouses were extended in 1980.

== General Gordon Memorial ==
At the apex of the Livery Dole triangle, where the two roads meet, was formerly situated a toll house. On that spot since 1885 and still standing today is a Victorian memorial lamp post bearing the inscription: "Charles George Gordon, 26th January 1885". It was erected in memory of General Gordon who was killed in the Siege of Khartoum in 1885, and paid for by Prebendary Barnes, vicar of Heavitree, who was a friend of the General's.

Arms related to the chapel and almshouses

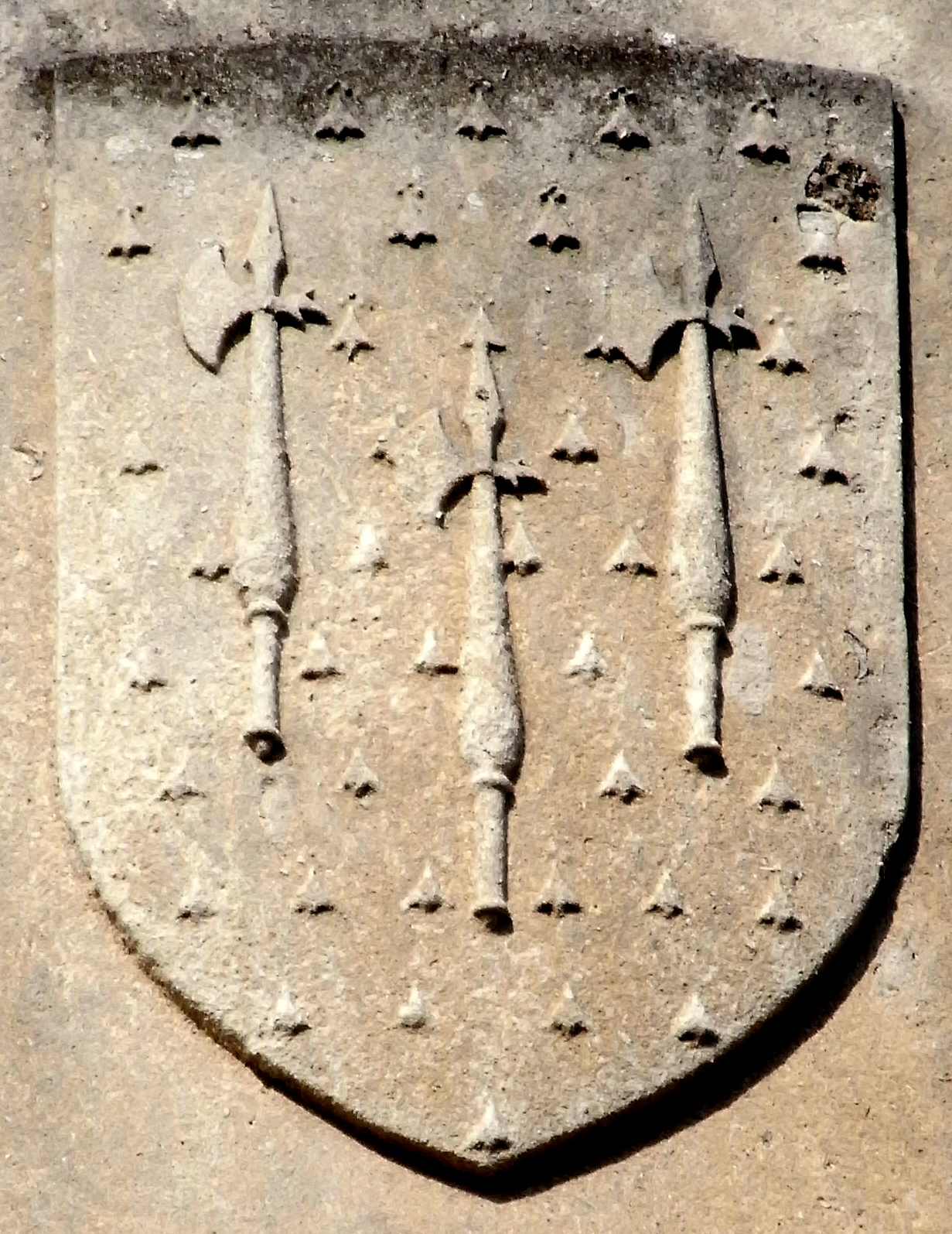
1849 sculpted escutcheon of arms of Denys of Holcombe Burnell & Bicton on the new Livery Dole Almshouses.

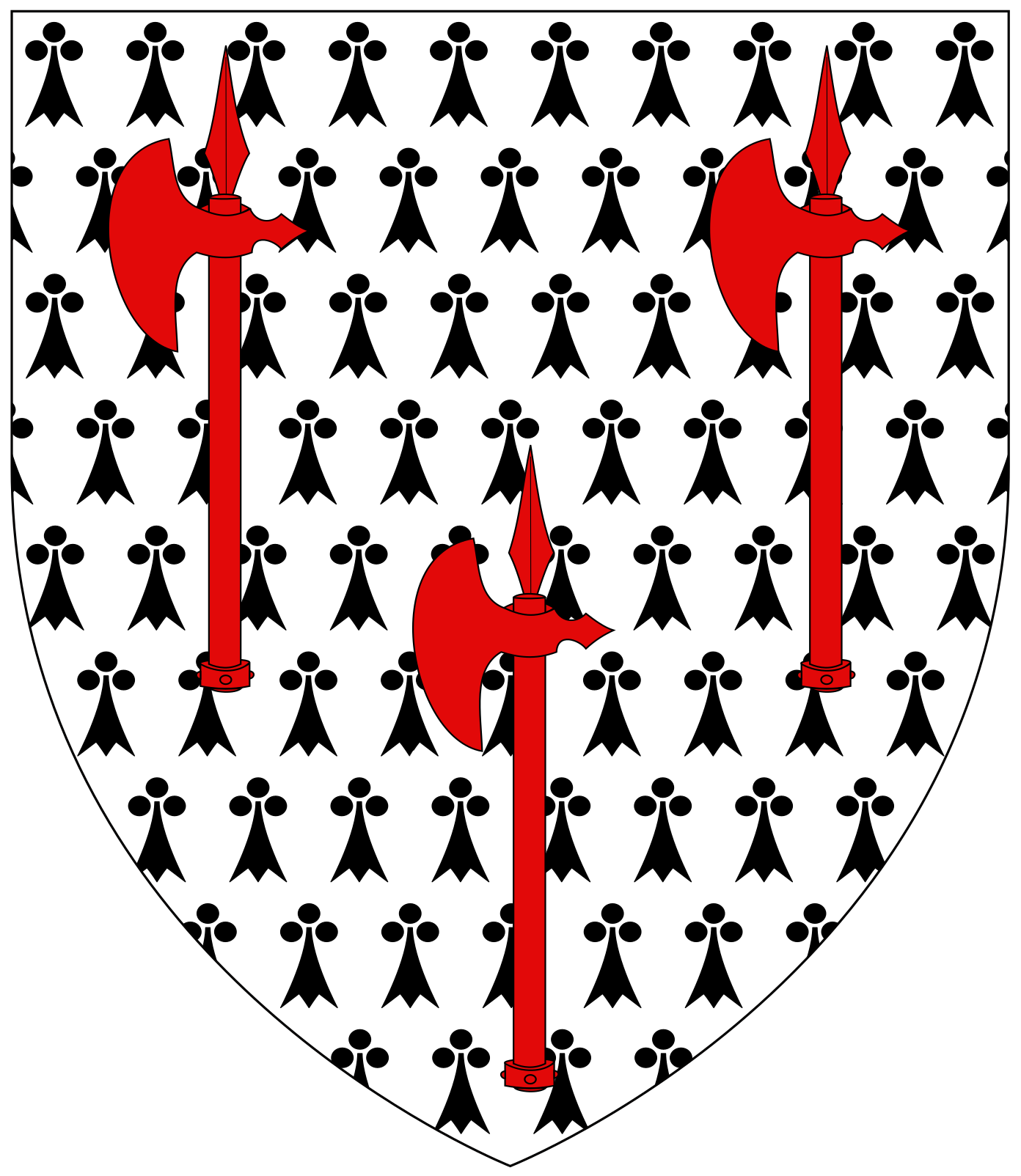
Arms of Denys: Ermine, three battle-axes gules

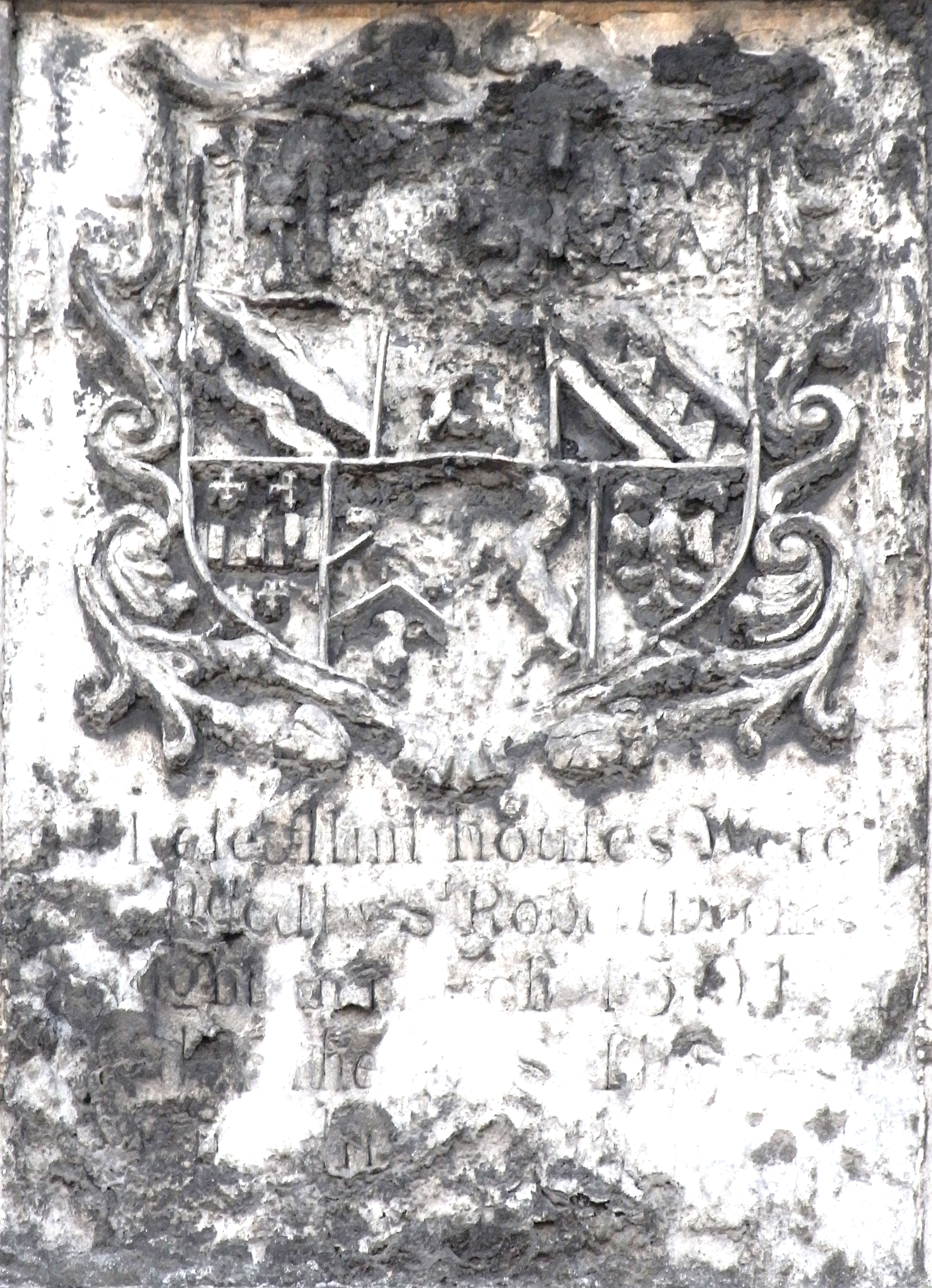
Stone tablet dedicated to Sir Robert Dennis, with Denys arms and quarterings above

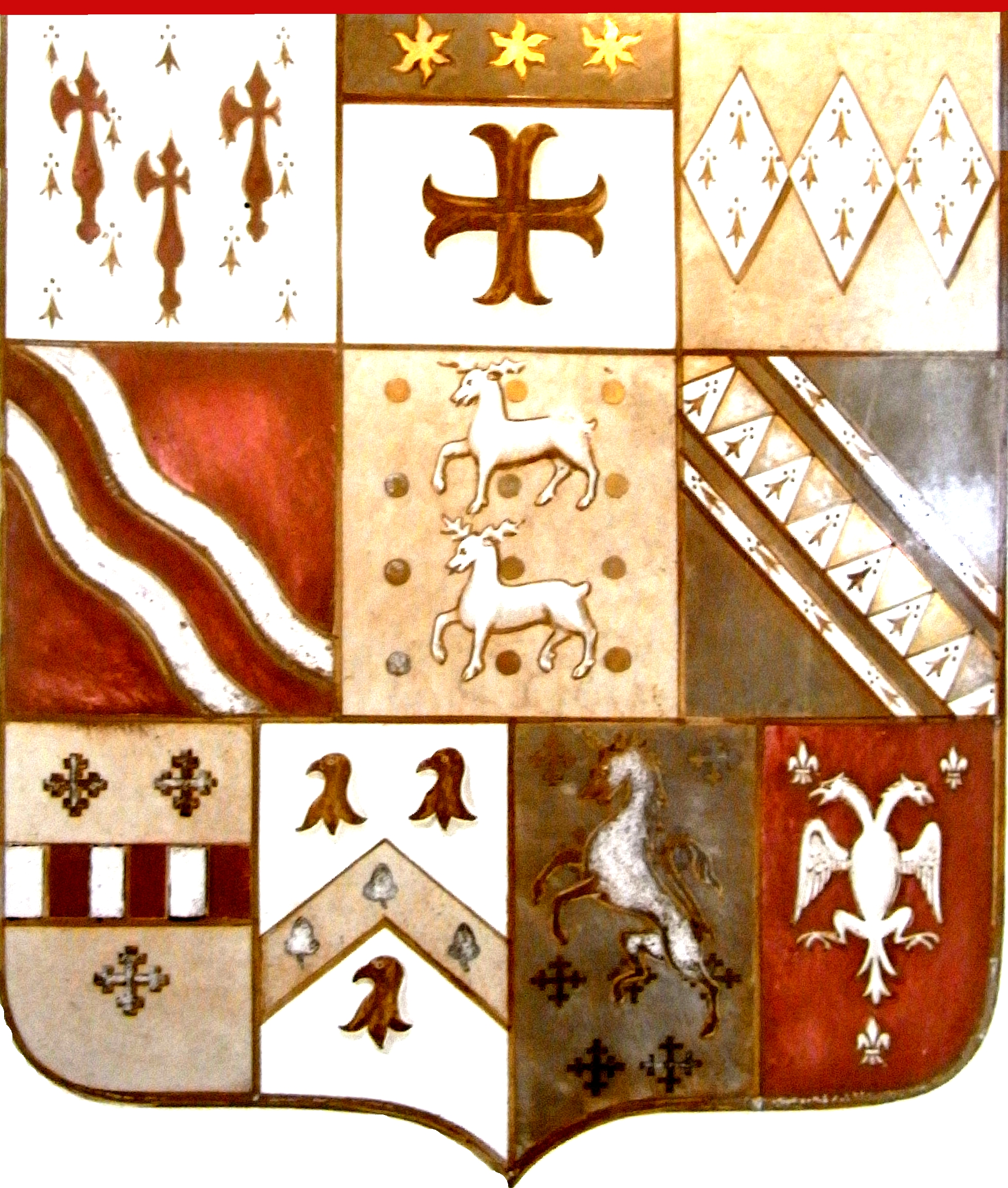
Heraldic quarterings of Sir Robert Dennis on stone escutcheon at Livery Dole

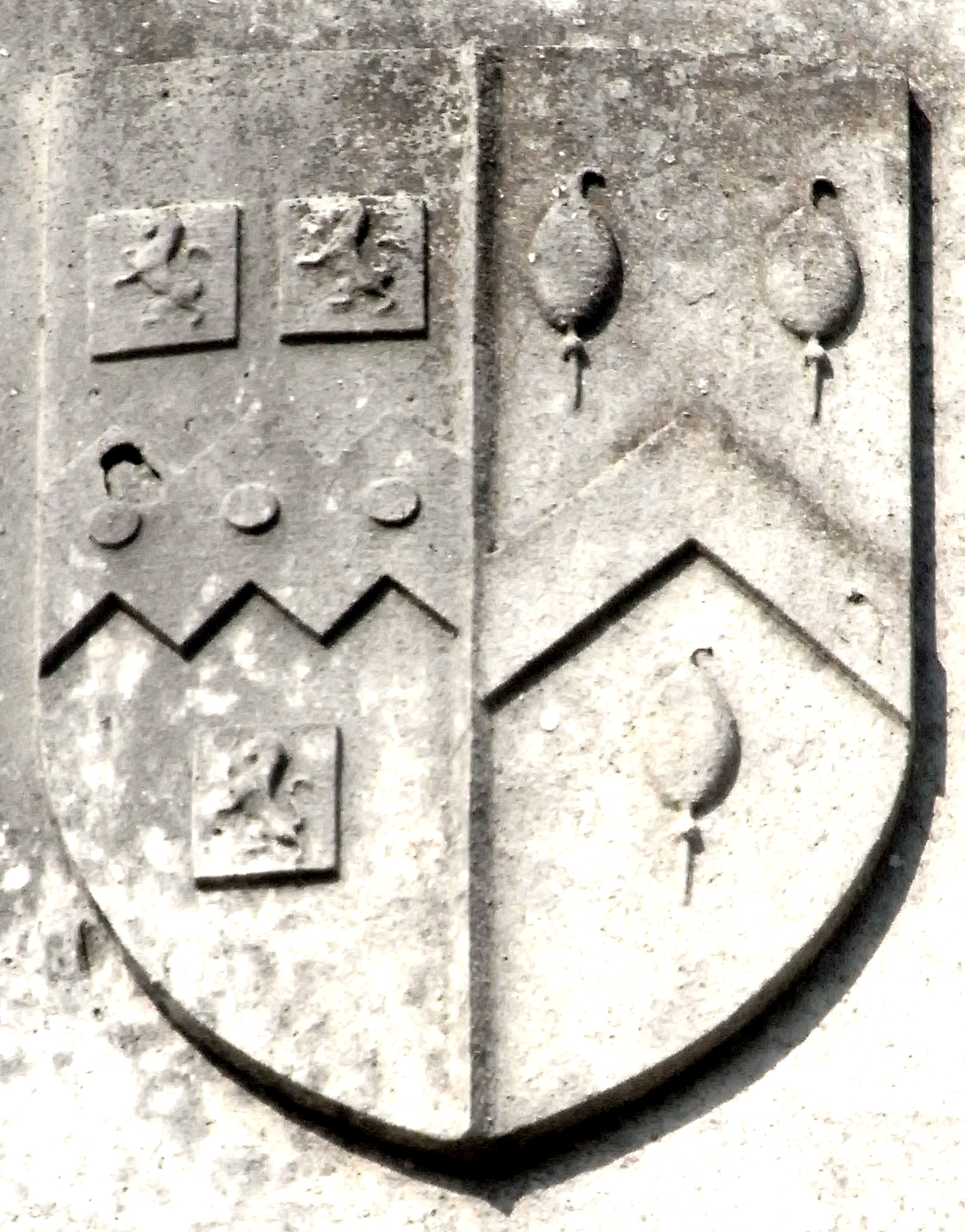
1849 sculpted escutcheon on the new Almshouses showing ...

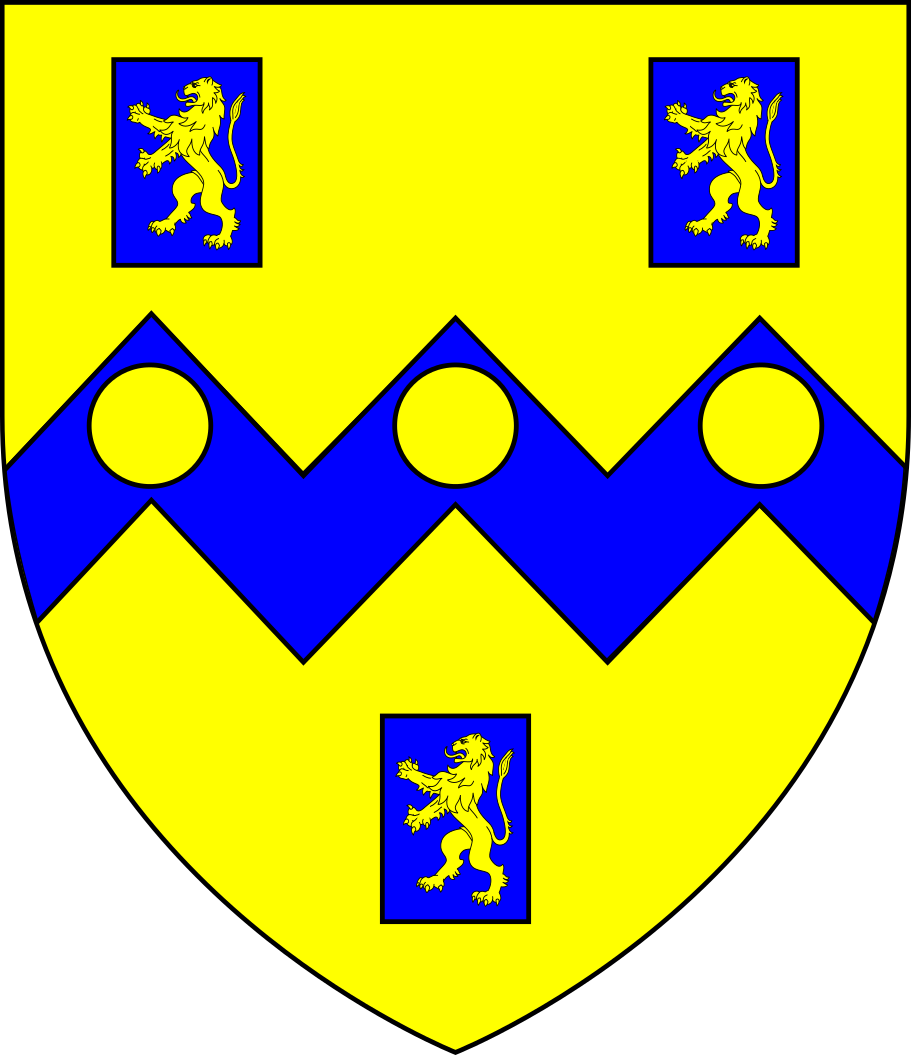
dexter: arms of Rolle, (Note: Blazoned as Or, on a fesse dancetté between three billets azure each charged with a lion rampant of the first three bezants.) impaling ...

sinister: arms of Trefusis. (Note: Blazoned as Argent, a chevron between three spindles sable. These are the arms used by Lord Rolle from the date of his second marriage until his death, here used by his widow.)
