= Thomas Benet (martyr) =

English Protestant martyr

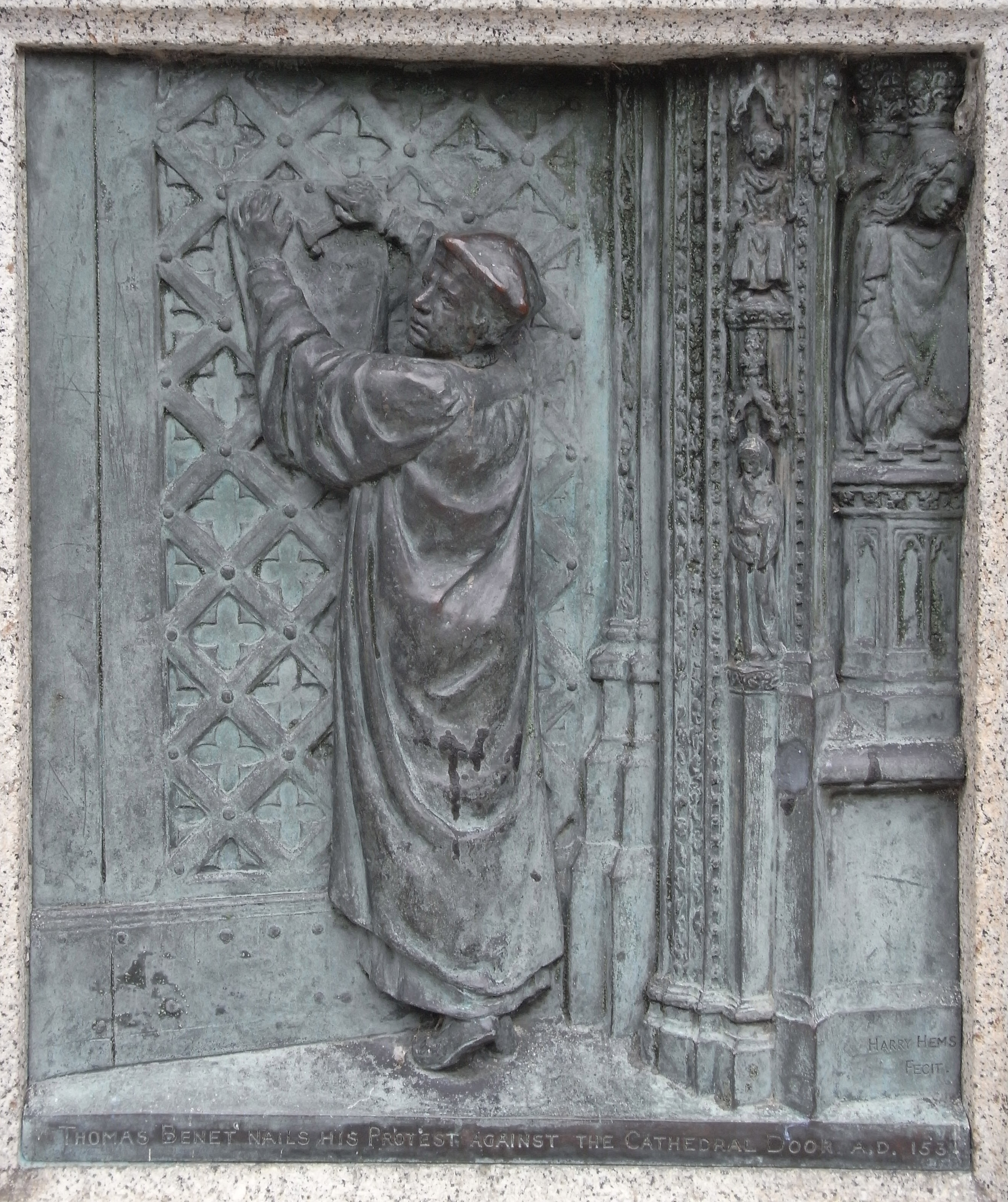
"Thomas Benet nails his protest against the Cathedral Door AD 1531". 1909 Bronze relief sculpted panel by Harry Hems showing heretical protest by Protestant martyr Thomas Benet which earned him martyrdom in 1531 at Livery Dole, Exeter. Affixed to the base of the Protestant Martyrs' Monument, Denmark Road, Exeter, Devon

Thomas Benet (died 1531) from Cambridge, was an English Protestant martyr during the reign of King Henry VIII. In 1524, he moved to Torrington, North Devon, with his wife and family so that he could exercise his religious conscience more freely in a county where no one knew him. He was executed by burning on 15 January 1531, for heresy, at Livery Dole outside Exeter in Devon, under the supervision of Sir Thomas Dennis (c. 1477-1561) of Holcombe Burnell, near Exeter, then Sheriff of Devon. (Nicholas Orme states that the posting of documents on and around Exeter Cathedral for which Benet was condemned took place in October 1530, and his execution consequently took place early the following year.)

He is said in Foxe's Book of Martyrs to have died with "his hands and eyes to heaven, saying 'Lord, receive my spirit!'". A memorial to him and his fellow martyr Agnes Prest, who was burned nearby for the same offence in 1557, was designed by Harry Hems and erected near the site of their martyrdom by public subscription in 1909.

== Denmark Road Protestant Martyrs' Memorial ==
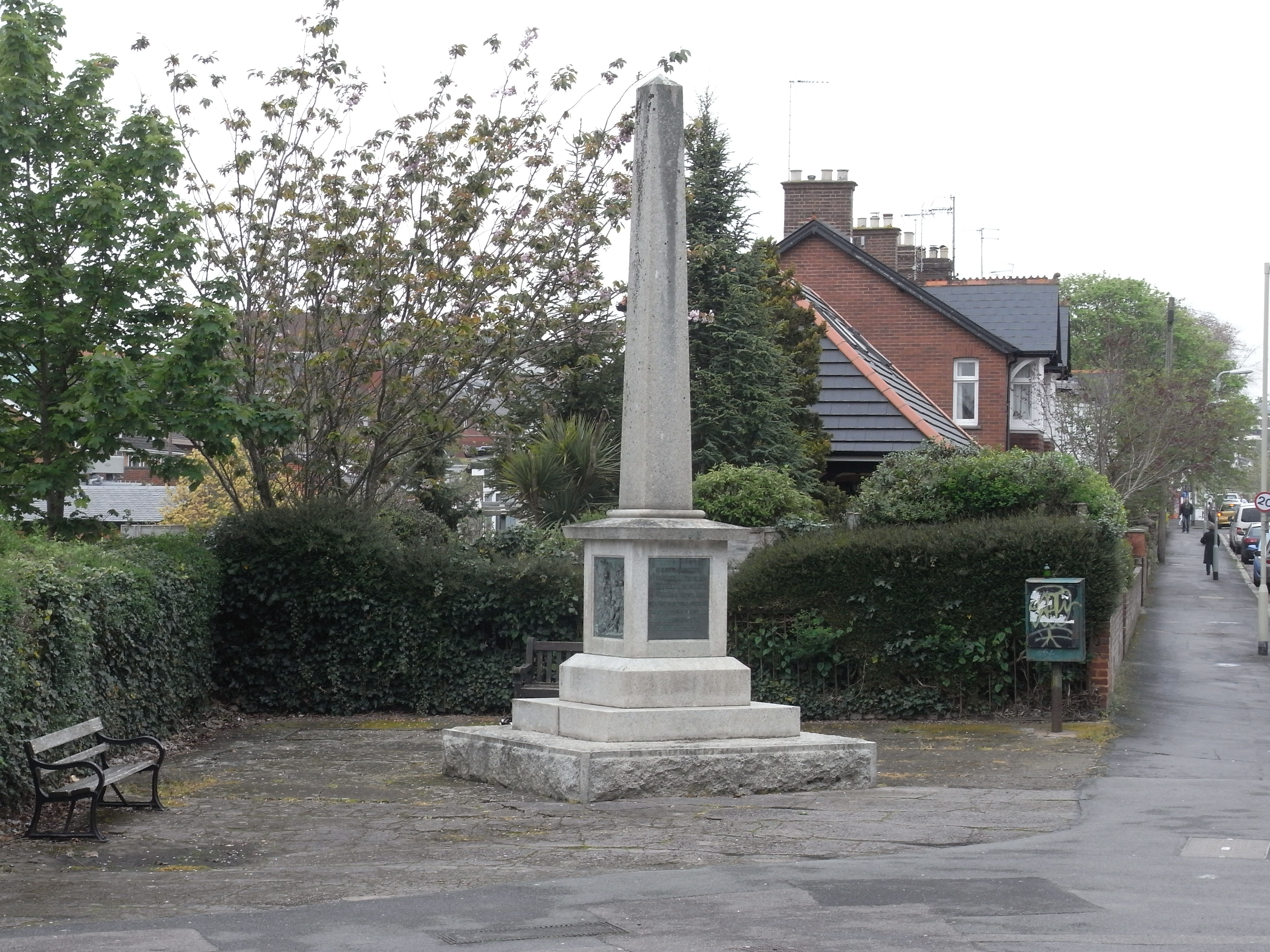
Protestant Martyrs' Monument, Denmark Road, Exeter, Devon. Erected 1909 in memory of the martyrs Thomas Benet (d.1531) and Agnes Prest (d.1557)

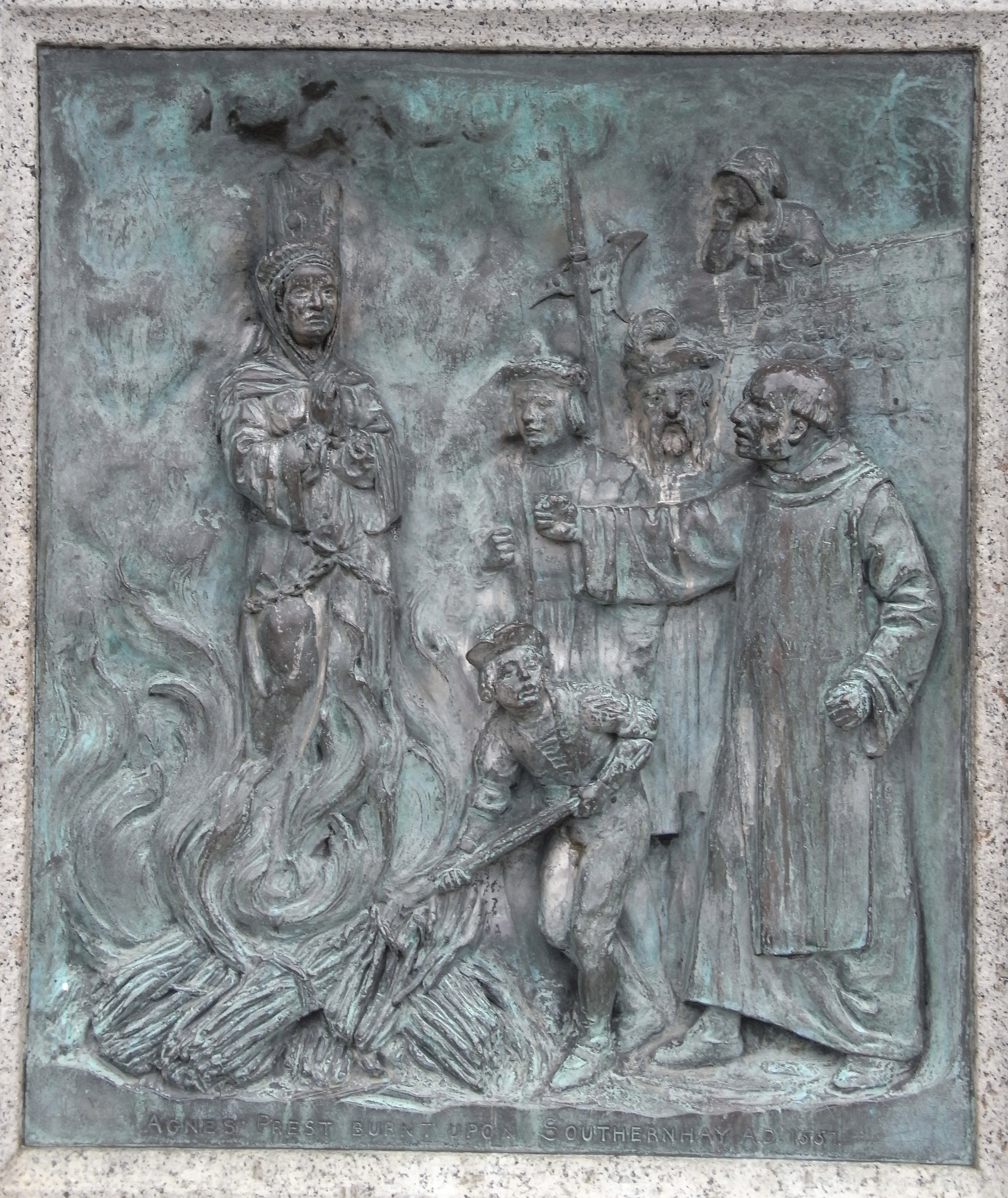
"Agnes Prest burnt upon Southernhay AD 1557". 1909 Bronze relief sculpted panel by Harry Hems showing burning at the stake of the Protestant martyr Agnes Prest in 1557, on the base of the Protestant Martyrs' Monument, Denmark Road, Exeter, Devon

In 1909 a monument in the form of an obelisk of Dartmoor granite was erected to Benet's memory in Denmark Road, Exeter, near Livery Dole. This monument was designed by Harry Hems and was erected with money raised through public subscription. It also commemorates the martyrdom of Agnes Prest who in 1557 was burnt for heresy at the stake in Southernhay. Two bronze sculpted relief panels by Harry Hems on the base of the obelisk depict Benet banging on the door of the Cathedral and Prest burning at the stake. The following inscriptions are contained on two bronze plaques affixed on opposite sides of the base:

In grateful remembrance of Thomas Benet, M.A. who suffered at Livery Dole A.D. 1531 for denying the supremacy of the Pope and of Agnes Prest who suffered on Southernhay A.D. 1557 for refusing to accept the doctrine of Transubstantiation. Faithful unto death.

And:

To the glory of God & in honour of his faithful witnesses who near this spot yielded their bodies to be burned for love to Christ and in vindication of the principles of the Protestant Reformation this monument was erected by public subscription AD 1909. They being dead yet speak.
