= Benjamin F. Livingston =

American politician

Benjamin F. Livingston (April 1841 – 1926) was a politician, grocer, and brick mason in the United States. An African American, he was born into slavery. After emancipation, he was appointed a County Commissioner for Jackson County, Florida, serving from 1868 until 1870. He served from 1871 until 1875 in the Florida House of Representatives representing Jackson County, Florida during the Reconstruction era. While there he voted for a civil rights bill in 1873.

In 1876 he was a delegate at the Republican Party's national convention. By 1877 he was reported to be living in Marianna, Florida. After serving in the Florida House of Representatives he became the Marianna postmaster for five years from 1880 until 1885. While the postmaster he was also a Marianna councilman from 1882 until 1884.

Livingston's 2-year-old son was killed in September 1869 during an assassination attempt on an African American constable who was escorting a church group. After 1900, Livingston and his remaining eight children moved to Bartow, Florida, where he died in 1926.

He is buried in Evergreen Cemetery in Bartow.
