= Phillip Papillon =

English politician (1660–1736)

Member of Parliament for Dover
- In office 1701–1720 Serving with Adm. Matthew Aylmer, Sir William Hardres, Bt
- Preceded by: Adm. Matthew Aylmer; Sir Charles Hedges
- Succeeded by: George Berkeley; Henry Furnese

Personal details
- Born: 26 November 1660 Fenchurch Street, London
- Died: 12 September 1736 (aged 75) Lee, London
- Spouse(s): Anne Joliffe (m. 1689; died 1693) Susannah Henshaw (m. 1695; died 1707)
- Relations: David Papillon (grandfather)
- Children: 8, including David
- Parent(s): Thomas Papillon; Jane Broadnax

Phillip Papillon (26 November 1660 – 12 September 1736), of Acrise Place, Kent, was an English merchant and politician who was a longtime Whig Member of Parliament for Dover.

== Early life ==
Papillon was born at Fenchurch Street, London on 26 November 1660. He was the eldest surviving son of prominent merchant Thomas Papillon (1623–1702), who served as a Commissioner for the Victualling of the Navy, and Jane (née Broadnax) Papillon (1627–1698).

His paternal grandparents were architect and military engineer David Papillon (who was born at Roehampton House) and, his second wife, Anne Marie (née Calandrini) Papillon. His maternal grandparents were Thomas Broadnax and Jane (née James) Broadnax.

== Career ==
Beginning in 1682, he was involved with his father's businesses. In the 1690s, he was Cashier to the Victualling Commissioners for the Royal Navy, while his father was a Commissioner. He was also a Member of Levant Company. Although he ran in the by-election of 1697, he was not returned as a Whig for Dover until 1701 at Secretary Sir Charles Hedges. He served until for nineteen years until December 1720, when he relinquished his seat before the end of Parliament to accept office as Receiver-General of Stamp Duties. His son, David, recaptured the Dover seat in 1734.

He succeeded to his father's estates in 1702 including the manor of Acrise in Kent, which his father had bought in 1666. In 1703, he purchased an old malt house in Last Lane which was leased to the Presbyterian congregation and converted into a chapel. He was detained in London after the end of the parliamentary session in July 1714, owing to the fatal illness of his brother-in-law, Sir Edward Ward, the Lord Chief Baron of the Exchequer (wife of his sister Elizabeth). Papillon was still dealing with his affairs when Queen Anne died on 1 August 1714.

== Personal life ==
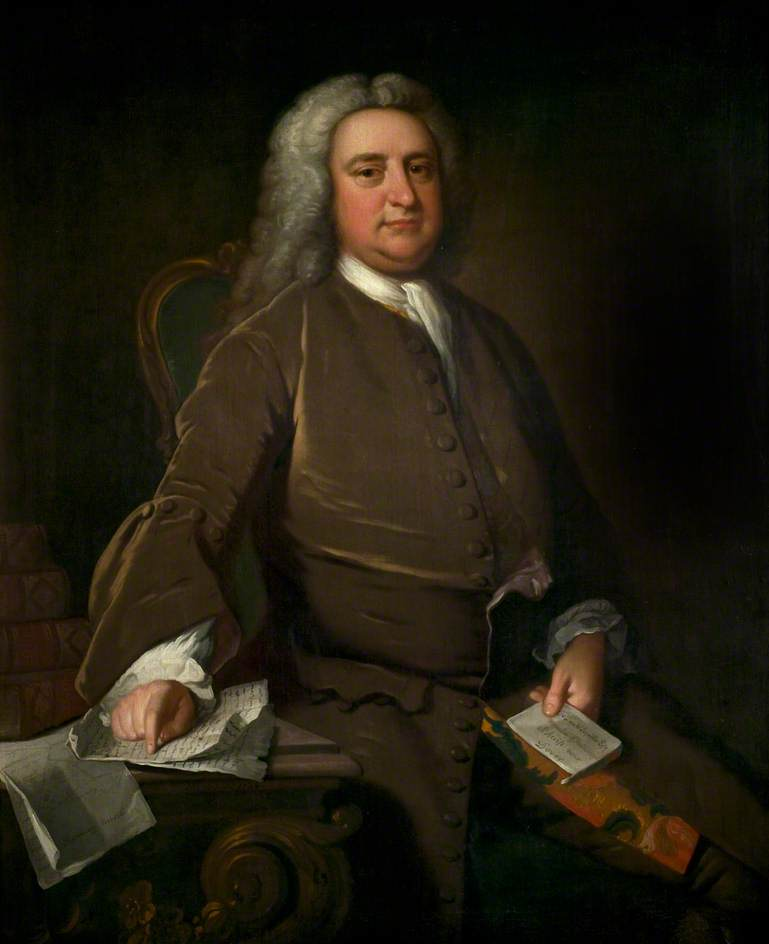
Portrait of his son, David Papillon by Isaac Whood, 1739

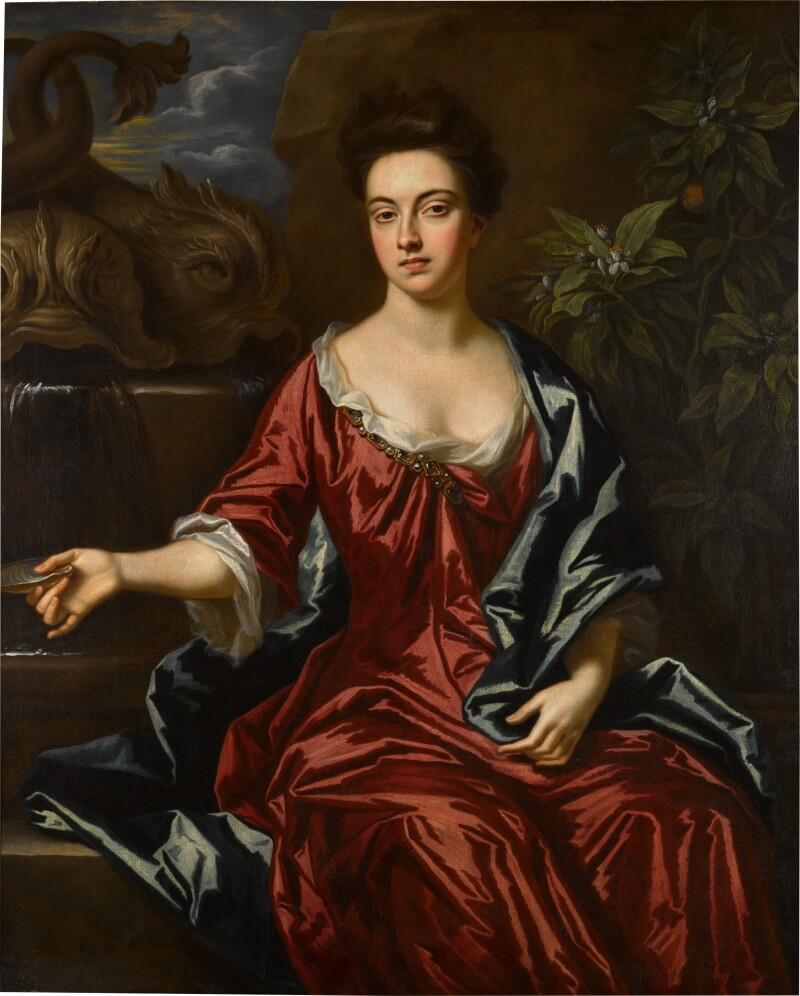
Portrait of his second wife, Susannah, by John Closterman

On 10 September 1689 Papillon was married to Anne Joliffe (d. 1693), a daughter of William Joliffe of Caverswall Castle, MP for Poole, and, his first wife, Martha (née Foley) Joliffe (a daughter of Thomas Foley of Witley Court). Her younger half-sister, Lucy Joliffe (whose mother was Lady Mary Hastings, a daughter of the 6th Earl of Huntingdon), married William Vane, 1st Viscount Vane. Before her death in 1693, they were the parents one son and two daughters, including:

- Jane Papillon (1690–1690), who died in infancy.
- David Papillon (1691–1762), an MP for New Romney and Dover; he married Mary Keyser, the daughter of London Merchant Timothy Keyser, in 1717. (Note: Through his son David, he was a direct ancestor of Philip Oxenden Papillon (1826–1899), an MP for Colchester.)
- Anne Papillon (1693–1694), who died in infancy.

In 1695, he remarried to Susannah Henshaw (d. 1707), a daughter of George Henshaw of Southwark St Saviour, a merchant and diplomat based in Genoa. Before her death in 1707, they were the parents of two sons and three daughters, including:

- Thomas Papillon (1696–1714), who died unmarried in Venice in 1714.
- Elizabeth Papillon (1697–1729), who died unmarried in 1729.
- Philip Papillon (1698–1746) of West Malling, who married Marianne de Salvert. After her death, he married Gabrielle de Nouleville.
- Susannah Papillon (b. 1700), who married John Gregory.
- Sarah Papillon (b. 1701), who died unmarried.

Papillon died in Lee, London on 12 September 1736 and was buried at Acrise. His daughter, Sarah, received his estate at Lee, while Acrise and his property in Dover went to his son, David.

Parliament of England
| Preceded by Adm. Matthew Aylmer; Sir Charles Hedges | Member of Parliament for Dover; 1701–1720; With: Adm. Matthew Aylmer (1701–1710); Sir William Hardres, Bt (1710–1715); Adm. Matthew Aylmer (1715–1720) | Succeeded by George Berkeley; Henry Furnese |
