= Aylmer =

Aylmer is a surname. Notable people with the surname include:

- Edward Aylmer, Welsh MP
- Edward Aylmer (cricketer), first-class cricketer and Royal Navy officer
- Felix Aylmer, English stage actor
- Sir Fenton Aylmer, 13th Baronet, British Army general and Victoria Cross recipient
- Frederick Whitworth Aylmer, 6th Baron Aylmer Royal Navy officer who penetrated the Gironde estuary in 1815
- George Aylmer, Irish officer of the Royal Navy who was killed at the Battle of Bantry Bay in 1689
- Jennifer Aylmer, American operatic soprano
- John Aylmer (bishop) (1521–1594), English bishop
- John Aylmer (classicist), Greek and Latin poet
- Matthew Aylmer, 1st Baron Aylmer
- Matthew Whitworth-Aylmer, 5th Baron Aylmer

As a forename, it may refer to:

- Aylmer Buesst, Australian conductor
- Aylmer Firebrace (1886–1972), British Royal Navy officer and fire chief
- Aylmer and Louise Maude, English translators
- Aylmer Vallance, Scottish newspaper editor

As a middle name, it may refer to:

- Udolphus Aylmer Coates, British town planner

== See also ==
- Aylmer baronets
- Baron Aylmer
- Aylmer, a character in Brain Damage
- A character in the short story "The Birth-Mark"
- Elmer (disambiguation)
- Ronald Aylmer Fisher, British statistician
- Lake Aylmer, Quebec, Canada
- Aylmer Lake, Northwest Territories, Canada
