= David Papillon =

British lawyer & politician (1691–1762)

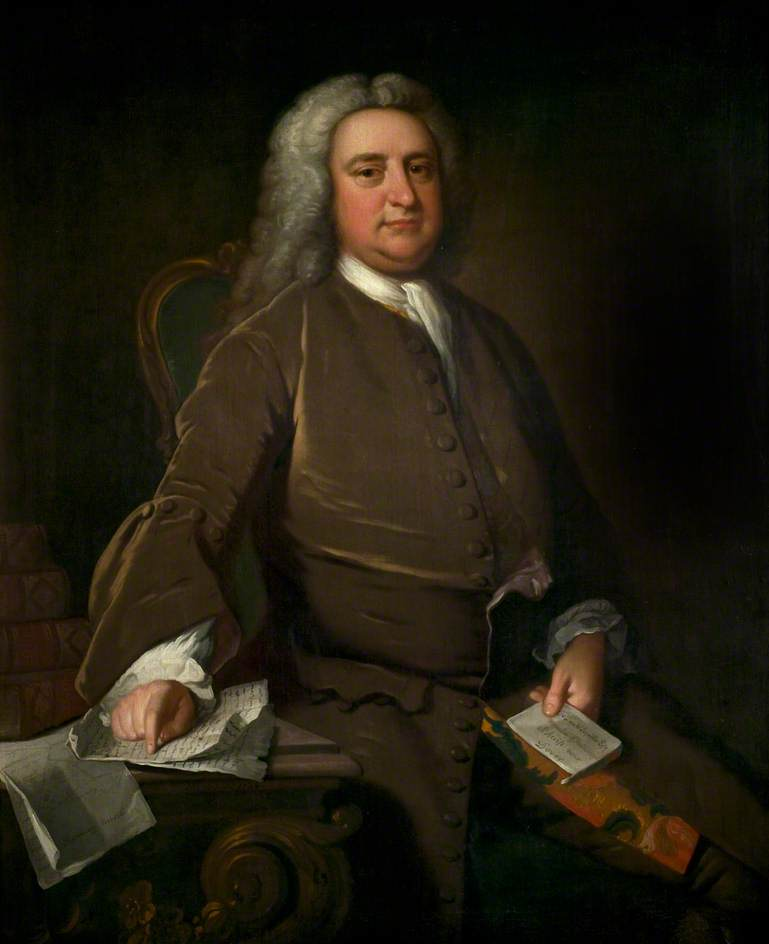
Portrait of Papillon by Isaac Whood, 1739

David Papillon FRS (1691 – 26 February 1762) of Acrise Place, Kent was a British lawyer and politician who sat in the House of Commons between 1722 and 1741.

== Early life ==
Papillon was the eldest son of Phillip Papillon of Acrise, MP for Dover, and his first wife Anne Jolliffe, daughter of William Joliffe of Caverswall Castle, Staffordshire. His paternal grandparents were Jane and Thomas Papillon.

He was educated at Morland's School, Bethnal Green, London and was admitted at the Inner Temple in 1706. He continued his studies in Utrecht from 1707 to 1709, before undertaking the Grand Tour in Germany in 1709. He was called to the bar in 1715.

== Career ==
He was elected a Fellow of the Royal Society in 1720.

Papillon was returned unopposed as Member of Parliament for New Romney at the 1722 British general election. He was returned at a contest at the 1727 British general election, but was unseated on petition on 29 April 1728. He regained the seat at a by-election on 13 May 1728 when one of the petitioners chose to sit elsewhere. At the 1734 British general election, he was returned in contests at both New Romney and Dover on the government interest and opted to sit for Dover. He gave up his seat at Dover to the Sackville family at the 1741 British general election, in return for appointment as Commissioner of excise from 1742.

He succeeded his father to Acrise Place in 1736. In 1744 he became a bencher of his Inn. He held his post with the excise until 1754 when he arranged for it to be transferred to his son, with the help of his schoolfellow and lifelong friend, Lord Hardwicke.

== Personal life ==
In 1717, he married Mary Keyser (1695–c. 1763), the daughter of London Merchant Timothy Keyser. Together, they were the parents of at least three sons and six daughters, including:

- Mary Papillon (1718–1756), who died unmarried.
- Anne Papillon (b. 1719), who married the Rev. Richard Jacob of East Malling in 1753.
- Sarah Papillon (b. 1720), who married the Rev. John Hardy Franklyn, Rector of Acrise, in 1763.
- Thomas Papillon (1721–1722), who died in infancy.
- William Papillon (c. 1722–1722), who died in infancy.
- Philip Papillon (1723–1737), who died young.
- Elizabeth Papillon (1724–1786), who married, as his second wife, the Rev. Dr. Thomas Curteis, Rector of Sevenoaks, in 1748.
- Susannah Papillon (b. 1726), who married Arthur Weaver of Bridgnorth in 1754. He died in 1759 and she married Ogilvie.
- David Papillon (1729–1809), who married Bridget Turner, a daughter of William Turner, St Giles, Camberwell, in 1753. After her death in 1770, he married his step-niece, Esther (née Curteis) Hardy, widow of the Rev. Edward Hardy and daughter of Rev. Dr. Thomas Curteis of Sevenoaks.
- Jane Papillon (1731–1731), who died young.

He died 26 February 1762 leaving three sons and six daughters.

Parliament of Great Britain
Preceded by Robert Furnese; Viscount Sondes	Member of Parliament for New Romney; 1722–1734; With: Robert Furnese 1722–1727; John Essington 1727–1728; Sir Robert Austen 1728–1734	Succeeded by Stephen Bisse; Sir Robert Austen
Preceded by George Berkeley; Henry Furnese	Member of Parliament for Dover; 1734–1741; With: Thomas Revell	Succeeded by Lord George Sackville; Thomas Revell
