= Hardres =

Hardres may refer to:

== People ==
- Hardres baronets
- John Hardres, MP for Canterbury
- Thomas Hardres (1610–1681), English barrister and politician
- Sir William Hardres, 4th Baronet (1686–1736), British politician
- Sir Hardres Waller

== Places ==
- Lower Hardres, a village and civil parish near Canterbury, Kent, England
- Upper Hardres, a village and civil parish near Canterbury, Kent, England
