= Henry Aylmer =

Henry Aylmer may refer to:

- Henry Aylmer (Canadian politician) (1843–1918), Canadian soldier and politician
- Henry Aylmer, 2nd Baron Aylmer (c. 1694–1754), British Whig politician
- Henry Aylmer, 3rd Baron Aylmer (1718–1766), Royal Navy officer
