= William Joliffe =

English politician (c.1622–1712)

The Right Honourable William Joliffe JP

Member of Parliament for Poole
- In office 1698–1705 Serving with Sir William Phippard
- Preceded by: Lord Ashley; Sir Nathaniel Napier
- Succeeded by: Samuel Weston; Sir William Phippard

Personal details
- Born: c. 1622
- Died: 1712
- Spouse(s): Martha Foley (m. 1659; died 1667) Lady Mary Hastings (m. 1670; died 1678) Elizabeth Trenchard Every (m. 1686; died 1694)
- Relations: David Papillon (grandson); William Vane, 2nd Viscount Vane (grandson)
- Children: Anne Papillon; Lucy, Viscountess Vane
- Parent(s): William Joliffe; Anne Webb

William Joliffe JP (c. 1622 – 1712) was an English merchant and politician who served as Member of Parliament for Poole from 1698 to 1705.

== Early life ==
Joliffe was born in c. 1622 into a family that had been mercers in Leek, Staffordshire since the mid-15th century. He was the third, but second surviving, son of William Joliffe of Botham Hall, Cheddleton, Staffordshire, and Anne Webb, a daughter of Benedict Webb of Kingswood, Gloucestershire. His father, who held office during the Interregnum, added considerably to their estates by the acquisition of Botham Hall and Caverswall Castle.

== Career ==
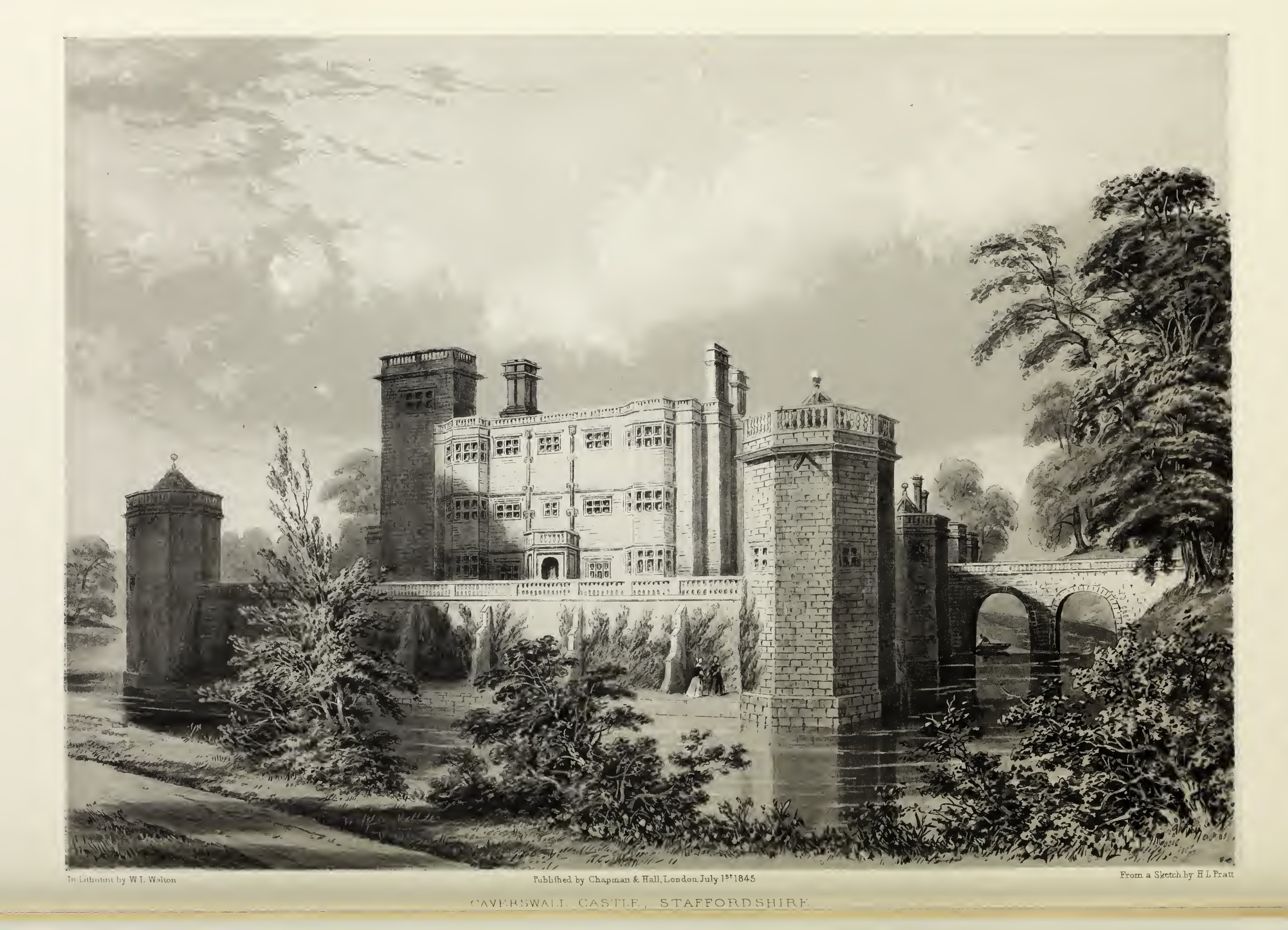
Caverswall Castle, 1845

A merchant and member of The Mercers' Company by 1659; he was an alderman of London from 1687 to 3 October 1688. He served as Sheriff of Staffordshire from 14 to 21 December 1691, and again from 1692.

In 1698 he stood at Poole on the Trenchard interest and was returned after a contest. Upon his father's death in 1699, he succeeded to Caverswall Castle. He was a Director of the New East India Company from 1700 to 1701.

At the end of his time in Parliament in 1705, he retired from politics and trade. In 1707 he was appointed a Justice of the Peace for Surrey by Lord Cowper.

== Personal life ==
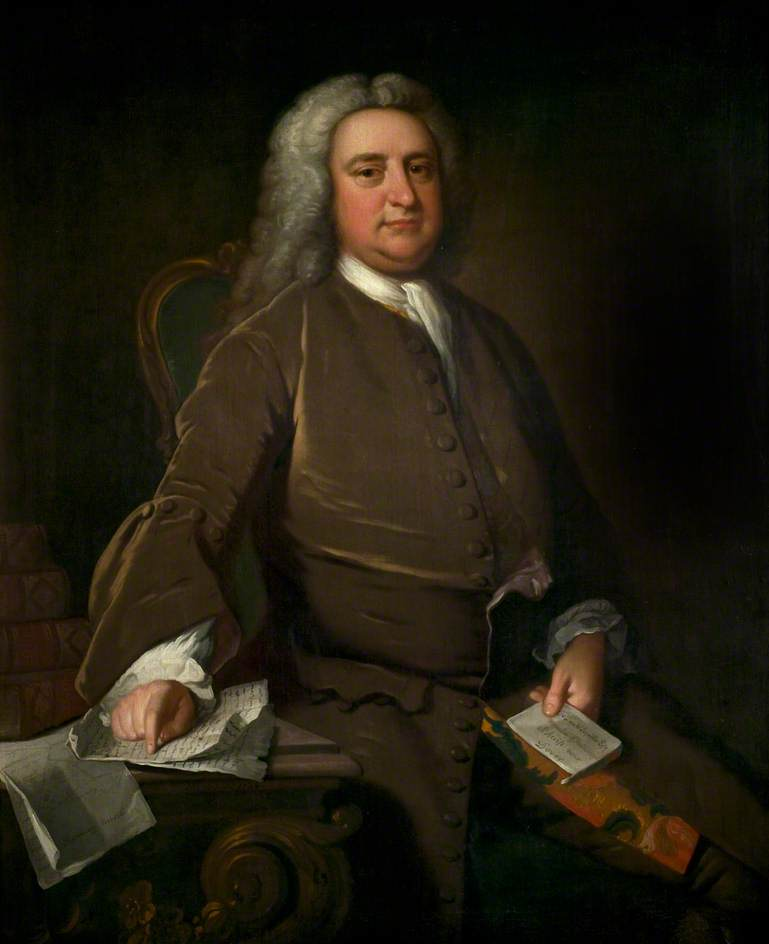
Portrait of his grandson, David Papillon, by Isaac Whood, c. 1725

On 23 May 1659 in London, Joliffe married Martha Foley (d. 1667), a daughter of Thomas Foley of Witley Court, Worcestershire, and sister of Thomas Foley, Paul Foley, and Philip Foley. Before her death in 1667, they were the parents of one daughter:

- Anne Joliffe (c. 1667–1693), who married Philip Papillon, MP for Dover and son of Thomas Papillon, in 1689.

In 1670, Joliffe married, secondly, to Lady Mary Hastings (d. 1678), a daughter of Ferdinando Hastings, 6th Earl of Huntingdon and Lucy Davies (a daughter of poet Sir John Davies). Before her death in 1678, they were the parents of another daughter:

- Lucy Joliffe (c. 1676–1742), who married William Vane, the second surviving son of Christopher Vane, 1st Baron Barnard and Lady Elizabeth Holles (a daughter of the 3rd Earl of Clare and the sister of the 1st Duke of Newcastle), in 1703.

By license dated 28 October 1686, Joliffe married, thirdly, to Elizabeth (née Trenchard) Every (d. 1694), a daughter of Thomas Trenchard of Wolveton, Dorset (son of Sir Thomas Trenchard), and widow of John Every of Wootton Glanville, Dorset, MP for Bridport. She was also sister of Sir John Trenchard.

Joliffe died in 1712 and was buried at Caverswall on 19 January 1712. Most of his Staffordshire and Cheshire property went to his daughter, Lucy.

=== Descendants ===
Through his elder daughter Anne, he was a grandfather of David Papillon (1691–1762), an MP for New Romney and Dover who married Mary Keyser, the daughter of Timothy Keyser, a London Merchant.

Through his younger daughter Lucy, he was the grandfather of three, including William Vane, 2nd Viscount Vane (1714–1789), who married Frances, Lady William Hamilton (who was previously married to the 4th Duke of Hamilton's second son, Lord William Hamilton).

Parliament of England
Preceded by Lord Ashley; Sir Nathaniel Napier	Member of Parliament for Poole with Sir William Phippard; 1698–1705	Succeeded by Samuel Weston; Sir William Phippard
