= Papillon Hall, Lubenham =

House in England

Coordinates: 52.4757°N 0.9872°W

Papillon Hall was a house in Lubenham, Market Harborough, England that was built in about 1620 and demolished in 1950.

== Building ==
Papillon Hall was built in about 1620 by David Papillon (1581-1659), a French Huguenot architect and military engineer. It was an octagonal two-storey stone house surrounded by a moat.

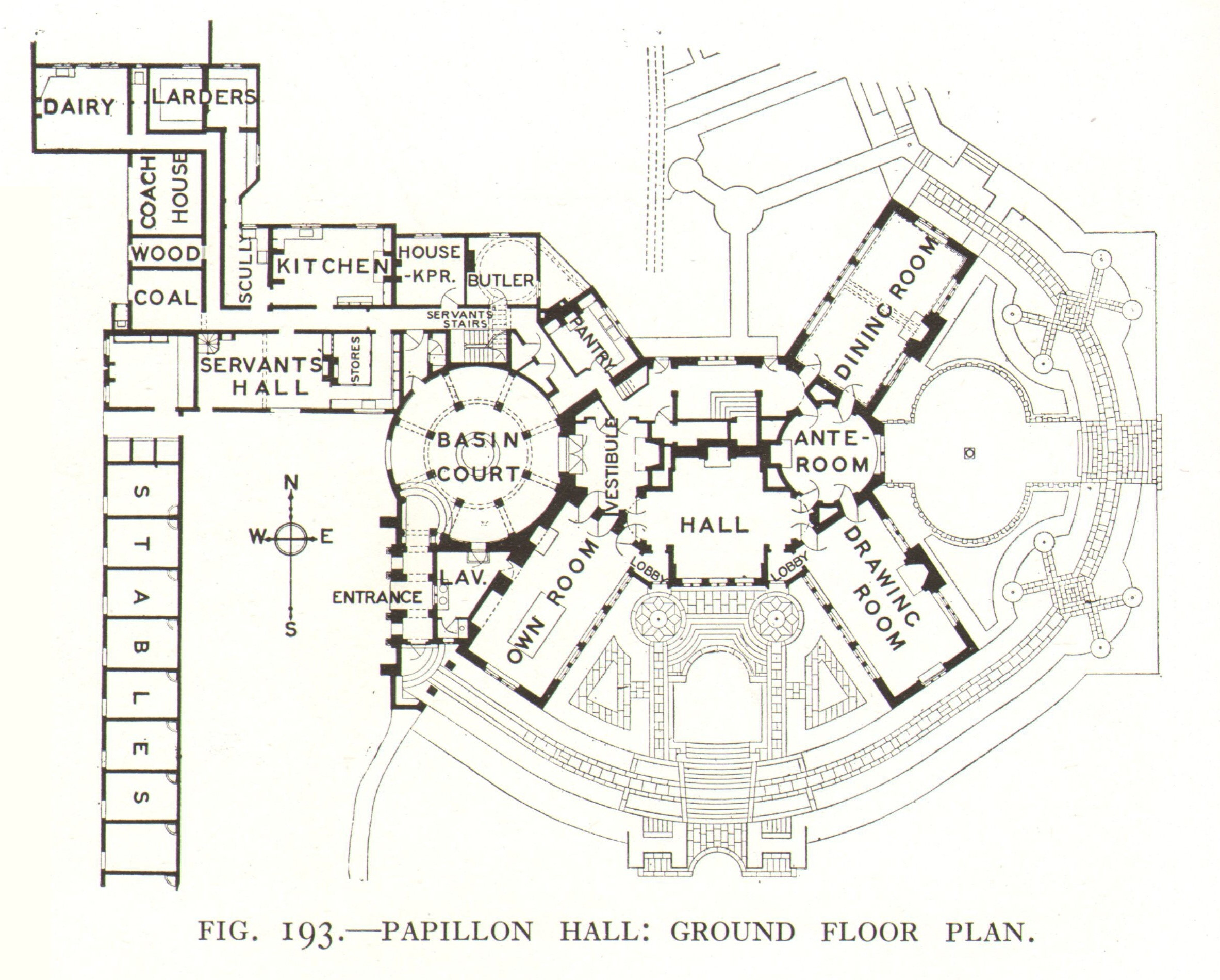
Papillon Hall Ground Floor Plan

In about 1903, Sir Frank Bellville had the hall restructured by the architect Sir Edwin Lutyens. The building was set-out in a butterfly plan. (Papillon is the French word for butterfly.) The original hall was retained at the centre of the design, and an extra storey added to it. The original hall contained the entrance hall and a sitting room. The four new wings, built in the shape of butterfly wings, incorporated a dining room, billiard room, kitchen and servants hall. To the east and west were two circular structures, the ante-room and the Basin Court. The court, open to the air, connected the main part of the house with the kitchen and servants' quarters, and had a Tuscan colonnade.

Papillon Hall was requisitioned by the army during the Second World War, and used as a billet for the 319th Glider Field Artillery Battalion of the 82nd Airborne Division of the US Army. It was demolished in 1950.

The garden house, wall and attached pillar, that formed part of the garden, were built as part of the 1903 renovations and were listed as grade II buildings on 7 September 1995. In 2013, a survey was completed of the former gardens. In addition to the listed structures, there was a lily pond, summerhouse, some walls, and the remains of a greenhouse. The stables and outbuildings are now used as farm buildings.

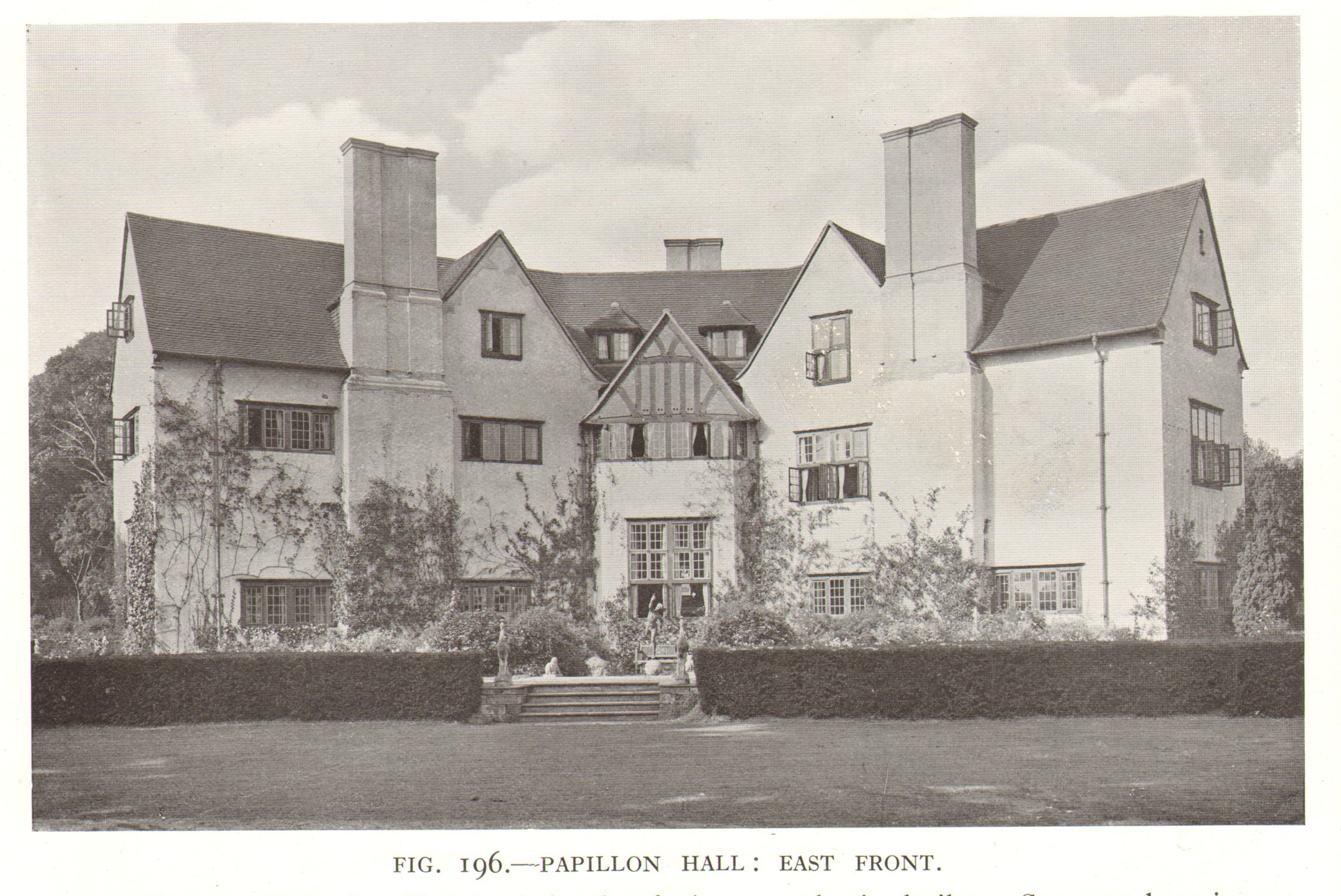
East front

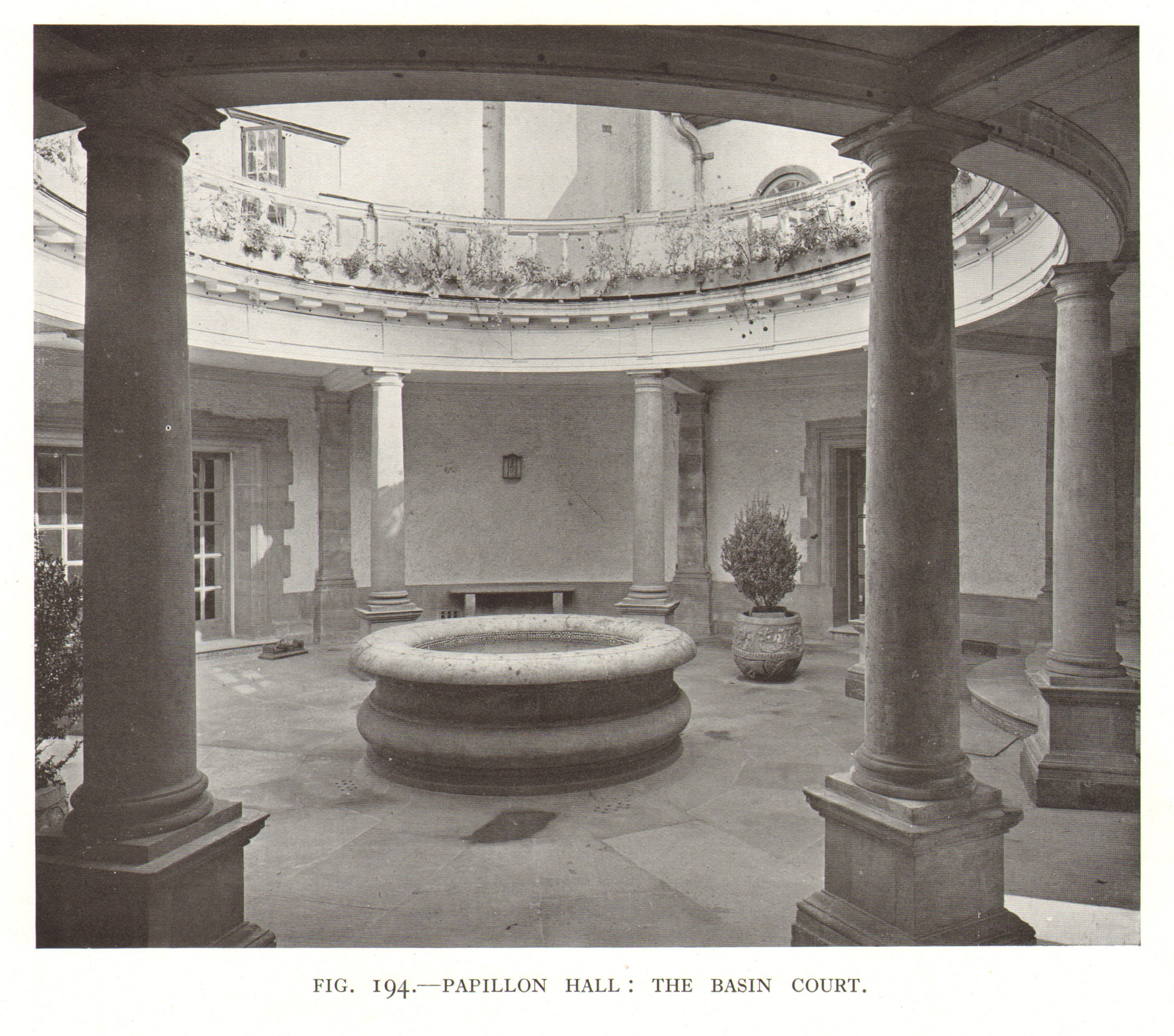
Basin Court

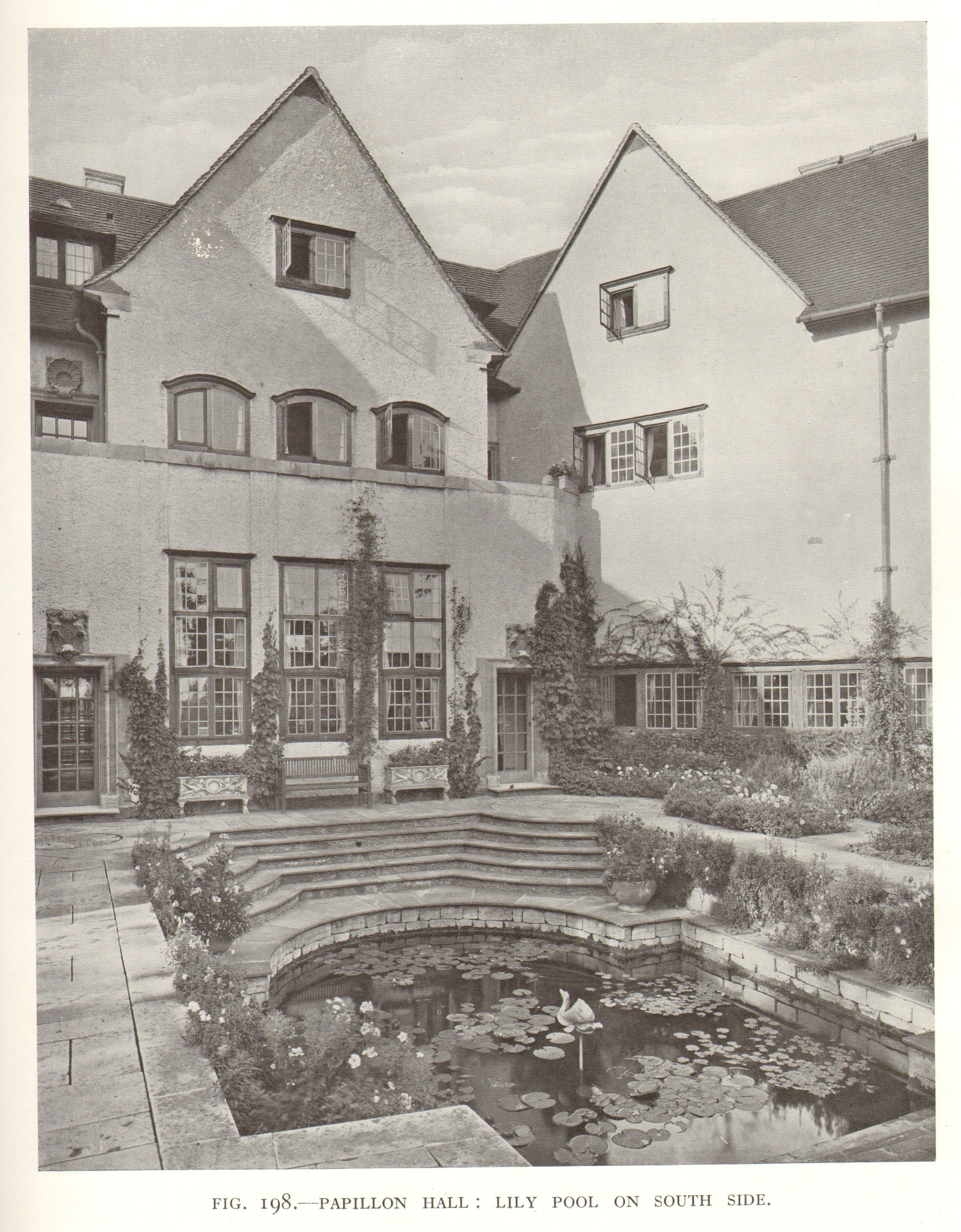
Lily Pool

== The cursed brocade shoes ==
David Papillon (1691-1762) was known by local people as 'Pamp'. David Papillon was reputed to have had a Spanish mistress who lived in the hall but never left it. The mistress died in mysterious circumstances in about 1715, but there are no records of her death. She is associated with the body of a woman who was found within an attic wall during the 1903 renovations. Before her death, the mistress cursed that anyone who moved the brocade shoes would suffer ill-fate.

During the 1903 renovation work, Sir Frank Bellville had the brocade shoes removed from the house to his solicitor's office. Shortly afterwards, Sir Frank was thrown from a pony and trap and suffered a broken skull. The brocade shoes were returned to the hall and are now owned by the Harborough Museum, Market Harborough.
