= Elmer (disambiguation) =

Elmer is a given name and surname.

Elmer may also refer to:

== Places ==
In the United Kingdom:

- Elmer, West Sussex

In the United States:

- Elmer Township, Oscoda County, Michigan
- Elmer Township, Sanilac County, Michigan
- Elmer, Minnesota
- Elmer Township, Pipestone County, Minnesota
- Elmer Township, St. Louis County, Minnesota
- Elmer, Missouri
- Elmer, New Jersey
- Elmer, Oklahoma

== Other uses ==
- Elmer Candy Corporation
- Elmer (crater), a crater on the Moon
- 2493 Elmer, a small Solar System body
- Elmer (comics), a Filipino comic by Gerry Alanguilan
- Elmer (ham radio), an established radio amateur who helps newcomers
- Elmer (robot), an educational robot built by W. Grey Walter
- Elmer's Products, Inc., makers of Elmer's Glue-All and other glues in the United States
- Elmer FEM solver, an open-source Finite Element Method tool
- Elmer the Patchwork Elephant, a children's book by David McKee
- ELMER guidelines, for public forms on the Internet
- El Morocco or Elmer, a former nightclub in New York City
- Aylmer, or Elmer, the monster in the film Brain Damage

== See also ==
- Elmer Food Beat, a Breton rock group
- Elmer Fudd, a Looney Tunes fictional character, archenemy of Bugs Bunny
- PerkinElmer, an American technology company
- Aylmer, a surname
