= John Aylmer =

John Aylmer may refer to:

- John Aylmer (bishop) (1521–1594), English bishop, constitutionalist and Greek scholar
- John Aylmer (classicist) (died 1672), Greek and Latin poet
- John Aylmer (politician) (1652–1705), Irish MP
- Jack Aylmer (John Francis Aylmer, 1934–2018), American politician and college president
