= Stephen Bisse =

Stephen Bisse (c. 1672 – 1746), of Wimbledon, Surrey, was a British merchant and Whig politician who sat in the House of Commons between 1715 and 1741. He was associated with the Victualling Office for most of his life.

Bisse was baptized on 23 January 1672, the son. of George Bisse of Martock, Somerset, and his wife. Mary. He married, by licence dated 18 December 1697, Elizabeth Goldsmith, daughter of Thomas Goldsmith

In 1701, Bisse was a junior clerk to the accountant general of the Navy victualling office. He was appointed agent victualler of the Navy at Lisbon on 31 January 1704 and was strongly recommended for his services there by Admiral Sir Cloudesley Shovell in December 1706. He was still at Lisbon in 1711. At the 1715 British general election, he was returned as Member of Parliament for Great Bedwyn, when he was said to be offering £6 a vote. He voted with the Government in every recorded division. Also in 1715 he was appointed Commissioner of the Equivalent which he held until 1719. He lost his Parliamentary seat at the 1722 British general election but was appointed Commissioner for victualling the navy in that year. In about 1724, he was appointed a clerk of the crown in Chancery. He lost his post in the Victualling office in 1727, but in 1732 was appointed senior agent victualler at Lisbon. He also became a Director of the East India Company from 1732 to 1733. In 1734 he accepted with reluctance the post of senior Commissioner for victualling, complaining to Walpole that it was a regression to a former post rather than the promotion he expected. Nevertheless, he retained the post for the rest of his life. At the 1734 British general election, he was returned as MP for New Romney. From 1735 to 1741 he was a director of the East India Company again. In Parliament, he voted with the Government on the Spanish convention in 1739. He was defeated at New Romney at the 1741 British general election.

Bisse lived at Wimbledon House on Parkside, Wimbledon, which he leased. He died without issue on 9 September 1746, said to be immensely rich. His fortune was inherited by his nephew Bisse Richards.

Parliament of Great Britain
Preceded by Thomas Millington; Sir Edward Seymour	Member of Parliament for Great Bedwyn; 1715–1722; With: William Sloper	Succeeded by Robert Bruce; Charles Longueville
Preceded by Sir Robert Austen; David Papillon	Member of Parliament for New Romney; 1734–1741; With: David Papillon; Sir Robert Austen	Succeeded by Henry Furnese; Sir Francis Dashwood
