= Matthew Aylmer, 1st Baron Aylmer =

Royal Navy officer and politician

Admiral of the Fleet The Right Honourable The Lord Aylmer
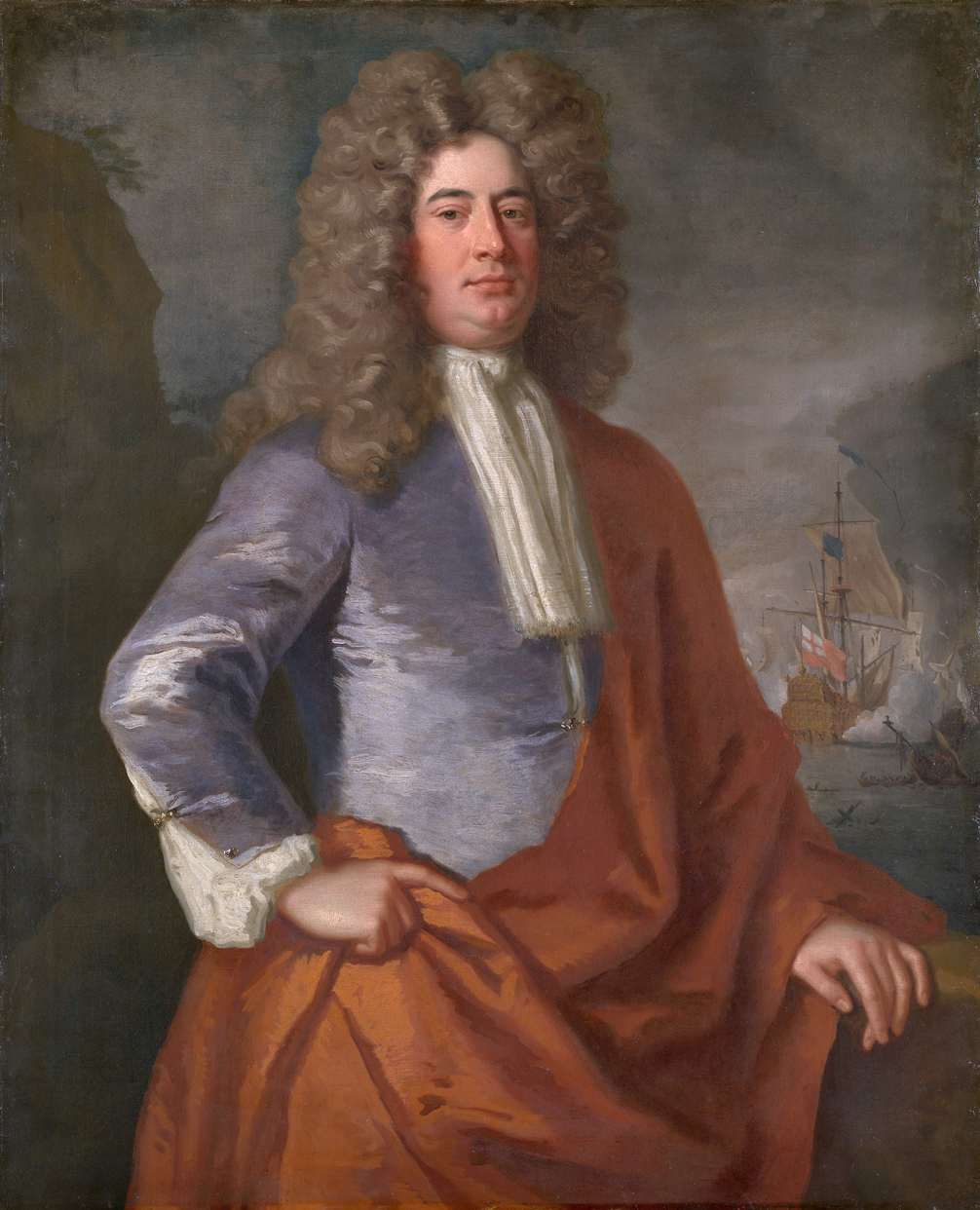
- Portrait by Jonathan Richardson, c. 1692
- Born: c.1650 Meath, Ireland
- Died: 18 August 1720 (aged 69–70); Queen's House, Greenwich
- Burial place: St Alfege Church, Greenwich
- Military career
- Allegiance: England; Great Britain
- Branch: Royal Navy
- Service years: 1678–1699; 1709–1720
- Rank: Admiral of the Fleet
- Commands: HMS Chatham; HMS Date Tree; HMS Castle; HMS Swann; HMS Tyger; HMS Charles; HMS Swallow; HMS Mary; HMS Royal Katherine; HMS Monck; HMS London; Greenwich Hospital
- Conflicts: Nine Years' War
- Other work: Ranger of Greenwich Park

Admiral of the Fleet Matthew Aylmer, 1st Baron Aylmer (c. 1650 – 18 August 1720), was a Royal Navy officer and Whig politician who sat in the English and British House of Commons between 1695 and 1720. Aylmer was one of the captains who sent a letter to Prince William of Orange, who had just landed at Torbay, assuring the Prince of the captains' support; the Prince's response ultimately led to the Royal Navy switching allegiance to the Prince and the Glorious Revolution of November 1688. Aylmer saw action at the Battle of Bantry Bay in May 1689, at the Battle of Beachy Head in July 1690 and again at the Battle of Barfleur in May 1692 during the Nine Years' War.

Aylmer became Commander-in-Chief of the Navy on 12 November 1709. However, when Aylmer met a French squadron and convoy, he was only able to capture one merchantman and the 56-gun Superbe. The new Harley Ministry used this failure as an excuse to remove him as Commander-in-Chief and did so a few months later. Following the accession of George I and the appointment of the Townshend Ministry, Aylmer was reappointed Commander-in-Chief on 5 November 1714. He was also appointed Governor of Greenwich Hospital: in this post, he founded the Royal Hospital School for the sons of seamen.

== Early career ==
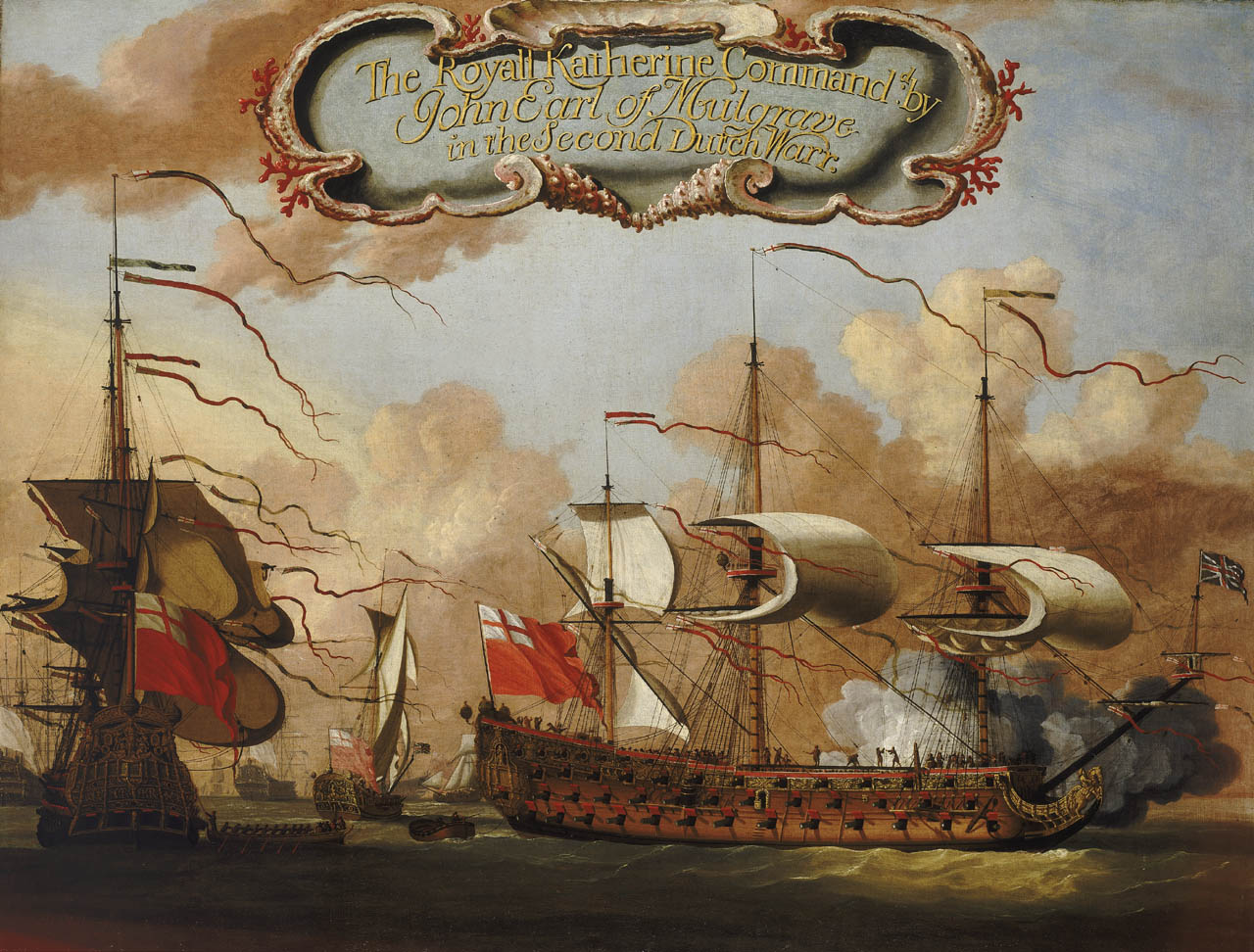
The second-rate HMS Royal Katherine, which Aylmer commanded at the Battle of Beachy Head

Aylmer was of Old English descent, the second son of Sir Christopher Aylmer of Balrath, County Meath, and Margaret Aylmer (née Plunkett), daughter of Matthew Plunkett, 5th Baron Louth and Mary Fitzwilliam. He served briefly in the Army as Ensign of foot in the Duke of Buckingham's regiment from 1672 and then joined the Royal Navy as a midshipman in the galley HMS Charles in October 1677 before being promoted to lieutenant in April 1678. Promoted to commander on 19 January 1679, he became commanding officer of the sloop HMS Chatham and then transferred to the command of the prize ship HMS Date Tree in Summer 1679. He transferred again to the command of the fire ship HMS Castle in the Mediterranean Fleet later in the year, to the command of the fifth-rate HMS Swann on the Coast of Ireland in July 1680 and to the command of the fourth-rate HMS Tyger in the Mediterranean Fleet in January 1682, before becoming commanding officer of the galley HMS Charles in September 1685. Aylmer was a young officer of the "courtier type" who benefited from the patronage of the Duke of Buckingham.

Promoted to captain on 1 October 1688, Aylmer was given command of the fourth-rate HMS Swallow in the Thames; he was one of the captains who sent a letter to Prince William of Orange, who had just landed at Torbay, assuring the Prince of the captains' support. Indeed, he was perhaps the chief of the cabal. Aylmer followed up the letter with a visit to the Prince's headquarters and arranged that Lieutenant George Byng and Captain Anthony Hastings should accompany him during the visit. The Prince's warm response to the captains ultimately led to the Royal Navy switching allegiance to the Prince and the Glorious Revolution of November 1688.

Aylmer transferred to the command of the third-rate HMS Mary in December 1688 and was present at the French victory at the Battle of Bantry Bay in May 1689 at an early stage of the Nine Years' War. His brother George Aylmer was killed during the battle.

Aylmer transferred again, this time to the command of the second-rate HMS Royal Katherine in Spring 1690 and was present at the French victory at Battle of Beachy Head in July 1690. He transferred to the command of the third-rate HMS Monck in the North Sea in Summer 1691 and then took command of the first-rate HMS London in Spring 1692. As Second Captain to Admiral Edward Russell, he saw action again at the tactically indecisive Battle of Barfleur in May 1692. As a captain, Aylmer was quite deferential to his Spanish partners during the War. Samuel Pepys believed that Aylmer should have been hanged for his habit of dipping his colours to Spanish Admirals.

== Senior command ==
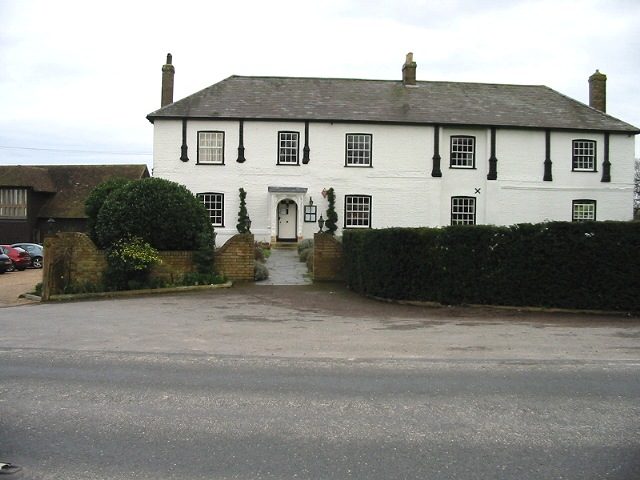
Wallet's Court Manor at Westcliffe in Kent, Aylmer's home from around 1700

Promoted to rear admiral on 8 February 1693 and to vice admiral in June 1693, Aylmer hoisted his flag in the first-rate HMS Royal Sovereign and served under Admiral Edward Russell as second-in-command of the Mediterranean Fleet. He also became Whig Member of Parliament for Portsmouth at a by-election in 1695 but had to stand down when the House of Commons declared the by-election void in January 1696. Nevertheless, he was elected Whig Member of Parliament for Dover in December 1697. The Treaty of Ryswick was signed in September 1697, bringing the Nine Years' War to an end and, after a delay in fitting out his squadron, Aylmer went out into the Mediterranean, with his flag in the second-rate HMS Boyne, to ensure the treaty was being observed in September 1698; he then retired from active service in October 1699. In around 1700 he acquired Wallett's Court Manor at Westcliffe in Kent as a property in which he would live in retirement. He also had a property at No. 12 Great Piazza in Covent Garden.

Following the death of Prince George (Queen Anne's consort), which brought Russell back to the Admiralty, Aylmer was promoted to Admiral of the Fleet and Commander-in-Chief of the Navy on 12 November 1709. He lost his Dover seat at the 1710 British general election which produced a landslide victory for the Tory party in the wake of the prosecution of Henry Sacheverell which Aylmer had supported. In July 1710, when Aylmer met a French squadron and convoy, he was only able to capture one merchantman and the 56-gun Superbe: the new Harley Ministry used this failure as an excuse to remove him as Commander-in-Chief and did so in January 1711.

Following the accession of George I in August 1714, which led to the appointment of the Townshend Ministry in September 1714, Russell was back at the Admiralty again and Aylmer was reappointed Commander-in-Chief on 5 November 1714. Alymer was also appointed Governor of Greenwich Hospital on the same date: in this post he started to fund education for the sons of seamen from entry charges to the Painted Hall, pensioners' fines and proceeds from the sale of stores. The same day he was also appointed Ranger of Greenwich Park.

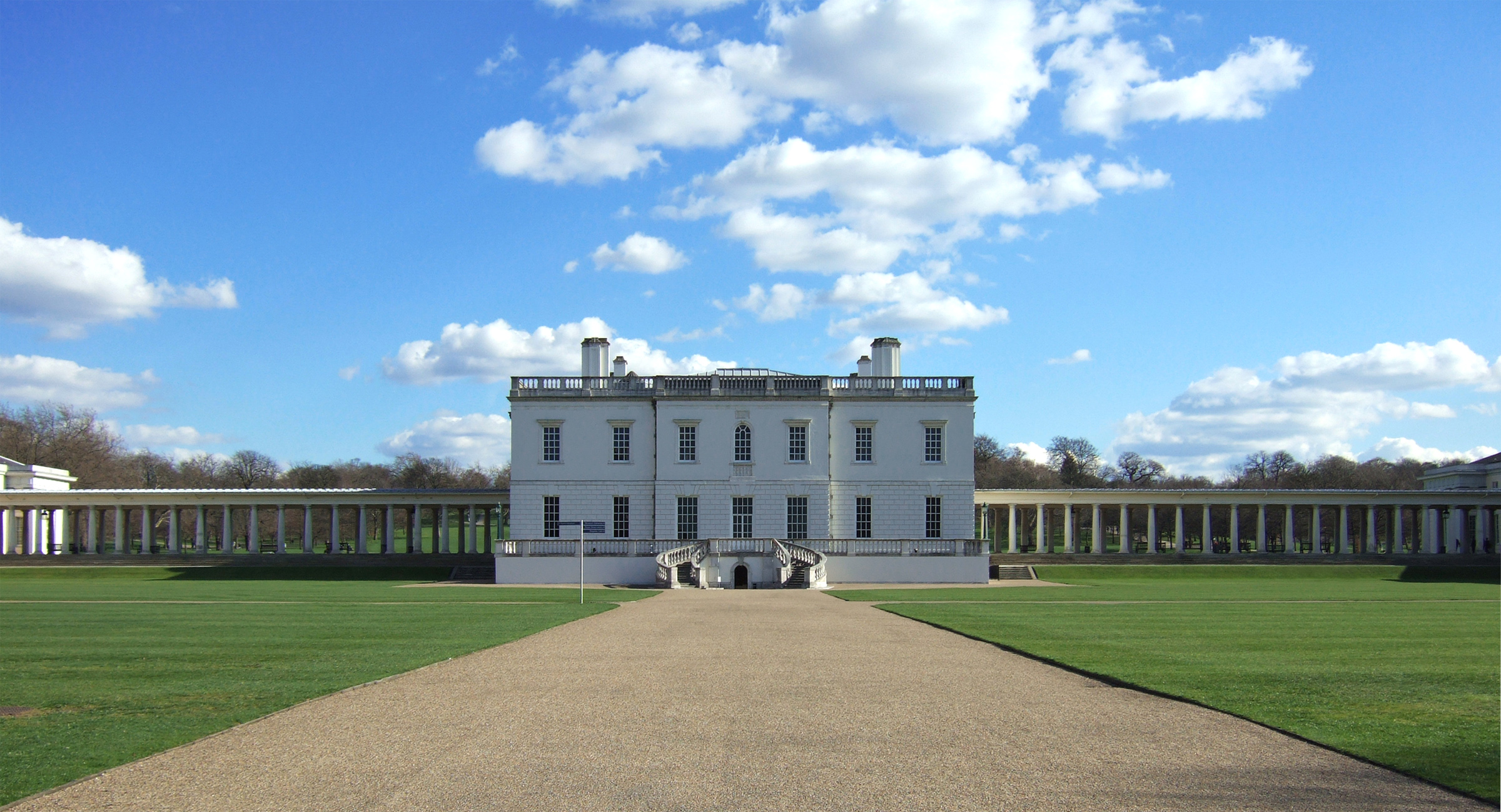
The Queen's House at Greenwich, where Aylmer died, viewed from the main gate

Alymer recovered his seat in Parliament at Dover at the 1715 British general election which saw the Whigs win an overwhelming majority in the House of Commons. He went on to join the Board of Admiralty led by the Earl of Berkeley, as Senior Naval Lord, in April 1717. He resigned his appointments as a member of the Admiralty Board and as Commander-in-Chief in March 1718 and was rewarded by being appointed Rear-Admiral of Great Britain and also being created Lord Aylmer of Balrath in the Peerage of Ireland on 1 May 1718.

Aylmer died at Queen's House in Greenwich on 18 August 1720 and was buried at St Alfege's Church in Greenwich.

== Family ==
In circa 1680 Aylmer married Sarah, daughter of Edward Ellis; they had a son and two daughters.

== Sources ==
- Corbet, Julian Stafford (1987). England in the Mediterranean: A Study of the Rise and Influence of British Power Within the Straits 1603–1713: A Study of the Rise and Influence of the British Power Within the Straits, 1603–1713. Greenwood Press. ISBN 978-0313254178.
- Harris, Simon (2001). Sir Cloudesley Shovell: Stuart Admiral. The History Press. ISBN 978-1862270992.
- Marshall, P. J. (2004). Proceedings of the British Academy – Biographical Memoirs of Fellows. Oxford University Press. ISBN 0-19-726320-8.
- Powley, Edward Barzillai (2010). The English Navy in the Revolution of 1688. Cambridge University Press. ISBN 978-1108013390.
- Rodger, N. A. M. (1979). The Admiralty. Offices of State. Lavenham: T. Dalton Ltd. ISBN 0900963948.

Parliament of England
| Preceded by Nicholas Hedger; Edward Russell | Member of Parliament for Portsmouth; 1695–1696; With: Nicholas Hedger | Succeeded by Nicholas Hedger; John Gibson |
| Preceded by Sir Basil Dixwell, Bt; James Chadwick | Member of Parliament for Dover; 1697–1707; With: Sir Basil Dixwell, Bt to 1701; Sir Charles Hedges 1701; Philip Papillon from 1701 | Succeeded by Parliament of Great Britain |
Parliament of Great Britain
| Preceded by Parliament of England | Member of Parliament for Dover; 1707–1710; With: Philip Papillon | Succeeded by Philip Papillon; Sir William Hardres, Bt |
| Preceded by Philip Papillon; Sir William Hardres, Bt | Member of Parliament for Dover; 1715–1720; With: Philip Papillon | Succeeded by George Berkeley; Henry Furnese |
Military offices
| Preceded by Sir George Byng | Senior Naval Lord; 1717–1718 | Succeeded by Sir George Byng |
| Preceded by Sir William Gifford | Governor, Greenwich Hospital; 1714–1720 | Succeeded by Sir John Jennings |
Honorary titles
| Vacant Title last held by Sir John Leake | Rear-Admiral of Great Britain; 1719–1720 | Succeeded by Sir George Byng, Bt |
Peerage of Ireland
| New creation | Baron Aylmer; 1718–1720 | Succeeded by Henry Aylmer |
