= Acrise Place =

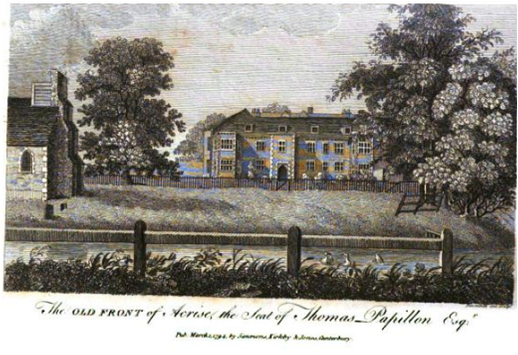
- Acrise Place, 1793

- Location within Kent

General information
- Type: Country house
- Location: Acrise, Folkestone and Hythe, Kent
- Coordinates: 51.13701°N 1.133729°E

Acrise Place is a mainly 18th-century house located about 6 miles (9.6 km) north of Folkestone in the village of Acrise, Kent, England. It is a Grade II* listed building.

It is a brick-built house dating from the 16th century, with modifications in 1671 and 1691, and which was restored in the 1950s and 1987. There are two parallel ranges, a 16th-century north-facing range and a 17th-century south-facing range.

It was originally built by the Hamon family in the 16th century, but acquired in 1666 by Jane and Thomas Papillon for about £6,000. Jane managed this property and their town house. Her letter from 1667 and 1668 are extant. The house and estate were passed down in that family for several generations. Two of the Papillon owners were Philip and David Papillon, father and son, who were both MPs for nearby Dover.

In 1850 the Papillons sold Acrise to William Mackinnon MP after whose death it was sold in 1908 to the Walney family, who occupied it until 1936. After standing empty for a time the house was used by the Army during the war and repurchased by the Papillons in 1946.

On 29 July 1944, Flight Sgt Anthony Drew of 56 Squadron RAF, while pursuing a V1 Flying Bomb in a Hawker Tempest, became disoriented in cloud and crashed into the ground, narrowly missing the house. Drew's remains and some wreckage of his Hawker Tempest were recovered the next day. Drew had previously shot down 3 V-1s.

The Folkestone Building Company purchased the property in 1986 and undertook a major programme of restoration of the main house. They also converted the 18th century stable blocks and ancillary buildings to exclusive residential units. The main house is now divided into two separate properties, Acrise Place and Acrise Court.

The 18th-century stable block is a separately listed Grade II listed building.
