= Henry Furnese (MP, died 1756) =

British Member of Parliament

Henry Furnese (after 1688 – 30 August 1756), of Gunnersbury House, Middlesex, was a British merchant and politician who sat in the House of Commons between 1720 and 1756.

Furnese was the only son of George Furnese, an East India Company factor. He was apprenticed to Moses Berenger, a London merchant, and became a member of the Lisbon factory. Some time after September 1709, he succeeded to the estates of his father who died insane.

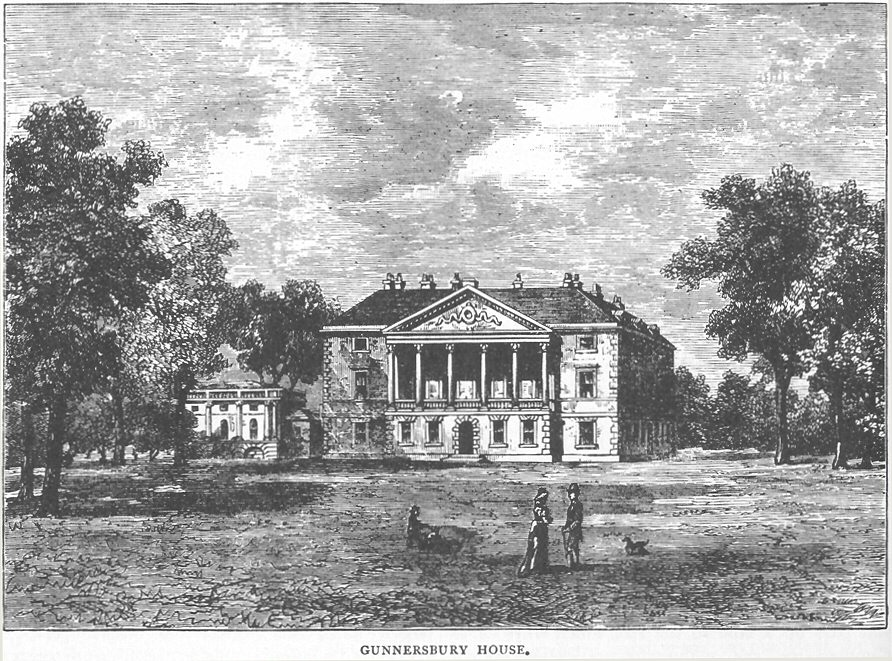
Gunnersbury House c.1750

Furnese was returned unopposed as Member of Parliament for Dover with government support in a by-election on 20 December. In 1722, he bought Lathom Hall, near Wigan and declared himself a candidate for Wigan at the 1722 general election, but gave up before the poll. Instead he was returned unopposed again for Dover. In 1723 and 1729 he obtained contracts for remitting money to the garrisons in Gibraltar and Minorca. At the 1727 general election there was a contest at Dover and he was re-elected as MP. However at the 1734 general election he was defeated in the poll. He was returned unopposed at a by-election on 18 May 1738 as MP for Morpeth which his friend Lord Morpeth had vacated on succeeding to a peerage. In 1739 he bought Gunnersbury Park in Hounslow, London from Lord Hobart. He became an associate of William Pulteney, and voted with the Opposition against the Spanish convention in 1739 and for the place bill in 1740. In 1741 he was returned on the Furnese interest for New Romney, which he represented for the rest of his life.

When Walpole fell in 1742, Furnese was elected a member of the secret committee and was one of Pulteney's followers who went over to the Administration and obtained offices. Furnese was appointed Secretary to the Treasury in July 1742. His appointment was referenced in many satires attacking Pulteney and he resigned from the secret committee and post in December 1742. He remained in opposition, voting against the Government in all recorded divisions and was returned again for New Romney at the 1747 and 1754 general elections. He was appointed as Lord of the Treasury from 1755 until his death.

Furnese died unmarried on 30 August 1756. Gunnersbury house and estate were purchased from his sister Elizabeth Pearce in 1760 for Princess Amelia, the daughter of King George II.

Parliament of Great Britain
| Preceded by Matthew Aylmer; Philip Papillon | Member of Parliament for Dover; 1720–1734; With: George Berkeley | Succeeded by David Papillon; Thomas Revell |
| Preceded by Viscount Morpeth; Sir Henry Liddell | Member of Parliament for Morpeth; 1738–1741; With: Sir Henry Liddell | Succeeded by Sir Henry Liddell; Robert Ord |
| Preceded by Sir Robert Austen, Bt; Stephen Bisse | Member of Parliament for New Romney; 1741–1756; With: Sir Francis Dashwood | Succeeded by Sir Francis Dashwood; Rose Fuller |
