= Sir Christopher Aylmer, 1st Baronet =

Irish landowner (c.1620-1671)

Sir Christopher Aylmer, 1st Baronet (c.1620-1671) was an Irish landowner.

Aylmer was the son of Gerald Aylmer of Balrath. The family was part of the Old English community of The Pale which largely remained Roman Catholic. Following the Cromwellian conquest of Ireland his family had been deprived of their estates, but they recovered them following the Restoration and in 1662 Aylmer was made a baronet.

He married Margaret Plunkett, daughter of Matthew Plunkett, 5th Baron Louth and Mary Fitzwilliam. He was the father of the naval officers Matthew Aylmer, who became a distinguished Admiral, and George Aylmer who reached the rank of Captain before being killed at the Battle of Bantry Bay in 1689. Through Matthew, Sir Christopher was the ancestor of the Aylmer Barons. His eldest son Sir Gerald Aylmer, 2nd Baronet succeeded him in his baronetcy.

== Bibliography ==
- Stewart, William. Admirals of the World: A Biographical Dictionary, 1500 to the Present. McFarland, 2009.

Baronetage of Ireland
New creation	Baronet (of Balrath); 1662–1671	Succeeded by Gerald Aylmer
