= St Martin's Church, Acrise =

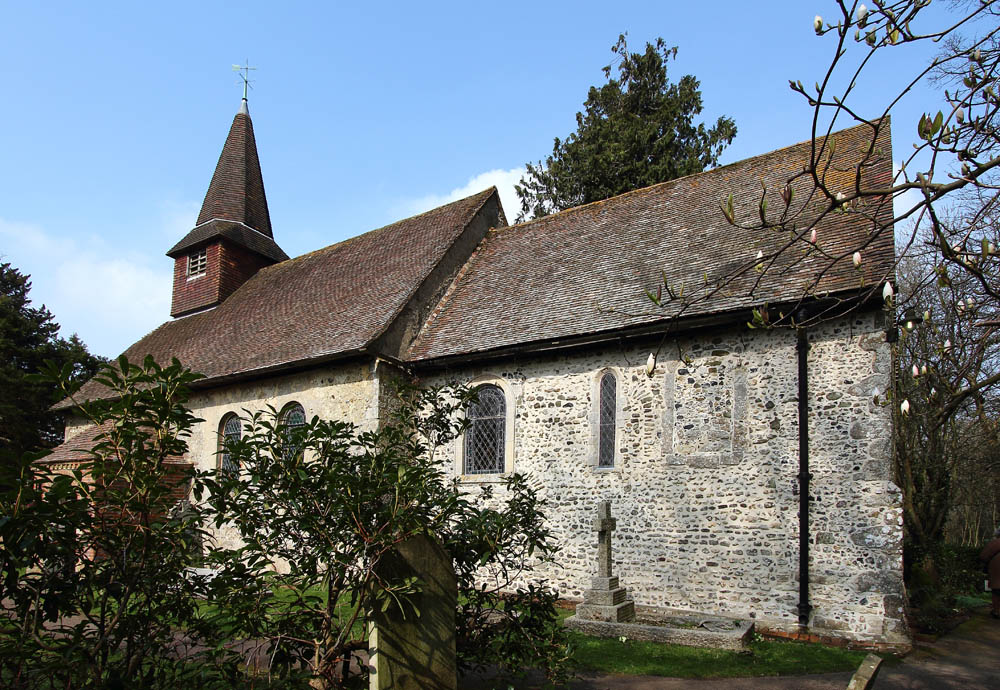
- South view of the church

- Location in Kent
- 51.1373°N 1.1346°E
- OS grid reference: TR 19385 42235
- Location: Acrise, Kent
- Country: England
- Denomination: Anglican

History
- Status: Parish church

Architecture
- Functional status: Active
- Heritage designation: Grade I
- Designated: 29 December 1966
- Architectural type: Church

Specifications
- Materials: Coursed flint

Administration
- Province: Canterbury
- Diocese: Canterbury
- Archdeaconry: Ashford
- Deanery: Elham
- Parish: Acrise

St Martin's Church is an Anglican church in the village and parish of Acrise in Kent, England. The church dates back to the Norman era, and was designated a Grade I listed building in 1966.

== History and architecture ==
The lower chancel and the nave are both from Norman times, built out of coursed boulder flint and ironstone with Caen dressings. In the chancel, outlines of a south window and a priest's doorway are visible, and a blocked north window is present in the nave. The west doorway dates from the 13th century. The chancel was lengthened circa 1300, and contains a mutilated two-light east window. The large round-headed windows elsewhere in the church are from the 18th century, as is the chequered brick porch. The west bellcote and tired spirelet were remade after 1922. The west buttresses are full-height, and date back to the 19th century. The chancel arch contains impost shafts which die in halfway down, as well as a sharply pointed arch which is made out reused stones carved with 12th-century embattling. The chancel and nave roofs have crown posts. The west gallery is deep, with turned balusters and carved and gilded royal arms of William and Mary. The manorial pew on the south side of the church contains a table dated to 1758, as well as small 18th-century schoolchildren's chairs. The chancel was restored in the 19th century, which is most visible at the east end.

== Glass and monuments ==
St Martin's displays two noteworthy stained glass windows; the first is a grisaille with coloured borders, built in 1855 by Powell. The second is that of the Good Shepherd and Light of the World, built in 1897 by Heaton, Butler and Bayne and installed in the east chancel. Monuments in the church include that of Mary Heyman (died 1601, in 28-inch brass with a damaged head; Ann Papillon (died 1693) and her daughter Ann (died 1694), presented in a cartouche placed above the family pew, and signed by Joseph Helby; and William Turner (died 1729), presented in a long tablet.

== Bibliography ==
- Newman, John (2013). Kent: North East and East. Buildings of England. Harmondsworth: Yale University Press. ISBN 978-0-300-18506-5.
