= English ship Portland (1653) =

Ship of the line of the Royal Navy

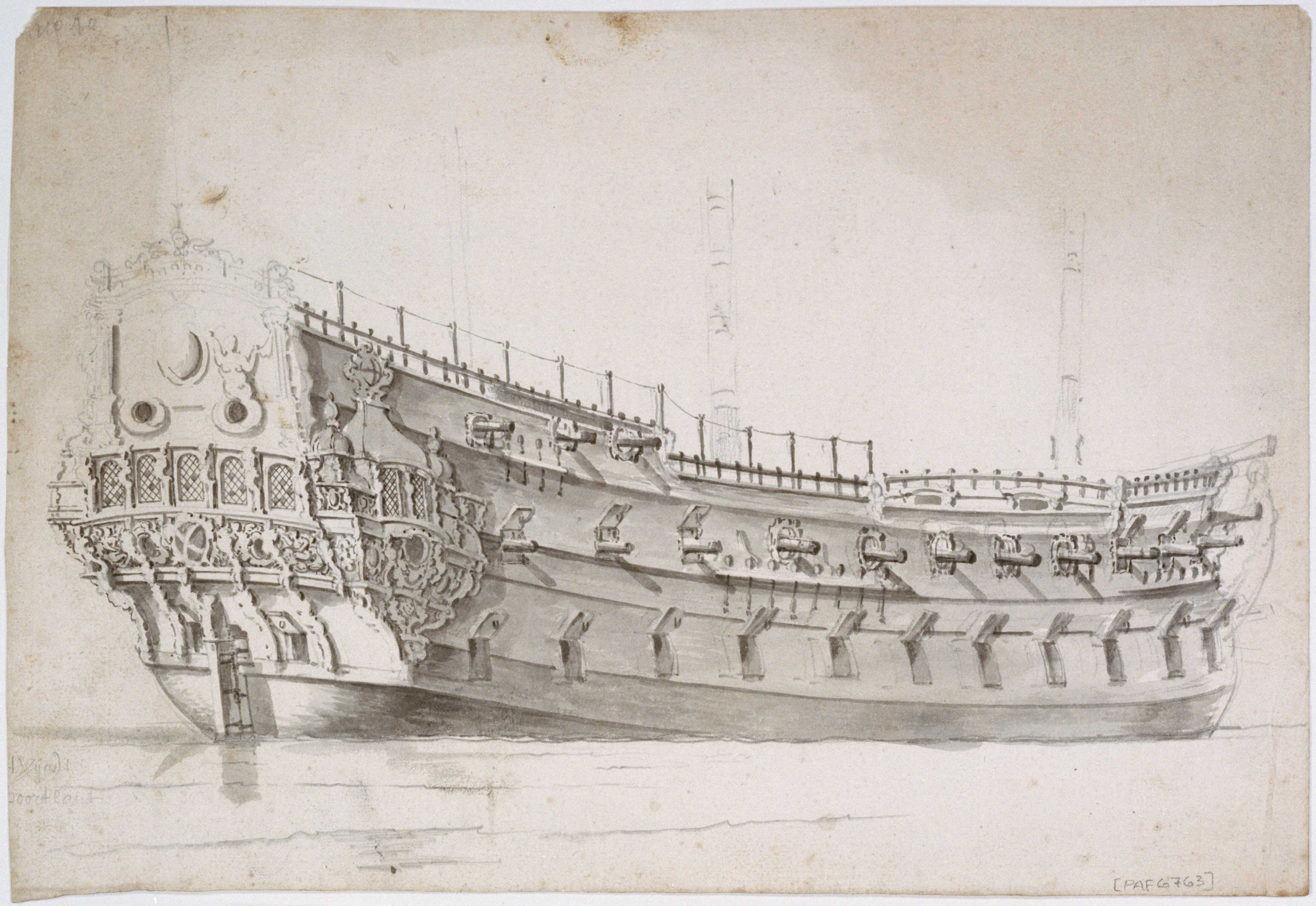
- The Portland, drawn circa 1661 by Willem van de Velde the Elder

History

England
- Name: Portland
- Builder: James Taylor, Wapping
- Launched: 1653
- Fate: Burnt, 1692

General characteristics
- Class & type: Fourth-rate frigate
- Length: 105 ft (32.0 m) (keel)
- Beam: 32 ft 11 in (10.0 m)
- Depth of hold: 12 ft 10 in (3.9 m)
- Sail plan: Full-rigged ship
- Armament: 40 guns (1660); 48 guns (1677)

Portland was a 40-gun fourth-rate frigate of the English Royal Navy, originally built for the navy of the Commonwealth of England at Wapping, and launched in 1653. By 1677 her armament had been increased to 48 guns. She took part in the Battle of Bantry Bay in 1689, when her Irish-born captain George Aylmer was killed in action.

Portland was burnt in 1692 to prevent her from being captured.
