= Edward Ward (judge) =

English lawyer and judge

Sir Edward Ward (1638–1714) was an English lawyer and judge. He became chief baron of the exchequer, and is best known as the judge in the state trial for piracy of Captain Kidd.

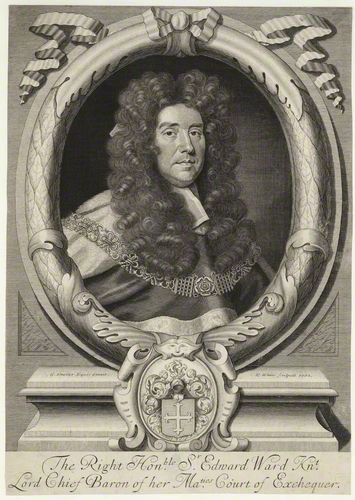
Sir Edward Ward, 1702 engraving by Robert White.

== Life ==
Born in June 1638, he was the second son of William Ward of Preston, Rutland. He was educated under Francis Meres at Wing, Rutland. He was a student at Clifford's Inn, and was then admitted in June 1664 at the Inner Temple; he was called to the bar in 1670, and obtained a practice in the exchequer court.

Connected with the Whig faction, Ward appeared as one of the counsel for William Russell, Lord Russell, in July 1683. On 6 November 1684 he was leading counsel for his father-in-law, Thomas Papillon, in the action for false imprisonment brought against him by Sir William Pritchard. Ward's argument was interrupted by Chief-justice George Jeffreys, who declared that he had made a long speech but did not understand what he was about. Ward persisted, Jeffreys repeated his observations, there was hissing in the court, and Ward called his witnesses. The verdict went against his client, but in 1688 Ward was able to settle scores with Pritchard. On 25 November 1684 Ward appeared in the exchequer court for Charles Gerard, 1st Earl of Macclesfield, in the action of scandalum magnatum against John Starkey, a juryman of Cheshire, by which county he had recently been presented as a disaffected person.

In 1687 Ward became bencher of his inn, of which he was also Lent reader in 1690 and treasurer in 1693. On 12 April 1689 he was appointed by William III a justice of the common pleas, but was excused, at his own wish, four days later. In July of that year he acted as one of the counsel for Dr. John Elliott, Captain Vaughan, and Mr. Mould, who were impeached by the Commons for circulating King James's declaration.

He was appointed Attorney-general on 30 March 1693, and was knighted at Kensington on 30 October. He was sworn serjeant-at-law on 3 June, and on 8 June 1695 was named lord chief baron of the exchequer. In the following March he was one of the judges who tried Robert Charnock and his associates for treason. He was one of the judges who in January 1700 declined to give an opinion in the so-called "bankers' case upon the writ of error". In May of the same year he acted as one of the commissioners of the great seal. The most important case over which Ward presided was the trial of Captain William Kidd and his associates for piracy and murder in May 1701.

He died at his house in Essex Street, The Strand on 14 July 1714. He was buried at Stoke Doyle, Northamptonshire, where he had purchased the lordship of the manor in 1694. A portrait was engraved by R. White in 1702 from a painting by Godfrey Kneller. A monument was erected to his memory at Stoke Doyle by John Michael Rysbrack c. 1722.

== Family ==
Ward married, on 30 March 1676, Elizabeth, third daughter of the letter writer Jane and Thomas Papillon. They had nine surviving children, four sons and five daughters. Two of the sons were eminent lawyers. The eldest, Edward, rebuilt Stoke Doyle church and erected in it a monument to his father. Jane, the eldest daughter, married Thomas Hunt of Boreatton, in the parish of Baschurch, Shropshire, and was ancestress of the Ward-Hunt family. Another son, Thomas, was the consul-general to Russia and agent of the Russia Company. He died suddenly in Moscow in February 1731.

Legal offices
| Preceded by Sir William Montagu | Lord Chief Baron of the Exchequer; 1695–1714 | Succeeded by Sir Samuel Dodd |
