= Hardres baronets =

Extinct baronetcy in the Baronetage of England

- Escutcheon of the Hardres baronets of Hardres Court
- Creation date: 1642
- Status: extinct
- Extinction date: 1764

The Hardres Baronetcy, of Hardres Court in the County of Kent, was a title in the Baronetage of England. It was created on 3 June 1642 for Sir Richard Hardres. The fourth Baronet, Sir William Hardres, was Member of Parliament for Kent and Canterbury. The title became extinct on the death of the fifth Baronet, William Hardres II, in 1764.

== Hardres baronets, of Hardres Court (1642) ==
- Sir Richard Hardres, 1st Baronet (1606–1669)
- Sir Peter Hardres, 2nd Baronet (1635–1673)
- Sir Thomas Hardres, 3rd Baronet (1660–1688)
- Sir William Hardres, 4th Baronet (1686–1736)
- Sir William Hardres, 5th Baronet (1718–1764)
