= Henry Aylmer, 2nd Baron Aylmer =

British politician

The Right Honourable Baron Aylmer

Member of Parliament for Rye
- In office 1722–1727
- Preceded by: Phillips Gybbon; Sir John Norris
- Succeeded by: Phillips Gybbon; John Norris

Personal details
- Born: c.1694
- Died: 26 June 1754
- Party: Whig
- Spouse: Elizabeth Priestman
- Relations: Sir John Norris (brother-in-law)
- Children: 4, including Henry

Henry Aylmer, 2nd Baron Aylmer (c. 1694 – 26 June 1754) was a British Whig politician.

== Early life ==
Henry Aylmer was born in around 1694, the son of Admiral of the Fleet Matthew Aylmer, 1st Baron Aylmer.

== Political career ==
Aylmer succeeded his father in the barony on 16 August 1720. He was instead returned to Parliament for Rye in 1722, a seat he held until 1727. He was also an Equerry to King George I from 1714 to 1727 and served as Comptroller of the Mint between 1727 and 1754.

== Personal life ==
Aylmer married Elizabeth, daughter of William Priestman, in June 1716. Elizabeth died in January 1750. Aylmer survived her by four years and died on 26 June 1754. He was succeeded in the barony by his eldest surviving son, the couple having had four sons:

- Captain Matthew Aylmer (1717–1748), British Army officer in the Foot Guards
- Captain Henry Aylmer, 3rd Baron Aylmer (21 May 1718 – 7 October 1766), Royal Navy officer
- Philip Aylmer (b. 1721, d. young), unmarried
- Reverend John Aylmer (25 May 1723 – 16 February 1793), prebendary of Bristol and rector of St Alban, Wood Street

Parliament of Great Britain
Preceded by Phillips Gybbon; Sir John Norris	Member of Parliament for Rye; 1722–1727; With: Phillips Gybbon	Succeeded by Phillips Gybbon; John Norris
Peerage of Ireland
Preceded by Matthew Aylmer	Baron Aylmer; 1720–1754	Succeeded by Henry Aylmer
