= Baron Aylmer =

Title in the peerage of Ireland

Arms of Aylmer: Argent, a cross sable between four Cornish choughs proper

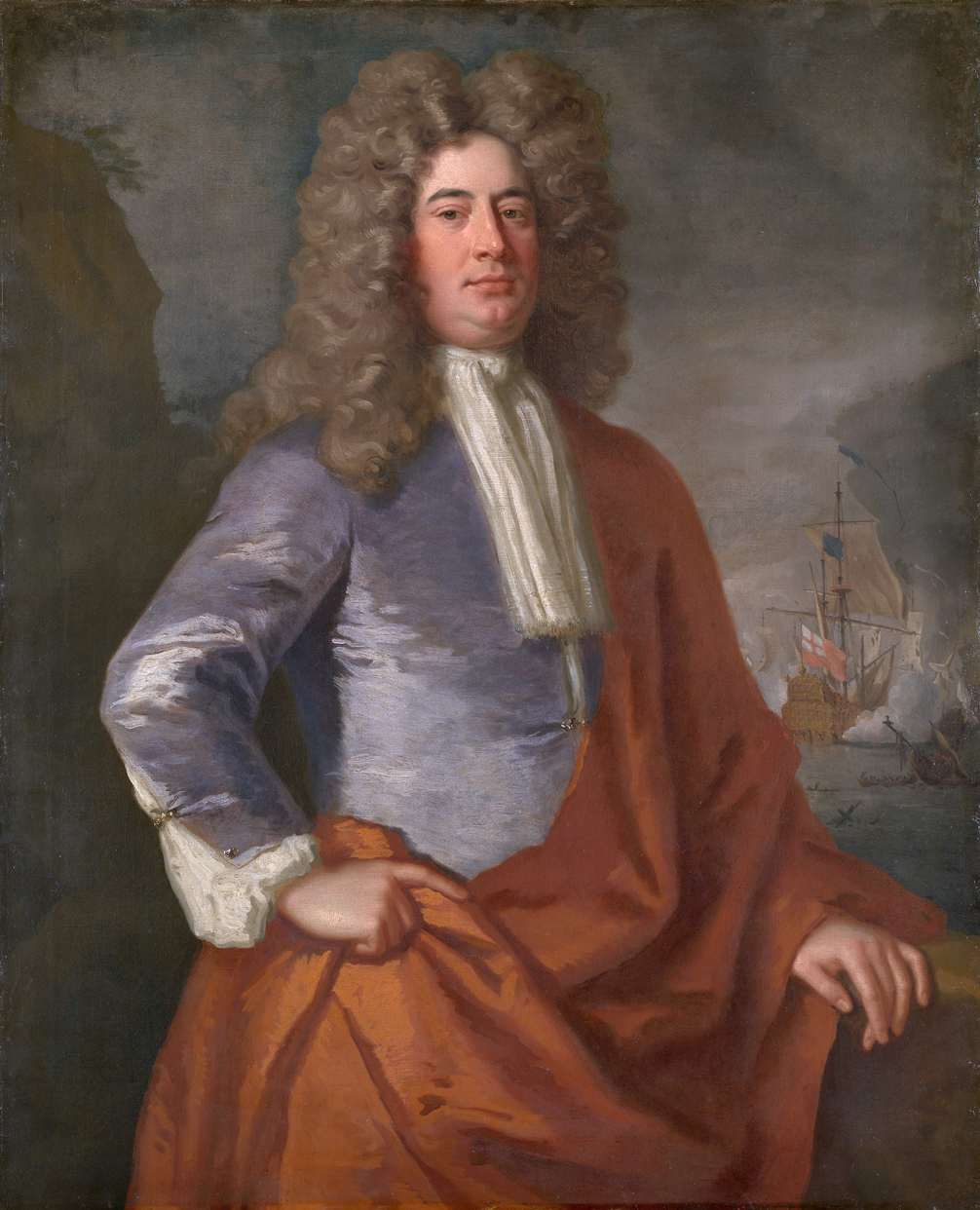
Matthew Aylmer, 1st Baron Aylmer

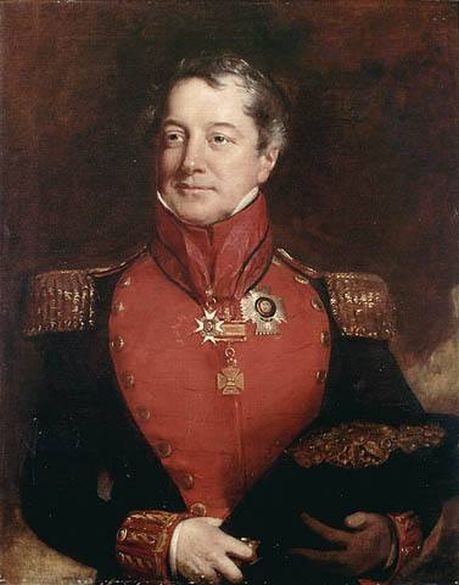
Matthew Whitworth-Aylmer, 5th Baron Aylmer

Lord Aylmer, Baron of Balrath, in the County of Meath, is a title in the Peerage of Ireland. It was created in 1718 for the naval commander Matthew Aylmer, the second son of Sir Christopher Aylmer, 1st Baronet, of Balrath (see below). Lord Aylmer's son, the second Baron, represented Rye in the House of Commons. The latter's grandson, the fourth Baron, succeeded his kinsman as seventh Baronet, of Balrath, in 1776. The titles remain united. He was succeeded in both titles by his son, the fifth Baron. He was a general in the Army and served as Governor General of Canada from 1830 to 1835. Lord Aylmer assumed by Royal licence the additional surname of Whitworth in 1825 on the death of his uncle Charles Whitworth, 1st Earl Whitworth. On his death, the titles passed to his younger brother, the sixth Baron. He was an admiral in the Royal Navy.

He was succeeded by his second cousin, Udolphus Aylmer, the seventh Baron, born on 10 June 1814 and living in Canada. He was the son of John Athalmer Aylmer, eldest son of Admiral John Aylmer, son of Reverend the Hon. John Aylmer, fourth son of the second Baron. His claim to the titles was not allowed until 1860, however. His son Matthew Aylmer, the eighth Baron, was a major-general in the Canadian Army. His third son, the eleventh Baron, was succeeded by his third cousin, the twelfth Baron. He was the great-grandson of Major-General Harry Aylmer, second son of the aforementioned Admiral John Aylmer. On his death in 1982, the title passed to his second cousin, the thirteenth Baron. He was the grandson of Frederick Arthur Aylmer, second son of Major-General Harry Aylmer. As of 2014 the titles are held by his son, the fourteenth Baron.

The Aylmer Baronetcy, of Balrath in the County of Meath, was created on 6 November 1662 in the Baronetage of Ireland for Christopher Aylmer, the father of the first baron, who was his second son. On the death of the first Baronet's great-grandson, the sixth Baronet, the title was inherited by the latter's kinsman, the fourth Baron Aylmer, and became subsumed into that peerage.

The family seat was Donadea Castle, near Donadea, County Kildare.

== Aylmer baronets, of Balrath (1662) ==
- Sir Christopher Aylmer, 1st Baronet (c. 1620–1671)
- Sir Gerald Aylmer, 2nd Baronet (c. 1640–1702)
- Sir John Aylmer, 3rd Baronet (died 1714)
- Sir Andrew Aylmer, 4th Baronet (died 1740)
- Sir Gerald Aylmer, 5th Baronet (died 1745)
- Sir Matthew Aylmer, 6th Baronet (1724–1776)
- Sir Henry Aylmer, 7th Baronet (died 1785) (had succeeded as Baron Aylmer in 1766)

== Barons Aylmer (1718) ==
- Matthew Aylmer, 1st Baron Aylmer (c. 1650–1720)
- Henry Aylmer, 2nd Baron Aylmer (died 1754)
- Henry Aylmer, 3rd Baron Aylmer (1718–1766)
- Henry Aylmer, 4th Baron Aylmer (died 1785)
- Matthew Whitworth-Aylmer, 5th Baron Aylmer (1775–1850)
- Frederick Whitworth Aylmer, 6th Baron Aylmer (1777–1858)
- Udolphus Aylmer, 7th Baron Aylmer (1814–1901)
- Matthew Aylmer, 8th Baron Aylmer (1842–1923)
- John Frederick Whitworth Aylmer, 9th Baron Aylmer (1880–1970)
- Kenneth Athalmer Aylmer, 10th Baron Aylmer (1883–1974)
- Basil Udolphus Aylmer, 11th Baron Aylmer (1886–1977)
- Hugh Yates Aylmer, 12th Baron Aylmer (1907–1982)
- Michael Anthony Aylmer, 13th Baron Aylmer (1923–2006)
- (Anthony) Julian Aylmer, 14th Baron Aylmer (born 1951)

The heir apparent is the present holder's son Hon. Michael Henry Aylmer (born 1991).

== See also ==
- Aylmer baronets
