= Henry Aylmer, 3rd Baron Aylmer =

Royal Navy officer and hereditary peer

Captain The Right Honourable The Lord Aymler
- Aylmer coat of arms
- Born: Baptised 21 May 1718
- Died: 7 October 1766
- Military career
- Allegiance: Kingdom of Great Britain
- Branch: Royal Navy
- Service years: c. 1733–1744
- Rank: Captain
- Commands: HMS Port Mahon
- Conflicts: War of the Austrian Succession; Siege of St. Augustine
- Other work: Comptroller of the Mint

Captain Henry Aylmer, 3rd Baron Aylmer (c.21 May 1718 – 7 October 1766) was a Royal Navy officer and hereditary peer of the eighteenth century. He served during the War of the Austrian Succession and fought at the Siege of St. Augustine on board HMS Hector. Promoted to post-captain in 1741, he commanded HMS Port Mahon for three years before retiring from the navy. He inherited the title of Baron Aylmer in 1754 and later briefly served as Comptroller of the Mint.

== Life ==
Henry Aylmer was born in the first half of 1718 and baptised on 21 May 1718, the second son of Henry Aylmer, 2nd Baron Aylmer and his wife Elizabeth née Priestman. He joined the Royal Navy early on in his life, serving in 1733 in a ship off the coast of Africa. He was promoted to lieutenant on 14 June 1735 and sent to serve on the 60-gun fourth-rate HMS Warwick as her third lieutenant, serving in Admiral Sir John Norris's fleet in the Tagus. He stayed there until 16 October of the same year when he left the ship. After around two years on half pay, he was next appointed to serve as the single lieutenant on board the 8-gun sloop HMS Bonetta, a ship that was at the time paying off, on 18 November 1737. He transferred from Bonetta to the newly recommissioned 40-gun fourth-rate HMS Hector as that ship's third lieutenant on 28 February 1738. The War of the Austrian Succession having begun in 1740, Aylmer continued to serve in Hector, and he was present in her during the unsuccessful Siege of St. Augustine between April and 5 July of the same year.

Having at some point previously been promoted to commander, Aylmer was promoted to post-captain on 18 September 1741. He was given command of the 20-gun frigate HMS Port Mahon and was employed as a cruising frigate in the Bay of Biscay through the winter. Port Mahon moved to begin serving in the Western Approaches in February 1742; on 30 April Aylmer captured the Spanish 14-gun sloop Peregrina, and in May he captured a Spanish 18-gun privateer while in consort with the 44-gun frigate HMS Launceston, which prize they then sent in to Portsmouth. He continued in Port Mahon, and on 9 June 1743, he captured the Spanish 16-gun privateer Santa Theresa de Jesus after a chase of five hours, in which ten of the privateer's crew were killed. In February 1744 he encountered the East Indiaman Duke of Lorrain being attacked by a Spanish 40-gun privateer and set out to defend the merchant ship; upon Port Mahon's arrival the privateer disengaged from Duke of Lorrain, threw all of her guns overboard to increase her speed and fled from the action.

Continuing to serve around the English Channel, on 10 May Port Mahon captured the French 18-gun treasure ship Le Lion d'Or as the latter attempted to sail from Mississippi to La Rochelle, putting up little resistance before she surrendered to Aylmer. He continued in command of the frigate only until 4 June of the same year, at which point he resigned his command of her. Port Mahon was Aylmer's last active service in the Royal Navy. He inherited the title of Baron Aylmer from his father upon the latter's death on 26 June 1754, because his elder brother Matthew had already died in 1748. In 1757 Aylmer was given a pension of £500 per annum by the prime minister, Lord Newcastle, in return for him vacating his position as Comptroller of the Mint in favour of John Buller. Aylmer died on 7 October 1766. (Note: Death also recorded as 18 November 1766.)

== Family ==
Aylmer married Anne Pierce (died 1756), the daughter of William Pierce of Virginia. Together they had a son and a daughter:

- Henry Aylmer, 4th Baron Aylmer (died 1785)
- Anne Aylmer

== Notes and citations ==
=== Citations ===
Peerage of Ireland
Preceded by Henry Aylmer	Baron Aylmer; 1754–1766	Succeeded by Henry Aylmer
