= David Papillon (architect) =

French architect and military engineer (1581–1659)

David Papillon (1581–1659) was a French Huguenot architect and military engineer in England.

== Life ==
He was born in France on 14 April 1581 into a Huguenot family, the younger son of Thomas Papillon, captain of the guard and valet-de-chambre to Henri IV of France, and his wife Jeanne Vieue de la Pierre. In 1588 his mother sailed with him and his two sisters for England. Their ship was wrecked off Hythe; the mother died, but the children were saved. He was brought up in England.

Papillon was involved in London property development. As an architect, he is known for Papillon Hall, an octagonal house from 1622 that he built at Lubenham, Leicestershire. It was demolished in 1950.

A Parliamentarian of the English Civil War, Papillon was treasurer of Leicestershire from 1642 to 1646. He fortified Leicester and Gloucester for the parliament, and advised on the defence of Northampton.

After his death in March 1659, a memorial to Papillon was placed in St Katherine Coleman, London, a church that has also since been demolished.

== Works ==
Papillon published in 1645 A Practicall Abstract of the Arts of Fortification and Assailing. He was author of a moral and religious essay entitled The Vanity of the Lives and Passions of Men, London, 1651; and left in manuscript an essay on forms of government, Several Political and Military Observations, and a French version of the Comfort to the Afflicted and two other works of the Puritan Robert Bolton.

== Family ==
Papillon married twice:

1. In 1611 he married Marie (died 1614), daughter of Jean Castel, pastor of the French church in London, where Papillon was deacon.
2. In 1615 he married Anne Marie, granddaughter of Giuliano Calandrini, a Protestant convert from Lucca. Thomas Papillon was their son.
