= ELMER guidelines =

ELMER (Easier and more Efficient Reporting) is a comprehensive set of principles and specifications for the design of Internet-based forms.

The Norwegian Ministry of Trade and Industry has decided that the most recent version, ELMER2, shall be the common guidelines for user interfaces in Norwegian public forms for enterprises on the Internet. All public forms in Norway shall be based on the ELMER guidelines within the end of 2008 .

The Norwegian authorities emphasize that simplification of public forms is important to improve communication between the users and the public sector. The idea is expressed like this in the preface of the guidelines:

"The proceeding transition to electronic reporting may be an important simplification measure for the respondents, but only if the Internet-based solutions are felt to be more user friendly than the old paper versions. By applying good pedagogical principles, electronic forms may also ensure a better understanding of the task, better validation of the data before submission, and by that even better response quality and more efficient processing by the relevant authority."

The objective of the ELMER guidelines is to meet the challenges of Internet design and pedagogics that are particular to web forms. WCAG requirements and W3C conventions have not been baked into the ELMER guidelines, but they shall not contain recommendations which are incompatible with these. In other words, ELMER is not the only set of guidelines to consider, when designing electronic forms, but the only one that concentrate on the form itself.

== Background ==
=== The first ELMER Project ===
During the summer of 2000, an interdisciplinary reference group on electronic reporting initiated the ELMER project. The project followed six enterprises over the period of one year in order to map out their reporting duties, and test simple solutions for electronic reporting based on familiar technology.

Among other things, the ELMER project presented an example for design of a complex web form. First and foremost the example demonstrated that the use of simple Internet technology opens up for new pedagogical opportunities which may make reporting to governmental authorities a lot easier.

=== The ELMER 2 Project ===
In 2005 the ELMER 2 project developed the example towards a comprehensive set of principles and specifications for the design of Internet-based forms. Business organizations, governmental bodies, usability experts and form developers were invited to submit suggestions and to take part in debates during the process. Open workshops were held, and a number of authorities and experts wrote, read and commented contributions posted on the project discussion forum.

ELMER 2 has evolved through co-operation between enterprises and experts. The participants have experiences from designing forms for several agencies and suppliers, from the reception and use of the same forms by the inquirer, and from usability testing of ELMER1-based and other electronic forms in varied user groups.

== The guidelines ==
The Norwegian Ministry of Trade and Industry submitted the draft for public hearing in the autumn of 2005. The approved ELMER 2 guidelines was published in October 2006. The guidelines are being administered by the Brønnøysund Register Centre.
