= George Aylmer =

Irish officer of the Royal Navy

George Aylmer was an Irish officer of the Royal Navy during the seventeenth century.

Aylmer was born in Ireland, the son of Sir Christopher Aylmer, 1st Baronet of County Meath. His father and mother were part of the Old English community. He was the younger brother of Matthew Aylmer, 1st Baron Aylmer, who went on to become an admiral.

During the Nine Years' War, Aylmer was appointed to command the 50-gun ship of the line HMS Portland. He was killed in action against the French during the Battle of Bantry Bay on 11 May 1689.

== Bibliography ==
- Harris, Simon. Sir Cloudesley Shovell: Stuart Admiral. The History Press, 2001.
