= West Cliffe =

Village in Kent, England

Coordinates: 51.154°N 1.357°E

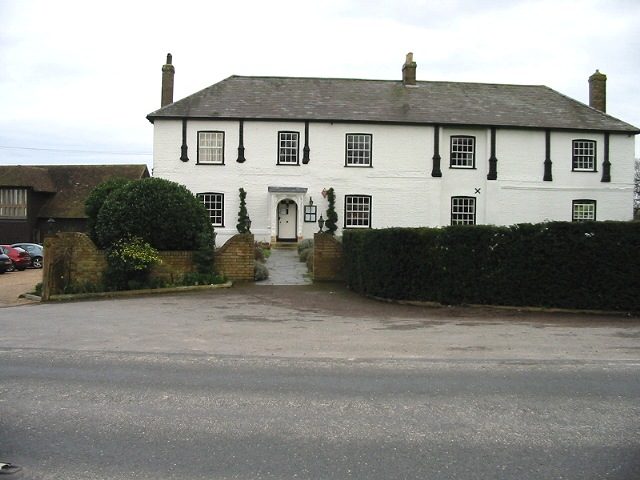
- Wallet's Court Hotel, West Cliffe

- Location within Kent
- OS grid reference: TR3444
- Civil parish: St. Margaret's At Cliffe
- District: Dover
- Shire county: Kent
- Region: South East
- Country: England
- Sovereign state: United Kingdom
- Post town: Dover
- Postcode district: CT15 6
- Police: Kent
- Fire: Kent
- Ambulance: South East Coast

West Cliffe or Westcliffe is a village and former civil parish, now in the parish of St. Margaret's At Cliffe, in the Dover district, in east Kent, England, near Dover. In 1931 the parish had a population of 88.

== History ==
The name "West Cliffe" means 'Cliff', the 'west' part later added in relation to adjacent St Margaret's at Cliffe. West Cliffe was recorded in the Domesday Book as Westclive. On 1 April 1935 the parish was abolished and merged with St Margaret's at Cliffe and East Langdon.
