= Matthew Whitworth-Aylmer, 5th Baron Aylmer =

British Army officer and colonial administrator

General The Right Honourable The Lord Aylmer GCB
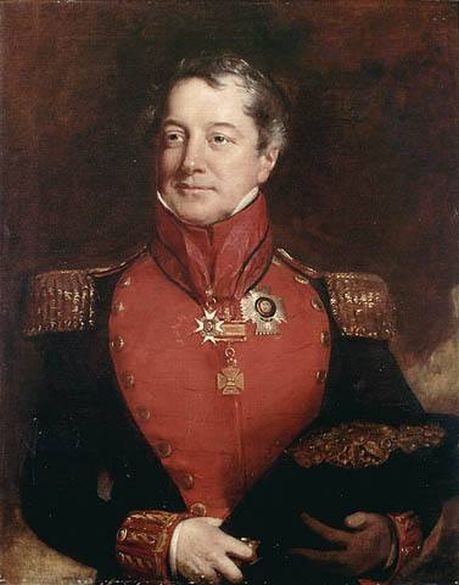
- c. 1835 portrait

Governor General of British North America
- In office 1830–1835
- Preceded by: Sir James Kempt
- Succeeded by: The Earl of Gosford

Personal details
- Born: 24 May 1775
- Died: 23 February 1850 (aged 74) Eaton Square, London
- Resting place: West Norwood Cemetery

Military service
- Allegiance: United Kingdom
- Branch/service: British Army
- Years of service: 1787–1850
- Rank: General
- Battles/wars: French Revolutionary Wars; Haitian Revolution; Expedition to Ostend; Anglo-Russian Invasion of Holland; Napoleonic Wars; Hanover Expedition; Peninsular War; Second Battle of Porto; Battle of Talavera; Battle of Bussaco; Battle of Fuentes de Oñoro; Battle of Vitoria; Battle of the Bidassoa; Battle of Nivelle; Battle of the Nive; Battle of Bayonne

Matthew Whitworth-Aylmer, 5th Baron Aylmer, GCB (24 May 1775 – 23 February 1850) was a British Army officer and colonial administrator.

== Napoleonic Wars ==
Aylmer was gazetted ensign in 1787, lieutenant in 1791 and major in 1800, after being held in a French prison for six months in 1798. His career continued as colonel in 1810, being aide-de-camp to King George III between 1810 and 1812 and then major general in 1813. He was present at most of the battles in the Peninsular War.

In 1814, following service in the French Revolutionary Wars and the Napoleonic Wars, he was appointed adjutant general of British forces in Ireland, where he remained until 1823.

== North American administration ==
After reaching the position of lieutenant-general in 1825, Aylmer was, in 1830, appointed commander of British military forces in North America as well as Governor General of British North America and Lieutenant Governor of Lower Canada.

Lord Aylmer had no previous experience as a civil administrator and no political experience. He was unable to pacify the growing demands in Lower Canada for responsible government and, in 1834, the radical Assembly of Lower Canada passed 92 resolutions of grievance including a demand that Aylmer be recalled. Lord Aylmer exacerbated ethnic tensions in Lower Canada by favouring the English over the French. The deterioration of the situation led to his recall in 1835. His administration may have been a contributing factor to the Lower Canada Rebellion of 1837.

== Return to England ==
Returning to England, Aylmer was promoted to the rank of general in 1845, but he never obtained a British peerage (his dignity was in the Irish peerage) or another administrative post.

He died at 15 Eaton Square, Belgravia, on 23 February 1850 and was buried at West Norwood Cemetery.

Aylmer's sister Rose Aylmer was the inspiration behind the poem of that name by Walter Savage Landor.

== Family ==
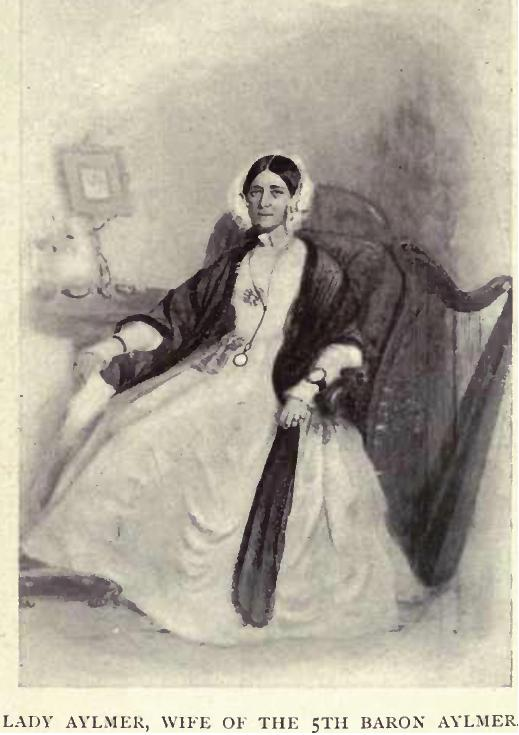
Lady Louisa Anne Aylmer

His sister was Rose Whitworth-Aylmer who travelled with their aunt, Anne Barbara, and her husband Sir Henry Russell, 1st Baronet to India in 1798. She fell ill with cholera and died in 1800. She has been immortalized by his friend and the famous British poet Walter Savage Landor in his Rose Aylmer eulogy.

General the Right Honourable Matthew Whitworth, 5th Lord Aylmer, G.C.B., married Louisa Anne Call, daughter of Sir John Call, Bart. on 4 August 1801. When her husband was appointed in 1830 to administer the government of Canada, as Governor-General, from February 1831 to August 1835, the couple entertained at the Castle of St. Louis, Quebec. During the cholera epidemic of 1831–32, she was interested in the relief of the sufferers. Since she was interested in education, she regularly visited and bestowed prizes in the schools. She served as the patroness of the Societe d'Education sous la direction des dames de Quebec. She died on 13 August 1862.

Military offices
Preceded by Sir John Murray	Colonel of the 56th (West Essex) Regiment of Foot; 1827–1832	Succeeded by Sir Hudson Lowe
Preceded by The Earl of Donoughmore	Colonel of the 18th (The Royal Irish) Regiment of Foot; 1832–1850	Succeeded by Sir John Forster FitzGerald
Government offices
Preceded by Sir James Kempt	Governor General of British North America; 1830–1835	Succeeded by The Earl of Gosford
Peerage of Ireland
Preceded by Henry Aylmer	Baron Aylmer; 1785–1850	Succeeded by Frederick Aylmer
