= William Hardres =

British landowner and Tory politician

Sir William Hardres, 4th Baronet (25 July 1686 – 7 July 1736) of Hardres Court, Upper Hardres, Kent was a British landowner and Tory politician who sat in the House of Commons in two periods between 1711 and 1735.

Hardres was the son of Sir Thomas Hardres, 3rd Baronet and his wife Ursula Rooke, daughter of Sir William Rooke of Horton, Kent. He inherited the baronetcy on the death of his father on 23 February 1688. He was described as a person of great and ready wit, and in comfortable circumstances as 'a single gentleman with a £1,000 p.a. estate', and was seen as a man of great potential.

Hardres was returned unopposed as Tory Member of Parliament (MP) for Kent at a by-election on 13 June 1711. In February 1712 he was involved in preparing a bill to facilitate the completion of a chapel of ease at Deal. At the 1713 British general election, he was returned instead as MP for Dover. He was consulted on matters relating to Dover and the Cinque Ports and in March 1714, he and his fellow MP wrote a joint letter to Dover about presenting a petition for a bill to protect the port's fishing grounds. He retired at the 1715 British general election.

Out of Parliament ha remained active as a Justice of the Peace. At the 1722 British general election, he stood for parliament at Canterbury but was defeated. He was returned as MP for Canterbury at the 1727 British general election. He voted against the Government on the Hessians in 1730, which was his only recorded vote. He was returned again at the 1734 British general election but a petition was presented against him and he retired on 11 April 1735, possibly also because of gout.

Hardres married Eliza Disher, widow of William Disher and daughter of Richard Thomas of Lamberhurst under a licence dated 26 March 1712. He died at Hardres Court aged 49 from what was called at the time "gout in the stomach" and was buried in the church of Upper Hardres. He and his wife had two sons and daughters, but only one son and one daughter survived him. His son William succeeded to the baronetcy.

Parliament of Great Britain
Preceded by Sir Cholmeley Dering, Bt; Percival Hart	Member of Parliament for Kent; 1711–1713; With: Percival Hart	Succeeded by Sir Edward Knatchbull, Bt; Percival Hart
Preceded by Matthew Aylmer; Philip Papillon	Member of Parliament for Dover; 1713–1715; With: Philip Papillon	Succeeded by Matthew Aylmer; Philip Papillon
Preceded by Sir Thomas Hales, Bt; Samuel Milles	Member of Parliament for Canterbury; 1727–1735; With: Sir Thomas Hales, Bt	Succeeded by Sir Thomas Hales, Bt; Thomas May
Baronetage of England
Preceded by Thomas Hardres	Baronet (of Hardres Court); 1727–1735	Succeeded by William Hardres
