= Acrise =

Civil parish in Kent, England

Coordinates: 51.138°N 1.136°E

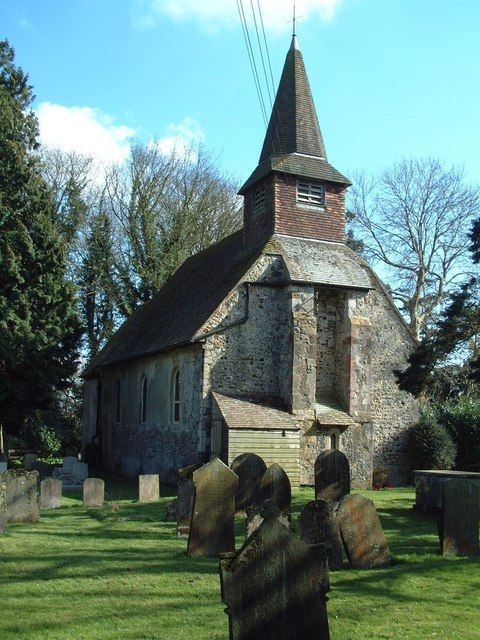
- St Martin's

- Location within Kent
- Population: 172 (2011)
- District: Folkestone and Hythe
- Shire county: Kent
- Region: South East
- Country: England
- Sovereign state: United Kingdom
- Post town: Folkestone
- Postcode district: CT18
- Dialling code: 01303
- Police: Kent
- Fire: Kent
- Ambulance: South East Coast
- UK Parliament: Folkestone and Hythe

Acrise /ˈeɪkrɪs/ is an ecclesiastical and civil parish in the Folkestone and Hythe district, Kent, England, located between Elham and Densole and about six miles north of Folkestone. The settlement derives its name from Old English, 'Acrise' being a development of the Old English term for "Oak Rise", the parish being on a small hill, still populated with old oak trees.

The parish includes three particularly significant buildings. The 18th century Acrise Place is a manor house. The medieval church of St Martin (which now stands within the grounds of the big house) is of Norman origin. The Old Rectory is a very fine example of a parsonage dwelling of its era and is a grade II listed building.

King John met the legate of Pope Innocent III on the outskirts of Acrise in 1214, in a plea to lift the Papal Interdict of 1208.
