= Jane Papillon =

English letter writer

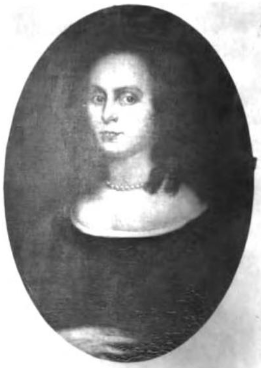
- Born: 18 March 1627; Godmersham
- Died: 12 July 1698 (aged 71); London

Jane Papillon born Jane Broadnax (16 March 1627 – 12 July 1698) was an English letter writer.

== Life ==
Papillon was born in Godmersham in 1627.

She married her cousin, Thomas Papillon, on 30 October 1651 despite the objections of her parents, Thomas and Jane Broadnax.

Thomas was a merchant and a member of the influential Mercers Company. He would have a fortune in the region of £18,000 in time but he had already had to spend time exiled in France and in Newgate Prison after supporting a rebellion against parliament.

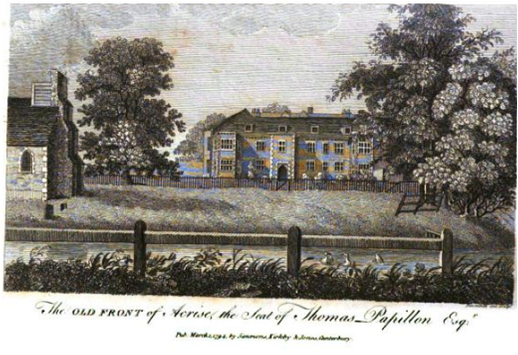
Acrise Place in the 1790s

In 1666 Acrise Place was purchased. Jane managed this property and their home in Fenchurch Street. Her husband went to Breda in the Netherlands on behalf of the East India Company. Jane wrote to him including detailed records of her management of their households, but also including news of their tenants and local news and events. Her letters of 1667 and 1668 are extant. One of the bits of news is a report of 1,200 Dutch people who had taken Mersea Island in Essex and were advancing on the town of Colchester. More recent accounts note that there was talk on an invasion and soldiers were sent to defend the area but the invasion never happened.

== Private life ==
Papillon and her husband had three sons and five daughters. Four of these children survived to be adults. Her daughter Elizabeth married the judge Sir Edward Ward.

== Death and legacy ==
Papillon died in London in 1698 having already written a letter to her husband to tell him of the birth of their grandchild to their son and his wife. Her funeral sermon was published by her nephew, John Snow, as Of Long Life and Old Age.
