= John Aylmer (classicist) =

British writer

- Born: Hampshire, England
- Died: 5 April 1672; Petersfield, England
- Occupation: Poet

Academic background
- Education: Winchester College
- Alma mater: University of Pennsylvania

Academic work
- Discipline: Classics
- Institutions: New College, Oxford

John Aylmer (died 5 April 1672) was born in Hampshire, educated at Winchester College, and admitted as a perpetual fellow of New College, Oxford, after two years of probation. In 1652, he took degrees in civil law, that of doctor being completed in 1663, being then and before accounted an excellent Grecian, and a good Greek and Latin poet, as appears by this book, which he composed when a young man: Musae sacrae seu Jonas, Jeremiae Threni, & Daniel Graeco redditi Carmine (Oxon. 1652. oct.), and also by diverse Greek and Latin verses, dispersed in various books. He died at Petersfield on Good Friday, 5 April 1672, and was buried in the church at Havant in Hampshire.

== Sources ==
- Wood, Anthony A. and Philip Bliss. Athenae Oxonienses: an Exact History of all the Writers and Bishops who Have Had their Education in the University of Oxford; to which Are Added the Fasti, or, Annals of the Said University / by Anthony A Wood; with Additions, and a Continuation by Philip Bliss. new ed. London [et al.]: Rivington; Parker, 1813–1820. 6 pts. in 4 vols.
