= Isaac Whood =

English painter (1689–1752)

Isaac Whood (1689 – 24 February 1752) was an English painter, who was known for being a great imitator of the painting styles of Godfrey Kneller.

== Biography ==
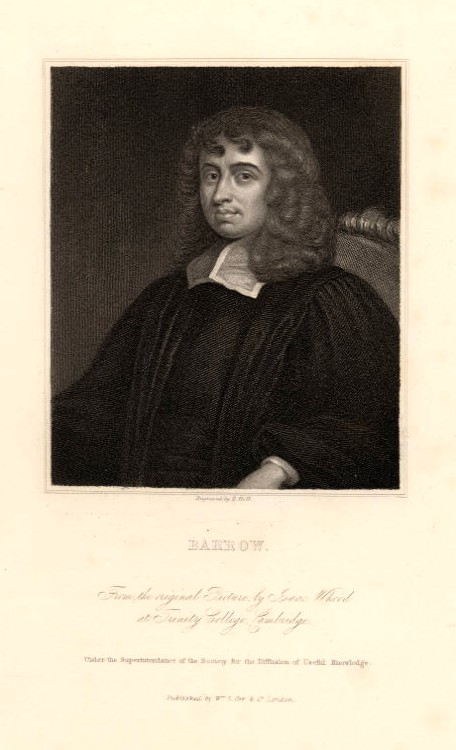
Engraving by William Holl the Younger, from a portrait by Whood of Isaac Barrow.

Born 1689, Whood practised for many years as a portrait-painter in Lincoln's Inn Fields, London. His portraits of ladies were considered some of the best of the time.

He was especially patronised by John Russell, 4th Duke of Bedford, for whom he painted numerous portraits of members of the Spencer and Russell families, destined for Woburn Abbey; some of these were copied by Whood from other painters. At Winchester College there are portraits of twelve gentleman commoners from 1731. At Cambridge there are portraits by Whood at Trinity College, including one of Isaac Barrow, and at Trinity Hall. There is a portrait of Archbishop William Wake by Whood at Lambeth Palace, painted in 1736.

Some of his portraits were engraved in mezzotint, notably one of Laurent Delvaux the sculptor, engraved by Alexander Van Haecken. Whood's drawings include some in chalk or blacklead. In 1743, he executed a series of designs to illustrate Samuel Butler's Hudibras. The portrait of Joseph Spence prefixed to his Anecdotes was engraved from a portrait by Whood.

== Death ==
Whood died in Bloomsbury Square, London, on 24 February 1752.

== Sources ==
Attribution

This article incorporates text from a publication now in the public domain: "Whood, Isaac". Dictionary of National Biography. London: Smith, Elder & Co. 1885–1900.
