= Thomas Papillon =

English merchant and politician

Thomas Papillon (6 September 1623 – 5 May 1702) was an English merchant and politician, an influential figure in the City of London for half a century. He served as a Commissioner for the Victualling of the Navy from 1689 to 1699.

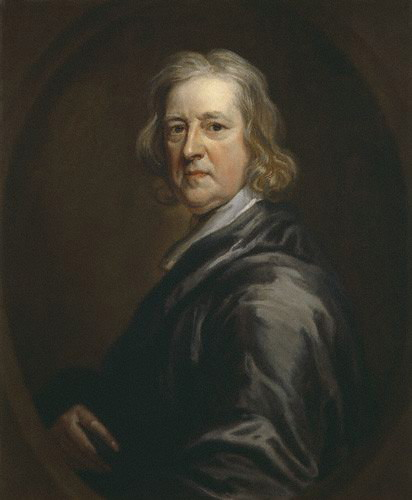
Thomas Papillon, 1698 portrait by Godfrey Kneller

== Early life ==
He was the third son of David Papillon by his second wife, Anne Marie Calandrini, he was born at Roehampton House, Roehampton, on 6 September 1623. He went to school at Drayton, Northamptonshire, was articled in 1637 to Thomas Chambrelan, a London merchant, and in the following year was apprenticed to the Mercers' Company, of which he received the freedom in 1646.

== Under the Commonwealth ==
Papillon was implicated in the riots of 26 July 1647, when a mob broke into St. Stephen's and forced Parliament to rescind the recent ordinance by which the City of London had been deprived of the control of its militia. When the Independent faction regained the ascendency over the Presbyterians (August), he slipped off to France to avoid arrest, but returned in November, and was committed to Newgate Prison during the following February.

After some demur, Papillon was released on bail. About the same time he began business on his own account as a general merchant. Except to petition the Council of State against an illegal impost on lead in 1653, and to defend the autonomy of the French church, of which he was a deacon, against the Privy Council in 1657, he avoided public affairs until the Restoration of 1660.

== Under Charles II ==
Papillon was placed on the council of trade and foreign plantations, and in 1663 on the directorate of the East India Company, which he had joined on its reconstruction in 1657. He continued to serve on the directorate until 1670, and in 1667 watched the interests of the company at Breda during the negotiations with the Dutch Republic. He was also on the directorate from 1675 to 1682, with the exception of 1676, when, having given offence to the king, he was excluded at his instance. The reason of his disfavour at court was probably the resistance which he had offered in the law courts to a claim by the farmers of excise for excessive duty on brandy. He was deputy-governor of the company in 1680 and 1681.

Papillon was returned to Parliament as Member for Dover on 11 February 1673, and kept the seat until the dissolution of 28 March 1681. During that period he was an effective speaker, and sat on 68 committees. An adherent of the country party, he censured in committee of the whole house (March 1676) the pass system, under by English merchant ships had no protection on the high seas unless provided with government licenses; and supported (18 February 1678) the motion for making the army vote conditional on the disclosure of foreign alliances. A strong Protestant, he moved on 18 November 1678 the committal to the Tower of London of the secretary of state, Sir Joseph Williamson. He credited the Popish Plot allegations.

A free-trader, Papillon opposed in May 1679 the bill for continuing the act prohibiting the importation into England of Irish cattle. Against the court, he identified himself with the defence of the threatened corporation of Dover. When Anthony Ashley Cooper, 1st Earl of Shaftesbury was indicted at the Old Bailey (24 November 1681), he asserted the right of grand juries to examine witnesses in secret, though with no success.

Papillon's candidature for the shrievalty of London in 1682 became the occasion of a trial of strength between the court and the country parties. On 6 November 1684, a jury awarded Sir William Pritchard, whom Papillon had attacked for making a false return to a mandamus to swear him in as sheriff, the sum of £10,000 damages in an action of false imprisonment. To avoid payment Papillon mortgaged his estates to his son-in-law, and left for Utrecht. A Treatise concerning the East India Trade: being a most profitable trade to the Kingdom, and best secured and improved by a company and joint stock. Wrote at the instance of Thomas Papillon, Esqr., in his house, and printed in the year 1680, was reprinted in 1696, in London.

== Under William and Mary ==
After the Glorious Revolution Papillon came home, and was returned to the Convention parliament for Dover on 10 January 1689. He retained that seat until 1695. On 25 October of that year he was elected for the City of London, which he continued to represent until the dissolution of 19 December 1700. Soon after his return he joined the New East India Company—he had terminated his connection with the old company after the defeat of a scheme for its reconstruction on a broader basis in 1681—and in January 1693–4 was chairman of the committee of the House of Commons on the affair of the Redbridge, an East Indiaman, arrested in the River Thames as an 'interloper' by the Admiralty at the instance of the old company. He then worked towards the ultimate amalgamation of the two companies.

In November 1689 Papillon was appointed a Commissioner for the Victualling of the Navy, holding the post until his resignation on 26 May 1699. He died in London on 5 May 1702. His remains were interred on 21 May in the parish church at Acrise, Kent, the manor of which he had purchased in 1666.

== Family ==
Papillon married, in Canterbury Cathedral, on 30 October 1651, the letter writer Jane, daughter of Thomas Broadnax of Godmersham, Kent; she died in 1698. They had eight children and four survived. Their children included Elizabeth, born on 27 July 1658, who married on 30 March 1676 Edward Ward; and Philip (1660–1736), his heir-at-law, born on 26 November 1660, M.P. for Dover in the reign of Queen Anne.

Papillon's eldest brother, Philip Papillon (1620–1641), born on 1 January 1620, graduated B.A. from Exeter College, Oxford, in 1638, and proceeded M.A. in 1641, in which year he died. He published the tragedy of his friend and fellow collegian Samuel Hardinge, entitled Sicily and Naples, in 1640, against the author's wish. With Hardinge and other members of Exeter College, he wrote verses urging William Browne of Tavistock to publish his promised continuation of Britannia's Pastorals.

== Sources ==
- "Papillon, Thomas" . Dictionary of National Biography. London: Smith, Elder & Co. 1885–1900.

Attribution

This article incorporates text from a publication now in the public domain: "Papillon, Thomas". Dictionary of National Biography. London: Smith, Elder & Co. 1885–1900.
