= Buckfast Tonic Wine =

Caffeinated fortified wine

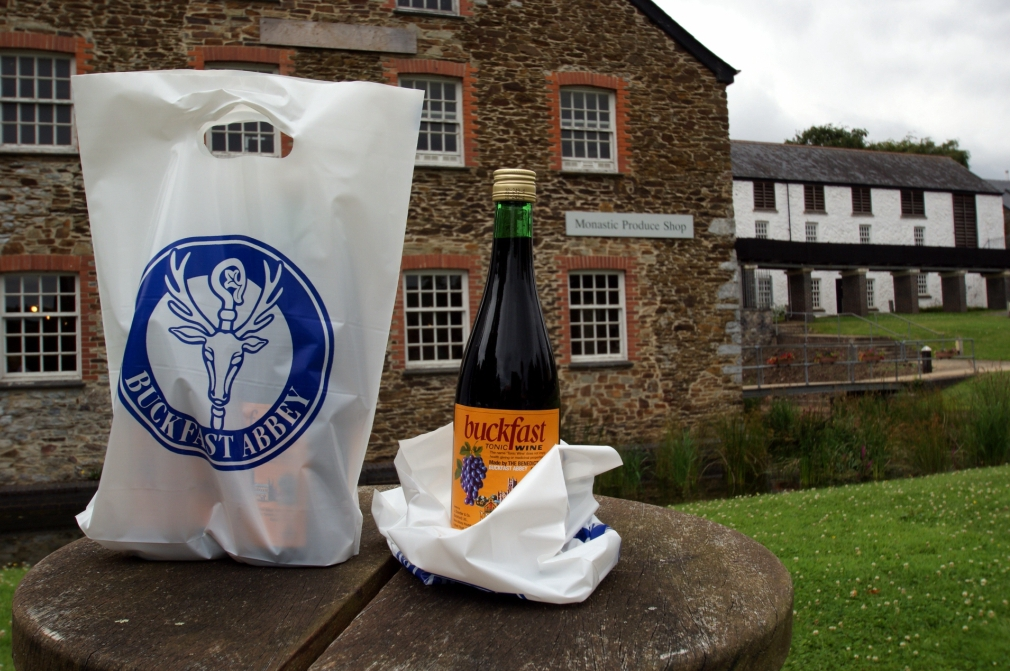
- A bottle of Buckfast Tonic Wine, bought from the Buckfast Abbey shop
- Type: Fortified wine with caffeine
- Manufacturer: Buckfast Abbey
- Distributor: J. Chandler & Company (Great Britain); James E McCabe Ltd (Northern Ireland); Richmond Marketing (Republic of Ireland)
- Origin: Devon
- Introduced: 1880
- Alcohol by volume: 15.0% (UK); 14.8% (Ireland)
- Ingredients: fortified wine, caffeine
- Variants: Green Bottled (UK); Brown Bottled (Ireland)
- Related products: Mistella
- Website: buckfast.org.uk/tonic-wine

Buckfast Tonic Wine is a caffeinated alcoholic drink consisting of fortified wine with added caffeine, originally made by monks at Buckfast Abbey in Devon, England. It is now made under a licence granted by the monastery, and distributed by J. Chandler & Company in Great Britain, James E McCabe Ltd in Northern Ireland, and Richmond Marketing Ltd in Ireland. The wine's distributor reported record sales of £43.2 million as of March 2017. More recent financial disclosures indicate continued growth.

Despite being marketed as a tonic, Buckfast has become notorious in Scotland for its association with ned culture and "antisocial behaviour."

== History ==
The wine, which is still manufactured using many of the same ingredients, is based on a traditional recipe from France. The Benedictine monks at Buckfast Abbey first made the tonic wine in the 1890s. It was originally sold in small quantities as a medicine using the slogan "Three small glasses a day, for good health and lively blood". The product was formerly sold through chemists’ shops.

In 1927, the Abbey lost its licence to sell wine. In response, the monks entered into a distribution arrangement with a newly created firm, J. Chandler & Co. (Buckfast) Ltd, which acted as sole agent and distributor of Buckfast Tonic Wine. At the same time, the recipe was changed to be less of a patent medicine and more of a medicated wine.

Company records indicate that J. Chandler & Co. (Buckfast) Ltd was incorporated on 23 May 1927 and continues to file accounts, with the most recent covering the period to 31 March 2025.

The wine, which comes in distinct brands depending on the market, has achieved popularity in working class, student, and bohemian communities in the United Kingdom and Ireland. In the Republic of Ireland, Buckfast is packaged in a darker bottle, has a slightly lower alcoholic strength, and lacks the vanillin flavouring present in the British version. Buckfast sold in Northern Ireland, where it has been nicknamed "Lurgan champagne", is the same as that sold in the rest of the UK.

== Versions ==
Buckfast contains 15% alcohol in the 750 ml green-bottled UK version, and 14.8% in the brown-bottled Republic of Ireland version, which equates to roughly 11.25 UK units of alcohol.

Both versions of the drink contain phosphate and glycerophosphate, each of these as the sodium and/or potassium salt.

The "brown bottle" Buckfast sold in Ireland has a caffeine content similar to an espresso coffee (60 mg/100 ml) and higher than Red Bull (32 mg/100 ml). The UK-sold "green bottle" Buckfast has a caffeine content higher than black tea but lower than coffee (37,5 mg/100 ml).

=== Buckfast Tonic Wine (green bottle) ===
Sold in the United Kingdom.

- Fortified wine based aperitif, 15% v/v.
- Sodium glycerophosphate, an emulsifier.
- Dipotassium phosphate, a protein stabiliser
- Disodium phosphate, a stabiliser and emulsifier.
- Caffeine, 0.0375%w/v
- Vanillin

=== Buckfast Tonic Wine (brown bottle) ===
Sold exclusively within the Republic of Ireland.

- Fortified wine, 14.8% alcohol
- Sodium and potassium glycerophosphates – both measured at 0.65% w/v
- Disodium phosphate
- Caffeine – 0.055% w/v
- Sulphite preservatives

== Antisocial image ==
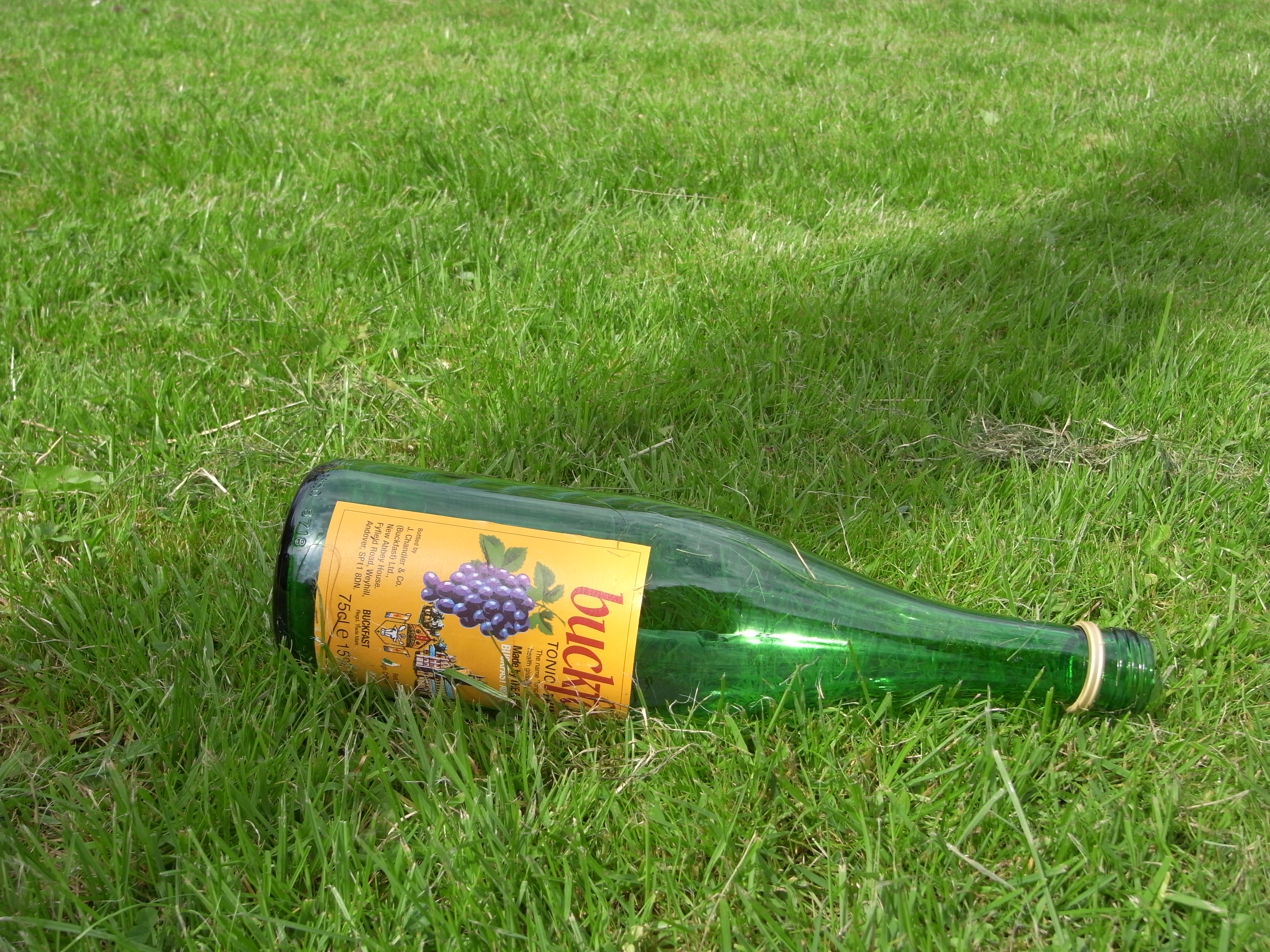
Buckfast's perception as being involved with street drinking, public intoxication and anti-social behaviour has caused controversy in Scotland.

In certain parts of Scotland, Buckfast is associated with drinkers who are prone to anti-social behaviour when drunk, especially those under 18 years old. The drink has a very high caffeine content, with each 750 ml bottle containing 281 mg of caffeine, the equivalent of eight cans of cola. It has been suggested that this may cause it to act as a stimulant, while removing inhibitions, self-control and a feeling of having drunk enough, though research into similar drinks has failed to find clear evidence for the latter effect. A diet of four bottles a day has been described in a Scottish court as 'not conducive to a long life'. Academic literature has described Buckfast’s public positioning in Scotland as contested, framed "between acceptability and transgression".

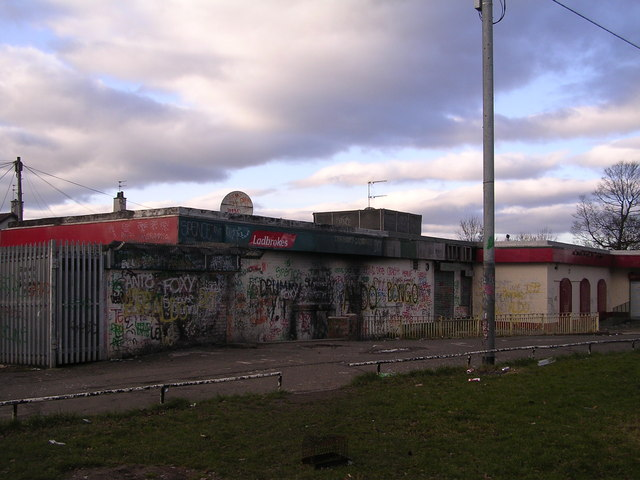
Buckfast has been viewed as emblematic of the problems of areas of Scotland suffering from deindustrialisation, such as this disused betting shop in Easterhouse.

The beverage has entered the popular lexicon with nicknames such as "Wreck the Hoose Juice", "Commotion Lotion", "Cumbernauld Rocket Fuel", "Mrs. Brown", "Buckie Baracas", "Coatbridge Table Wine", "Jakey Juice" , and a bottle of "What the hell are you looking at?" It has earned the unofficial slogan, "Buckfast: gets you fucked fast." The drink's prominence within the "Buckfast/Buckie Triangle" – an area east of Glasgow between Airdrie, Coatbridge and Bellshill – has raised concern. The glass bottle has been blamed for allegedly contributing to litter and providing drunkards with a weapon.

Several Scottish politicians and social activists have singled out Buckfast tonic wine as being particularly responsible for crime, disorder, and general social deprivation in these communities. There have been numerous calls for the drink to be banned (either throughout the country or in certain areas or shops), made more expensive to dissuade people from buying it, or sold in plastic bottles to reduce glassing incidents. Helen Liddell, former Secretary of State for Scotland, called for the wine to be banned.

In 2005, Scottish Justice Minister Cathy Jamieson suggested that retailers should stop selling the wine. On a subsequent visit to Auchinleck within her constituency, she was greeted by teenagers chanting, "Don't ban Buckie". All of these initiatives have been countered by lawyers acting for Buckfast distributors, J. Chandler & Company, in Andover. A further consequence was that Buckfast sales increased substantially in the months following Jamieson's comments.

In September 2006, Andy Kerr, the Scottish Executive's Health Minister, described the drink as "an irresponsible drink in its own right" and a contributor to anti-social behaviour. The distributors denied the claims and accused him of showing "bad manners" and a "complete lack of judgement" regarding the drink. Kerr met with J. Chandler & Company to discuss ways of lessening Buckfast's impact on west Scotland but the talks broke up without agreement. Three months later, Jack McConnell, First Minister of Scotland, stated that Buckfast had become "a badge of pride amongst those who are involved in antisocial behaviour." In response the distributors accused the Scottish Executive of trying to avoid having to deal with the consequences of failed social policy and the actual individuals involved in antisocial behaviour by blaming it on the drinks industry."

In January 2010, a BBC investigation revealed that Buckfast had been mentioned in 5,638 crime reports in the Strathclyde area of Scotland from 2006 to 2009, equating to an average of three per day. In 2017, Scottish Police reported there had been 6,500 crimes related to the drink in the previous two years. One in 10 of those offences had been violent and 114 times in that period a Buckfast bottle was used as a weapon. A survey at a Scottish young offenders' institution showed that of the 117 people who drank alcohol before committing their crimes, 43 per cent said they had drunk Buckfast. In another study of litter around a typical council estate in Scotland, 35 per cent of the items identified as rubbish were Buckfast bottles.

In 2016, a sheriff said there was a "very definite association between Buckfast and violence" while sentencing a man for hitting a 15-year-old boy over the head with a bottle at a birthday party. In January 2018, a trial at the High Court in Edinburgh heard that a man had consumed lager and a whole bottle of Buckfast before ferociously stabbing a workmate.

In July 2017, the British trade magazine The Grocer reported that increased sales of Buckfast in southeast England had pushed the drink up to 91 on the UK's top 100 alcoholic brands. The increased sales followed a marketing campaign to improve the drink's image.

In 2017, thousands of empty Buckfast bottles were recovered during a clean-up of the Claddagh Basin in Galway, Ireland.

Policy responses in Scotland have included the introduction of Minimum Unit Pricing (MUP) for alcohol. Subsequent reporting has examined the relationship between Buckfast and pricing policy; for example, the drink was noted among a small number of alcoholic products whose price fell after the introduction of MUP in 2018, while sales increased in the following year.

The MUP was continued following a 2024 parliamentary review, with the minimum price increased from £0.50 to £0.65 per unit. The revised rate came into force on 30 September 2024. The change was implemented through The Alcohol (Minimum Price per Unit) (Scotland) Amendment Order 2024. A contemporaneous report also noted parliamentary approval of the increase in April 2024, with implementation later that year.

=== Manufacturer's response ===
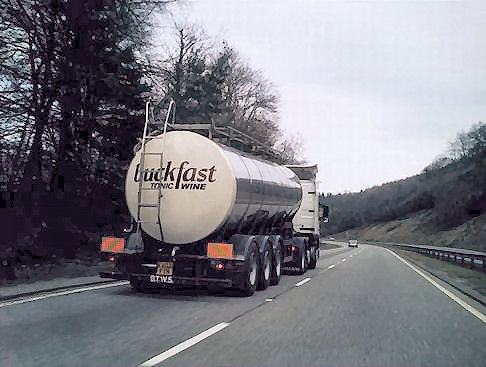
A Buckfast Wine tanker on the A38 in Devon

The monks of Buckfast Abbey and their distribution partner, J. Chandler & Company, deny that their product is harmful, saying that it is responsibly and legally enjoyed by the great majority of purchasers. They point out that the areas identified with its acute misuse have been economically deprived for decades and Buckfast represents less than one per cent of total alcohol sales in Scotland. Abbot of Buckfast Abbey David Charlesworth has said that the tonic wine his monastery produces "is not made to be abused".

In February 2013, J. Chandler & Company applied to the Court of Session in Edinburgh to stop Strathclyde Police from marking bottles of Buckfast so they could trace where under-age drinkers bought them. A company spokesman complained, "This is discrimination at the highest level. Buckfast is no more involved in crime than any other brand of alcohol". A former head of the Scottish Police Federation said: "Buckfast, the distributors and the lawyers who act on behalf of the monks refuse, point blank, to take any responsibility for the antisocial behaviour that's caused by the distribution and the consumption of Buckfast. They even refuse to change the glass bottles to plastic bottles despite overwhelming evidence that large areas in play parks and certain areas in Scotland are littered with this green glass".

In February 2014, the case was settled without any judgment being made by the court. Assistant Chief Constable Wayne Mawson of Police Scotland apologised to J. Chandler & Co for asking a shopkeeper to stop selling Buckfast and gave written undertakings not to include the product in any bottle-marking scheme, unless it has "reasonable grounds" for doing so, and "not to request licensed retailers, situated anywhere in Scotland, to cease stocking for sale Buckfast Tonic Wine".

In 2016 sales of Buckfast Tonic Wine reached record yearly profits of £8.8 million. The abbey trust, which is a shareholder of the Hampshire-based wine's distributor and seller, J. Chandler, gets a royalty fee for every bottle sold. Although the trust declined to release specific sales figures, it said it "strives to work with J. Chandler and Co to ensure that the tonic wine is marketed and distributed responsibly".

For the financial year ended 31 March 2024, J. Chandler & Company reported turnover of £55.7 million (up from £49.9 million) and profit before tax of £7.4 million (up from £5.9 million).

== Buckfast Day ==
In 2015, a "National Buckfast Day" was set up by fans to honour the tonic wine. The organisers designated the second Saturday of each May National Buckfast Day. The organisers decided to rename the day World Buckfast Day for 2016. By its third year, several celebratory events were held on different continents around the world.

== See also ==
- Ban on caffeinated alcoholic beverages, a list of bans on similar products
- Flavored fortified wines
- Parish ale, a British tradition of beer production by the church
- Vin Mariani, a wine fortified with cocaine endorsed by Pope Leo XIII
- White Lightning, a former English brand of cider also associated with delinquency
