= Fehrenbacher =

Fehrenbacher is a surname. Notable people with the surname include:

- Bob Fehrenbacher (fl. 2022), American politician
- Bruno Fehrenbacher (1895–1965), Abbot of Buckfast Abbey
- Don E. Fehrenbacher (1920–1997), American historian
