= Anscar Vonier =

Benedictine abbot and theologian (1875–1938)

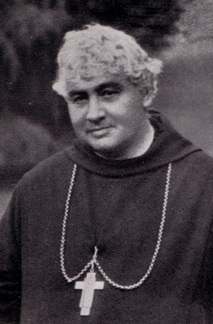
Abbot Anscar Vonier

Anscar Vonier OSB (11 November 1875 – 26 December 1938) was abbot of Buckfast Abbey from 1906 until his death in 1938.

== Life ==
Born Martin Vonier in Ringschnait near Biberach an der Riss, Württemberg on 11 November 1875 (the feast of Martin of Tours). He came from a large family that had emigrated to Württemberg from the Tyrol. His father was a farmer, who also ran a brickworks. After a few years, the family moved to Rissegg, where Martin attended the local school and became an altar boy.

In 1882, monks from the Abbey of la Pierre-qui-Vire, who had been exiled from France, purchased the site of a former monastery near Buckfastleigh in Devon. In 1888, Vonier was one of the youths recruited for the new abbey at Buckfast. The boys were first sent to a school in Beauvais run by the Holy Ghost Fathers in order to learn French. They arrived at Buckfast in the summer of 1889.

After four years in the alumnate, Vonier entered the novitiate in 1893, and was given the name "Anscar". He was professed the following year, and ordained in 1898 by bishop Charles Maurice Graham. In 1900, he was sent to study at St. Anselmo's in Rome, where he received a doctorate in philosophy.

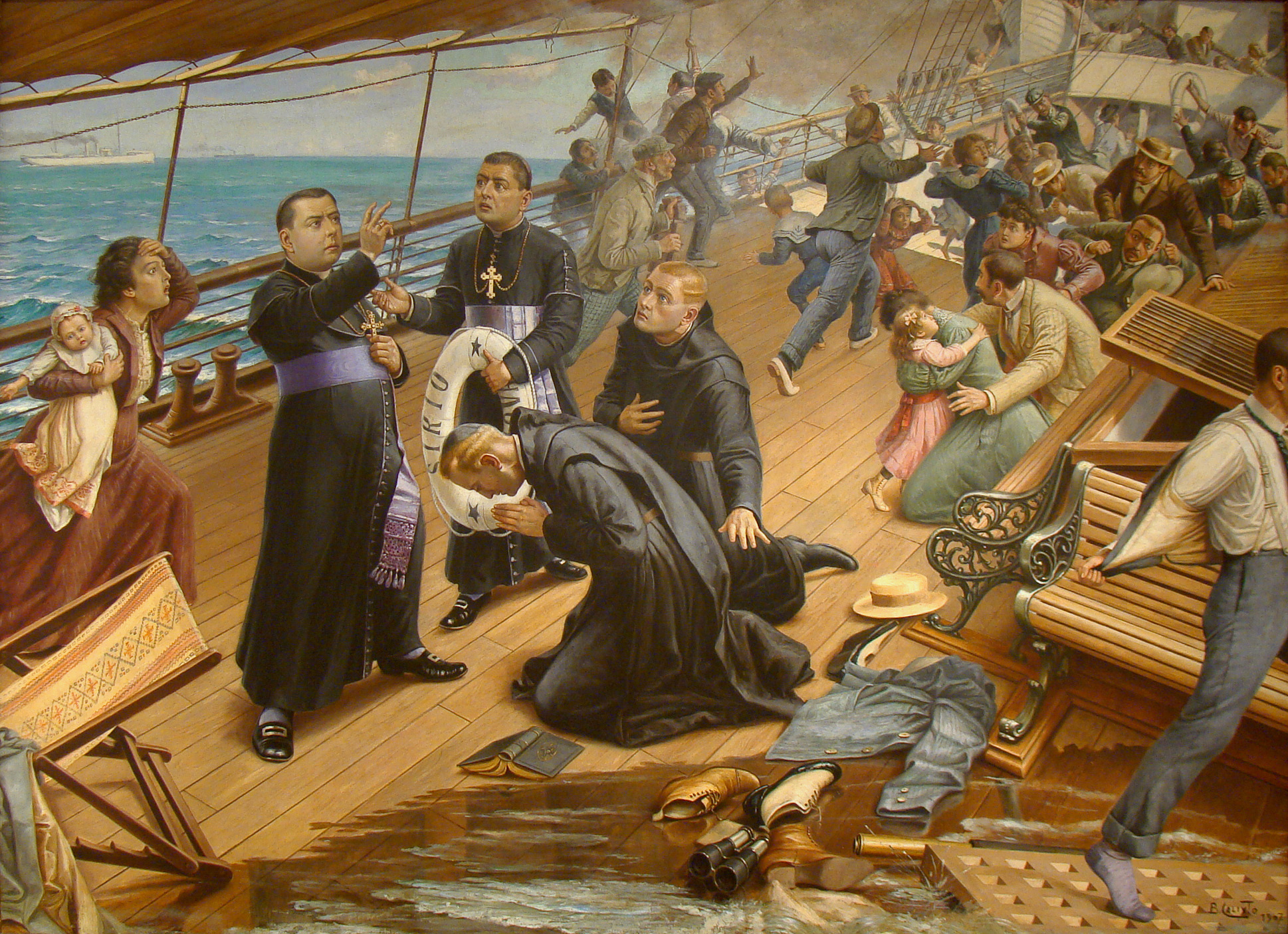
The sinking of the SS Sirio, by Benedito Calixto

In November 1905, Vonier was sent back to St. Anselmo's to teach philosophy. He was returning the following summer in the company of Buckfast's abbot, Boniface Natter, when their ship, the SS Sirio, was shipwrecked off the Spanish coast. Natter and Vonier ministered to the steerage passengers in the ensuing chaos. Dom Natter was among the many who drowned. When news of the sinking reached the Community at Buckfast it was believed that both Abbot and Vonier had perished and Requiem Masses were said for the repose of their souls. However, Vonier was saved by a fishing vessel.

On 14 September 1906 Vonier was elected by the community to succeed Boniface as the second abbot of Buckfast. He was thirty-one years old. Dom Vonier decided to rebuild the abbey church on the site of the original Cistercian church. The foundation stone was laid in January 1907.

He died on 26 December 1938 at Buckfast Abbey, and was buried there four days later.

== Work ==
- The Christian Mind
- The Personality of Christ
- The Victory of Christ
- The Divine Motherhood
- The Spirit and the Bride
- The People of God
- A Key to the Doctrine of the Eucharist
- The Human Soul and Its Relations with Other Spirits
- Christianus
- The Life of the World to Come
- The Angels
