= Buckfast Abbey =

Benedictine monastery in Devon, England

- Abbey Church of St Mary
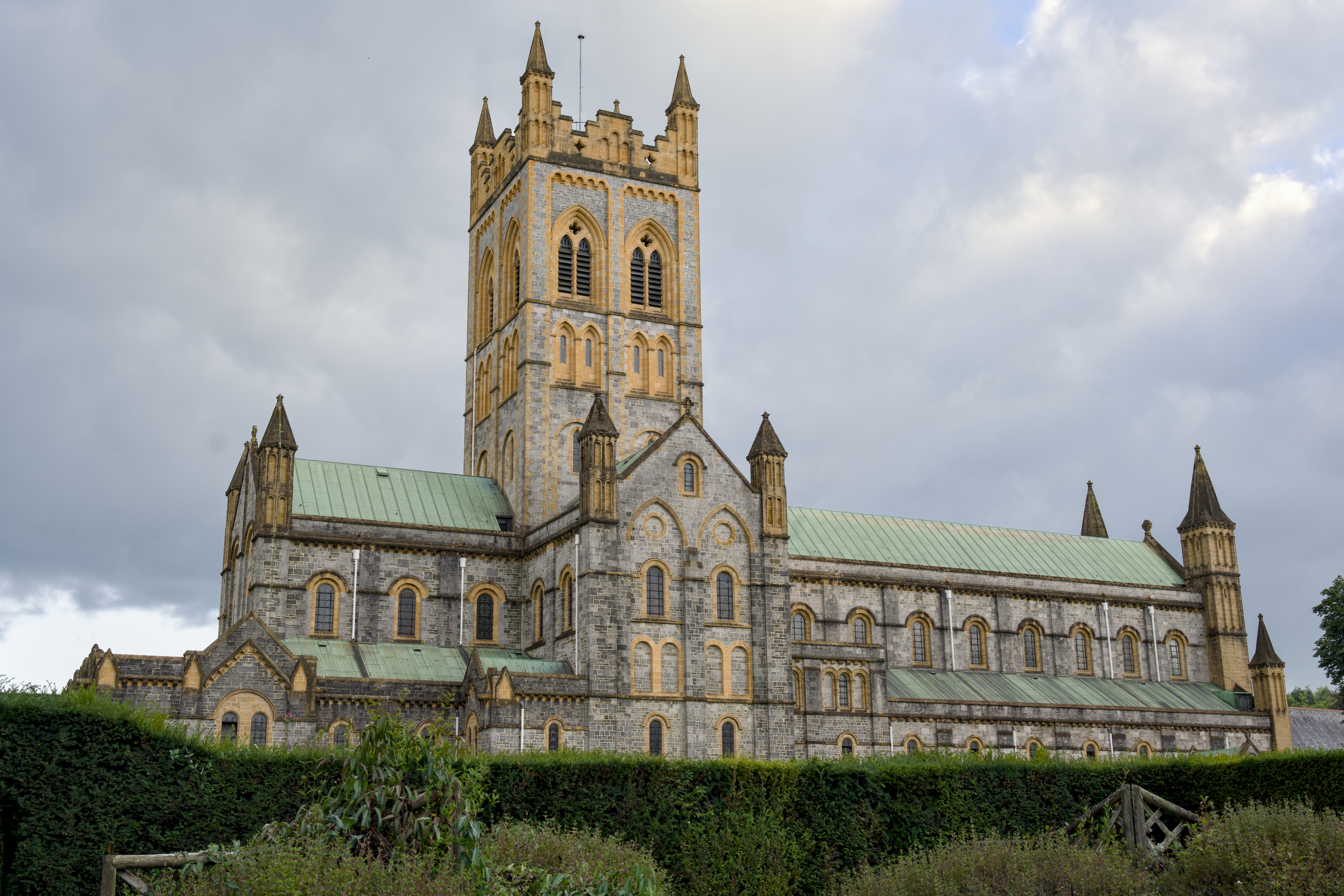

- Location within Dartmoor
- 50°29′34″N 3°46′32″W
- OS grid reference: SX741673
- Location: Buckfastleigh, Devon
- Country: England
- Denomination: Roman Catholic
- Website: www.buckfast.org.uk

History
- Status: Benedictine Monastery
- Founded: 28 October 1882
- Dedication: St Mary
- Consecrated: 25 August 1932

Architecture
- Functional status: Active
- Heritage designation: Grade II*
- Designated: 10 January 1951
- Architect: Frederick Walters
- Completed: 1937

Administration
- Province: Southwark
- Diocese: Plymouth
- Deanery: Torbay
- Parish: Buckfast

Clergy
- Abbot: Rt Rev. Dom David Charlesworth, O.S.B.

Buckfast Abbey forms part of an active Benedictine monastery at Buckfast, near Buckfastleigh, Devon, England. Buckfast first became home to an abbey in 1018. The first Benedictine abbey was followed by a Savignac, later Cistercian, abbey constructed on the site of the current abbey in 1134. The monastery was largely demolished after its dissolution in 1539. In 1882 the site was purchased by French Benedictines who refounded a monastery on the site. New monastic buildings incorporated the remaining Gothic house. Buckfast was formally reinstated as an abbey in 1902. Work on a new abbey church, which was constructed mostly on the footprint of the former Cistercian abbey, started in 1907. The church was completed in 1938 and the abbey joined the English Benedictine Congregation in 1960. As of 2020, the abbey has 13 monks.

== History ==
=== Early history ===
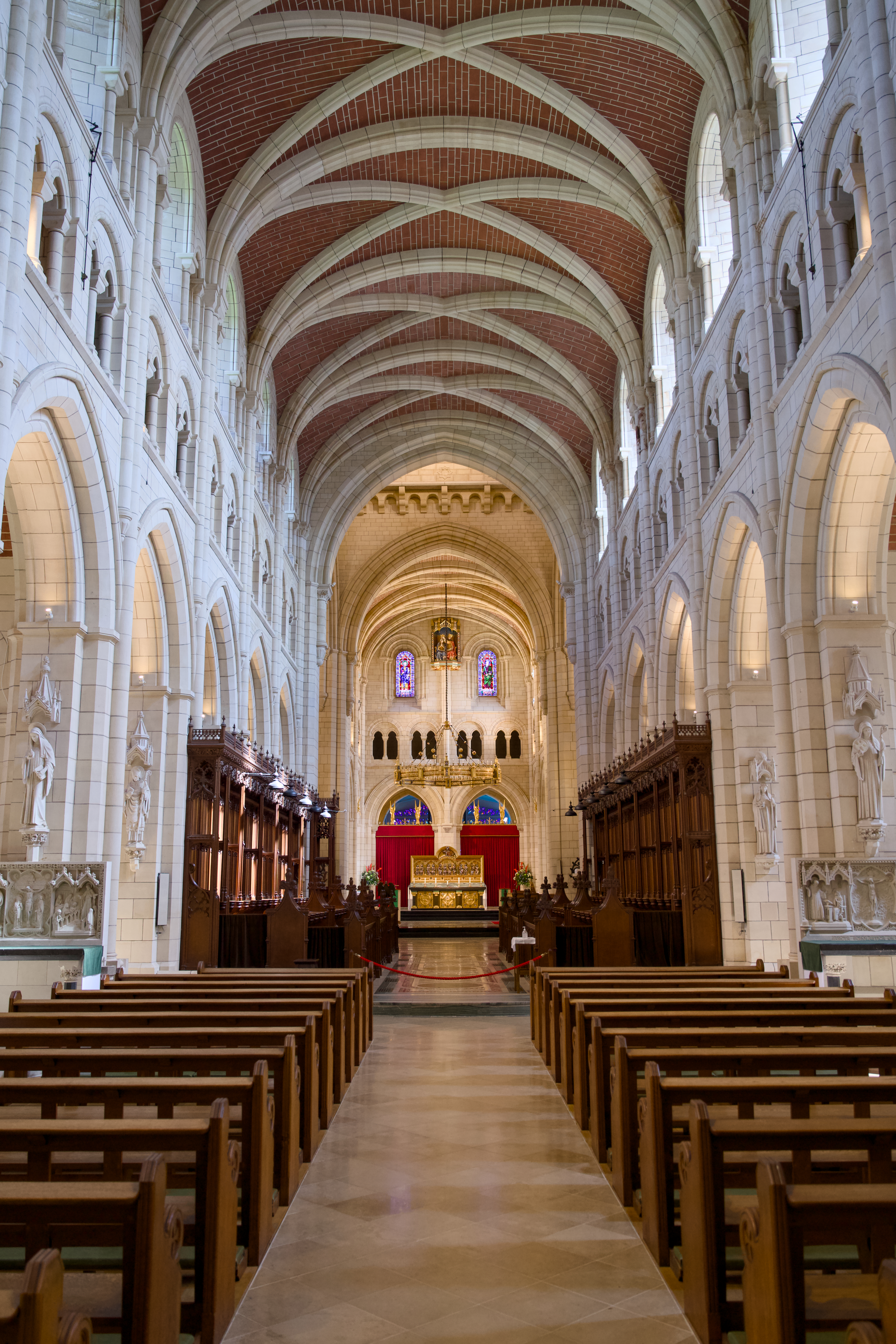
The nave of the Abbey church is in a mixture of Romanesque and Gothic styles

The first abbey at Buckfast was founded as a Benedictine monastery in 1018. The abbey was believed to be founded by either Aethelweard (Aylward), Earldorman of Devon, or King Cnut. This first monastery was "small and unprosperous", and the exact site is uncertain. Archaeological evidence suggests the monastery may have been located nearby at what is now Holy Trinity church in Buckfastleigh.

In 1134 or 1136, the abbey was established in its current position, King Stephen having granted Buckfast to the French Abbot of Savigny. This second abbey was home to Savignac monks. In 1147 the Savignac congregation merged with the Cistercian, and the abbey thereby became a Cistercian monastery. Following the conversion to the Cistercian Congregation, the abbey was rebuilt in stone. Limited excavation work undertaken in 1882 revealed that the monastery was built to the standard plan for Cistercian monasteries. At an uncertain point in the late 12th or 13th centuries the church was extended with aisles added to the presbytery. The buttressed chapel at the east end was probably a 14th century addition, and may have been a Lady Chapel. This would be unusual in a Cistercian abbey, as normally the entire church was dedicated to St Mary.

In medieval times the abbey became rich through fishing and trading in sheep wool. By the 14th century Buckfast was one of the wealthiest abbeys in the south-west of England. It had come to own "extensive sheep runs on Dartmoor, seventeen manors in central and south Devon, town houses in Exeter, fisheries on the Dart and the Avon, and a country house for the abbot at Kingsbridge". At Kingsbridge the abbey had the rights to a weekly market and an annual fair, leading to the growth of the town. The Black Death killed two abbots and many monks. By the mid 1300s, there were few left to maintain the buildings, some of which collapsed. By the mid 1400s, the abbey again flourished. The 19th century excavations suggested that there was major rebuilding work at this time, of which the tower attached to the abbot's house is the sole upstanding survival.

By the 16th century, the abbey was in decline. Only 22 new monks were tonsured between 1500 and 1539, and at the time of the abbey's dissolution in 1539, there were only 10 monks in residence. However, it was still one of the richer abbeys in the country, being assessed at £466 in the Valor Ecclesiasticus survey of 1535.

=== Dissolution ===
The last Abbot, Gabriel Donne (d.1558), surrendered the abbey on 25 February 1539 to Sir William Petre, acting as agent for King Henry VIII. At the time of dissolution there were nine other monks in residence. On 26 April 1539 Gabriel was granted an annual pension of £120. The other monks, who all co-signed the deed of surrender, received smaller pensions.

After the dissolution 1.5 tons of gold, gilt and silver was taken from the abbey to the Tower of London. The site was granted to the King who later granted it to others, including William Petre, the Secretary of State, and Sir Thomas Denys (c.1477–1561) of Holcombe Burnell in Devon. Denys had married Donne's sister Elizabeth and was Chamberlain of the Household to Cardinal Wolsey.

=== After dissolution ===
Following dissolution, the abbey site and its lands were granted by the crown to Sir Thomas Denys (c.1477–1561) of Holcombe Burnell, near Exeter, who stripped the buildings and "reduced them to ruins". The abbey site was subsequently used as a stone quarry.

In 1800, the site was purchased by local mill owner, Samuel Berry. Berry had the ruins demolished, constructing a Gothic style "castellated Tudor" mansion house, and a wool mill on the site in 1806. The Gothic house was constructed on the site of the abbey's former west cloister. The only pieces of the former abbey to escape demolition were some of the outer buildings – which were retained as farm buildings – and the tower from the former abbot's lodgings.

Over the next eighty years, the Buckfast site changed hands four times, finally falling into the hands of Dr. James Gale in 1872. Ten years later, Dr. Gale decided to sell the property, but was keen to offer it to a religious community. An advert was placed in The Tablet, describing the Abbey as "a grand acquisition could it be restored to its original purpose." Within six weeks of the sale, monks were again living at the abbey.

=== Reconstruction ===
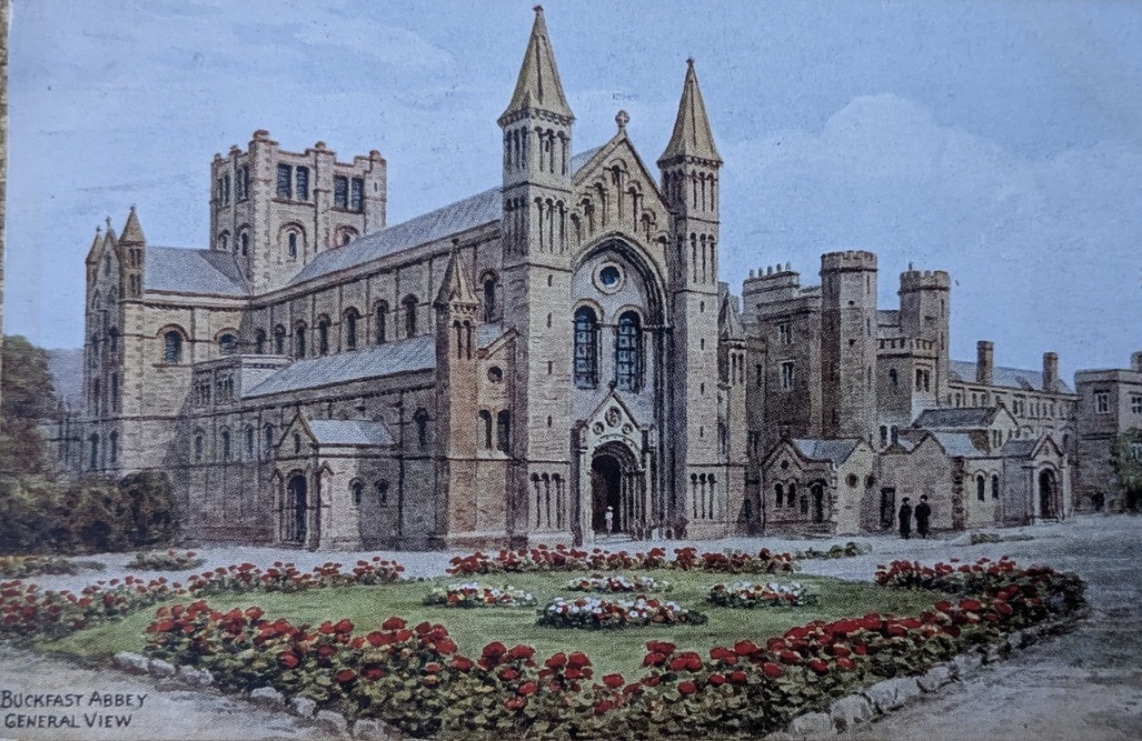
The abbey by A. R. Quinton, c. 1920, with unfinished tower

In 1880 the Abbey of la Pierre-qui-Vire was suppressed under a new French law and some of the monks went to St. Augustine's Priory in Ramsgate. The community of Ramsgate gave the French monks use of a property it owned in Leopardstown, Ireland. Learning that the property at Ramsgate was for sale, in 1882 "the whole site was purchased" by the French Benedictine monks for £4,700. On 28 October 1882, six Benedictine monks arrived at Buckfast.

Most of Samuel Berry's house was remodelled and incorporated into new claustral ranges which were begun in 1882. A temporary church was constructed to the south of these new buildings, with the current abbey church constructed between 1906 and 1938, mostly on the footprint of the Cistercian Abbey. The east-end does not follow the original plan. The new abbey church was built in the "Norman Transitional and Early English" styles, to the designs of architect Frederick Arthur Walters. There were never more than six monks working on the project at any one time, although the whole community had repaired the ancient foundations up to ground level.

Construction methods were primitive: wooden scaffolding was held together by ropes and no safety protection was worn by the monks. One monk fell 50 feet but survived. Three monks fell off a hoist without serious injury in 1931. Construction continued throughout World War I: some of the monks were of German nationality, but were not sent to an internment camp on condition that they remained confined to the Abbey grounds.

Buckfast was formally reinstated as an Abbey in 1902. Boniface Natter was blessed as the new abbot on 24 February 1903. Boniface Natter died at sea in 1906, when the SS Sirio was shipwrecked. His travelling companion Anscar Vonier became the next abbot and pledged to fulfill Natter's dying wish, to rebuild the abbey.

The only portion of the medieval claustral buildings which survives is the "much restored", former abbot's tower, which dates from 14th or 15th century. This was incorporated into the abbey's guesthouse, which was constructed between 1982 and 1994, when the abbey's precinct was rebuilt. The abbey's former well, which was located in the crypt of the former abbey and which may have dated from Saxon times, was destroyed when the new abbey was built.

==== The final phase ====
The Abbey Church was consecrated on 25 August 1932, after most of the building had been completed. Construction of the tower was completed in July 1937, with painting completed in December. In 1968, Dom Charles Norris completed the east window in the Blessed Sacrament Chapel, using the dalle de verre technique where coloured-glass tiles are shaped and formed into mosaics bound with resin.

Buckfast receives many visitors. Men are lodged in the guest house belonging to the monastery, and men and women in a restored building. Various tours are offered at the site. The hair shirt of Roman Catholic Saint Thomas More is now preserved at a side altar in the Abbey. In 2017, pipe organs were installed inside the Abbey church.

== The grounds ==
Fritillaria meleagris in the grounds of the abbey.

There is a conference and seminar centre, and a restaurant, the Grange. On the west side of the Abbey are two gardens, with plants ranging from herbs used in cooking or medicine to poisonous plants. Behind the public area is an enclosed garden for the monks. A bridge leads over the river to the abbey farm.

=== Buildings ===
The main building is the large cruciform church of 1906-38, dedicated to St Mary. Its style largely revives that of the late 12th century. This would be similar to the style of the original abbey, as depicted in the Buck Brothers' 1734 engraving. However, some features, like the tower, the use of vaulting throughout and the triforium, are more elaborate than the original church. Furthermore, the Blessed Sacrament chapel added to the east of the church in 1968 is in a more modern style. To the south of the church are the domestic buildings. These are arrayed around a central cloister, with the refectory in the south range and the monks' cells on the upper floors in the traditional manner. However, there are some discrepancies from the usual plan due to the incorporation of the medieval abbot's tower and the 19th century country house. For example, the chapter house is in a wing in the south-west corner, instead of in its usual position in the east range. The monastic buildings are in a similar style to the church.

The core of the abbey still sits within a walled precinct, with medieval gates to the north and south, and a modern one to the west (built in 1984). To the west of the church is a large 14th century range which now houses the bookshop, but was originally the guest hall. It was twice its present height and width, but was reduced in size following the Dissolution. At right angles to it is a smaller 16th century range, which is better preserved, with an original roof. Next door is a small Methodist chapel, an unlikely bedfellow with the Catholic abbey, which was built in 1881, the year before the monks returned. Adjoining the Northgate is the Grange, built in 1990 as a restaurant and tearooms.

== Self sufficiency ==
The Abbey is self-supporting, with a farm where vegetables are grown and bees, pigs and cattle are kept, a shop which sells wine, honey beeswax, fudge and other items made by religious communities throughout the world, and a gift shop, book shop, and restaurant.

=== Buckfast Tonic Wine ===
The monastery's most successful product is Buckfast Tonic Wine, a fortified wine which the monks began making in the 1890s. In 1927, the Abbey lost its licence to sell wine and as a result, the Abbot allowed wine merchants to distribute on behalf of the Abbey. At the same time, the recipe was changed to be less of a patent medicine and more of a medicated wine.

Its perceived links to violent anti-social behaviour – especially in Scotland – have been a controversial issue for the abbey which has employed a youth worker in one area affected.

Following a decision by Police Scotland to attach anti-crime labels to bottles in some areas, the distributor for Great Britain, J Chandler and Co. announced its intention to pursue legal action.

=== Beekeeping ===
The Buckfast Abbey monastic produce shop

Brother Adam, born Karl Kehrle in 1898 in Germany, died in 1996, was put in charge of the Abbey's beekeeping in 1919, and began extensive breeding work creating the honeybee now known as the Buckfast bee. Brother Adam had to replenish the bee colonies, as 30 of the monastery's 46 colonies had been wiped out by a disease known at the time as the Isle of Wight Disease, but later called Acarine. All the bees that died were of the Old British Black bee, a now extinct British strain of the A. m. mellifera.

The 16 hives that survived were descended from A. m. ligustica queens from the Ligurian Alps region of Italy. At the request of the government, Brother Adam helped in restocking the British Isles with his disease resistant Buckfast bees. Today the breeding of pedigree Buckfast bees is regulated by the Federation of European Buckfast Beekeepers (G.D.E.B.) in over twenty-six countries with numerous breeders.

Buckfast bees are no longer kept at the Abbey. Instead of commercial beekeeping with nearly 400 hives, today the focus at the Abbey's apiary is educational such as beekeeping courses, workshops, and honeybee experience days with their 4 hives.

== Schools ==
=== Buckfast Abbey Preparatory School ===
From 1967 until 1994, the abbey ran a prep school for boys and girls aged 7 to 13, but was obliged to close it as the school became financially non-viable due to dwindling numbers of boarders. Two former monks were later convicted and imprisoned for sexually abusing boys during this period.

=== St Boniface's Catholic College ===
With the outbreak of World War II, Plymouth-based St Boniface's Catholic College evacuated its pupils to Buckfast Abbey between 1941 and 1945. The school later named one of its Houses "Abbey" in memory of this period in their history.

=== School of the Annunciation ===
The School of the Annunciation was a place of learning for adults and was a charitable company based in the grounds of Buckfast Abbey. It was founded in 2014 by Dr Petroc Willey, Dr Andrew Beards, and Dr Caroline Farey, who had left the Maryvale Institute, with the Abbot of Buckfast. It offered distance learning, part-time programmes, summer schools and short courses in theology, philosophy, catechetics, sacred beauty, liturgy and other associated subjects to support the New Evangelisation. The School closed in August 2019 due to a lack of funding.

== Music ==
The current Master of the Music is Matthew Searles.

=== Choirs ===
The present incarnation of the Abbey Choir was founded in 2009. The choir sings Solemn Mass and Vespers on Sundays, and Mass on Holy Days of Obligation during the week. The choir sings a broad liturgical repertoire, ranging from polyphonic music of the sixteenth century and Masses of the Viennese school, through to music of the French Romantic tradition and contemporary music by James MacMillian, Matthew Martin and Dom Sebastian Wolff OSB. In 2018 the choir sang Christmas Midnight Mass, which was televised live on BBC One. The choir gives several concert performances each year, and in 2024 this included the premiere of a new Mass for Corpus Christi composed by Martin Baker.

Alongside the Abbey Choir, there is also a line of trebles recruited from local schools. Established in 2018, the Abbey Choristers sing alongside lay clerks drawn from the Abbey Choir at the Conventual Mass on Thursdays and some Saturdays and Sundays during school term time. They also perform occasionally in local area and on an annual summer tour. In 2025, the Abbey Choristers embarked on their first ever foreign tour, a trip to Swabia in South-West Germany, to visit the homeland of Anscar Vonier, whose 150th birthday fell in this year.

=== Organ ===
The Abbey has an organ by the Italian organ builder, Fratelli Ruffati, the first to be constructed in the UK. The organ was installed in 2017 and given its inaugural recital in 2018. The instrument consists of a substantial Quire Organ (four divisions and pedal) located on both sides of the Quire and the upper triforium, and a Grand-Orgue in the West Gallery (two divisions and pedal). The two spatially-separated instruments can by played antiphonally or together from one or both of the two consoles in the church. The organ contains 5,537 pipes and features a striking Pontifical Trumpet en chamade, which protrudes horizontally from the West Gallery casework.

The organ by Ruffati replaced a previous Hele/Walker instrument, the basis of which was installed in 1922 and later added to in successive changes. Important changes to the stop list were made by Ralph Downes, who also rescaled and revoiced the existing pipework in the 1940s and 1950s.

=== Ad Fontes ===
Ad Fontes is a record label founded by Buckfast Abbey dedicated to presenting recordings of sacred music. As well as featuring the Abbey's own choirs and organists, the label collaborates with external soloists and choirs to produce recordings of music from the Catholic tradition, a notable example of this being The Choir of Westminster Cathedral.

=== Bells ===
The tower contains fifteen bells. There is a ring of twelve bells, with a tenor weighing 41 long hundredweight (with two extra semi tone bells) surrounding the 7.5 ton bourdon bell called Hosanna. In August 2018, the Abbey hosted the Millennium Bell Ringing Festival in celebration of its 1000th year since the foundation of the monastery.

The bells were cast in 1935 by John Taylor and Co. and were donated by a local benefactor, Sir Robert Harvey. They are hung in the traditional change ringing style, and have an Ellacombe chiming apparatus for single-handed ringing, though this is currently out of use.

== List of abbots ==
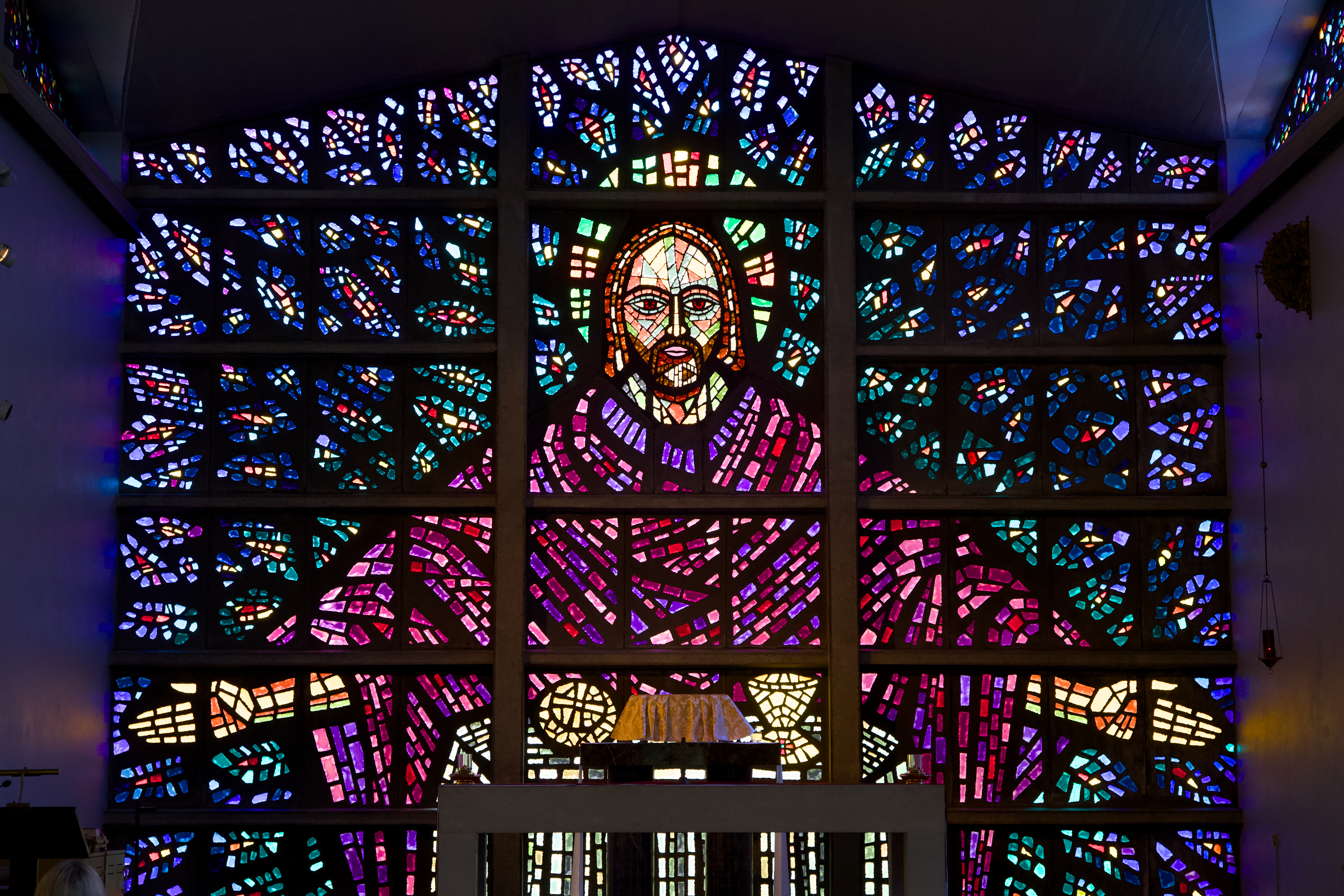
Stained glass in Buckfast Abbey: the panel, designed by the monks, is 8 metres (26 feet) across

=== Benedictine abbots ===
- Alwin (Aelwinus), first mentioned as having attended Shire-mote in Exeter in about 1040. Known from the Domesday Book of 1086 to have been Abbot in 1066.
- Eustace, first mentioned in 1143 in a Totnes Deed. He was Abbot when Buckfast was affiliated to the Abbey of Cîteaux (Cistercian).

=== Cistercian abbots ===
Buckfast still followed the Rule of St. Benedict, as the Cistercians also live by that Rule.

- William acted as Papal Legate in 1190.
- Nicholas elected in 1205.
- Michael mentioned in the Cartulary of Buckfast Abbey (C.B.A.) in 1223.
- Peter (I) mentioned in the C.B.A. 1242.
- William (II) mentioned in the C.B.A. 1249.
- Howell mentioned in the Leger Book (L.B.) of Buckfast (Brit. Mus.) – no dates.
- Henry mentioned in C.B.A. 1264 and 1269.
- Simon mentioned in C.B.A. and Petre Archives (P.A.) between 1273 and 1280.
- Robert mentioned in L.B. and Exeter Episcopal Registers (Ep. Reg.) between 1280 and 1283.
- Peter de Colepitte mentioned in the P.A. between 1291 and 1313
- Robert II mentioned in the Ep. Reg. 1316.
- William Atte Slade mentioned in the Banco Rolls 1327.
- Stephen I mentioned in the Ep. Reg. 1328.
- John of Churchstowe mentioned in the Ep. Reg. 1332.
- William Gifford mentioned in the Ep. Reg. 1333.
- Stephen of Cornwall mentioned in the Ep. Reg. 1348.
- Philip (Beaumont) mentioned in the Ep. Reg. 1349.
- Robert Symons mentioned in the Ep. Reg. and P.A. between 1355 and 1390.
- William Paderstow mentioned in the Ep. Reg and P.A. 1395.
- William Slade mentioned in the Ep. Reg 1401 and 1415.
- William Beaghe mentioned in the Ep. Reg. and P.A. between 1415 and 1432.
- Thomas Roger mentioned in Ep. Reg. and P.A. He was Prior Administrator c. 1422 – 1432, and blessed as Abbot in 1432.
- John Ffytchett mentioned in the Ep. Reg. 1440.
- John Matthu (Matthew) mentioned in the Ep. Reg. 1449.
- John King mentioned in the Statuta Cap. Gen. Ord. Cist. from 1464 to 1498.
- John Rede (I) mentioned in the Ep. Reg. 1498.
- John Bleworthy mentioned in 1505 – Cal. of Early Chancery Proceedings, also in Powderham MSS.
- Alfred Gyll mentioned in the Ep. Reg. 1512.
- John Rede (II) mentioned in the Ep. Reg. 1525. There is no record of death or resignation from his office.
- Gabriel Donne (died 1558) (alias Dunne), who was appointed by the Bishop of Exeter with the encouragement of Thomas Cromwell in 1535. He surrendered the Abbey to the king on 25 February 1539.

=== Benedictine abbots ===
Monastic life was restored at Buckfast in 1882; it became an abbey, under the direction of an abbot, in 1902.

- Very Rev Dom Thomas Duperou – Superior: 1882 – 1884 (became Abbot of Sacred Heart, USA)
- Very Rev Dom Leander Lemoine – Superior: 1884 – 1885
- Very Rev Dom Benedict Gariador – Prior: August 1885 – February 1899
- Very Rev Dom Leander Lemoine – Superior: March 1899
- Very Rev Dom Ignatius Jean – Superior: April 1899 – March 1900 (not a Monk of Buckfast)
- Very Rev Dom Leander Lemoine – Superior: March 1900 – July 1902 (was also Abbot Visitor)
- Very Rev Dom Savinian Louismet – Superior: July 1902 – November 1902
- Right Rev Dom Boniface Natter – Abbot: elected 19 November 1902. Died 4 August 1906.
- Right Rev Dom Anscar Vonier – Elected 14 September 1906. Died 26 December 1938.
- Right Rev Dom Bruno Fehrenbacher elected 10 January 1939. Resigned 1956. Titular Abbot of Tavistock till his death on 18 July 1965.
- Right Rev Dom Placid Hooper elected 5 January 1957. Ruling Abbot till 1976. Titular Abbot of Tavistock till his death on 11 December 1995
- Right Rev Dom Leo Smith elected 30 January 1976. Ruling Abbot till 1992. Titular Abbot of Colchester till his death on 10 July 1998
- Right Rev Dom David Charlesworth elected 3 January 1992. Ruling Abbot till 1999. Titular Abbot of Malmesbury.
- Very Rev Dom Sebastian Wolff appointed Prior Administrator in January 2000
- Right Rev Dom William Philip Manahan elected Abbot 10 December 2003. Resigned December 2006 and was convicted and imprisoned for child sex abuse.
- Right Rev Dom Richard Yeo appointed Abbot Administrator February 2007 until January 2009
- Right Rev Dom David Charlesworth re-elected Abbot 27 January 2009. January 2018 appointed Abbot Administrator after the community failed to elect an Abbot.
- Very Rev Dom Gavin Francis Straw appointed Prior Administrator March 2019.
- Right Rev Dom David Charlesworth re-elected Abbot 9 April 2021.

== Gallery ==
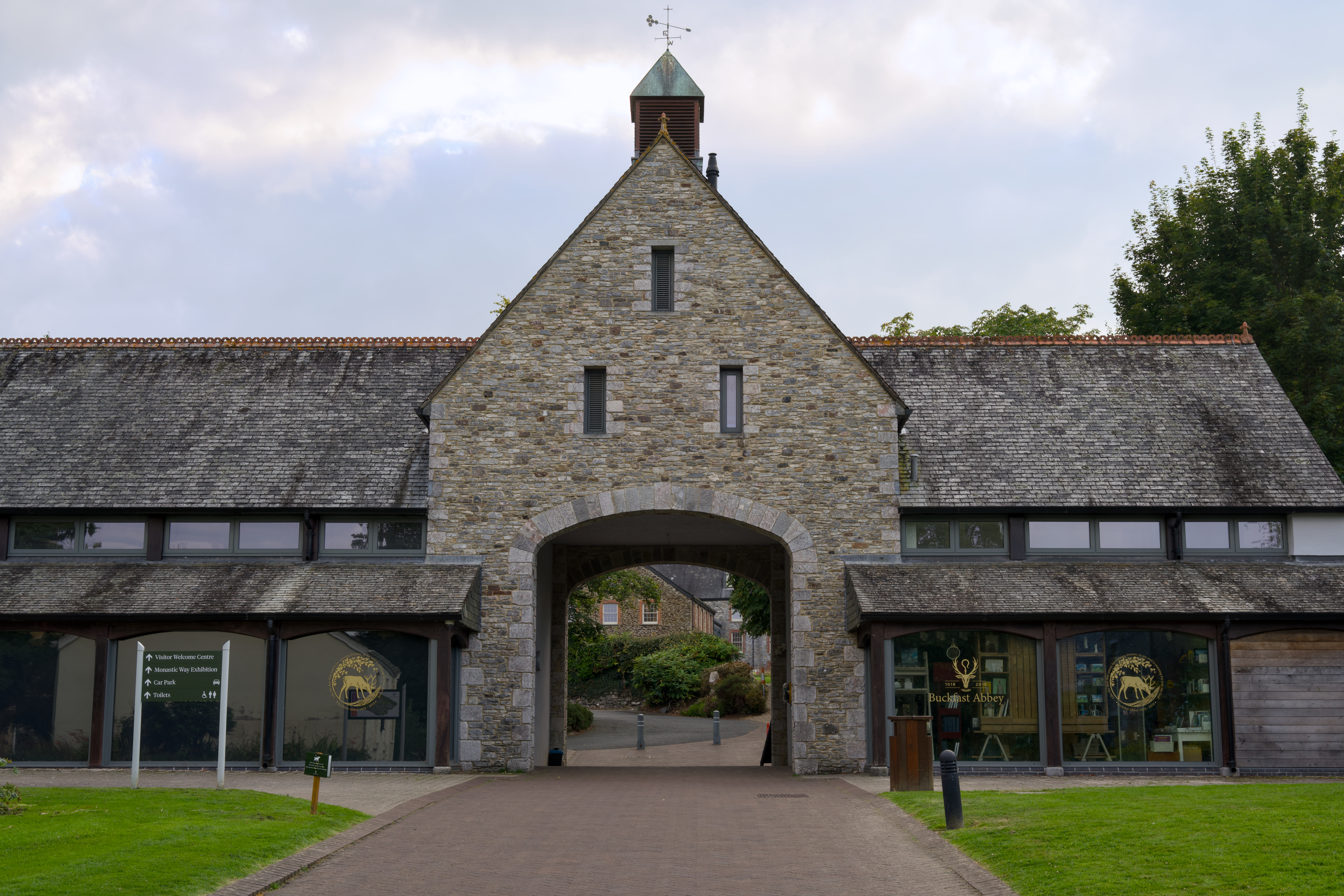
Gatehouse and Visitor Welcome Centre

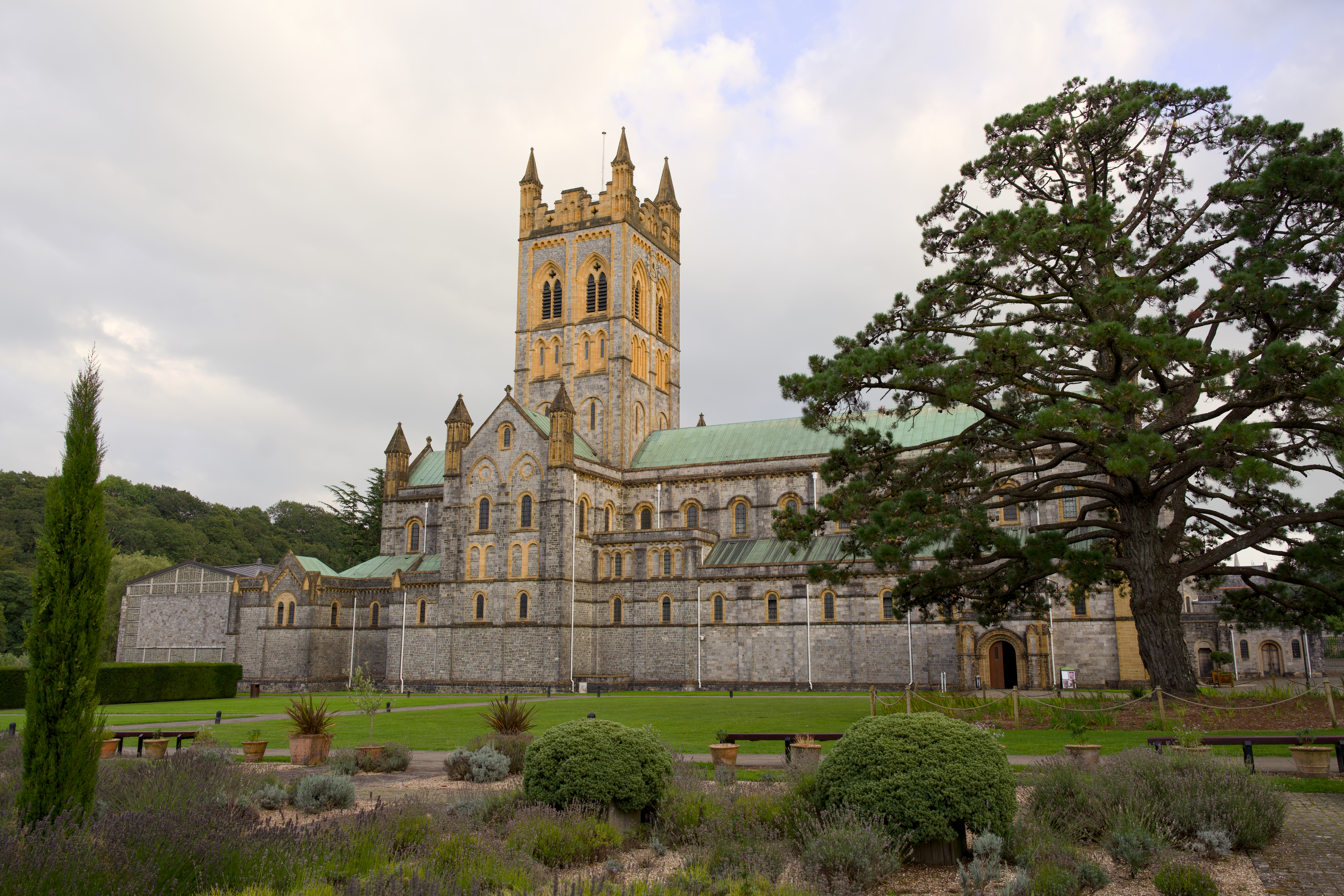
Abbey Church

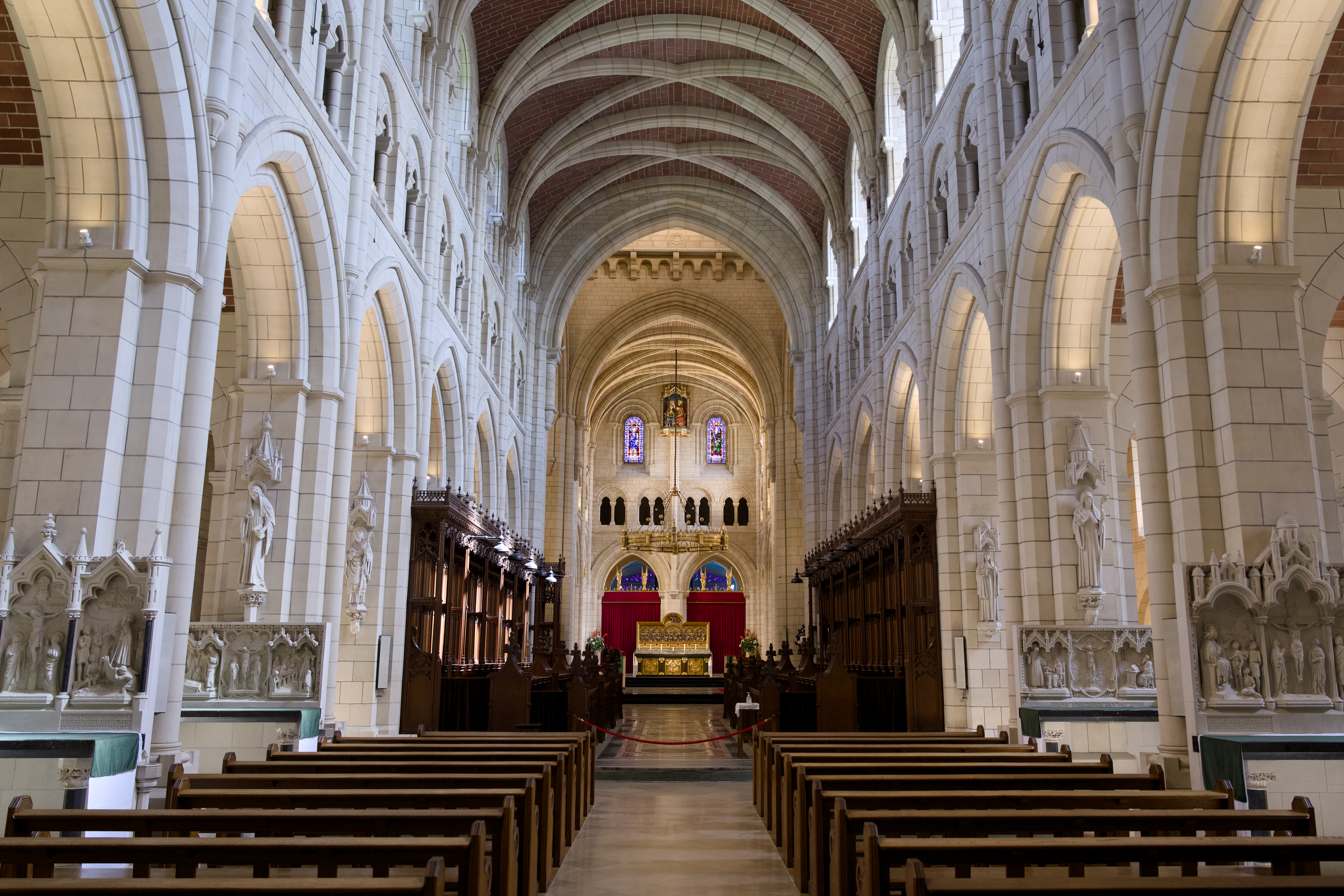
Interior of the Abbey Church

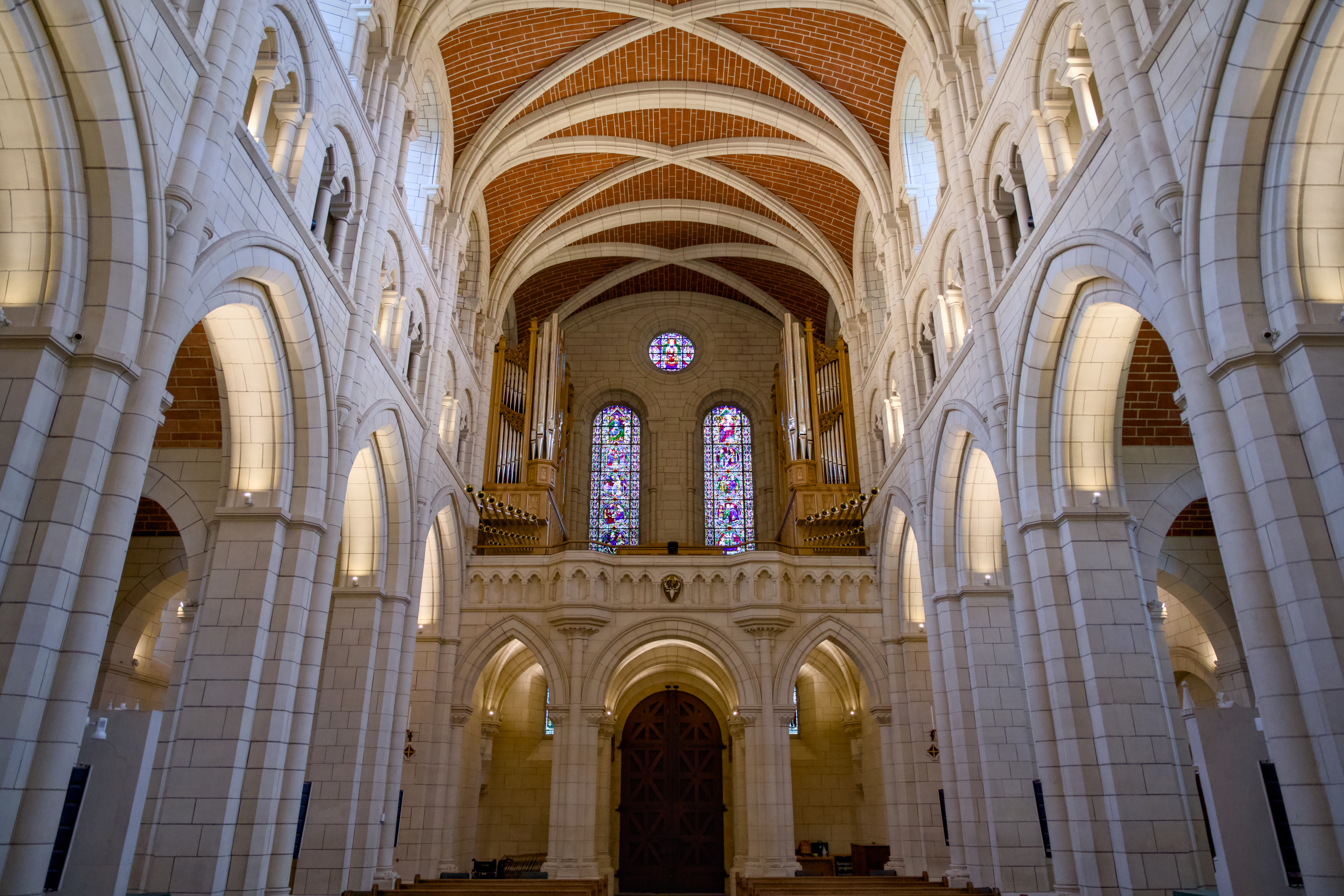
Nave and West Gallery

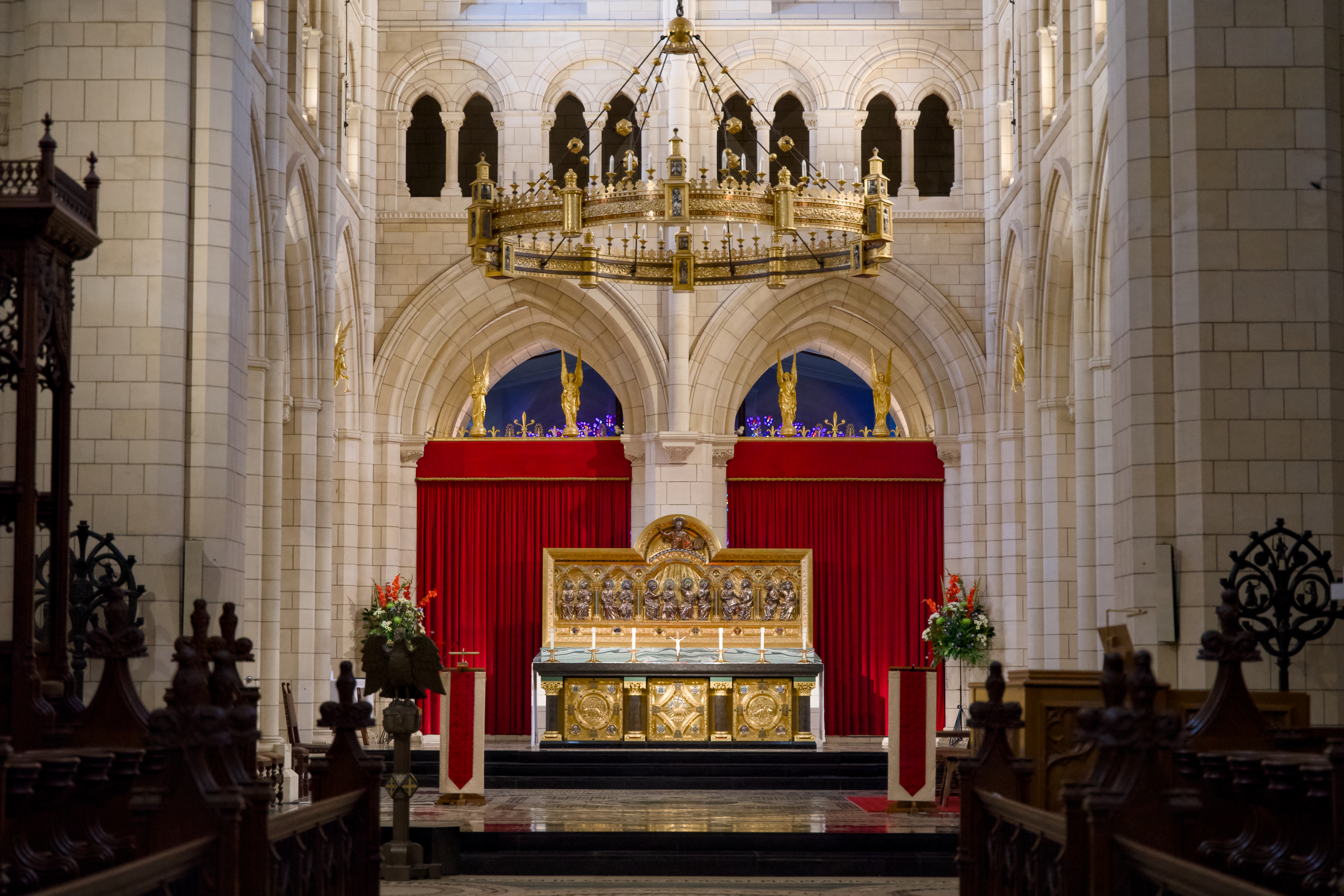
Main Altar

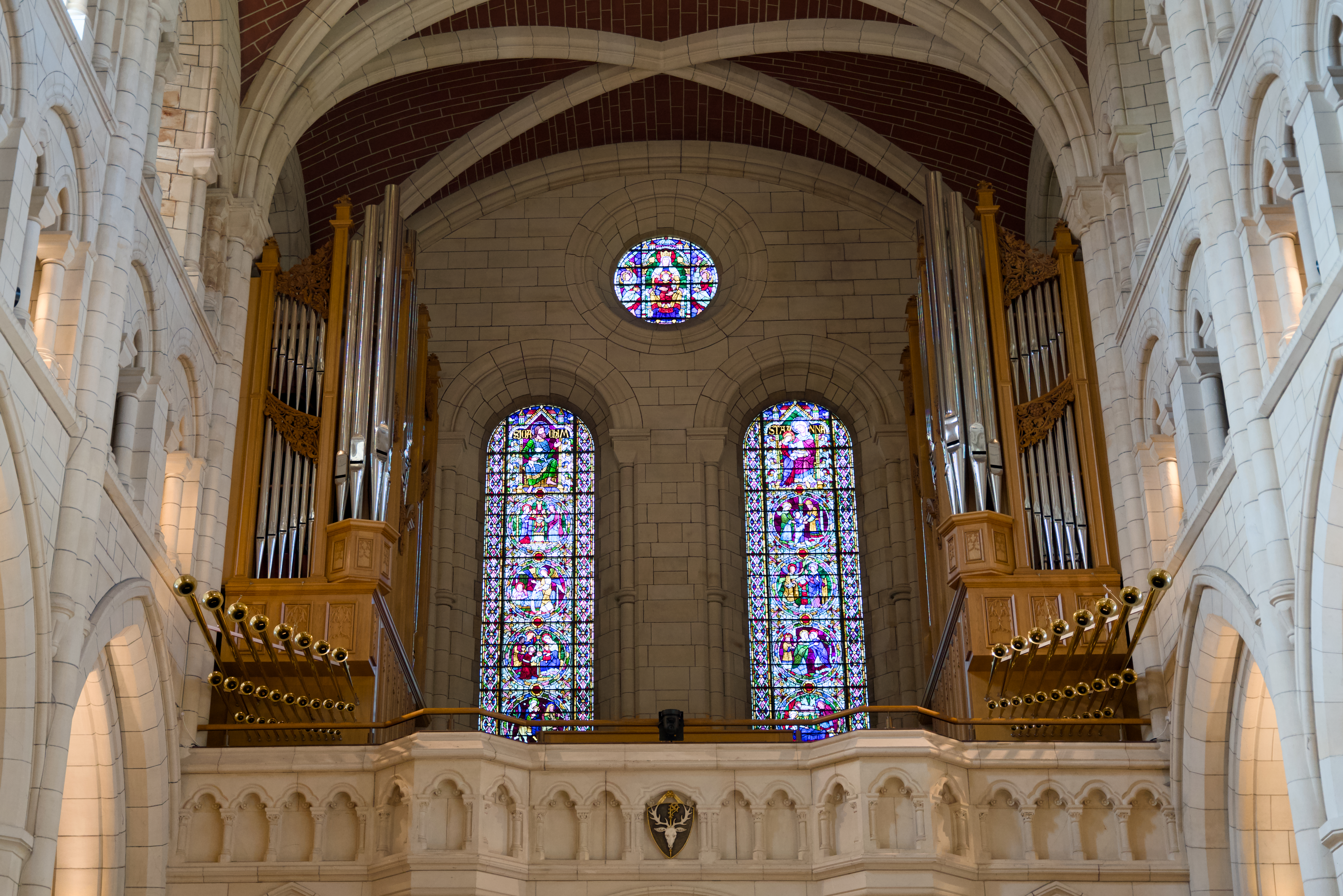
Ruffatti Organ

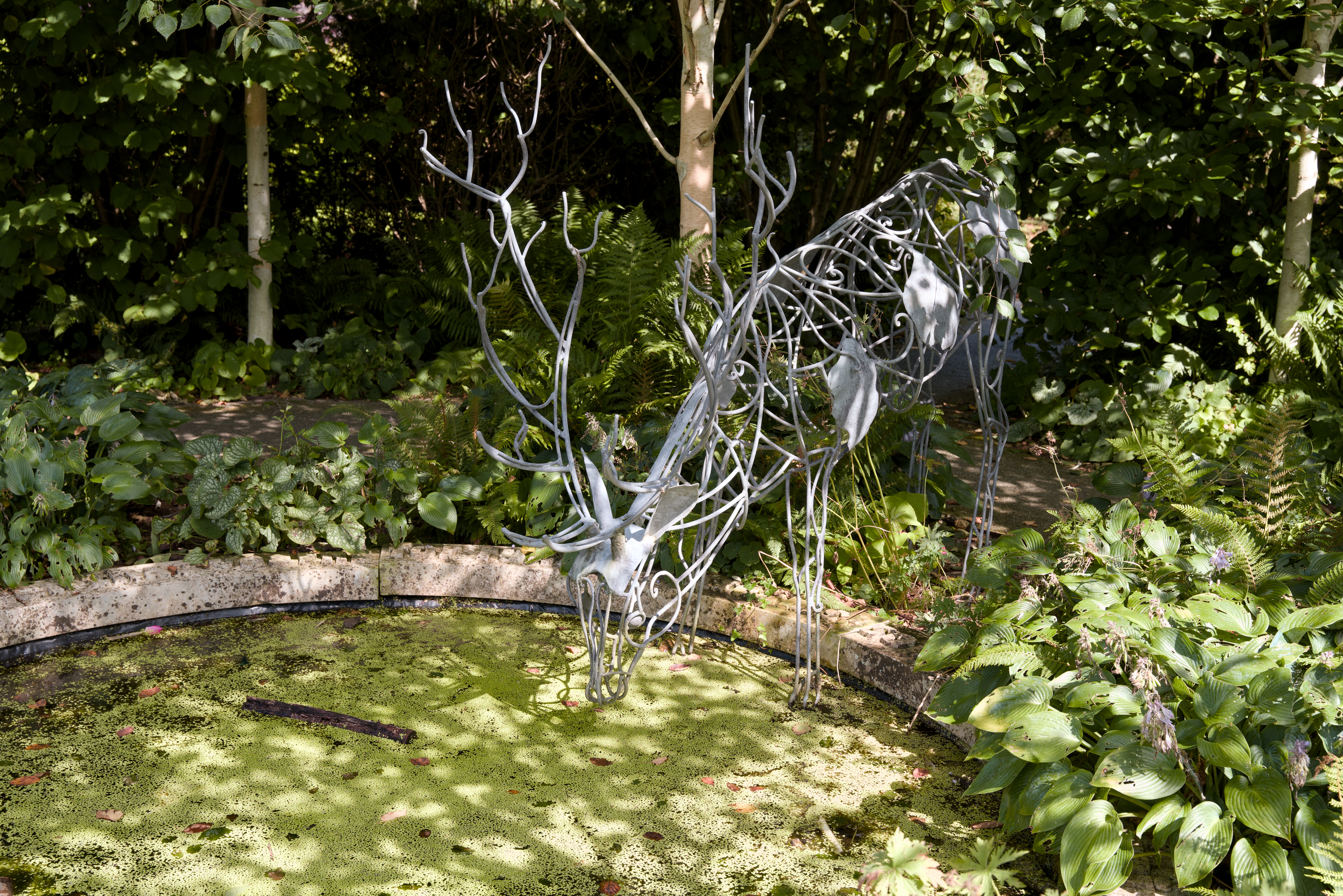
Millennium Garden

== See also ==
- Charles Norris (artist)
- Buckfastleigh
- St Boniface's Catholic College
- Dartmoor crosses
- English Benedictine Congregation
- List of monastic houses in Devon
- List of monastic houses in England

== General sources ==
- Beattie, Gordon (1997). Gregory's Angels: A History of the Abbeys, Priories, Parishes and Schools of the Monks and Nuns Following the Rule of Saint Benedict in Great Britain, Ireland and Their Overseas Foundations : to Commemorate the Arrival of Saint Augustine in Kent in 597 AD. Gracewing Publishing. ISBN 9780852443866.
- Clutterbuck, Robin Buckfast Abbey – A History ISBN 0-9511806-1-4
- Heald, Claire "Binge drinking — the Benedictine connection", BBC News, 26 September 2006, retrieved 8 October 2006.
- St Boniface's Catholic College Historical Archives – 1951
