= SS Sirio =

Italian passenger steamer

Coordinates: 37°39′6.73″N 0°39′10.31″W

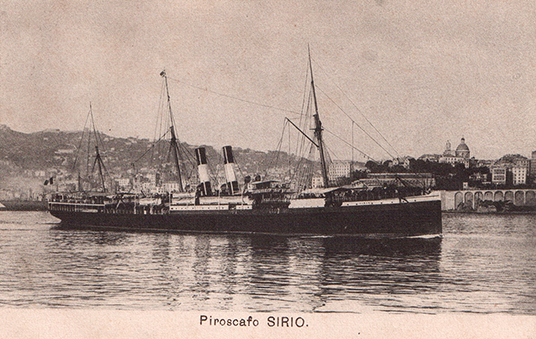
- A postcard depicting Sirio

History
- Name: SS Sirio
- Owner: Società Italiana di Trasporti Maritimi Raggio & Co (1883-1885); Navigazione Generale Italiana (1885-1906)
- Builder: Robert Napier and Sons, Glasgow
- Launched: 24 March 1884
- Christened: 24 March 1884, by Lizzie Hamilton
- Fate: Foundered after colliding with a rock, 4 August 1906

General characteristics
- Tonnage: 4,141
- Length: 380 feet (120 m)
- Beam: 42 feet (13 m)
- Draft: 33 feet 6 inches (10.21 m)
- Installed power: Four double-ended steel boilers, one three-cylinder compound engine
- Speed: 14.87 knots (27.54 km/h) maximum
- Capacity: 120 first class, 120 second class, 1,200 steerage

SS Sirio was an Italian passenger steamer that was wrecked off the eastern Spanish coast on 4 August 1906, causing the deaths of at least two hundred Italian and Spanish emigrants bound for Brazil, Uruguay, and Argentina. The wreck had a profound effect on communities in northern Italy and was remembered in popular songs of the era. It was the second worst peacetime maritime disaster in Italian history, only surpassed by the sinking of the Principessa Mafalda nineteen years later.

== Early history ==
Sirio was a 4,141-GRT passenger steamer built in 1883 by Robert Napier and Sons of Glasgow for Società Italiana di Trasporti Maritimi Raggio & Co. of Genoa. She was launched on 26 March 1883 and completed in June of the same year; she had two sister ships, Orione and Perseo. She was 115.81 meters long and 12.83 meters wide and was originally propelled by a 850 HP steam engine that allowed a top speed of fourteen knots; she could carry 1,440 passengers, of whom 120 in first class, 120 in second class and 1,200 in third class.

Sirio made her maiden voyage on the Genoa-Las Palmas-Montevideo-Buenos Aires line on 15 July 1883. In March 1885 she was chartered by Navigazione Generale Italiana of Genoa, which then bought her in September of the same year, along with her two sisters. In 1887 she was briefly requisitioned as a troopship during the Eritrean War.

In 1891 Sirio was modernized in Genoa and had her engine replaced by a more powerful Ansaldo steam engine of 5,012 horsepower, which increased her top speed to fifteen knots. She spent her entire life on the route between Italy and South America.

== Final voyage ==
Sirio sailed from Genoa on 2 August 1906 under the command of captain Giuseppe Piccone, bound for Buenos Aires via Barcelona, Cádiz, Las Palmas, Cape Verde, Rio de Janeiro, Santos and Montevideo; at the departure from Genoa she carried a crew of 127 and 570 passengers, and a further 75 passengers joined the ship in Barcelona. Most of the passengers were emigrants.

Among the passengers were also number of Catholic prelates, including the Bishop of São Paulo, José de Camargo Barros, and the Archbishop of São Pedro, Cláudio José Gonçalves Ponce de Leão, as well as Boniface Natter, the first abbot of the rededicated Buckfast Abbey (a Benedictine abbey in England).

=== Wreck ===
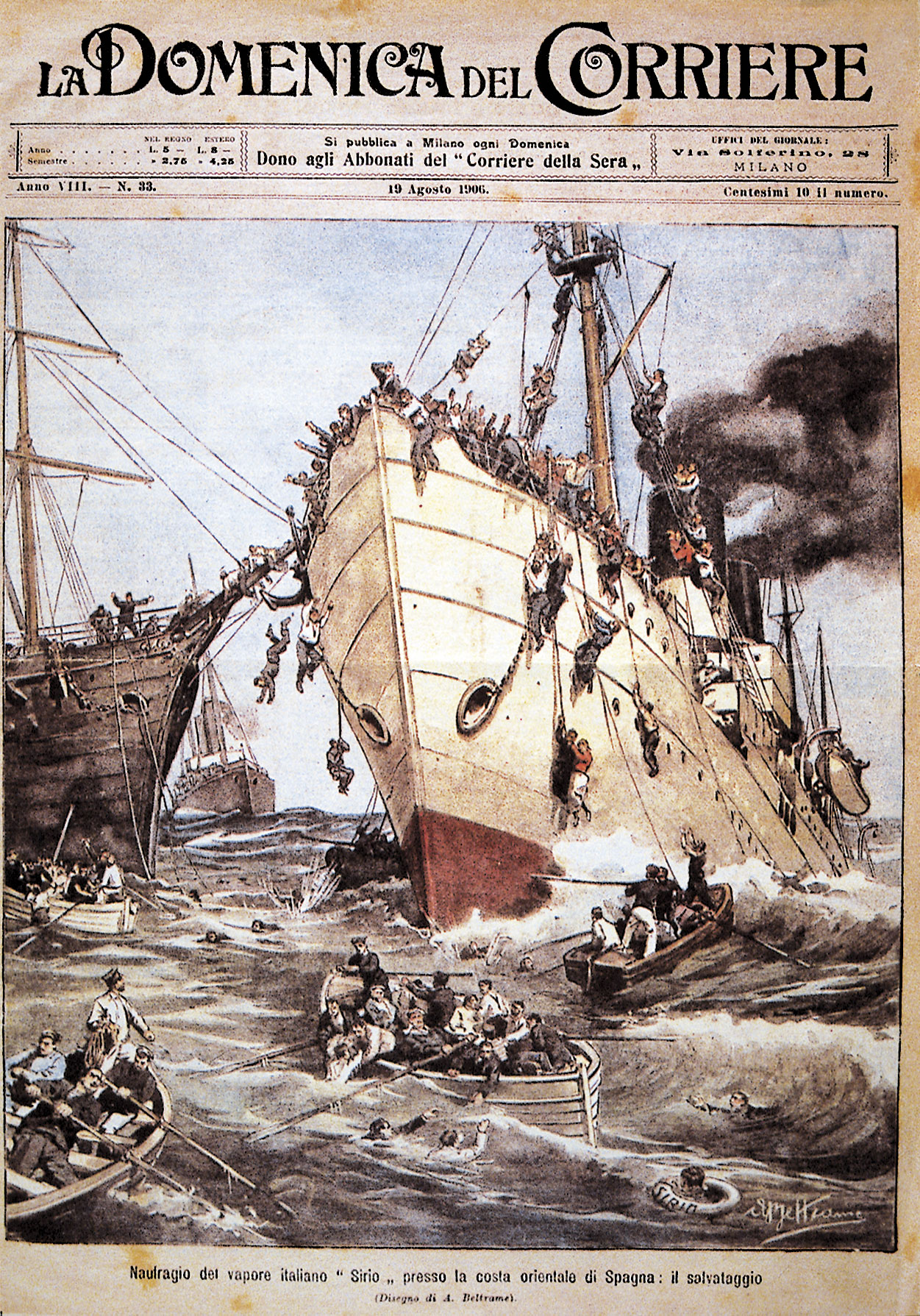
Domenica del Corriere cover about the Sirio disaster by Achille Beltrame

While passing off Cape Palos, Sirio followed a course that passed too close to the coast, and ran aground at full speed on the Punta Hormigas, a reef off Hormigas Island, two and a half miles east of Cape Palos, Cartagena, Spain. According to an eyewitness, the captain of the French steamer Marie Louise, she was "taking a dangerous course" when he saw her stop, her bow lifting. The boilers exploded, and "dead bodies began to float past the French steamer, and those on board could hear the shrieks of the drowning."

Many passengers were trapped in the lower decks, which were quickly flooded; a number of first class passengers were drowned soon after the grounding as their cabins were located in the stern, which was immediately submerged. Panic soon broke out onboard; some of the lifeboats had been damaged in the grounding, and several others were swarmed by the panicked passengers and swamped or capsized, resulting in the death of their occupants. Some passengers drowned while trying to swim ashore, whereas about twenty or thirty managed to swim to some rocks where they remained until next day, when they were rescued.

Only one lifeboat was successfully launched, with 29 passengers in it. The Marie Louise saved a further 25 people, while the bulk of the survivors were rescued by Spanish fishing vessels which soon raced to the scene; Joven Miguel, under the command of Vicente Buigues, came alongside Sirio and took off some three hundred people. A further two hundred survivors were rescued by the Vicente Llicano, and a few more by the Austro-Hungarian steamer Buda.

José de Camargo Barros "went down with the ship while blessing the drowning passengers", while Cláudio José Gonçalves Ponce de Leão survived. Boniface Natter drowned as well, whereas his fellow traveler Anscar Vonier survived and became the next abbot.

The captains of Joven Miguel and Vicente Llicano were singled out for their heroism. Some of the rescuers were also reported to have drowned while saving passengers. Survivors were brought ashore and put up in the local poorhouse and a circus building.

== Aftermath ==
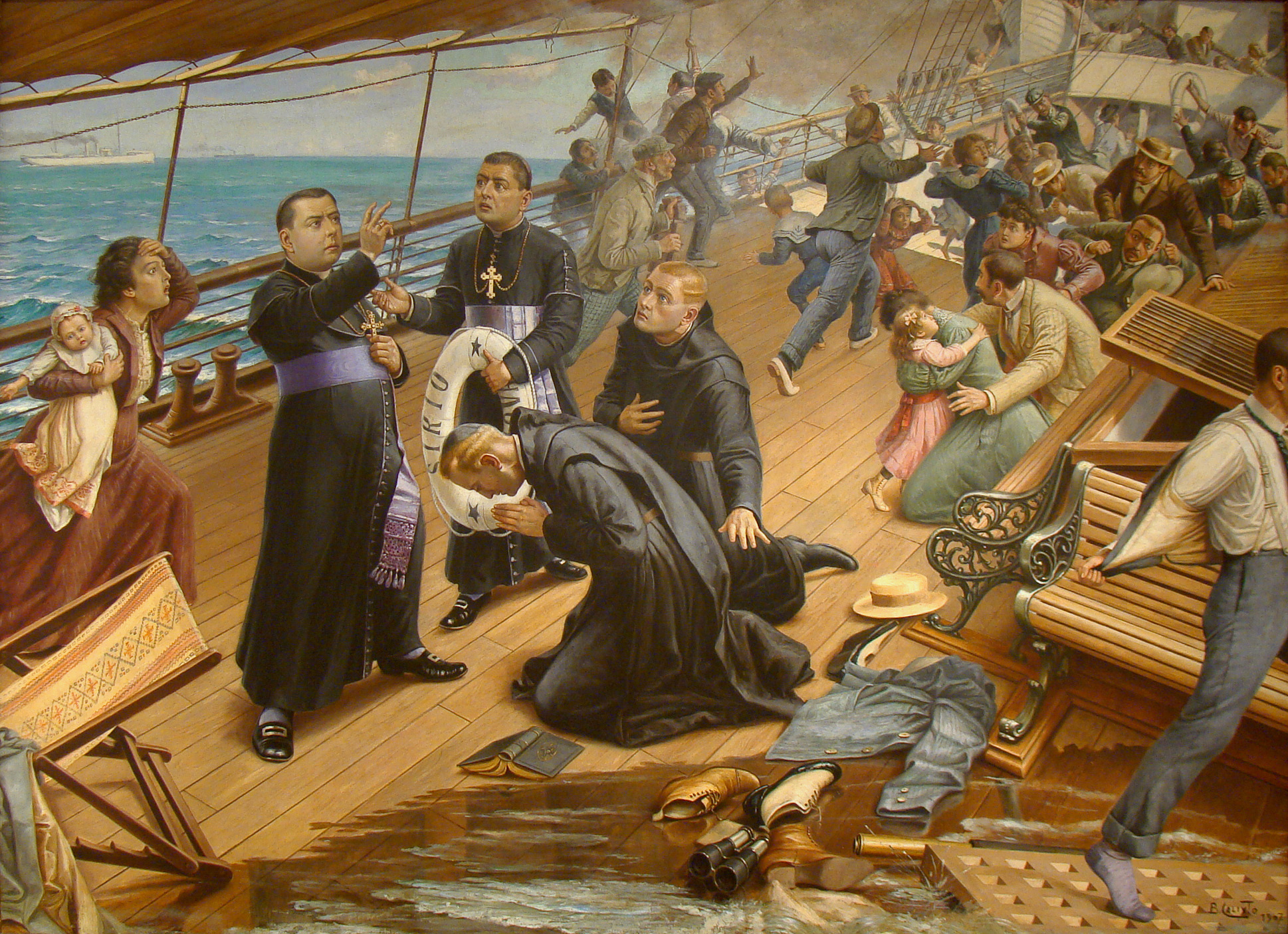
The sinking of the SS Sirio, by Benedito Calixto

The ship broke in two and sank completely after being grounded for nine days, and "dozens of decomposing corpses were released in the turbulence" including "the body of a very young girl still clutching her toy bucket." While initial reports claimed three hundred had died, improper passenger lists made it difficult to determine the exact number, although some reports estimated that as many as four hundred died. The final death toll was put by authorities at 293 victims, but claims persisted about many unregistered stowaways having died as well, with claims of up to five hundred overall deaths.

== Investigation of the captain's behavior ==
Newspaper reports quickly accused the captain and his crew of improper behavior. Initial newspaper reports claimed that the captain had been among the first to abandon ship, causing a panic among the passengers, but the enquiry later established that Piccone and most of his officers and crew had remained onboard the ship and done their best to save lives (indeed, it was later noted that most of the crew survived as unlike the passengers, they had kept calm and remained on the still partially afloat ship instead of jumping overboard or rushing the lifeboats), with Piccone being the last to abandon ship, as was confirmed among others by the captain of the Austro-Hungarian steamer Buda which participated in the rescue. The reports about Piccone having jumped ship were likely originated by the fact that the third officer, Mr Baglio, was indeed among the first to abandon ship along with some of the crew, and was apparently mistaken for the captain by some of the surviving passengers.

One explanation for the ship's unusual course was given by the Spanish newspaper España Nueva: the ship was alleged to have sailed so close because it "engaged in the clandestine embarkation of Spanish emigrants along the coast," in exchange for "large sums of money." This alleged "illicit traffic" was offered as one explanation for the captain's behavior, which "left much to be desired", and has also been cited as a reason to consider the official death toll as unreliable.

62-year-old Captain Piccone died in Genoa less than a year after the disaster, reportedly of "grief" and "a broken heart". Incorrect reports circulated that he had committed suicide.

== Legacy ==
Among these shipwrecked ones the priests prayed to heaven,
And they gave them their last benediction.
Fathers and mothers, they kissed their dear children,
And then they sank beneath the waves of the sea.

— "Il Sirio" 9-12

The wreck of Sirio had a major impact on the victims' communities. The effect on the northern Italian communities from which the emigrants came was profound, and the wreck was remembered in a popular ballad, "Il Sirio", which sings of the Sirio that "sailed away for America, and to its misfortune," "convey[ing] the agony of frantic parents looking for children who had gone under the waves." Another ballad, "Mamma Mia, Dammi Cento Lire", possibly refers to Sirio as well—it tells the story of a young man who asks his mother for 100 lire so he can sail to America, but "out on the ocean wide, / The great ship sank beneath the tide." The Spanish poet Santiago Delgado published a memorial "legend" about the disaster in a collection of eight pieces about the Mar Menor, the lagoon just north of Hormigas Island.

== See also ==
- The captain goes down with the ship
- List of shipwrecks
