= Bruno Fehrenbacher =

- Born: 27 July 1895; Mengen
- Died: 18 July 1965 (aged 69); Buckfast
- Occupation: Abbot of Buckfast Abbey

Bruno Fehrenbacher was a German-British Benedictine monk and Abbot of Buckfast Abbey in Devon, England.

== Biography ==
Bruno Fehrenbacher, born (as Hermann Fehrenbacher) on 27 July 1895 in Mengen, Württemberg, was one of five children of a German Catholic family. At the grammar school in Mengen he came into contact with a Benedictine monk from Buckfast; at the age of 15, he – like numerous other young men from the south of Germany – became a member of the Buckfast Abbey community. At that time this community was looking for workers to help with the rebuilding of the abbey which had been in ruins for centuries. The then-Abbot Ansgar (Martin) Vonier and his predecessor Abbot Boniface Natter came from the same area of Württemberg.

In 1919 Fehrenbacher was ordained a priest. He then studied philosophy at the Benedictine college of St. Anselmo (Rome) where he obtained his doctorate in 1922. Back in Buckfast, he became a British citizen in 1935. Between 1937 and 1939, he taught Syriac clergy at the Benedictine seminary in Jerusalem and in Charfet. After the death of Abbot Vonier on 26 December 1938, Fehrenbacher was elected as his successor and so returned to Buckfast. Abbot Bruno was installed on 24 February 1939 by Dom Adrian Taylor, abbot of St Augustine's Abbey, Ramsgate; the abbatial blessing followed on 23 March 1939.

During the war, Buckfast did not suffer bomb damage and thus was able to provide a refuge for the staff and pupils of St Boniface's Catholic College, Plymouth. After the war Abbot Fehrenbacher succeeded in extending the monastery buildings considerably and in rebuilding and enlarging the organ. In 1956, he resigned from his position as abbot because of ill-health. He then served as assistant chaplain to the Benedictine nuns of Stanbrook near Worcester, and was titular abbot of Tavistock Abbey. In 1964, he returned to Buckfast. He died on 18 July 1965.
