= Glycerophosphate =

Glycerophosphate may refer to:

- Glycerol 1-phosphate
- Glycerol 2-phosphate (BGP)
- Glycerol 3-phosphate
