= David Charlesworth =

Abbot of Buckfast Abbey

The Right Reverend David Charlesworth OSB
- Abbot of Buckfast Abbey
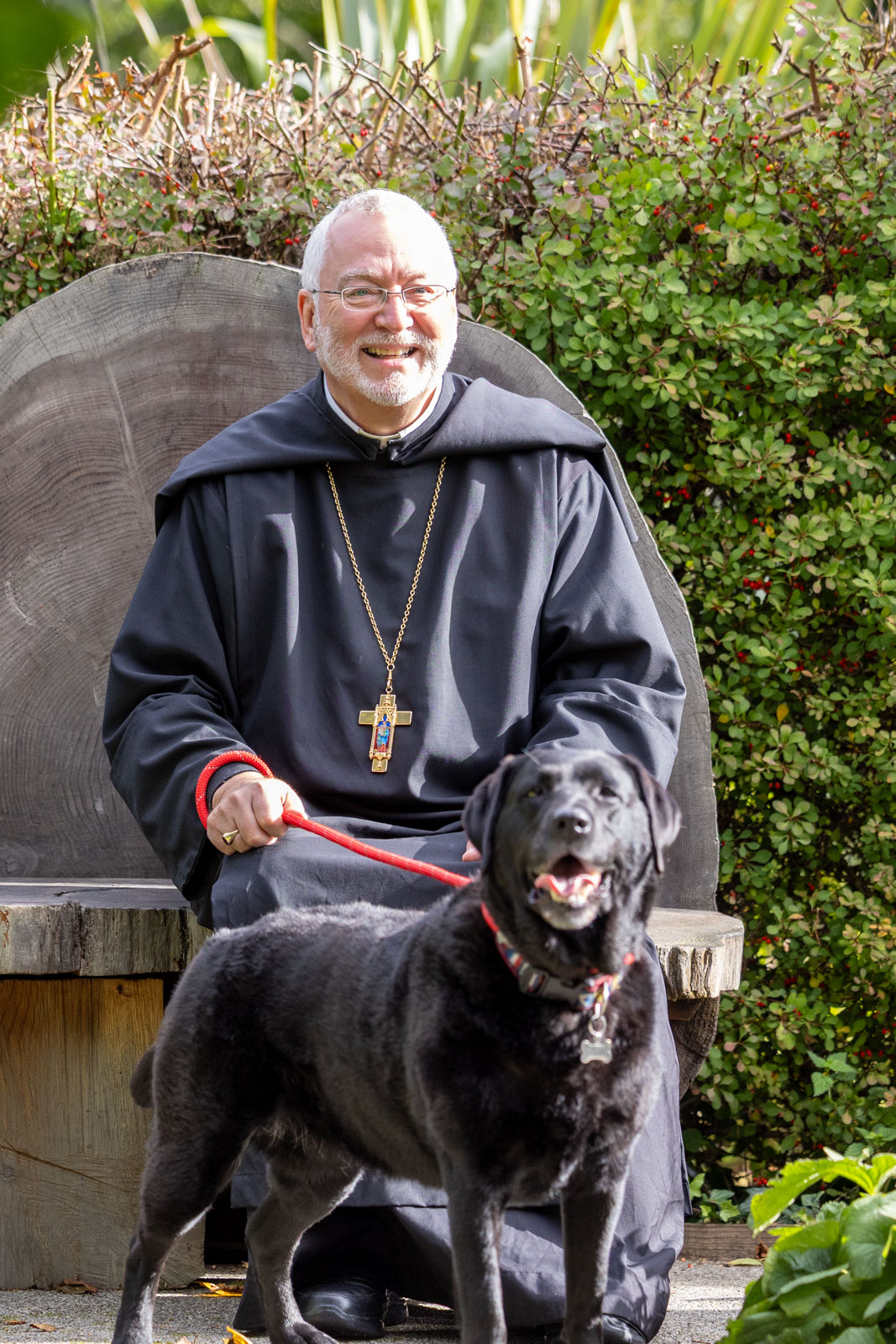
- Church: Catholic Church
- Elected: 9 April 2021
- Predecessor: Richard Yeo (Abbot Administrator)

Orders
- Ordination: 24 June 1984

Personal details
- Born: 6 October 1951 (age 75)
- Education: Newman College of Higher Education, St Benet's Hall, Oxford

David Charlesworth, OSB (born 6 October 1951) is the Abbot of Buckfast Abbey in Devon, England. A British Benedictine monk, he has been elected abbot three times. He has initiated significant restorations, educational expansions, liturgical renewals, and sustainability initiatives at the Abbey. Recognised for his open-minded approach, Charlesworth has fostered ecumenical dialogue, vocational formation, and environmental stewardship whilst embodying the Benedictine ethos of ora et labora (prayer and work). Buckfast Abbey attracts nearly 300,000 visitors annually, serving as a global hub for pilgrimage and general visitors.

== Biography ==
=== Early life and education ===
Following his formative education at St Brendan’s College, a school run by the Christian Brothers in Bristol, he was drawn to the monastic life. Aged 18 he entered Buckfast Abbey—an historic Benedictine monastery founded in 1018 and re-founded in the 19th century by French and German monks.

As a novice, he embraced the community’s rhythm of communal prayer, scriptural study, and manual labour, aligning with St. Benedict’s Rule. Buckfast’s history of resilience, surviving the Dissolution of the Monasteries as a house in private hands and then in 1882 its revival and rebuilding under Abbot Anscar Vonier, mirrored Charlesworth’s steadfast vocational call.

Charlesworth did not intend to enter the monastic priesthood and was sent to Newman College of Higher Education, Birmingham, to obtain a professional teaching qualification. Nevertheless, after 14 years he completed priestly studies at St Benet's Hall, Oxford, a Benedictine institution, equipping him for his later roles in pastoral and liturgical leadership. On 24 June 1984, he was ordained a priest in the Diocese of Plymouth, transitioning to sacramental ministry and engaging with post-Second Vatican Council liturgical reforms.

=== Monastic and pastoral roles ===
Before his abbacy, Charlesworth served as a teacher at Buckfast Abbey Prep School, an institution in the Abbey grounds, where he honed his skills as an educator and communicator during the 1970s and 1980s. During this time he was Housemaster, Mathematics and Science Master and Deputy Head.

In 1999, at the end of his first term as Abbot, he became chaplain to the Benedictine nuns of Oulton Abbey in Staffordshire, providing spiritual guidance to the community and the Care Home that was situated in their old school building. He later became chairman of the Oulton Abbey Trust, overseeing its governance and facilitating, through Buckfast Abbey’s resources, the construction of a new Care Home at Oulton to support the nuns’ mission of community care.

Following his second term as Abbot, Charlesworth served two years providing pastoral care at St James' Priory, Bristol, the oldest building in Bristol, known for its historic significance as a 12th century Benedictine foundation. After his re-election he has continued to visit the Priory fortnightly, offering pastoral provision to support its community, demonstrating his enduring dedication to grassroots ministry.

=== Abbatial elections and leadership ===
Elected Abbot of Buckfast on 3 January 1992 aged 40, Charlesworth served his first term until 1999, after which he held the title of Titular Abbot of Malmesbury Abbey.

During his first term, he oversaw expansions including a car park, gift shop, and Grange restaurant to ensure financial self-sufficiency, while revitalising gardens and apiaries in line with Benedictine ideals. He also managed the retirement of renowned beekeeper Brother Adam, ensuring the continuity of Buckfast’s involvement in bee keeping. He served as Chair of Governors at St Mary’s School, Buckfast for eight years, helping to shape its Benedictine ethos and furthering Buckfast’s educational mission.

Due to the changing landscape of private education in the South West the Abbey prep school was closed in 1994. The buildings have been converted into a successful Conference Centre and Education Activities facility.

He was re-elected on 27 January 2009 for a second term (until 2017). Charlesworth then served as Abbot Administrator (2017–2019), after which he held the title of Titular Abbot of Tewkesbury. Two years at St James Priory, Bristol followed until he was elected for a third term on 9 April 2021, reflecting the Monastic Community’s trust.

=== Key initiatives and achievements ===
Charlesworth’s abbacy is defined by initiatives blending tradition with modernity. In education, as the first Director, he expanded the Abbey’s Education Department (established 1985), which offers award-winning programmes on monastic history and spirituality, serving as a model for UK cathedrals.

His efforts earned him a 2013 Honorary Doctor of Education from Birmingham Newman University, where he studied as an alumnus. This was presented at Birmingham Symphony Hall and was awarded for his lifelong dedication to faith-based learning. In his third term, he founded the Buckfast Institute for Ecclesiastical Studies, a centre for theological and pastoral formation rooted in Benedictine scholarship.

Liturgically, Charlesworth established the Buckfast Abbey Choir in 2009, assembling semi-professional singers for weekly Solemn Masses and Sunday Vespers. Its repertoire, spanning polyphony to modern commissions (e.g., James MacMillan, Dom Sebastian Wolff), has earned acclaim through BBC broadcasts and recordings on the Ad Fontes label.

Meticulous planning for the Abbey’s Millennium year in 2018 ensured its success. Restoration projects under his guidance include the 2011–2014 church cleaning, new Purbeck stone flooring, and enhanced Cosmati paving, enhancing the abbey’s prayerful atmosphere. A new Ruffatti organ was commissioned; a permanent Monastic Exhibition was created; as well as a Millennial Garden and a new statue of Our Lady of Buckfast outside the Church. Joyful Millennial services took place throughout the year. A Papal Legate was appointed by Pope Francis to attend one of the special celebrations in the person of Cardinal Anders Arborelius.

Ecumenically, his tenure has facilitated interfaith events. The ordinations of three former Anglican bishops also took place in the Abbey Church. The relic of St. Thomas More’s hair shirt was made available for public veneration in 2016, through negotiations with the Diocese of Plymouth.

Hospitality has been a significant feature of the Abbey’s Benedictine ethos with the opening of Northgate hotel. Accommodation for visiting groups is provided in the Grangehurst building and male visitors can stay in the monastery for a week’s retreat.

In sustainability, Charlesworth approved the 2012 installation of an 84 kW Archimedes screw turbine on the River Dart—one of the UK’s largest—generating renewable energy for the abbey’s needs while exporting surplus to the National Grid, with fish-friendly designs minimising ecological impact. Rainwater harvesting, solar panels, and energy-efficient refurbishments in alignment with Pope Francis’s Laudato si’, reduce emissions for a site hosting nearly 300,000 visitors yearly. Careful conservation of the Abbey’s lands with the large scale planting of trees and the rebuilding of the Salmon fish pass in 2021 and upgrading of the eel pass emphasise the connection of the spiritual and the worldly through the river.

=== Influence, homilies, and legacy ===
Charlesworth’s eloquent homilies, shared via abbey newsletters, podcasts (e.g., with the Lay Community of St. Benedict), and broadcasts and Abbey website, interweave scripture with practical wisdom, inspiring ethical living and prayer.

In a 2017 interview, he noted humanity’s draw to monastic stability: "Human beings like the idea of a thousand years of continuity."
