= Abbey of la Pierre-qui-Vire =

Benedictine monastery in Yonne, France

Coordinates: 47.358°N 4.063°E

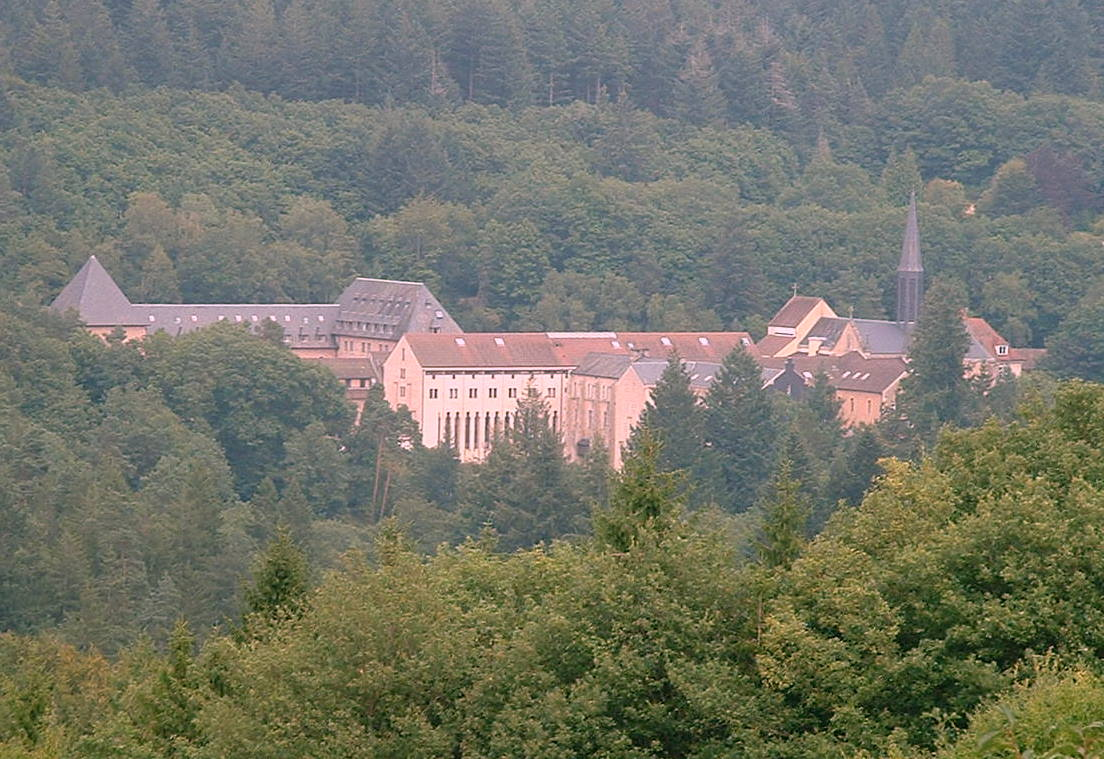
The abbey in 2009

The Abbey of la Pierre-qui-Vire (French: Abbaye de la Pierre-qui-Vire; Abbaye de de Sainte-Marie de la Pierre-qui-Vire), in the commune of Saint-Léger-Vauban, in the forests of the Morvan, France, is a Benedictine monastery founded in 1850.

The abbey is named after a large rocking stone ("pierre qui vire"), which at the outset could be moved by a human hand, but which since 1853 has been fixed in place and is surmounted by a statue of the Virgin Mary.

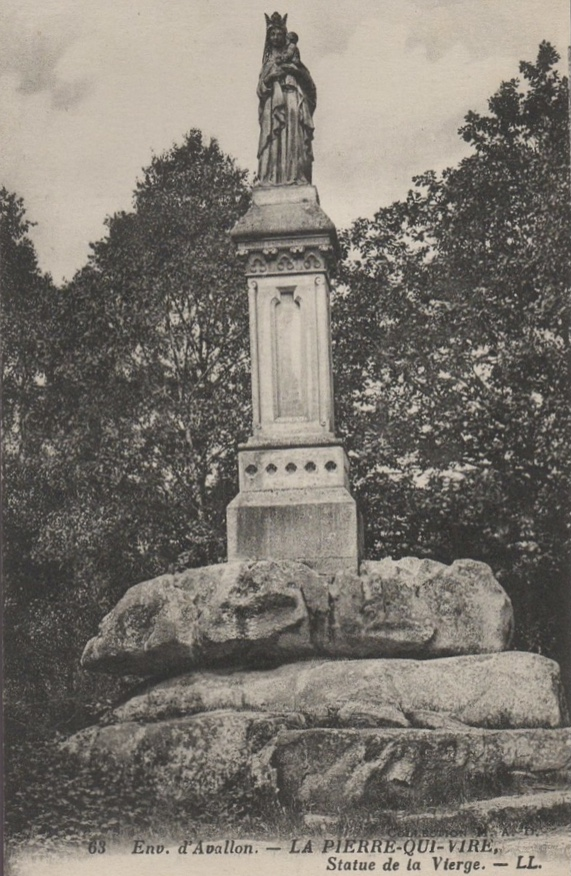
The former rocking stone, now with a statue of Mary

The congregation was founded by Father Jean-Baptiste Muard, a priest drawn to the Rule of Saint Benedict during a visit to Subiaco in Italy. In 1848 he completed his monastic novitiate at the Trappist monastery of Aiguebelle. On 3 October 1850 he established the community on a six-hectare estate donated by the Chastellux family. The monastery is in a woodland area, on the banks of the Trinquelin stream, running through granite rocks.

Muard died in 1854. By 1857, the community contained about twenty brothers, and was growing fast, so began to build the present large abbey. In 1859, the monks joined the Subiaco Congregation of the Benedictine order.

Anti-clerical legislation in France forced the monks into exile in 1880 and again in 1904. Some of these monks re-founded and rebuilt Buckfast Abbey in Devon, England. The monastic community was not re-established at its home until 1921. Today, the monks there are best known for making cheeses from goat's or cow's milk, which are eaten throughout the region.

The abbey is well known for publishing books in the Éditions Zodiaque, an imprint founded in 1951 and specializing in Romanesque art. The volumes were printed at the abbey until 2002.

== Abbots ==
- 1850–1854: Marie-Jean-Baptiste Muard
- 1854–1884: Bernard Moreau
- 1884–1904: Étienne Denis
- 1904–1925: Léandre Lemoine
- 1925–1948: Fulbert Gloriès
- 1948–1952: Placide de Roton
- 1952–1978: Denis Huerre
- 1978–2002: Damase Duvillier
- 2002– : Luc Cornuau
