= Boniface Natter =

Boniface Natter (24 April 1866 – 4 August 1906), christened Anthony, was a German Benedictine Monk who became the first Abbot of the newly reformed Benedictine Abbey of Buckfast in Devon, England.

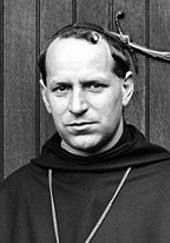
Abbot Boniface Natter

== Biography ==
Boniface was born Anton Natter in Swabia, a province of the Kingdom of Württemberg . Boniface had been clothed as a novice at Buckfast in November 1882 and took his simple vows in November 1883. He was ordained as Priest by Bishop William Vaughan of Plymouth in 1890.

Because at that time there were no monasteries in Swabia, Boniface made periodic trips to that province to recruit novices for the Buckfast community.

His solemn Blessing as Abbot of the restored Abbey took place at Buckfast on 24 February 1903. This date marked the anniversary of the Dissolution of the Abbey in 1539.

At the solemn Blessing a telegram sent by the Pope was read in which his blessing was conveyed upon the new Abbot and all present at the ceremony.

The new Abbot's first major task was to begin the works of restoring Buckfast Abbey. The Abbey had been dissolved in 1539 and at the restoration of the Community in 1882 only the foundations of the medieval Abbey remained. Dr Macnamara of Torquay presented the Abbot with a donation of £1000 to begin the rebuilding and work began on the West front of the Abbey.

Boniface was also responsible for the restoration of the statue of Our Lady of Buckfast, which had been damaged at the time of the Reformation. This ancient statue, recovered by the Community, still retained some fragments of colour and gilding. The statue was blessed in the temporary church at Buckfast on 24 May 1903.

In May 1906, with the restoration of the Abbey foundation underway, Natter was elected as Abbot Visitor of the French Province. Abbot Boniface was a passenger with his brother monk, Anscar Vonier aboard the steamship SS Sirio sailing from Genoa, Italy to Brazil. On 4 August 1906 the steamship struck a reef off of the Hormigas Islands near the Spanish coast of Cartagena and over 400 people died, including Natter.

When news of the sinking reached the Community at Buckfast it was believed that both Abbot and Vonier had perished and Requiem Masses were said for the repose of their souls. However, Vonier survived. Vonier on 14 September 1906 was elected by the Community to succeed Boniface as the second Abbot of Buckfast.

Boniface Natter's body was never recovered. There is a memorial to the Abbot within the Abbey Cemetery at Buckfast with a Latin inscription which reads as follows:

In Memoriam Rmi. D. BONIFACII NATTER ABBATIS INSTAURATAE ABBATIAE PRAESULIS PRIMI APUD LITTUS HISPANICUM NAUFRAGUS 4 AUG. 1906 In alto quiescit donec Mare reddat mortuos. Absorpta est mors in Victoria. (Ex dono sororis Anscarius Abbas posuit)

A photograph of Natter is in the collection of the British National Archives at Kew.
