= Becky Sharp (disambiguation) =

Becky Sharp is the main protagonist of William Makepeace Thackeray's novel Vanity Fair.

Becky Sharp may also refer to:

- Becky Sharp (film) a 1935 American historical drama film, based on the novel
- Becky Sharp (play), an 1899 play by Langdon Elwyn Mitchell, based on the novel
- Becky Sharp, unrelated character from Kitchen Confidential (TV series)

== See also ==
- Becky Sharpe, alter ego of Hazard, a DC Comics character
