= Zeckwer =

Zeckwer is a surname. Notable people with the surname include:

- Richard Zeckwer (1850–1922), American composer and music teacher
- Camille Zeckwer (1875–1924), American composer, son of Richard
