= Hugh Wynne =

1897 novel by Silas Weir Mitchell

Hugh Wynne was a popular American novel by Silas Weir Mitchell, who was also a medical doctor, published in 1897. The story is recounted in autobiographical form from the perspective of an American patriot during the American Revolution who has a strict father. He eventually serves under General George Washington and has various adventures as well as a love interest playing out during the Revolutionary War era. The Bookman reported it to be the secondmost-bestselling book in America for 1898.

Much of the book takes place in Philadelphia. The Bookman gave the book high praise.

The book was first serialized in The Century from November 1896 through October 1897.

The full title of the book is Hugh Wynne, Free Quaker, Sometime Brevet Lieutenant-Colonel on the Staff of His Excellency General Washington.

Richard J. Beamish used the novel as the basis for his libretto to Camille Zeckwer's cantata La Mischianza.

== See also ==
- Publishers Weekly list of bestselling novels in the United States in the 1890s
