= Pauline Gilmour Hatch =

American composer and hymnwriter

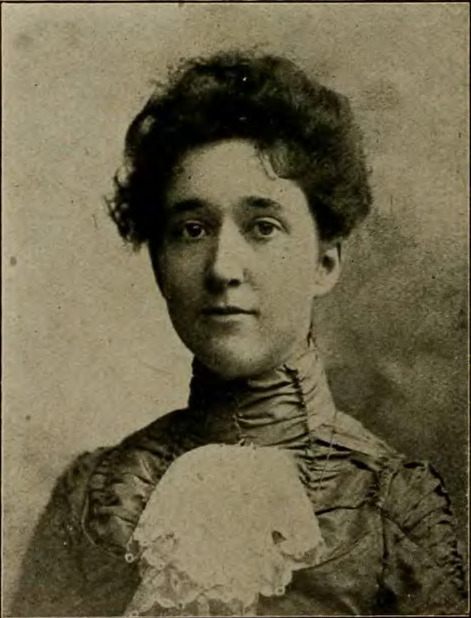
Mrs. Pauline Gilmour Hatch (photographic portrait, before 1904)

Pauline Gilmour Hatch (née Gilmour; 1871–1955) was an American composer and hymnwriter.

== Life ==
Pauline Gilmour Hatch was the only daughter of Henry Lake Gilmour, a dentist and Methodist hymnwriter, editor, and choir director. She was born at either Cape May, or Wenonah, New Jersey, on April 3, 1871. She manifested a great love for music at an early age, which was encouraged and cultivated in a musical atmosphere, William J. Kirkpatrick being her first instrumental teacher. Later she received a diploma from the South Jersey Institute, Bridgeton, New Jersey, and also took a course at Richard Zeckwer's Conservatory of Music in Philadelphia. An organist, she sometimes accompanied her father who often sang at Christian meetings.

She married H. Morgan Hatch, of Delair, New Jersey, on October 30, 1903. Hatch was a member of a family of early Camden settlers. He worked as a Pennsauken tax collector, director of Merchantville National Bank and Trust Co. and proprietor of the former N. J. Auto and Supply Co. He died in 1952. They had one son, Paul, who died in 1943.

Pauline lived for many years at Pennsauken. She died at her home, 6900 River Rd., Pennsauken, on Wednesday, November 9, 1955, aged eighty-four, and was buried in Arlington Cemetery, Pennsauken.

== Music ==
According to Anthony Johnson Showalter, among her best and most popular compositions are "Volunteers, to the Front", "Our Dearly Loved Banner", "Jesus, Refuge of My Soul" and "Peace Hymn of Nations", "all of which show talent of a high order, coupled with thorough scholarship". Her compositions were published in numerous hymnals.

== Sources ==
- Showalter, A. J. (1904). The Best Gospel Songs and Their Composers. Dalton, GA: The A. J. Showalter Co.; Dallas, TX: The Showalter-Patton Co. p. 276.
- "Obituaries: Mrs. Pauline G. Hatch". Courier-Post. Camden, New Jersey. Thursday, November 10, 1955. p. 4.
- "Pauline Gilmour Hatch". Hymnary.org. Accessed July 12, 2022.
- "Pauline Gilmour Hatch". Hymntime.com. Accessed July 12, 2022.
