= Langdon Elwyn Mitchell =

American dramatist

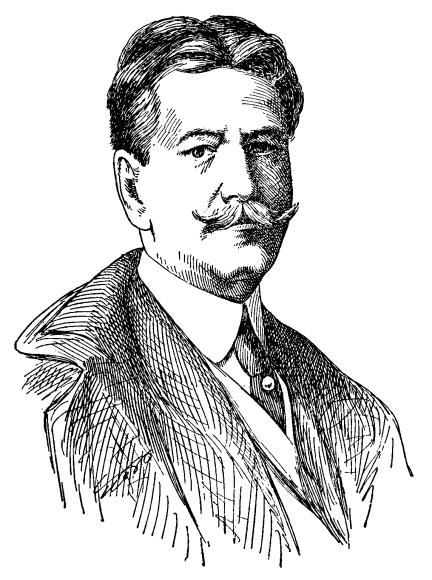
- Born: February 17, 1862; Philadelphia, [ Pennsylvania, U.S.
- Died: October 21, 1935 (aged 73); Hospital of the University of Pennsylvania, Philadelphia, Pennsylvania, U.S.
- Education: Harvard University; Columbia Law School
- Parent(s): S. Weir Mitchell; Mary Middleton Elwyn
- Relatives: John Kearsley Mitchell (grandfather)

Langdon Elwyn Mitchell (February 17, 1862 – October 21, 1935) was an American playwright who was popular on Broadway during the early twentieth century.

== Early life and education ==
Mitchell was born in Philadelphia, Pennsylvania, on February 17, 1862. He was the son of a noted writer and neurologist, S. Weir Mitchell, and his first wife, Mary Middleton Elwyn. His elder brother was John Kearsley Mitchell, a neurologist. After his mother died in 1862, his father married Mary Cadwalader. His paternal grandfather was writer and physician John Kearsley Mitchell.

Mitchell studied in Dresden, Germany, and Paris, France. He attended the Harvard University and then Columbia Law School, and was admitted to the New York bar in 1886.

== Career ==
A member of the American Academy of Arts and Letters, he wrote plays under his own name and poetry under the pen name "John Philip Varley." Along with Clyde Fitch, William Vaughn Moody, Percy MacKaye, Ned Sheldon and Rachel Crothers, Langdon Mitchell was regarded as one of the more serious American dramatists in an era (c. 1900-1910) not notable for weighty plays. He was considered a solid craftsman whose plays provided good parts for talented actors and actresses.

Mitchell enjoyed an especially productive relationship with one of the most prominent actresses of his time, Mrs. Minnie Maddern Fiske, who was one of the first actresses to play Nora in Ibsen's A Doll's House on the New York stage and was renowned for her Hedda Gabler. Mrs. Fiske acted one of her most lauded roles, the conniving Becky Sharp, in 1899 in Mitchell's dramatization of Thackeray's Vanity Fair, and she starred seven years later in his most famous work, The New York Idea, a play which had been written for her. (The New York Idea is the only play by Mitchell to have survived his era and is occasionally performed in regional theaters. It was revived off-Broadway in New York in 1977, in a production starring Blythe Danner, and again in 2011, in an adaptation by David Auburn, the author of Proof.)

Theater critic and historian Brooks Atkinson wrote in 1970 of The New York Idea, a tart comedy about divorce, that "the dialogue is still lively and the idiocies of the character are still pertinent," securely placing it in the long tradition of drawing-room comedy. Some reviewers at the time sanctimoniously took issue with the idea of a comedy about a socially questionable topic such as divorce, but others praised Mitchell for writing in the spirit of British playwrights Arthur Wing Pinero and Henry Arthur Jones.

Mitchell taught playwriting at the University of Pennsylvania from 1928 to 1930.

== Personal life ==
In 1891, Mitchell married Marion Lea (1861–1944), an actress who was on the London stage at the time of their marriage. She was a daughter of Joseph Lea and Susanna (née Massey) Lea. Together, they were the parents of:

- Weir Mitchell (1892–1988), an executive with the Borden Milk Company of New York; he married Annette Beckon.
- Ms. Mitchell, who married architect Kenneth Mackenzie Day.
- Susanna Valentine Mitchell (1896–1979), an author and poet who married William Gammell IV in 1925. They later divorced.

After suffering from nephritis, Mitchell died at the Hospital of the University of Pennsylvania on October 21, 1935. His widow died at Doctors Hospital in New York in June 1944.

== Major plays ==
- In the Season (1893)
- Becky Sharp (1899): a dramatization of English author William Makepeace Thackeray's (1811-1863), classical novel of 1847/48 Vanity Fair. Becky Sharp presented on stage on New York City's Broadway theatre in 1899, with Maurice Barrymore (1849-1905), and was remade as a feature film 36 years later in 1935.
- A Kentucky Belle
- Step by Step
- The New York Idea (1907)
- The Kreutzer Sonata (1907), adapted from the Yiddish of Jacob Gordin.
- The New Marriage (1911)

== Other Writings ==
- Sylvian and Other Poems (1884)
- Poems (1894)
- Love in the Backwoods (1896)
- Understanding America (1927)
