= Richard J. Beamish =

American lawyer and journalist

Richard Joseph Beamish
- c. 1931

Secretary of the Commonwealth of Pennsylvania
- In office January 20, 1931 – October 17, 1934
- Governor: Gifford Pinchot
- Preceded by: James Walker
- Succeeded by: John J. Owen

Personal details
- Born: November 6, 1869 Scranton, Lackawanna County, Pennsylvania, U.S.
- Died: October 1, 1945 (aged 75) Harrisburg, Dauphin County, Pennsylvania, U.S.
- Spouse: Maude Weatherly
- Profession: Attorney, journalist, author

Richard Joseph Beamish (November 6, 1869 – October 1, 1945) was a Pennsylvania lawyer and journalist. He served a term as the state's Secretary of the Commonwealth, and served on the state's Public Utilities Commission.

== Life and career ==
Beamish was born the son of Francis Allen Beamish and Mary Loftus. Francis Beamish had served a term as mayor of Scranton, and was owner and editor of the Scranton Free Press.

Beamish attended the National School of Elocution in Ontario and the newly founded St. Thomas College in Scranton, where he also served as the football coach beginning in 1893. He was admitted to the bar and appointed Assistant District Attorney in Lackawanna County in 1890, at the age of 21. After three years, he became editor of the Scranton Free Press, and later was editor and journalist for several Philadelphia newspapers. He also taught and coached the debate team at St. Thomas College.

In 1908, Beamish was involved in George Gray's campaign for the Democratic nomination for the Presidency, which Gray lost to William Jennings Bryan. He then switched to the Republican Party, though he would later realign himself with the Democrats.

In 1917, he wrote the libretto for Camille Zeckwer's cantata The Mischianza, basing it on Silas Weir Mitchell's novel Hugh Wynne.

During his years as a reporter for the Philadelphia Inquirer, Beamish covered the 1925 Scopes trial, serving as chairman of the press committee.

In 1926, he was appointed by Governor Gifford Pinchot to the state's Public Service Commission. During Pinchot's second term, in 1930, Beamish was appointed Secretary of the Commonwealth. He resigned in 1934 and returned to newspaper work so as to support Democratic candidates.

In 1937, Governor George H. Earle appointed Beamish as chief counsel to the state's Public Utilities Commission, the newly reconstituted and named former Public Service Commission, for a six-year term. During the war, he proposed banning college football.

Beamish suffered from tuberculosis in his early life. He was pronounced cured after two years, and in later years organized the International Tuberculosis Exposition and Congress in Washington, D.C.

Beamish died of a heart attack on October 1, 1945, at his home in Harrisburg, Pennsylvania.

== Bibliography ==
- The Story of Lindbergh, the Lone Eagle. Philadelphia: International Press. 1927.
- Beamish, Richard; Marsh, Francis (1919). History of the World War: America's part in the World War: a history of the full greatness of our country's achievements, the record of the mobilization and triumph of the military, naval, industrial and civilian resources of the United States. Philadelphia, PA: John C. Winston Company. OCLC 38889327.

Political offices
| Preceded by James Walker | Pennsylvania Secretary of the Commonwealth; 1931–1934 | Succeeded by John J. Owen |
