= Vanity Fair (novel) =

1847–1848 novel by William Makepeace Thackeray

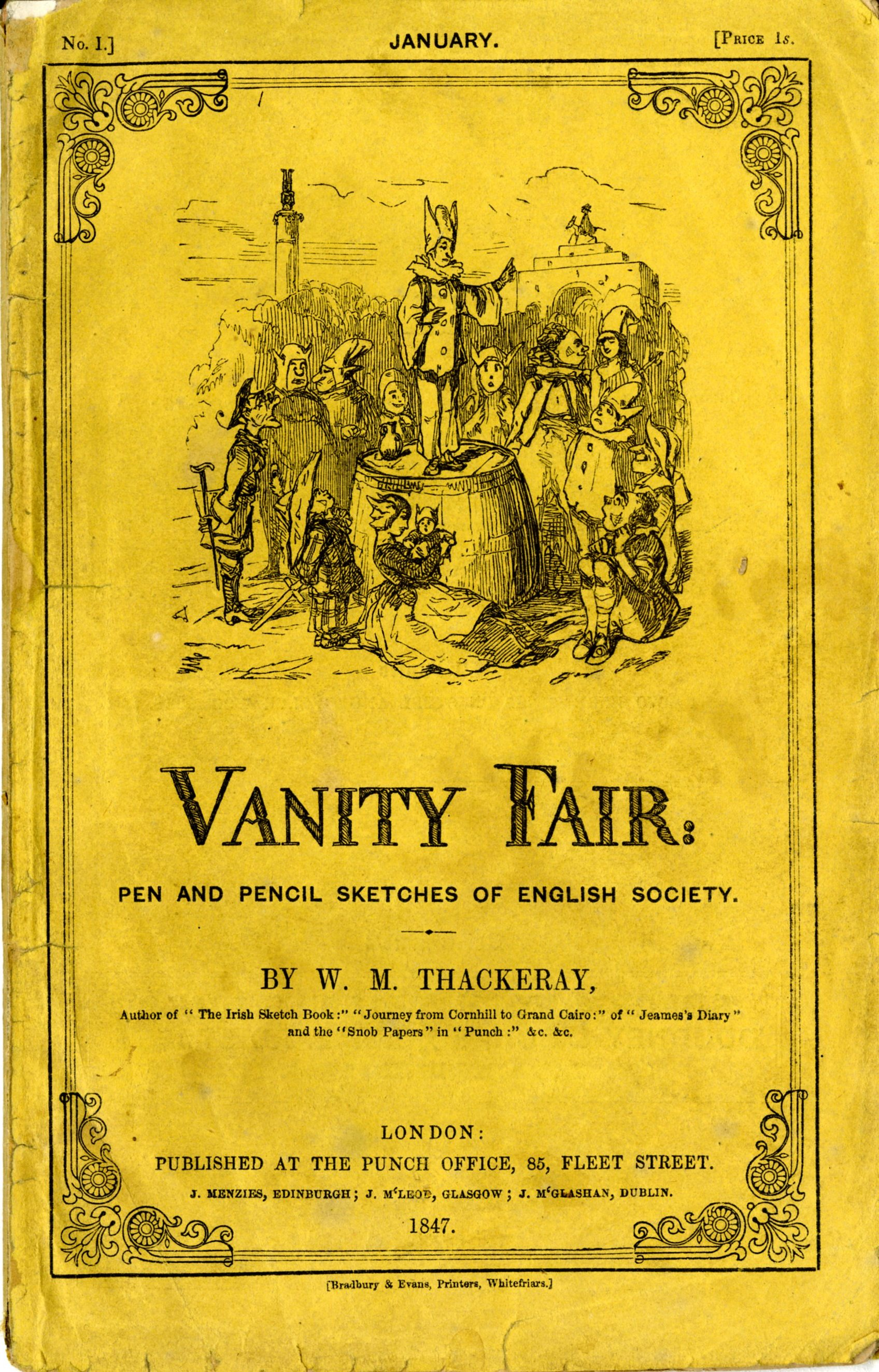
- Title page to the first issue of the Vanity Fair 1847–1848 serial, whose canary-yellow colour became a Thackeray hallmark. Thackeray was also responsible for its illustrations.
- Author: William Makepeace Thackeray
- Working title: Pen and Pencil Sketches of English Society
- Illustrator: William Makepeace Thackeray
- Language: English
- Genre: satire, social criticism
- Set in: England, Low Countries, Madras, Rhineland; 1814–1832
- Publisher: Punch (serialised); Bradbury and Evans (bound edition)
- Publication date: January 1847 to July 1848 (serialised in 20 parts)
- Publication place: United Kingdom
- Media type: Print
- Pages: xvi,624 (1848 first edition)
- OCLC: 18798256
- Dewey Decimal: 823.8
- LC Class: PR5618 .A1
- Preceded by: Mrs. Perkins's Ball
- Followed by: The Book of Snobs
- Text: Vanity Fair at Wikisource

Vanity Fair is a satirical novel by the English author William Makepeace Thackeray, which follows the lives of Becky Sharp and Amelia Sedley amid their friends and families during and after the Napoleonic Wars. It was first published as a 19-volume monthly serial (the last containing parts 19 and 20) from 1847 to 1848, carrying the subtitle Pen and Pencil Sketches of English Society, which reflects both its satirisation of early 19th-century British society and the many illustrations drawn by Thackeray to accompany the text. It was published as a single volume in 1848 with the subtitle A Novel without a Hero. It is sometimes considered the "principal founder" of the Victorian domestic novel.

The story is framed as a puppet play, and the narrator, despite being an authorial voice, is somewhat unreliable. The serial was a popular and critical success; the novel is now considered a classic and has inspired several audio, film, and television adaptations. It also inspired the title of the British lifestyle magazine first published in 1868, which became known for its caricatures of famous people of Victorian and Edwardian society. In 2003, Vanity Fair was listed at No. 122 on the BBC's The Big Read poll of the UK's best-loved books.

== Title ==
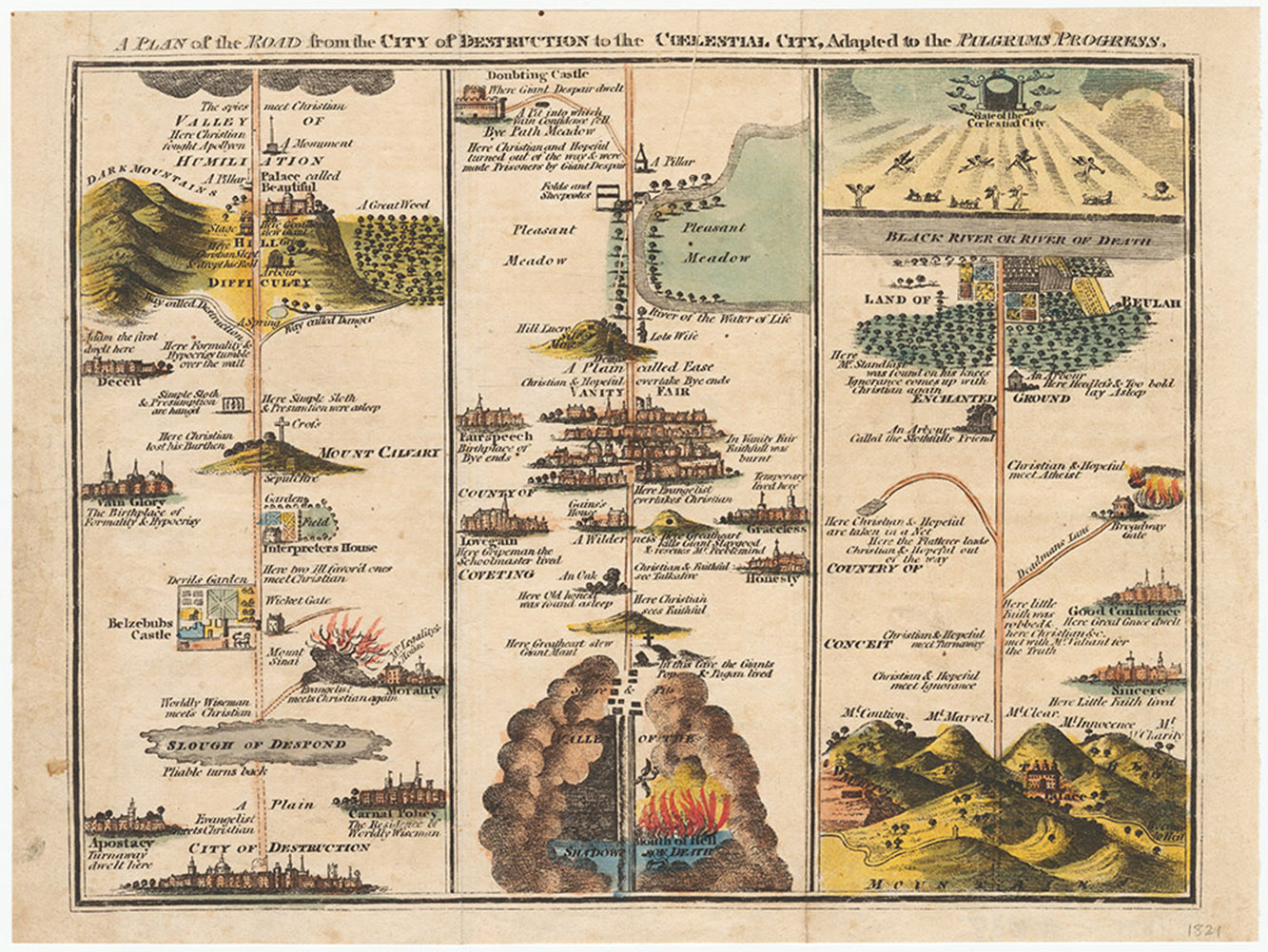
A reprint of John Bunyan's Plan of the Road from the City of Destruction to the Celestial City, including Vanity Fair as the major city along the path

The book's title comes from John Bunyan's Pilgrim's Progress, (Note: "It beareth the name of Vanity Fair, because the town where it is kept is 'lighter than vanity.") a Dissenter allegory first published in 1678. In that work, "Vanity Fair" refers to a stop along the pilgrim's route: a never-ending fair held in a town called Vanity, which represents man's sinful attachment to worldly things. Thackeray does not mention Bunyan in the novel or in his surviving letters about it, where he describes himself dealing with "living without God in the world", but he did expect the reference to be understood by his audience, as shown in an 1851 Times article likely written by Thackeray himself.

Robert Bell—whose friendship later became so great that he was buried near Thackeray at Kensal Green Cemetery—complained that the novel could have used "more light and air" to make it "more agreeable and healthy". Thackeray rebutted this with Evangelist's words as the pilgrims entered Bunyan's Vanity Fair: "The heart is deceitful above all things, and desperately wicked; who can know it?"

From its appearance in Bunyan, "Vanity Fair" or a "vanity-fair" was also in general use for "the world" in a range of connotations from the blandly descriptive to the wearily dismissive to the condemning. By the 18th century, it was generally taken as a playground and, in the first half of the 19th century, more specifically the playground of the idle and undeserving rich. All of these senses appear in Thackeray's work. The name "Vanity Fair" has also been used for at least 5 periodicals.

== Plot summary ==
The story is framed by its preface and coda as a puppet show taking place at a fair; the cover illustration of the serial installments was not of the characters but of a troupe of comic actors at Speakers' Corner in Hyde Park. The narrator, variously a show manager or writer, appears at times within the work itself and is somewhat unreliable, (Note: The narrator claims in Chapter 62 to have first seen Dobbin, Amelia, and Jos at Pumpernickel on their European tour (so very late in the narrative) and that he is "the present writer of a history of which every word is true", but admits that most of his story has been gossip.) repeating a tale of gossip at second or third hand.

In London in 1814, Rebecca Sharp ("Becky"), daughter of an art teacher and a French dancer, is a strong-willed, cunning, moneyless young woman determined to make her way in society. After leaving school, Becky stays with her friend Amelia Sedley ("Emmy"), who is a good-natured, simple-minded young girl, of a wealthy London family. There, Becky meets the dashing and self-obsessed Captain George Osborne (Amelia's betrothed) and Amelia's brother Joseph ("Jos") Sedley, a clumsy and vainglorious but rich civil servant home from the East India Company. Hoping to marry Sedley, the richest young man she has met, Becky entices him, but fails in her quest. George Osborne's friend Captain William Dobbin loves Amelia, but only wishes her happiness, which is centred on George.

Becky Sharp says farewell to the Sedley family and enters the service of the crude and profligate baronet Sir Pitt Crawley, who has engaged her as a governess to his daughters. Her behaviour at Sir Pitt's house gains his favour, and after the premature death of his second wife, he proposes marriage to her. However, he finds that Becky has secretly married his second son, Captain Rawdon Crawley, a plot orchestrated by Bute Crawley to ensure that Sir Pitt's elder half-sister, the spinster Miss Crawley, who is very rich (having inherited her mother's fortune) disinherits Rawdon. The whole Crawley family competes for her favour so she will bequeath them her wealth; initially her favourite is Rawdon Crawley, but his marriage with Becky enrages her. First she favours the family of Sir Pitt's brother, but when she dies, she leaves her money to Sir Pitt's eldest son, also called Pitt.

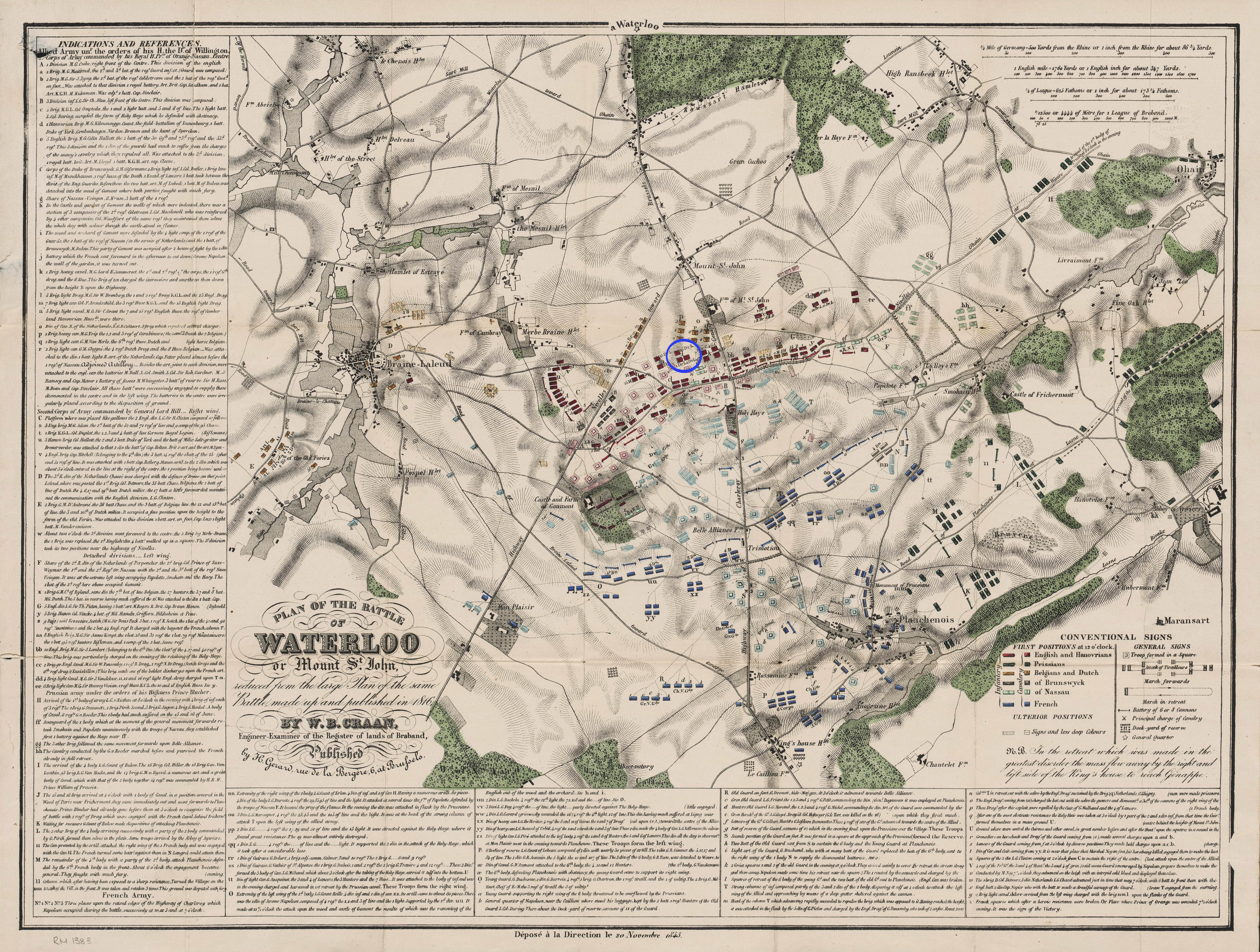
Chapter 32 ends with Waterloo: "No more firing was heard at Brussels—the pursuit rolled miles away. The darkness came down on the field and city, and Amelia was praying for George, who was lying on his face, dead, with a bullet through his heart.

News arrives that Napoleon has escaped from Elba, and as a result the stockmarket becomes jittery, causing Amelia's stockbroker father, John Sedley, to become bankrupt. George's rich father forbids George to marry Amelia, who is now poor. Dobbin persuades George to marry Amelia, and George is consequently disinherited. George Osborne, William Dobbin and Rawdon Crawley are deployed to Brussels, accompanied by Amelia and Becky, and Amelia's brother, Jos.

George is embarrassed by the vulgarity of Mrs O'Dowd, the wife of the head of the regiment. Newly wedded, he is already growing tired of Amelia, and becomes increasingly attracted to Becky, which makes Amelia jealous and unhappy. He is also losing money to Rawdon at cards and billiards. At a ball in Brussels, George gives Becky a note inviting her to run away with him (although this fact is not revealed until the end of the book). But then the army receives marching orders, and George spends a tender night with Amelia before leaving.

The noise of battle horrifies Amelia, and she is comforted by the brisk but kind Mrs O'Dowd. Becky is indifferent and makes plans for whatever the outcome (for example, if Napoleon wins, she would aim to become the mistress of one of his marshals). She also makes a profit selling her carriage and horses at inflated prices to Jos, who is seeking to flee Brussels.

George Osborne is killed at the Battle of Waterloo, while Dobbin and Rawdon survive the battle. Amelia bears a posthumous son, who carries on the name George. She returns to live in genteel poverty with her parents, spending her life in memory of her husband and care of her son. Dobbin pays for a small annuity for Amelia and expresses his love for her by small kindnesses toward her and her son. She is too much in love with her husband's memory to return Dobbin's love. Saddened, he goes with his regiment to India for many years.

Becky also gives birth to a son, named Rawdon after his father. She is a cold, distant mother, although Rawdon loves his son. Becky continues her ascent first in post-war Paris and then in London where she is patronised by the rich and powerful Marquis of Steyne. She is eventually presented at court to the Prince Regent and charms him further at a game of charades where she plays the roles of Clytemnestra and Philomela. The elderly Sir Pitt Crawley dies and is succeeded by his son Pitt, who had married Lady Jane Sheepshanks, Lord Southdown's third daughter. Becky is on good terms with Pitt and Jane originally, but Jane is disgusted by Becky's attitude to her son and jealous of Becky's relationship with Pitt.

At the summit of their social success, Rawdon is arrested for debt, possibly at Becky's connivance. The financial success of the Crawleys had been a topic of gossip; in fact they were living on credit even when it ruined those who trusted them, such as their landlord, an old servant of the Crawley family. The Marquis of Steyne had given Becky money, jewels, and other gifts but Becky does not use them for expenses or to free her husband. Instead, Rawdon's letter to his brother is received by Lady Jane, who pays the £170 that prompted his imprisonment.

He returns home to find Becky singing to Steyne and strikes him down on the assumption—despite her protestations of innocence—that they are having an affair. Steyne is indignant, having assumed the £1000 he had just given Becky was part of an arrangement with her husband. Rawdon finds Becky's hidden bank records and leaves her, expecting Steyne to challenge him to a duel. Instead Steyne arranges for Rawdon to be made Governor of Coventry Island, a pestilential and disease-ridden location. Becky, having lost both husband and credibility, leaves England and wanders the continent, leaving her son in the care of Pitt and Lady Jane.

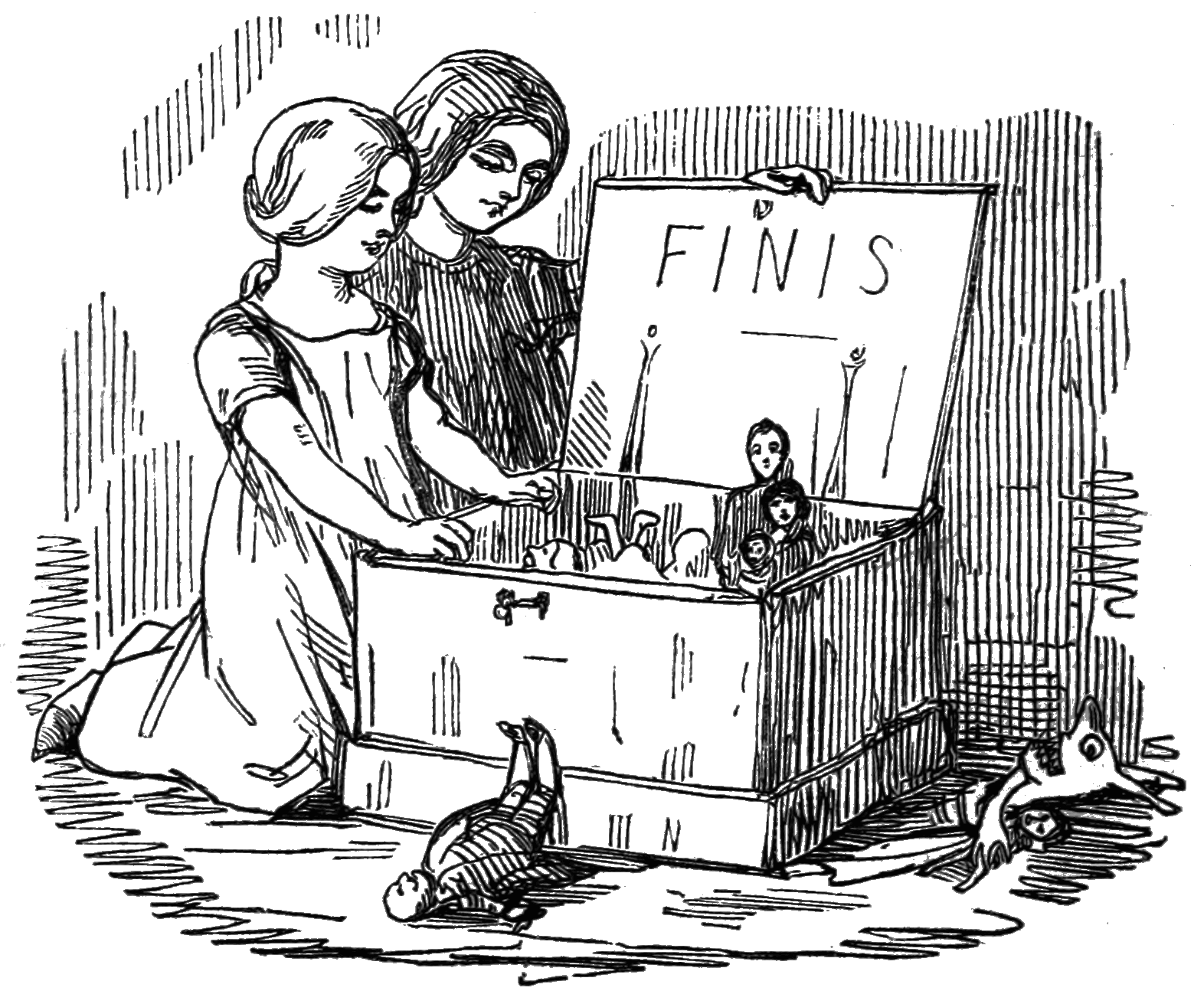
Two girls close up their box of dolls at the end of the story

As Amelia's adored son George grows up, his grandfather Mr Osborne relents towards him (though not towards Amelia) and takes him from his impoverished mother, who knows the rich old man will give him a better start in life than she could manage. After twelve years abroad, both Joseph Sedley and Dobbin return. Dobbin professes his unchanged love to Amelia. Amelia is affectionate, but she cannot forget the memory of her dead husband. Dobbin mediates a reconciliation between Amelia and her father-in-law, who dies soon after. His newly-amended will bequeaths young George half his large fortune and Amelia a generous annuity.

Amelia, Jos, George and Dobbin go to Pumpernickel (Weimar in Germany), where they encounter the destitute Becky. She lives among card sharps and con artists, drinking heavily and gambling. Becky enchants Jos Sedley all over again, and Amelia is persuaded to let Becky join them. Dobbin is opposed, and reminds Amelia of her jealousy of Becky with her husband. Amelia feels that this dishonours her lost husband's memory, and the disagreement leads to a complete breach between Dobbin and her. He leaves and rejoins his regiment, while Becky remains with the group.

However, Becky has decided that Amelia should marry Dobbin after being preyed upon by two reprobate students gambling for her. Becky shows Amelia George's note, kept all this time from the eve of the Battle of Waterloo; Amelia realises that George was not the perfect man she had idolized, and that she has rejected a better man. Amelia and Dobbin are reconciled and return to England. Becky and Jos stay in Europe. Jos dies suspiciously after signing a portion of his life insurance money to Becky. She returns to England, and manages to lead a respectable life, although all her previous friends refuse to acknowledge her.

== Characters ==
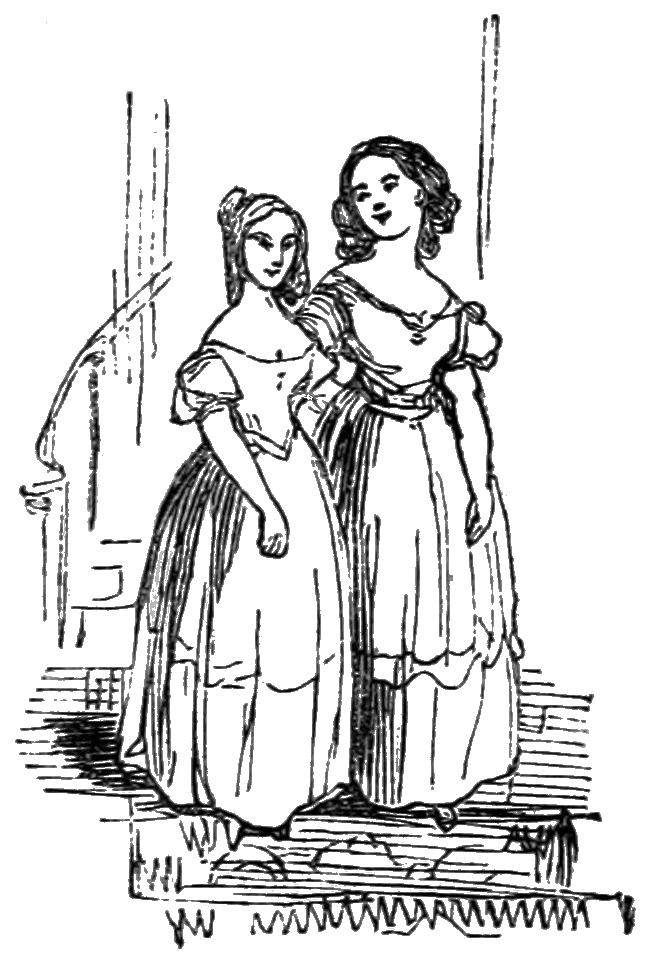
Becky and Emmy as girls, from one of Thackeray's illustrations at the beginning of the book

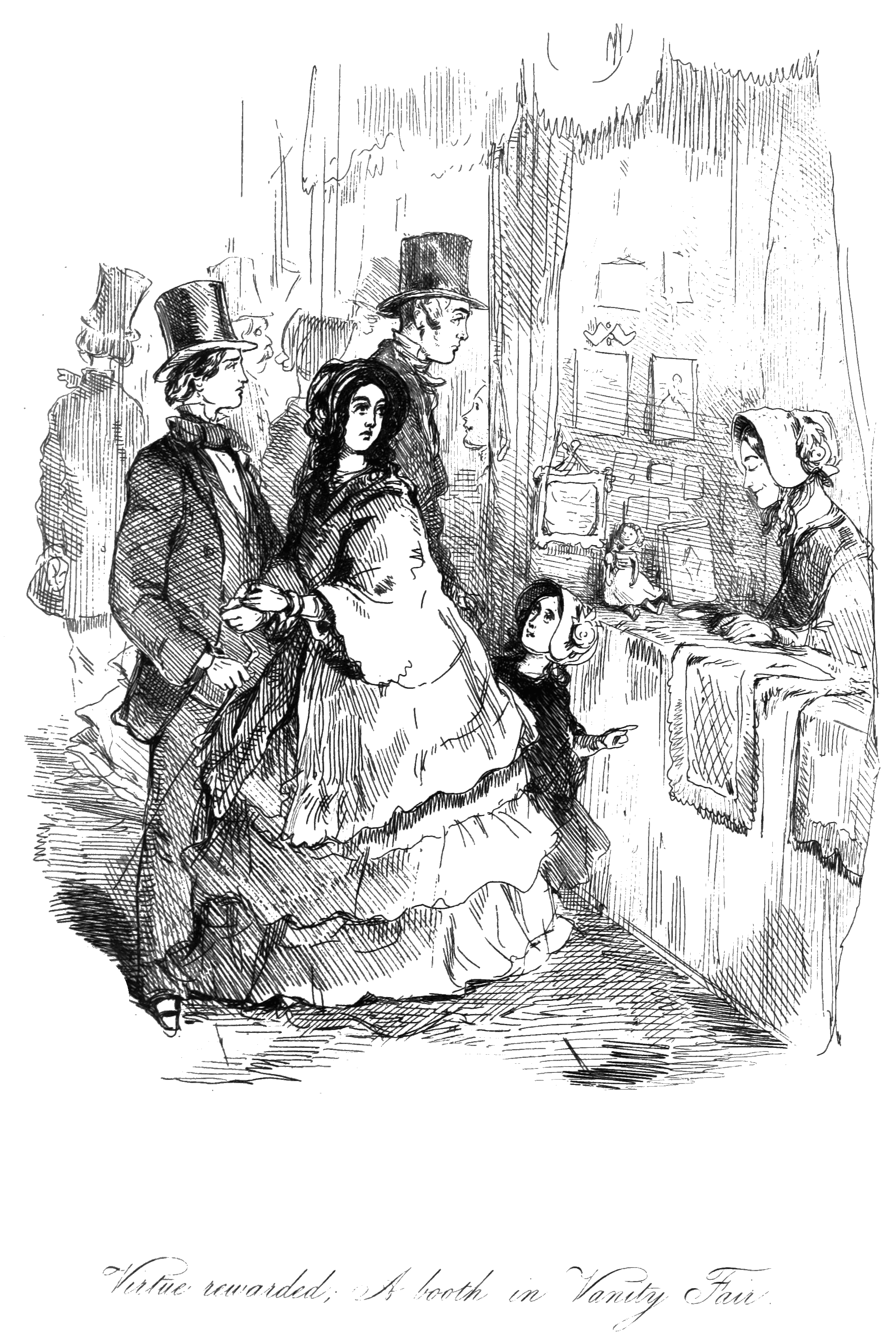
Virtue rewarded; A booth in Vanity Fair. Emmy and her family encounter Becky by chance at a charity event on the last page of the novel

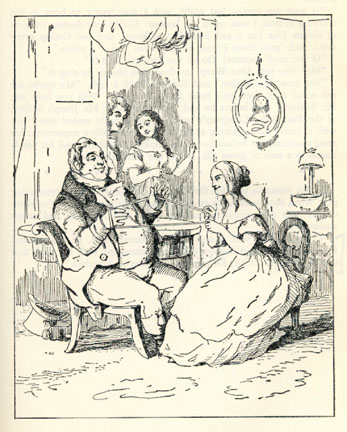
Mr. Joseph entangled by Becky

=== Emmy Sedley (Amelia) ===
Amelia, called Emmy, is good-natured but passive and naïve. Pretty rather than beautiful, she has a snub nose and round, rosy cheeks. She is well-liked by men, and women when few men are around, as was the case when she was at school. She begins the work as its heroine ("selected for the very reason that she was the best-natured of all") and marries the dashing George Osborne against his father's wishes, but the narrator is soon forced to admit "she wasn't a heroine" after all as she remains soppily devoted to him despite his neglect of her and his flirtation with Becky.

After George dies at the Battle of Waterloo, she brings up little George alone while living with her parents. She is completely dominated by her increasingly peevish mother and her spendthrift father, who, to finance one of his failing investment schemes, sells the annuity Jos had provided. Amelia becomes obsessed with her son and the memory of her husband. She ignores William Dobbin, who courts her for years and treats him shabbily until he leaves. Only when Becky shows her George's letter to her, indicating his unfaithfulness, can Amelia move on. She then marries Dobbin.

In a letter to his close friend Jane Octavia Brookfield while the book was being written, Thackeray confided that "You know you are only a piece of Amelia, my mother is another half, my poor little wife y est pour beaucoup". (Note: French: "...is the rest.") Within the work, her character is compared and connected to Iphigenia, although two of the references extend the allusion to all daughters in all drawing rooms as potential Iphigenias waiting to be sacrificed by their families.

=== Becky Sharp (Rebecca) ===
Rebecca Sharp, called Becky, is Amelia's opposite: an intelligent, conniving young woman with a gift for satire. She is described as a slight, sandy-haired girl with green eyes and a great deal of wit. Becky is born to a French opera dancer mother and an art teacher and artist father, Francis. Fluent in both French and English, she has a beautiful singing voice, plays the piano very well, and shows great talent as an actress. Without a mother to guide her into marriage, Becky resolves that "I must be my own Mamma".

She thereafter appears to be completely amoral and without conscience and has been called the work's "anti-heroine". She does not seem to have the ability to get attached to other people, and lies easily and intelligently to get her way. She is extremely manipulative and after the first few chapters and her failure to attract Jos Sedley, she becomes more skilled in her machinations.

Never having known financial or social security as a child, Becky desires it above all things. Nearly everything she does is with the intention of securing a stable position for herself, and her husband after she marries Rawdon. She advances Rawdon's interests tirelessly, flirting with men such as General Tufto and the Marquis of Steyne to get him promoted. She also uses her feminine wiles to distract men at card parties while Rawdon cheats them blind.

Marrying Rawdon Crawley in secret was a mistake, as was running off instead of begging Miss Crawley's forgiveness. She also fails to manipulate Miss Crawley through Rawdon so as to obtain an inheritance. Although Becky manipulates men easily, she is far less successful with women. She is utterly hostile to Lady Bareacres, dismissive of Mrs O'Dowd, and Lady Jane, although initially friendly, eventually distrusts and dislikes her.

The exceptions to this trend are (at least initially) Miss Crawley, her companion Miss Briggs, and her school friend Amelia; the latter is the recipient of the only kindnesses Becky expresses in the work, such as persuading her to marry Dobbin in light of what Becky comes to appreciate to be his good qualities and protecting Amelia from two ruffians vying for her attentions. This comparative loyalty to Amelia stems from Becky having had no other friends at school, and Amelia having "by a thousand kind words and offices, overcome... (Becky's) hostility"; "The gentle tender-hearted Amelia Sedley was the only person to whom she could attach herself in the least; and who could help attaching herself to Amelia?"

Beginning with her determination to be her "own Mamma", Becky begins to assume the role of Clytemnestra. She and her necklace from Steyne also allude to the fallen Eriphyle in Racine's retelling of Iphigenia at Aulis, where she doubles and rescues Iphigenia. In lesser contexts, Becky also appears as Arachne to Miss Pinkerton's Minerva and as a variety of classical figures in the works' illustrations.

=== George Osborne ===
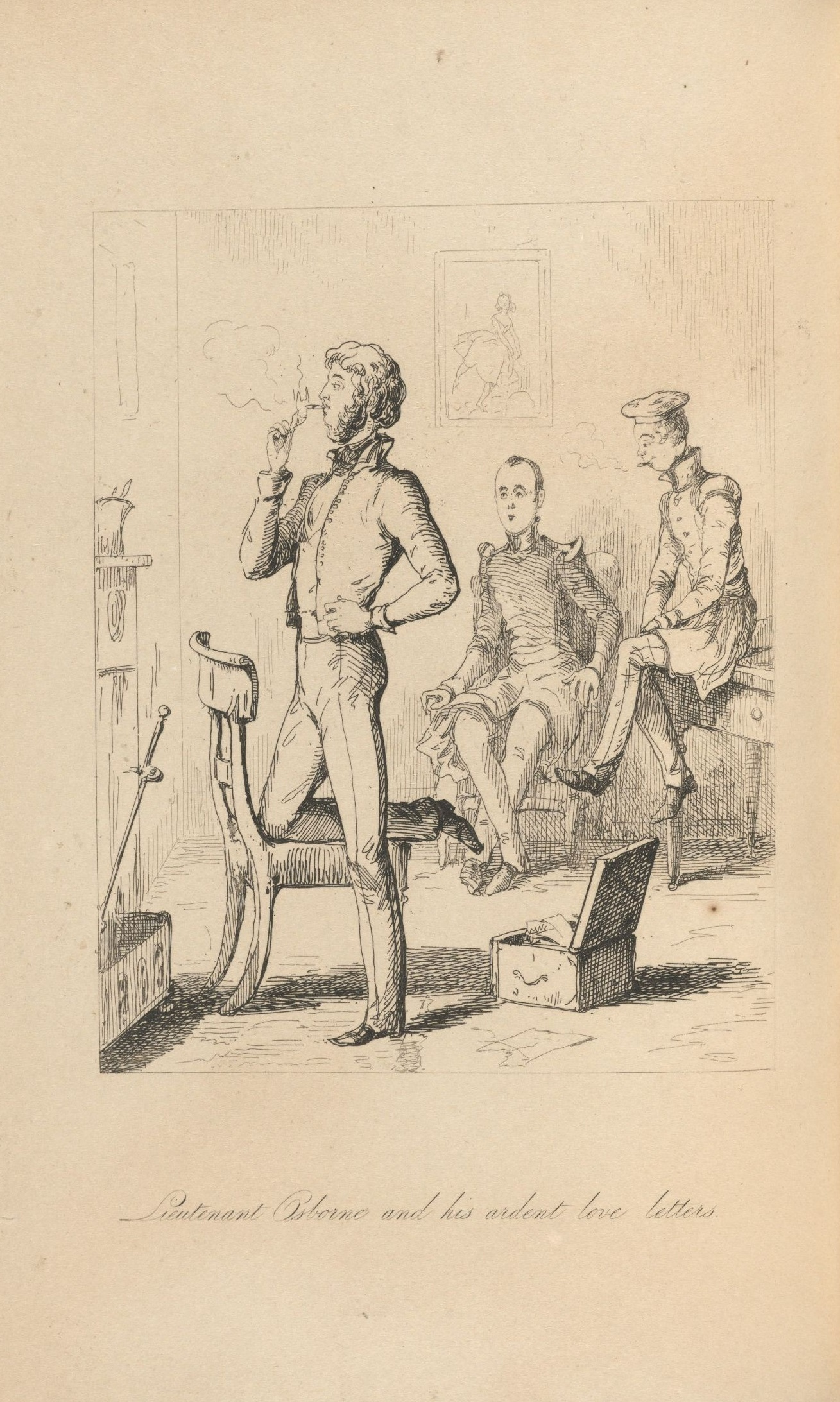
George Osborne

George Osborne, his father, a merchant of considerably superior social status to Dobbin's grocer father, albeit self made, and ironically a mere corporal in the City Light Horse regiment of which Dobbin senior, by this time an alderman and a knight, is colonel, and his two sisters are close to the Sedley family until Mr. Sedley (the father of Jos and Amelia, and George Osborne's godfather, from whom the latter takes his middle name of 'Sedley') goes bankrupt following some ill-advised speculation. Since George and Amelia were raised in close company and were childhood sweethearts, George defies his father by marrying Amelia, aides by Dobbin. Before father and son can be reconciled, George is killed at the battle of Waterloo, leaving the pregnant Amelia to carry on as well as she can.

Raised to be a selfish, vain, profligate spender, handsome and self-obsessed, George squanders the last of the money he receives from his father and sets nothing aside to help support Amelia. After marrying Amelia, after a couple of weeks he quickly realized that he is bored. He flirts with Becky quite seriously and is reconciled to Amelia only a short time before he is killed in battle.

=== William Dobbin ===
The best friend of George Osborne, Captain William Dobbin is tall, ungainly, and not particularly handsome. He is a six years older than George but has been friends with him since his schooldays, even though Dobbin's father is a fig-merchant (Dobbin & Rudge, grocers and oilmen, Thames Street, London – he is later an alderman and colonel of the City Light Horse regiment, and is knighted) and the Osbornes act as though they belong to the genteel class; they have become wealthy. Dobbin defends George and is blind to his faults in many ways, although he tries to persuade George to do the right thing. He pushes George to keep his promise to marry Amelia even though Dobbin is in love with Amelia himself. After George is killed, Dobbin puts together an annuity to help support Amelia, ostensibly with the help of George's fellow officers.

Later, Major and Lieutenant Colonel Dobbin discreetly does what he can to help support Amelia and her son George. Amelia continues to be obsessed with George; he does not correct her erroneous beliefs. He hangs about for years, either pining away over her while serving in India or waiting on her in person, allowing her to take advantage of his good nature. After Amelia chooses Becky's friendship over his during their stay in Germany, Dobbin leaves in disgust. He returns when Amelia writes to him and admits her feelings for him, marries her, and they have a daughter whom he loves more than Amelia.

=== Rawdon Crawley ===
Rawdon, the younger of the two Crawley sons, is an empty-headed cavalry officer who is his wealthy aunt's favourite until he marries Becky Sharp, daughter of an opera dancer and painter; permanently alienating his aunt. She leaves her estate to Rawdon's elder brother Sir Pitt instead. Sir Pitt has also inherited their father's estate, leaving Rawdon destitute.

The well-meaning Rawdon does have a few talents in life, most of them having to do with gambling and duelling. He is very good at cards and billiards, and although he does not always win he is able to earn cash by betting against less talented gamblers. He is heavily indebted throughout most of the book, not so much for his own expenses as for Becky's. Not particularly talented as a military officer, he is content to let Becky manage his career. He is sincere and dotes on his son, whom Becky hates.

Although Rawdon knows Becky is attractive to men, he believes she's just flirtatious, even though she is widely suspected of romantic intrigues. Nobody dares to suggest otherwise to Rawdon because of his temper and his reputation for duelling. Yet other people, particularly the Marquis of Steyne, find it impossible to believe that Crawley is unaware of Becky's tricks. Steyne in particular believes Rawdon is fully aware that Becky is prostituting herself, and believes Rawdon is going along with the charade in the hope of financial gain.

After Rawdon finds out the truth, beats up the Marquise of Steyne and issues him a challenge, Steyne avoids the duel and solves the problem by getting him an assignment on a fever-ridden island. His son is brought up by his brother Sir Pitt and his wife Lady Jane. Rawdon dies of yellow fever.

=== Pitt Crawley ===
Rawdon Crawley's elder brother inherits the Crawley estate from his father, the boorish and vulgar Sir Pitt, and also inherits the estate of his wealthy aunt, Miss Crawley, after she disinherits Rawdon. Pitt is hypocritically religious and has political aspirations.

Pedantic and conservative, Pitt does nothing to help Rawdon or Becky even when they fall on hard times. This is chiefly due to the influence of his wife, Lady Jane, who dislikes Becky because of her callous treatment of her son, and also because Becky repaid Lady Jane's earlier kindness by patronising her and flirting with Sir Pitt.

=== Miss Matilda Crawley ===
The elderly Miss Crawley is everyone's favourite wealthy aunt. Sir Pitt and Rawdon both dote on her for her money. Rawdon is her favourite nephew and expects to inherit her money until he marries Becky. While Miss Crawley likes Becky and keeps her around to entertain her with sarcasm and wit, and while she loves scandal and stories of unwise marriages, this does not apply to her family.

Thackeray spent time in Paris with his maternal grandmother, Harriet Becher, and Miss Crawley's character is said to be based on her.

=== Joseph Sedley ===
Amelia's older brother, Joseph "Jos" Sedley, is a "nabob", who made a respectable fortune as a collector in India. Obese and self-important but very shy, he is attracted to Becky Sharp but does not get around to proposing. He never marries, but when he meets Becky again he is easily manipulated into falling in love with her. Jos is not a courageous or intelligent man, displaying his cowardice at the Battle of Waterloo by trying to flee and purchasing both of Becky's overpriced horses. Becky ensnares him again near the end of the book and, it is hinted, murders him for his life insurance.

== Publication history ==
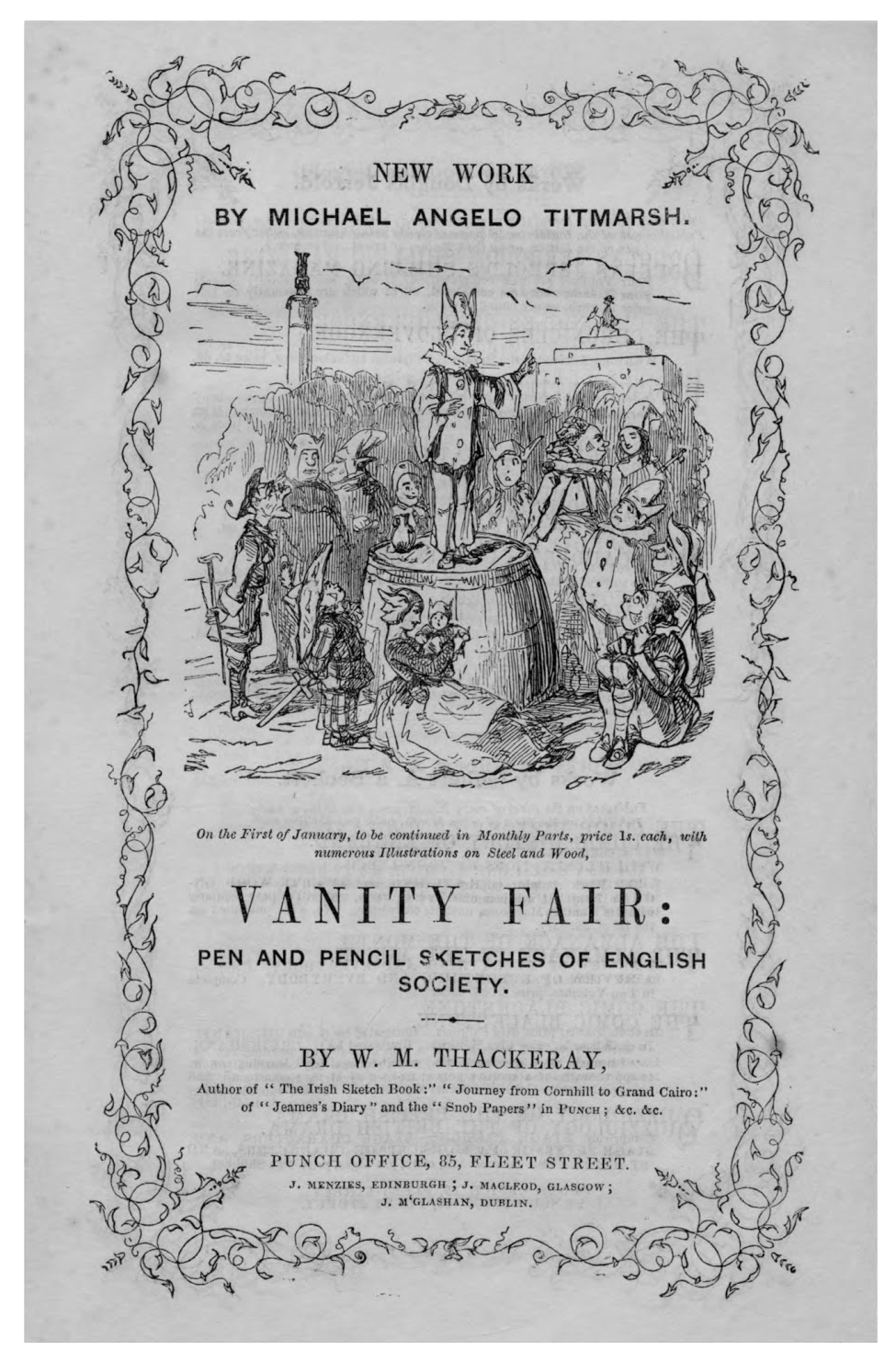
The 1847 prospectus for the Vanity Fair: Pen and Pencil Sketches of English Society serial, advertising it under William Makepeace Thackeray's pen name Michael Angelo Titmarsh and under his own name.

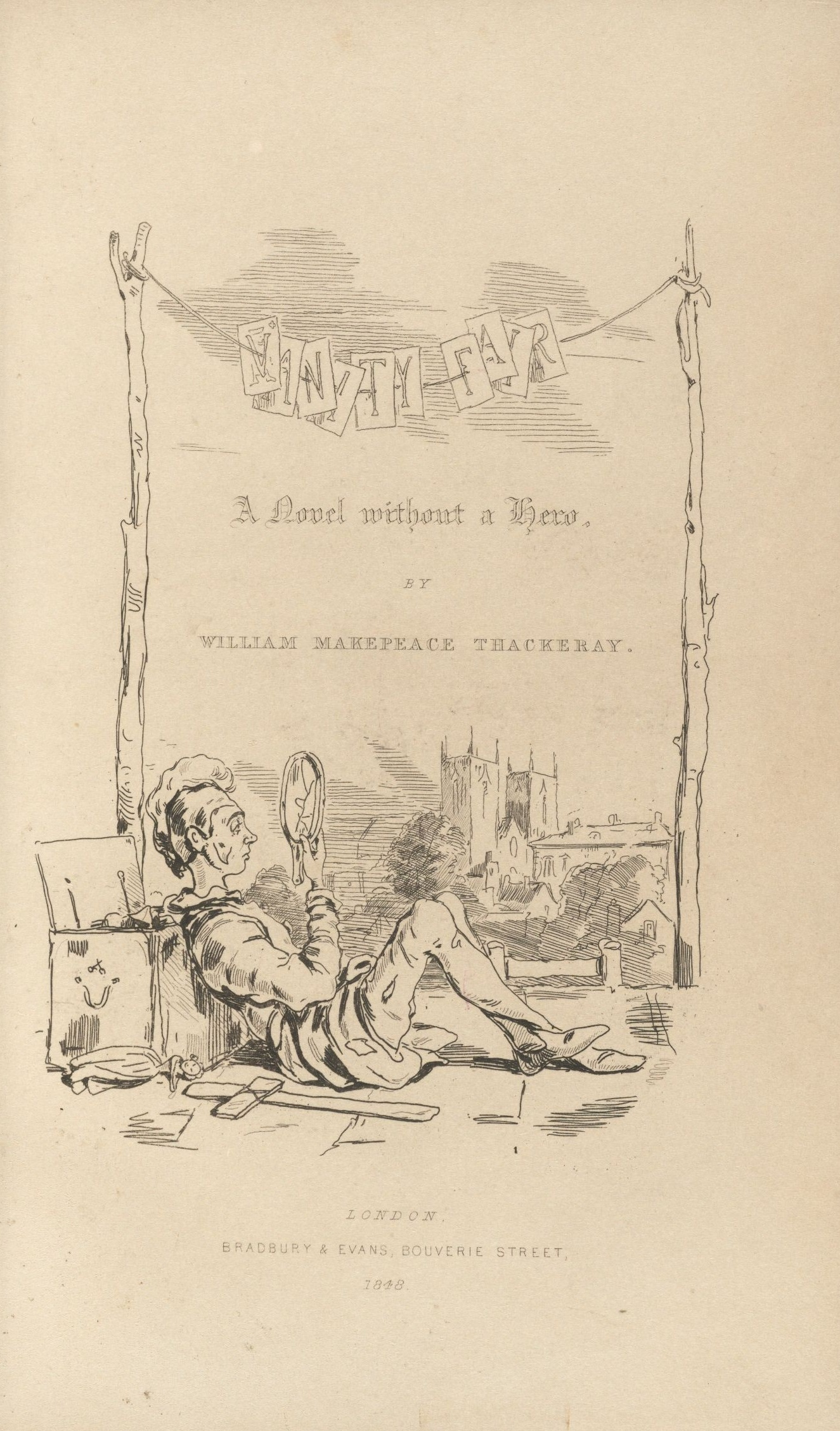
The title page of the 1848 first edition of Vanity Fair: A Novel without a Hero.

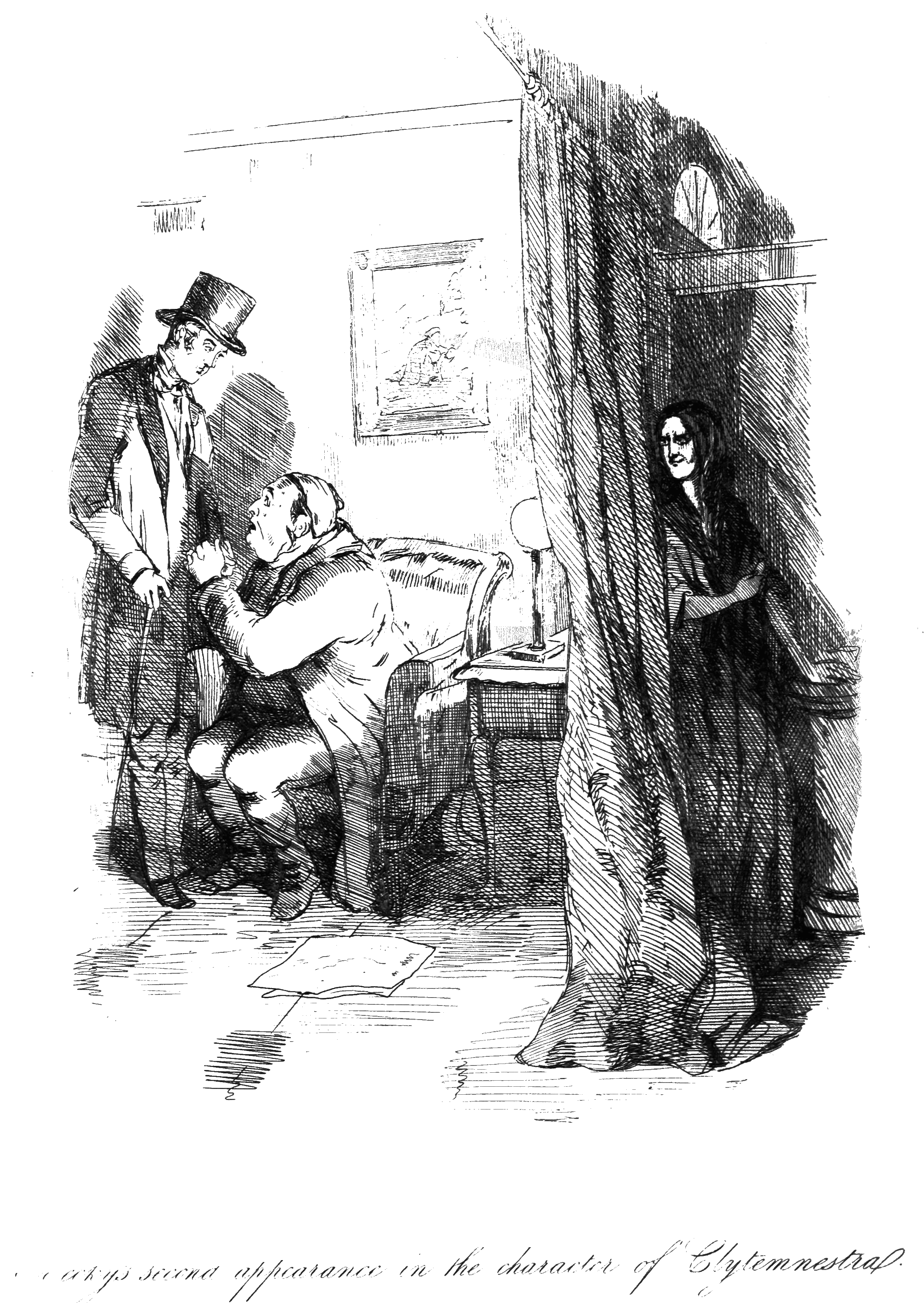
Becky's second appearance in the character of Clytemnestra, an illustration and caption by Thackeray that makes it fairly clear that she killed Jos for his insurance money.

Thackeray may have begun working out some of the details of Vanity Fair as early as 1841 but probably began writing it in late 1844. (Note: Tillotson & al., cited in York.) Like many novels of the time, Vanity Fair was published as a serial before being sold in book form. It was printed in 20 monthly parts between January 1847 and July 1848 for Punch by Bradbury & Evans in London. The first three had already been completed before publication, while the others were written after it had begun to sell.

As was standard practice, the last part was a "double number" containing parts 19 and 20. Surviving texts, his notes, and letters show that adjustments were made – e.g., the Battle of Waterloo was delayed twice – but that the broad outline of the story and its principal themes were well established from the beginning of publication. (Note: Tillotson & al., cited in York.)

No. 1 (January 1847) Ch. 1–4
No. 2 (February 1847) Ch. 5–7
No. 3 (March 1847) Ch. 8–11
No. 4 (April 1847) Ch. 12–14
No. 5 (May 1847) Ch. 15–18
No. 6 (June 1847) Ch. 19–22
No. 7 (July 1847) Ch. 23–25
No. 8 (August 1847) Ch. 26–29
No. 9 (September 1847) Ch. 30–32
No. 10 (October 1847) Ch. 33–35
No. 11 (November 1847) Ch. 36–38
No. 12 (December 1847) Ch. 39–42
No. 13 (January 1848) Ch. 43–46
No. 14 (February 1848) Ch. 47–50
No. 15 (March 1848) Ch. 51–53
No. 16 (April 1848) Ch. 54–56
No. 17 (May 1848) Ch. 57–60
No. 18 (June 1848) Ch. 61–63
No. 19/20 (July 1848) Ch. 64–67

The parts resembled pamphlets and contained the text of several chapters between outer pages of steel engravings and advertising. Wood engravings, which could be set along with normal moveable type, appeared within the text. The same engraved illustration appeared on the canary-yellow cover of each monthly part; this colour became Thackeray's signature, as a light blue-green was Dickens's, allowing passers-by to notice a new Thackeray number in a bookstall from a distance.

Vanity Fair was the first work that Thackeray published under his own name and was extremely well received at the time. After the conclusion of its serial publication, it was printed as a bound volume by Bradbury & Evans in 1848 and was quickly picked up by other London printers as well. As a collected work, the novels bore the subtitle A Novel without a Hero. (Note: In addition to its other intentions, the name was a jab at Thomas Carlyle's "Lectures on Hero and Hero-Worship".) By the end of 1859, royalties on Vanity Fair had only given Thackeray about £2000, a third of his take from The Virginians, but was responsible for his still more lucrative lecture tours in Britain and the United States. (Note: In the letter where he recorded these sums, Thackeray noted "Three more years please the Fates and the girls will have eight or ten thousand a-piece that I want for them: we must n't say a word against filthy lucre for I see the use and comfort of it every day more and more. What a blessing not to mind about bills.")

From his first draft and following publication, Thackeray occasionally revised his allusions to make them more accessible for his readers. In Chapter 5, an original "Prince Whadyecallem" became "Prince Ahmed" by the 1853 edition. In Chapter 13, a passage about the filicidal Biblical figure Jephthah was removed, although references to Iphigenia remained important. In Chapter 56, Thackeray originally confused Samuel – the boy whose mother Hannah had given him up when called to by God – with Eli, the old priest to whose care he was entrusted; this mistake was not corrected until the 1889 edition, after Thackeray's death.

The serials had been subtitled Pen and Pencil Sketches of English Society and both they and the early bound versions featured Thackeray's own illustrations. These sometimes provided symbolically-freighted images, such as one of the female characters being portrayed as a man-eating mermaid. In at least one case, a major plot point is provided through an image and its caption. Although the text makes it clear that other characters suspect Becky Sharp of having murdered her second husband, there is nothing definitive in the text itself. However, an image reveals her overhearing Jos pleading with Dobbin while clutching a small white object in her hand. The caption that this is Becky's second appearance in the character of Clytemnestra clarifies that she did indeed murder him for the insurance money, likely through laudanum or another poison.

"The final three illustrations of Vanity Fair are tableaux that insinuate visually what the narrator is unwilling to articulate: that Becky... has actually been substantially rewarded – by society – for her crimes." One of the Thackeray's plates for the 11th issue of Vanity Fair was suppressed from publication by threat of prosecution for libel, so great was the resemblance of its depiction of Lord Steyne to the Marquis of Hertford. Despite their relevance, most modern editions either do not reproduce all the illustrations or do so with poor detail.

- Vanity Fair: A Novel without a Hero, London: Bradbury & Evans, 1848 [ Wikisource ] [ Archive.org ].
- Vanity Fair: A Novel without a Hero, Vols. I, II, & III, Leipzig: Tauchnitz, 1848, reprinted 1925.
- Vanity Fair: A Novel without a Hero, London: Bradbury & Evans, 1853, without illustration.
- Vanity Fair: A Novel without a Hero, Vols. I, II, & III, New York: Harper & Bros., 1865.
- Vanity Fair: A Novel without a Hero, New York: Harper & Bros., 1869, reprinted 1898.
- Vanity Fair: A Novel without a Hero, London: Smith, Elder, & Co., 1883, reprinted 1886.
- Vanity Fair: A Novel without a Hero, Walter Scott, 1890.
- Vanity Fair: A Novel without a Hero, George Routledge & Sons, 1891.
- Vanity Fair: A Novel without a Hero, Vols. I & II, New York: Thomas Y. Crowell & Co., 1893, in four editions.
- Ritchie, Anne Isabella Thackeray, ed. (1898), The Works of William Makepeace Thackeray, Vol. I: Vanity Fair: A Novel without a Hero, London: Smith, Elder, & Co.
- Gwynn, Stephen, ed. (1899), Vanity Fair: A Novel without a Hero, Vols. I, II, & III, Methuen.
- Doyle, Richard, ed. (1902), Vanity Fair, Vols. I & II, New York: P.F. Collier & Son.
- Vanity Fair: A Novel without a Hero, New York: Thomas Nelson & Sons, 1906.
- Neilson, William Allan, ed. (1909), Vanity Fair, Vols. I & II, New York: P.F. Collier & Son, republished 1917.
- Tillotson, Geoffrey; et al., eds. (1963), Vanity Fair: A Novel without a Hero, Boston: Riverside.
- Page, Josephine, ed. (1964), Vanity Fair, Tales Retold for Easy Reading, Oxford: Oxford University Press, reprinted 1967, 1975, & 1976.
- Sutherland, John, ed. (1983), Vanity Fair: A Novel without a Hero, Oxford: Oxford University Press, ISBN 9780192834430.
- Zhang, Xinci, ed. (1992), 浮華世界 [Fuhua Shijie, Vanity Fair], Tainan: Daxia Chubanshe, reprinted 1995. (in Chinese)
- Shillingsburg, Peter, ed. (1994), Vanity Fair, New York: W.W. Norton & Co..
- Francis, Pauline, ed. (2000), Vanity Fair, Harlow: Pearson Education, reprinted 2008.
- Carey, John, ed. (2001), Vanity Fair: A Novel without a Hero, London: Penguin.
- Mowat, Diane, ed. (2002), Vanity Fair, Oxford: Oxford University Press, reprinted 2003, 2004, & 2008.
- Butler, James; et al., eds. (2004), Vanity Fair, Genoa: Black Cat.
- Walker, Elizabeth, ed. (2007), Vanity Fair, Oxford: Macmillan.
- Vanity Fair: A Novel without a Hero, Cambridge: Cambridge University Press, 2013, ISBN 9781108057059.
- Hui, Tang, ed. (2014), 名利场 [Mingli Chang, Vanity Fair], Beijing: Waiyu Jiaoxue yu Yanjiu Chubanshe. (in Chinese)

== Reception and criticism ==
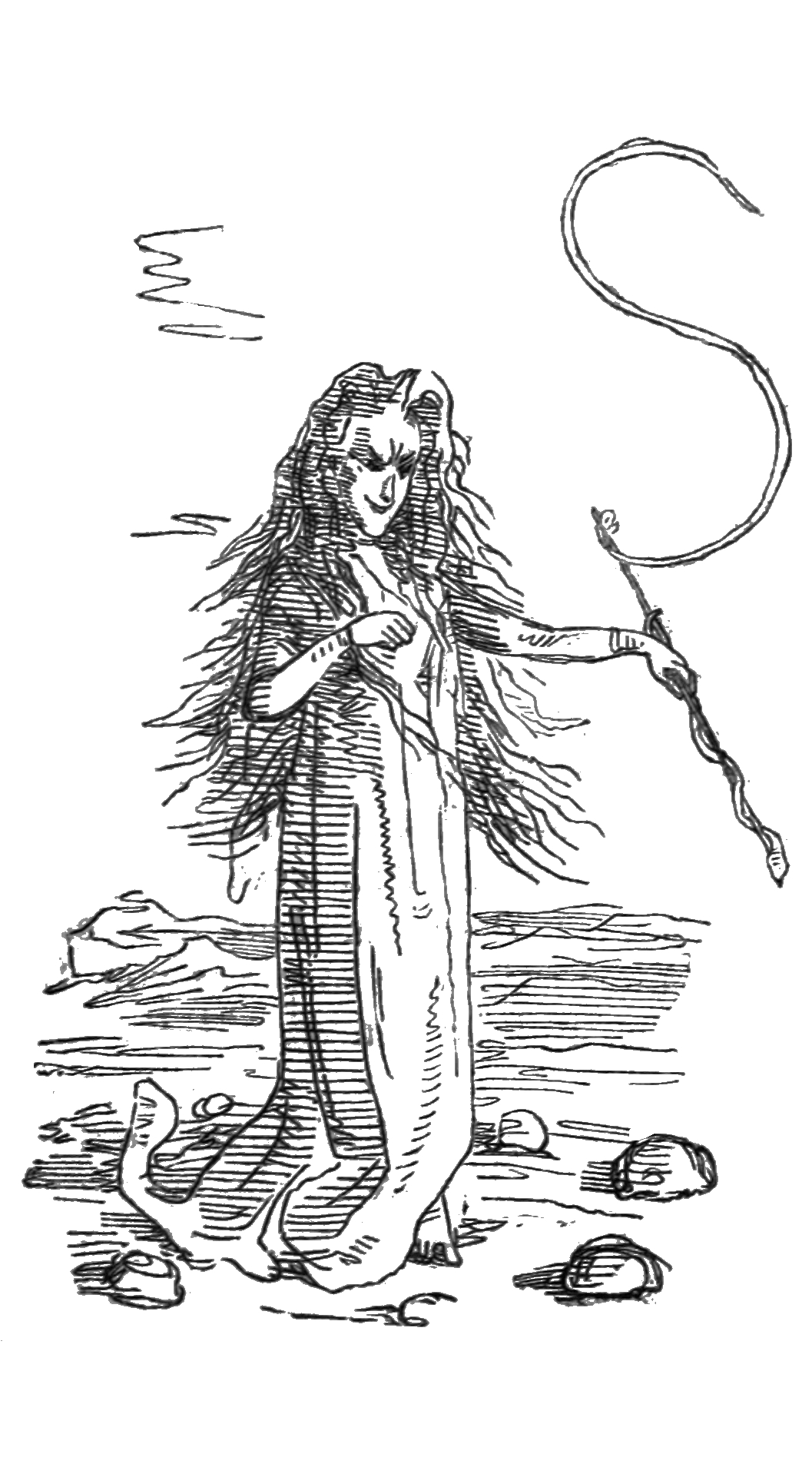
Becky as Circe, who turned Odysseus's men into swine.

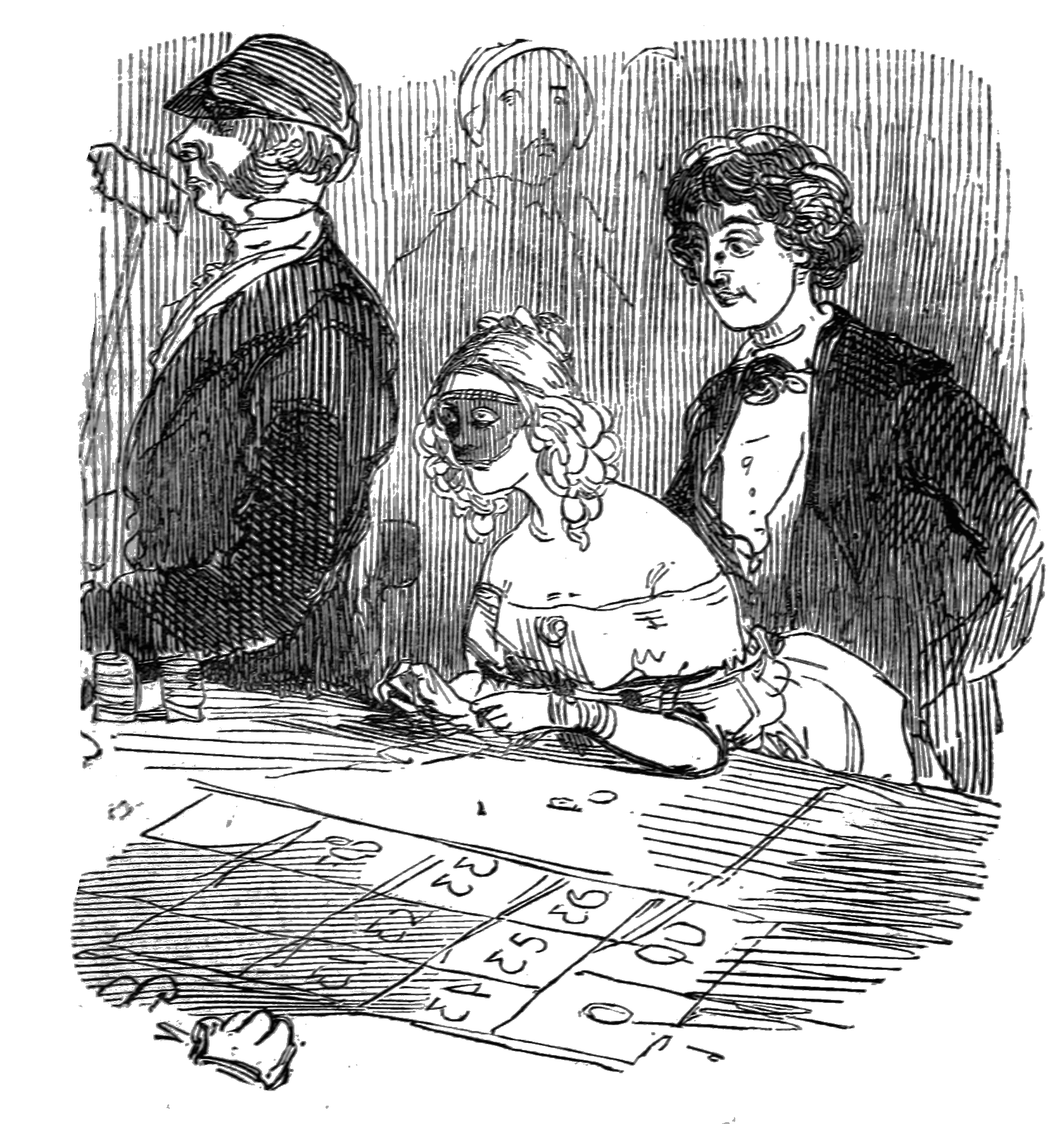
Becky in a domino mask, playing roulette on the Continent.

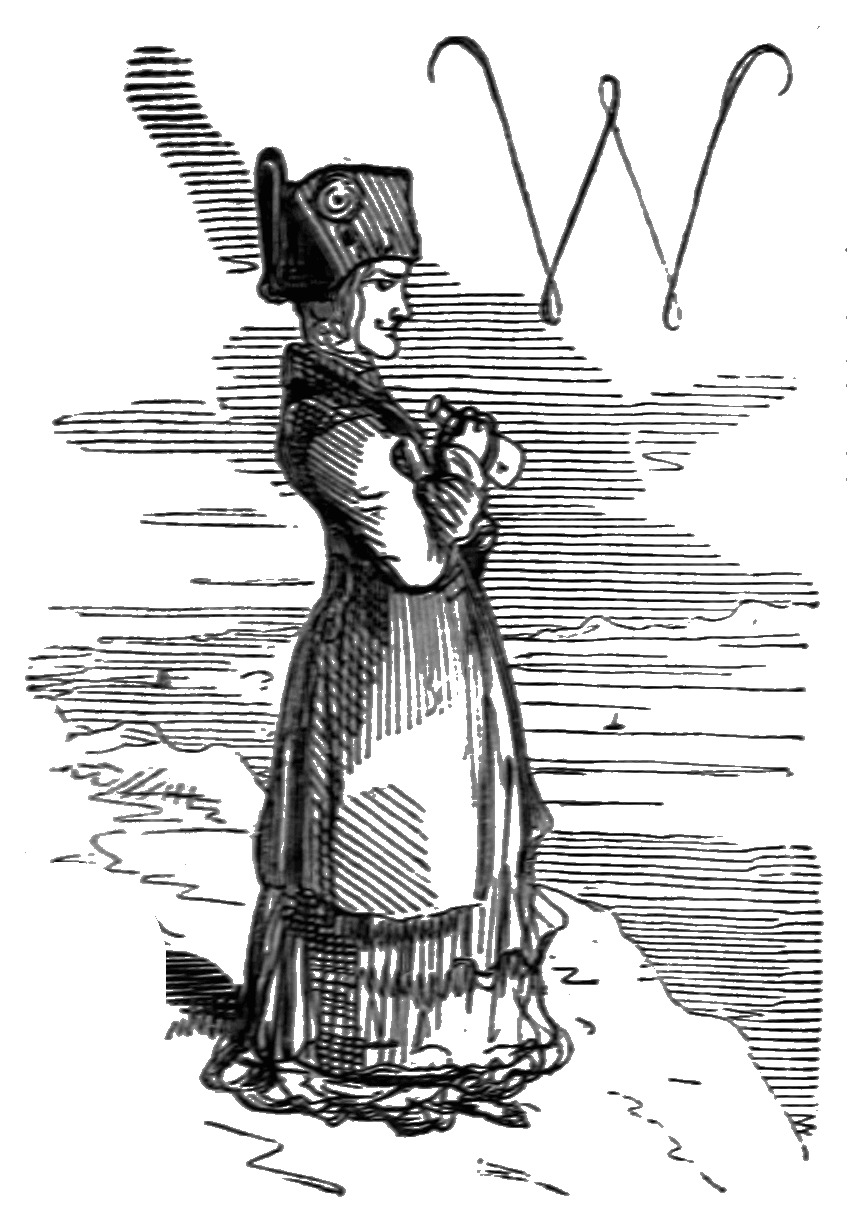
Becky as Napoleon, after various portraits both on Elba and St Helena.

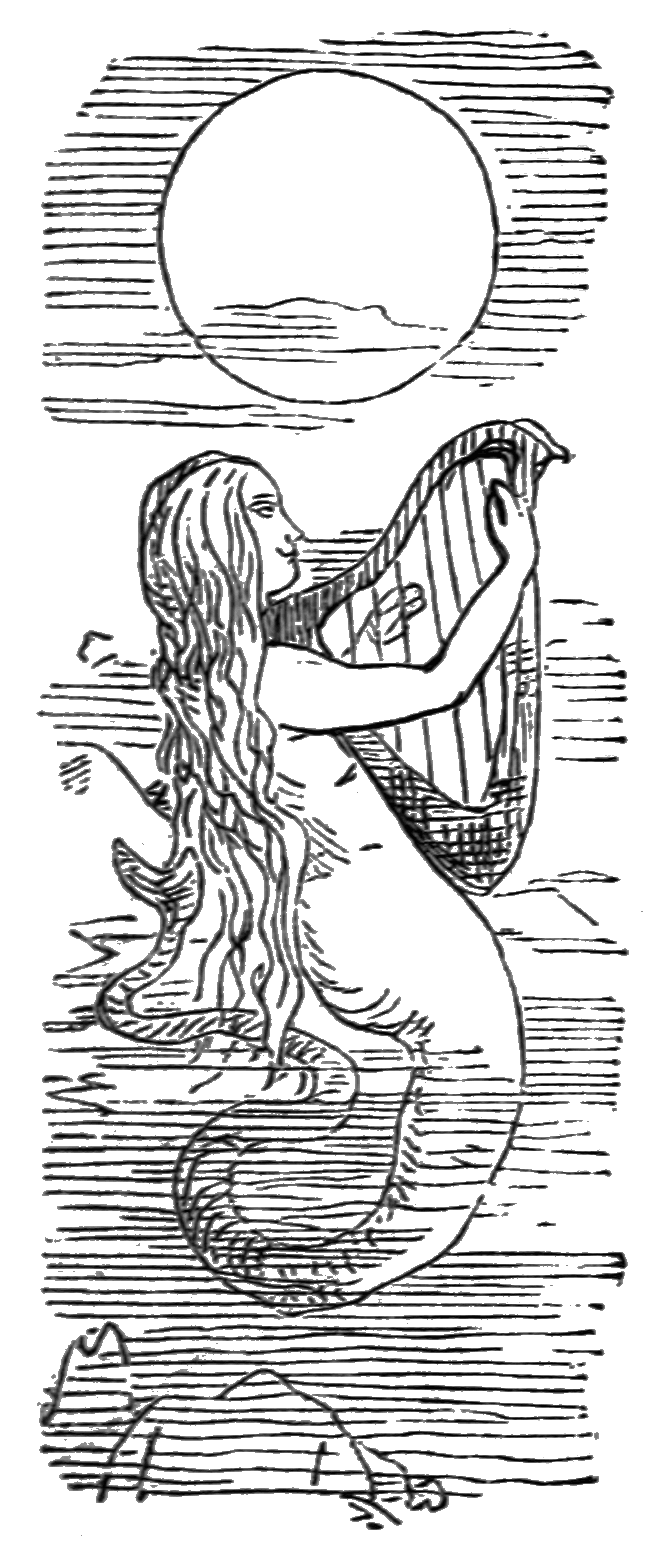
Becky as a mermaid, an image substantially developed by Thackeray in addressing the completeness of his narrative: "There are things we do and know perfectly well in Vanity Fair, though we never speak them... In describing this syren, singing and smiling, coaxing and cajoling, the author, with modest pride, asks his readers all around, has he once forgotten the laws of politeness, and showed the monster's hideous tale above water? No! Those who like may peep down under waves that are pretty transparent, and see it writhing and twirling, diabolically hideous and slimy, flapping amongst bones, or curling round corpses; but above the water-line, I ask, has not everything been proper, agreeable, and decorous...?"

=== Contemporaneous reception ===
The style is highly indebted to Henry Fielding. Thackeray meant the book to be not only entertaining but also instructive, an intention demonstrated through the book's narration and through Thackeray's private correspondence. A letter to his editor at Punch expressed his belief that "our profession... is as serious as the parson's own". He considered it his own coming-of-age as a writer (Note: To a German visitor who told him he had learned to read English from Vanity Fair, Thackeray replied "And that's where I learned to write it".) and his greatest work. Critics hailed the work as a literary treasure before the last part of the serial was published.

Thackeray's illustrations attracted comment, as they did throughout his career. Thackeray took some care over them: as a young man he had studied to be an artist in Paris, and had first attempted to break into the literary world by offering to serve as Dickens' illustrator. In her correspondence, Charlotte Brontë's reaction was effusive: "You will not easily find a second Thackeray. How he can render, with a few black lines and dots, shades of expression, so fine, so real; traits of character so minute, so subtle, so difficult to seize and fix, I cannot tell—I can only wonder and admire... If Truth were again a goddess, Thackeray should be her high priest." Anthony Trollope, like Brontë a friend and admirer of Thackery's, acknowledged their roughness but compared Thackeray to Hogarth. (Note: "He did illustrate his own books, and everyone knows how incorrect were his delineations. But as illustrations they were excellent... Like Hogarth, he could always make his pictures tell his story; though, unlike Hogarth, he had not learned to draw.")

The early reviewers took the debt to Bunyan as self-evident and compared Becky with Pilgrim and Thackeray with Faithful. Although they were superlative in their praise, some expressed disappointment at the unremittingly dark portrayal of human nature, fearing Thackeray had taken his dismal metaphor too far. In response to these critics, Thackeray explained that he saw people for the most part as "abominably foolish and selfish".

The unhappy ending was intended to inspire readers to look inward at their own shortcomings. Other critics took notice of or exception to the social subversion in the work; in his correspondence, Thackeray stated his criticism was not reserved to the upper class: "My object is to make every body engaged, engaged in the pursuit of Vanity Fair and I must carry my story through in this dreary minor key, with only occasional hints here and there of better things—of better things which it does not become me to preach".

=== Analysis ===
The novel is considered a classic of English literature, though some critics claim that it has structural problems; Thackeray sometimes lost track of the huge scope of his work, mixing up characters' names and minor plot details. The number of allusions and references it contains can make it difficult for modern readers to follow.

The subtitle, A Novel without a Hero, refers to the characters all being flawed to a greater or lesser degree; even the most sympathetic have weaknesses, for example Captain Dobbin, who is prone to awkwardness and melancholy. The human weaknesses Thackeray illustrates are mostly to do with greed, idleness, and snobbery, and the scheming, deceit and hypocrisy that mask them. None of the characters is wholly evil, although Becky's manipulative, amoral tendencies make her come pretty close. However, even Becky, who is amoral and cunning, is thrown on her own resources by poverty and its stigma. (She is the orphaned daughter of a poor artist and an opera dancer and "became a woman at eight.") Thackeray's tendency to highlight faults in all of his characters displays his desire for a greater level of realism in his fiction compared to the rather unlikely or idealised people in many contemporary novels of the day.

The novel is a satire of society as a whole, characterised by hypocrisy and opportunism, but it is not necessarily a reforming novel; there is no clear suggestion that social or political changes or greater piety and moral reformism could improve the nature of society. It thus paints a fairly bleak view of the human condition. This bleak portrait is continued with Thackeray's own role as an omniscient narrator, one of the writers best known for using the technique. He continually offers asides about his characters and compares them to actors and puppets, but his cheek goes even to his readers, accusing all who may be interested in such "Vanity Fairs" as being either "of a lazy, or a benevolent, or a sarcastic mood". As Lord David Cecil remarked, "Thackeray liked people, and for the most part he thought them well-intentioned. But he also saw very clearly that they were all in some degree weak and vain, self-absorbed and self-deceived." Amelia begins as a warm-hearted and friendly girl, though sentimental and naive, but by the story's end she is portrayed as vacuous and shallow. Dobbin appears first as loyal and magnanimous, if unaware of his own worth; by the end of the story he is presented as a tragic fool, a prisoner of his own sense of duty who knows he is wasting his gifts on Amelia but is unable to live without her. The novel's increasingly grim outlook can take readers aback, as characters whom the reader at first holds in sympathy are shown to be unworthy of such regard.

The work is often compared to the other great historical novel of the Napoleonic Wars, Tolstoy's War and Peace. (Note: Examples include Carey's Prodigal Genius and McAloon's defence of the work in The Telegraph.) While Tolstoy's work has a greater emphasis on the historical detail and the effect the war has upon his protagonists, Thackeray instead uses the conflict as a backdrop to the lives of his characters. The momentous events on the continent do not always have an equally important influence on the behaviours of Thackeray's characters. Rather their faults tend to compound over time. This is in contrast to the redemptive power the conflict has on the characters in War and Peace. For Thackeray, the Napoleonic Wars as a whole can be thought of as one more of the vanities expressed in the title.

A common critical topic is to address various objects in the book and the characters' relationships with them, such as Rebecca's diamonds or the piano Amelia values when she thinks it came from George and dismisses upon learning that Dobbin provided it. Marxist and similar schools of criticism go farther and see Thackeray as condemning consumerism and capitalism. However, while Thackeray is pointed in his criticism of the commodification of women in the marriage market, his variations on Ecclesiastes's "all is vanity" are often interpreted as personal rather than institutional. He also has broad sympathy with a measure of comfort and financial and physical "snugness". At one point, the narrator even makes a "robust defense of his lunch": "It is all vanity to be sure: but who will not own to liking a little of it? I should like to know what well-constituted mind, merely because it is transitory, dislikes roast-beef?"

Despite the clear implications of Thackeray's illustration on the topic, John Sutherland has argued against Becky having murdered Jos on the basis of Thackeray's criticism of the "Newgate novels" of Edward Bulwer-Lytton and other authors of Victorian crime fiction. (Note: The trio of lawyers Becky gets to defend herself from the claims—Burke, Thurtell, and Hayes—are named after prominent murderers of the time, although this may have been a tease or commentary on the legal profession itself.) Although what Thackeray principally objected to was the glorification of a criminal's deeds, his intent may have been to entrap the Victorian reader with their own prejudices and make them think the worst of Becky Sharp even when they have no proof of her actions.

== Adaptations ==
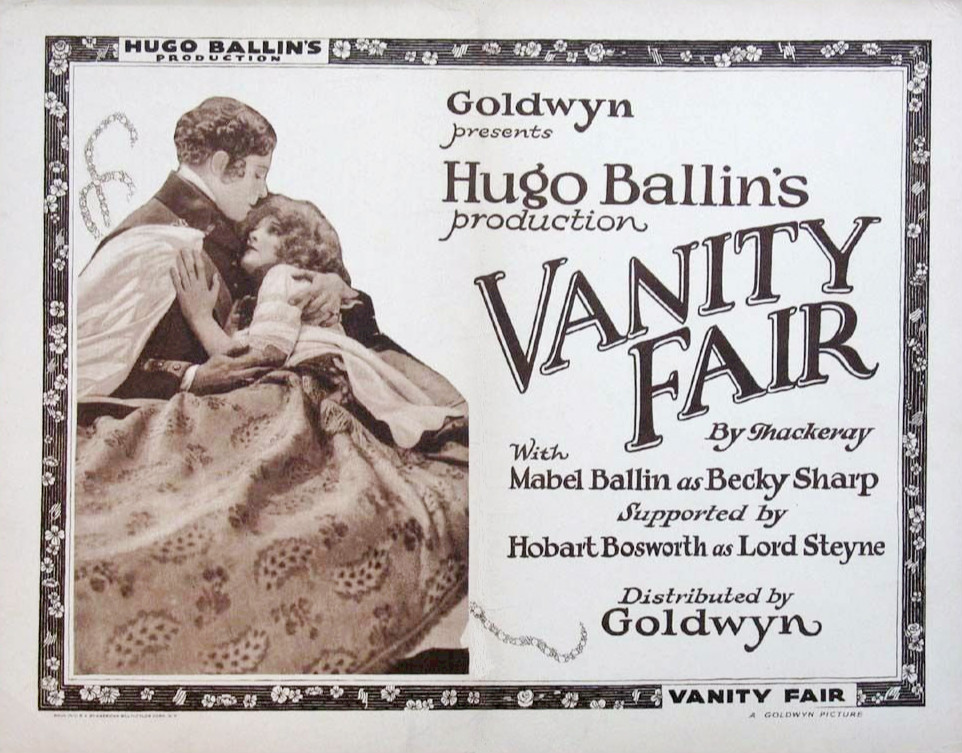
The lobby card for the 1923 Vanity Fair, a lost film whose Becky Sharp was the director's wife

Myrna Loy as an early 20th-century Becky Sharp in the 1932 Vanity Fair

Reese Witherspoon as the sympathetic Becky Sharp of the 2004 Vanity Fair

The book has inspired a number of adaptations:

=== Radio ===
- Vanity Fair (7 January 1940), the CBS Radio series Campbell Playhouse, hosted by Orson Welles, broadcast a one-hour adaptation featuring Helen Hayes and Agnes Moorehead.
- Vanity Fair (6 December 1947), the NBC Radio series Favorite Story, hosted by Ronald Colman, broadcast a half-hour adaptation with Joan Lorring as "Becky Sharp"
- Vanity Fair (2004), BBC Radio 4 broadcast an adaptation of the novel by Stephen Wyatt, starring Emma Fielding as Becky, Stephen Fry as the Narrator, Katy Cavanagh as Amelia, David Calder, Philip Fox, Jon Glover, Geoffrey Whitehead as Mr. Osborne, Ian Masters as Mr. Sedley, Alice Hart as Maria Osborne, and Margaret Tyzack as Miss Crawley; this was subsequently re-broadcast on BBC Radio 4 Extra in 20 fifteen-minute episodes.
- Vanity Fair (2019), BBC Radio 4 broadcast a three-part adaptation of the novel by Jim Poyser with additional material by Al Murray (Thackeray's actual descendant, who also stars as Thackeray), with Ellie White as Becky Sharp, Helen O'Hara as Amelia Sedley, Blake Ritson as Rawdon Crawley, Rupert Hill as George Osborne and Graeme Hawley as Dobbin.

=== Silent films ===
- Vanity Fair (1911), directed by Charles Kent
- Vanity Fair (1915), directed by Charles Brabin
- Vanity Fair (1922), directed by W. Courtney Rowden
- Vanity Fair (1923), directed by Hugo Ballin

=== Sound films ===
- Vanity Fair (1932), directed by Chester M. Franklin and starring Myrna Loy, updating the story to make Becky Sharp a social-climbing governess
- Becky Sharp (1935), starring Miriam Hopkins and Frances Dee, the first feature film shot in full-spectrum Technicolor
- Vanity Fair (2004), directed by Mira Nair and starring Reese Witherspoon as Becky Sharp and Natasha Little, who had played Becky Sharp in the earlier television miniseries of Vanity Fair, as Lady Jane Sheepshanks

=== Television ===
- Vanity Fair (1956-7), a BBC serial adapted by Constance Cox starring Joyce Redman
- Vanity Fair (1967), a BBC miniseries adapted by Rex Tucker starring Susan Hampshire as Becky Sharp, for which she received an Emmy Award in 1973. This version was also broadcast in 1972 in the US on PBS television as part of Masterpiece Theatre.
- Yarmarka tshcheslaviya (1976), a two-episode TV miniseries directed by Igor Ilyinsky and Mariette Myatt, staged by the Moscow State Academic Maly Theater of the USSR) (in Russian)
- Vanity Fair (1987), a BBC miniseries starring Eve Matheson as Becky Sharp, Rebecca Saire as Amelia Sedley, James Saxon as Jos Sedley and Simon Dormandy as Dobbin.
- Vanity Fair (1998), a BBC miniseries starring Natasha Little as Becky Sharp
- Vanity Fair (2018), a seven-part ITV and Amazon Studios adaptation, starring Olivia Cooke as Becky Sharp, Tom Bateman as Captain Rawdon Crawley, and Michael Palin as Thackeray.

=== Theatre ===
- Becky Sharp (1899), play written by Langdon Mitchell
- Becky Sharp (1924) play written by "Olive Conway", a pseudonym used by Harold Brighouse
- Vanity Fair (1946), play written by Constance Cox
- Vanity Fair (2017), play written by Kate Hamill
- Vanity (2023), musical written and composed by Bernard J. Taylor

=== Fiction ===
- The Confessions of Becky Sharp (2011), a novel written by David Lewis James
- The Rise and Fall of Becky Sharp (2018), a novel written by Sarra Manning
- Becky (2023), novel written by Sarah May
