= The Red City =

1909 novel by Silas Weir Mitchell

The Red City is a 1909 historical novel by the American writer Silas Weir Mitchell. The novel is set in Philadelphia in the 1790s, during the second term of George Washington's Presidency when the city served as the temporary capital of the United States. Its general theme is of the city's "greatness" during this era. The "red city" of the title is a reference to the red brick used for many of Philadelphia's public and private buildings in the eighteenth century.

The book depicts the Yellow Fever Epidemic of 1793, which engulfed the city.

== Bibliography ==
- Thomas George E., Cohen Jeffrey A. & Lewis, Michael J. Frank Furness: The Complete Works. Princeton Press, 1996.
