= Camille Zeckwer =

American pianist and composer

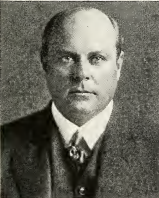
Camille Zeckwer

Camille Wolfgang Zeckwer (June 26, 1875–August 7, 1924) was an American pianist and composer.

== Biography ==
Zeckwer was born in Philadelphia, where his father Richard Zeckwer had founded the Philadelphia Musical Academy (now known as the University of the Arts). He graduated from the same Academy in 1893. Further study followed with Antonín Dvořák in New York City before he traveled to Berlin to study with Philipp Scharwenka, Ferdinand Hiller. and violin with Florián Zajíc. He then returned to Philadelphia and became an instructor at the Philadelphia Musical Academy.

Camille succeeded his father as Director upon the latter's 1917 retirement, and subsequently merged the Academy with Frederick Hahn's conservatory to become the Zeckwer-Hahn Philadelphia Musical Academy. He held this position until his 1924 death of complications following throat surgery in Southampton Long Island.

Like his father before him, Zeckwer was organist at Philadelphia's St. John the Evangelist Catholic Church. In 1909, philanthropist and musical arts patron Edwin Fleisher recruited Zeckwer to be the conductor of his newly formed amateur Symphony Club orchestra. In 1924 he was musical director of Philadelphia's Savoy Company.

As a composer Zeckwer was active mainly in smaller forms, producing many songs and chamber pieces; in larger forms he composed a symphonic poem, a piano concerto, an opera, and numerous cantatas. His compositions were performed by the major orchestras throughout the United States, including in Boston, Philadelphia, and Chicago.

== Selected Compositions ==
- Suite for violin and piano, Op. 1
- Violin Sonata No. 1, Op. 2
- Serenade, Op. 3 No. 1
- Caprice, Op. 3 No. 2
- String Quartet, Op. 4
- Piano Quintet, Op. 5
- Swedish Fantasy, Op. 6 for violin and orchestra
- Violin Sonata No. 2, Op. 7
- Piano Concerto in E minor, Op. 8 (premiered by the composer in Philadelphia in 1899)
- Piano Quartet, Op. 9
- Impatience, Etude Op. 19 No. 1
- Piano Pieces, Op. 21
- 3 Piano Pieces, Op. 25
- 3 Ballads of the Sea, Op. 30, for solo piano dedicated to Olga Samaroff
- The Mischianza, Op. 34, a secular cantata with libretto by Richard Beamish taken from Silas Weir Mitchell's novel Hugh Wynne, dedicated to Dr. Herbert J. Tily
- Piano Pieces, Op. 46
- Jade Butterflies, Op 50 an orchestral work after the poem by Louis Untermeyer. Unanimous winner of the 1922 competition by the Chicago North Shore Festival Association for the best orchestral work by an American. Premiered May 30, 1922 at the North Shore Festival final concert.
- Piano Pieces, Op. 96
- Sohrab and Rustum, symphonic poem (premiered in Philadelphia in 1915)
- Piano Trio "Serenade Melancolique"
- The Light of Asia, a retelling of the life of Buddha, incidental music for Christine Wetherill Stevenson's play composed with Charles Wakefield Cadman. Ran for 35 performances in 1918 at the Krotona Stadium, a forerunner of the Hollywood Bowl.
- The Shower, song
- Burst forth my soul, anthem which won Philadelphia's Manuscripts Music Society's 1916 prize for church music composition.
- The New Day, cantata
- Dawn, choral setting of Richard Watson Gilder's poem, prize-winning composition from Cleveland's Mendelssohn Club.
- Jane and Janetta, opera
- piano paraphrase of Strauss' Till Eulenspiegel
