= Becky Sharp (film) =

1935 film by Rouben Mamoulian, Lowell Sherman

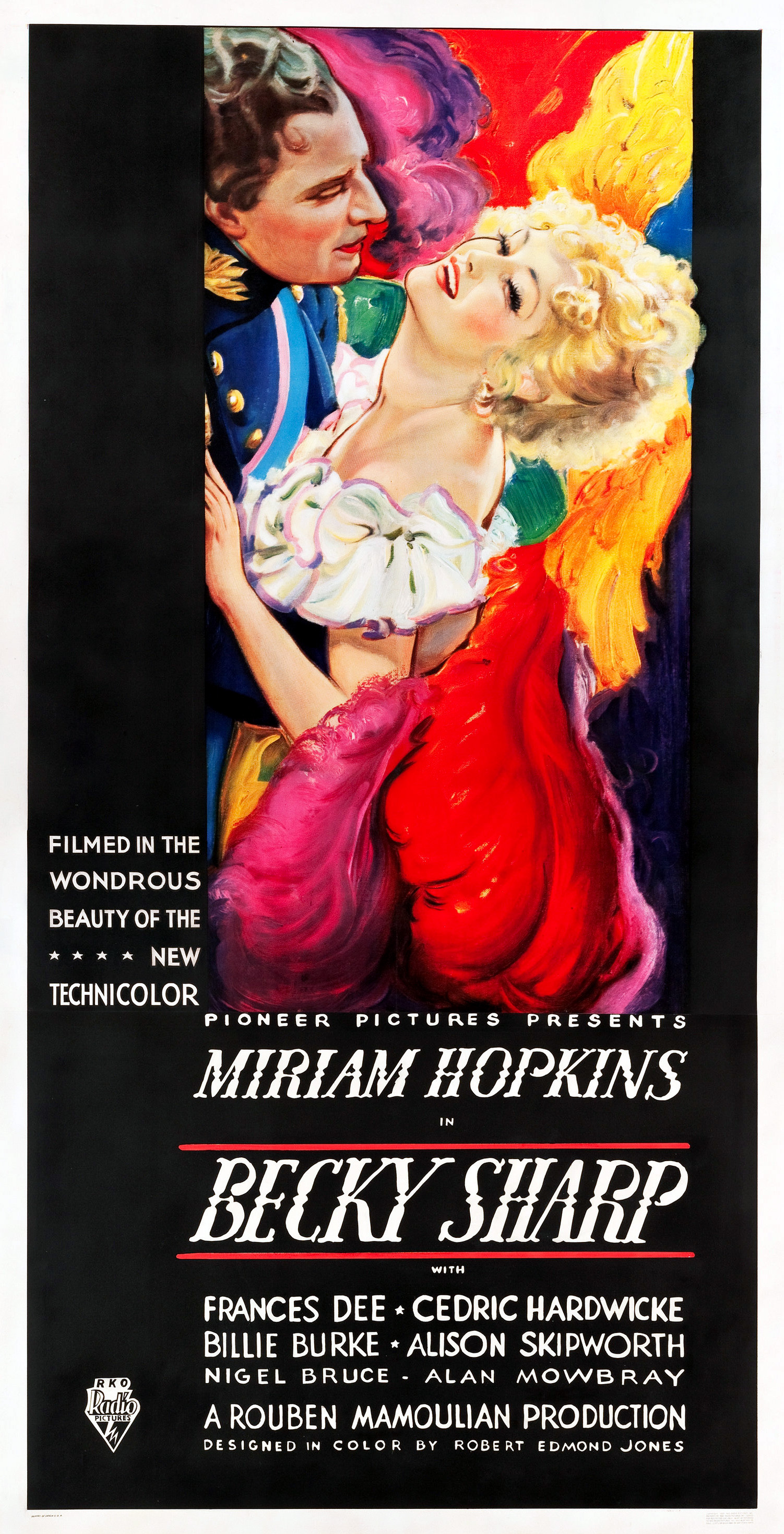
- Theatrical release poster
- Directed by: Rouben Mamoulian
- Screenplay by: Francis Edward Faragoh
- Story by: William Makepeace Thackeray; Langdon Mitchell
- Based on: Vanity Fair; 1848 novel by William Makepeace Thackeray
- Produced by: Kenneth Macgowan; Rouben Mamoulian; Robert Edmond Jones
- Starring: Miriam Hopkins; Frances Dee; Cedric Hardwicke
- Cinematography: Ray Rennahan
- Edited by: Archie Marshek
- Music by: Roy Webb William Faversham
- Color process: Three-strip Technicolor
- Production company: Pioneer Pictures
- Distributed by: RKO Radio Pictures
- Release date: June 13, 1935
- Running time: 84 minutes
- Country: United States
- Language: English

Full film

Becky Sharp is a 1935 American historical drama film directed by Rouben Mamoulian and starring Miriam Hopkins, who plays the eponymous protagonist. She was nominated for the Academy Award for Best Actress. Other supporting cast were William Faversham, Frances Dee, Cedric Hardwicke, Billie Burke, Alison Skipworth, Nigel Bruce, and Alan Mowbray.

The film is based on the 1899 play of the same name by Langdon Mitchell, which in turn was based on William Makepeace Thackeray's 1848 novel Vanity Fair. The film recounts the tale of a lower-class girl who insinuates herself into an upper-class family, only to see her life and the lives of those around her destroyed. The play was made famous in the late 1890s by actress Minnie Maddern Fiske. The screenplay was written by Francis Edward Faragoh.

The film was considered a landmark in cinema as the first feature film to use the newly developed three-strip Technicolor production throughout, opening the way for a growing number of color films to be made in Britain and the United States in the years leading up to World War II. Becky Sharp was, in effect, a "demonstration" picture, which served to showcase and validate this advanced technology in color.

In 2019, the film was selected by the Library of Congress for preservation in the United States National Film Registry for being "culturally, historically, or aesthetically significant".

== Plot ==
Becky Sharp, a socially ambitious young lady, manages to survive during the background years of Napoleon's defeat at Waterloo. Becky gradually climbs the British social ladder, overcoming poverty and class distinctions, through her best friend Amelia Sedley, praising any rich man who will listen.

In her efforts to advance herself, she manages to connect with a number of gentlemen: the Marquis of Steyne, Joseph Sedley, Rawdon Crawley, and George Osborne, the husband of Amelia.

She rises to the top of British society but becomes the scourge of the social circle, offending influential ladies such as Lady Bareacres.

Sharp falls into the humiliation of singing for her meals in a beer hall, but she never stays down for long. At the end, she cons her last man and finally lands Amelia's brother, Joseph.

== Cast ==
- Miriam Hopkins as Becky Sharp
- Frances Dee as Amelia Sedley
- Cedric Hardwicke as Marquis of Steyne
- Billie Burke as Lady Bareacres
- Alison Skipworth as Miss Crawley
- Nigel Bruce as Joseph Sedley
- Alan Mowbray as Rawdon Crawley
- G. P. Huntley Jr. as George Osborne
- William Stack as Pitt Crawley
- George Hassell as Sir Pitt Crawley
- William Faversham as Duke of Wellington
- Charles Richman as General Tufto
- Doris Lloyd as Duchess of Richmond
- Colin Tapley as William Dobbin
- Leonard Mudie as Tarquin
- May Beatty as Briggs
- Charles Coleman as Bowles
- Bunny Beatty as Lady Blanche
- Finis Barton as Miss Flowery
- Olaf Hytten as The Prince Regent
- Pauline Garon as Fifine
- James 'Hambone' Robinson as Sedley's page
- Elspeth Dudgeon as Miss Pinkerton
- Tempe Pigott as The Charwoman
- Ottola Nesmith as Lady Jane Crawley
- Creighton Hale as British Officer (uncredited)

== Production ==
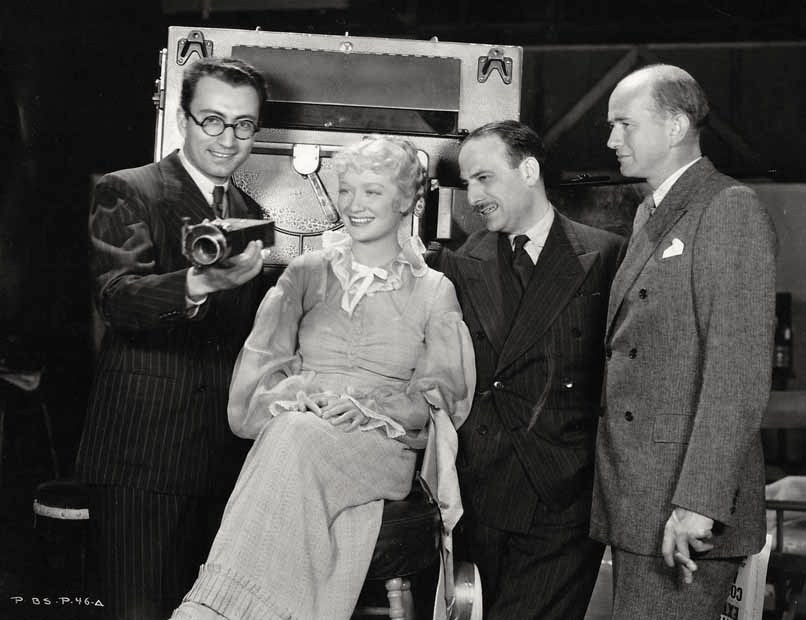
Rouben Mamoulian, Miriam Hopkins, visitor Michael Balcon, and Kenneth Macgowan on the set of Becky Sharp (1935)

John Hay "Jock" Whitney and Cornelius Vanderbilt Whitney formed Pioneer Pictures specifically to produce color films, and signed a contract to release Pioneer films through RKO Radio Pictures.

Original director Lowell Sherman began filming on December 3, 1934. The early Technicolor systems required massive lighting, which generated high temperatures on the set. Moving between the hot interior and cool winter temperatures outdoors, Sherman contracted pneumonia and died in late December. Rouben Mamoulian was immediately enlisted to take over as director. Sherman’s footage was retained, and Mamoulian shaped his subsequent Technicolor scenes based on the original script. Production on the film concluded on March 20, 1935.

=== Color development ===
Becky Sharp was the first feature film to use the three-strip Technicolor process, which created a separate film register for each of the three primary colors, for the entirety of the film.

Earlier live action films to use the new Technicolor process for part of the film include the final musical number in the feature The Cat and the Fiddle released by MGM in February 1934, and in short sequences filmed for other movies made during 1934, including The House of Rothschild (Twentieth Century Pictures/United Artists) with George Arliss and Kid Millions (Samuel Goldwyn/United Artists) with Eddie Cantor. Warner Brothers released two Leon Errol shorts, Service with a Smile (July 28, 1934) and Good Morning, Eve! (September 22, 1934), and RKO Pictures released the short La Cucaracha (August 31, 1934).

== Release ==
The film opened at Radio City Music Hall in New York on June 13, 1935. It also opened the same week at the Palace Theatre in Chicago. After its New York opening, it opened at other large key city situations within a week. The release was accompanied by augmented advertising campaigns.

== Reception ==
=== Critical reception ===
Based on 133 reviews in leading newspapers in the United States, none voiced opposition to the use of color. 117 predicted that color would be the next step in motion picture development.

Writing for The Spectator, Graham Greene raved that "colour is everything here" and characterizing its use in the film as "a triumph". Although Greene complained that the Technicolor "plays havoc with the women's faces", leveled criticism at Hopkins for her "indecisive acting", and noted that he had found the film's climax in Bath to be "absurd" and "silly", he described these minor complaints as "ungrateful" and his overall impression was that the film gave "delight to the eye".

=== Box office ===
Becky Sharp grossed $121,000 in its first week in Chicago and New York. Its grosses in key cities in the United States were consistently higher than average.

== Retrospective appraisal ==
“Mamoulian was fascinated by color…He saw in the color process another opportunity for innovations that would set a standard for the new technology...His interest lay in choosing color for psychological effect rather than mere realistic reproduction or decorative dividends. With the advent of color processing, particularly Technicolor processing—with its non-realistic, supersaturated color—Mamoulian could approach the film medium like a painter with a palette.” — Film historian Marc Spergel in Reinventing Reality: The Art and Life of Rouben Mamoulian (1993)

Film historian Tom Milne on the new technology in a feature film:

Becky Sharp is still a strikingly beautiful film, using color as delicately as Wedgwood china; and it may also lay a reasonable claim to being the first film to have used color throughout to dramatic rather than decorative ends.

=== The opening Waterloo “grand ball” sequence ===
This occurs at the estate of the Duchess of Richmond near the tiny Belgian village of Waterloo, as French emperor Napoleon Bonaparte approaches at the head of his army.

The Duchess is presiding over a grand ball, the guests members of the European ruling elite. The Duke of Wellington arrives and warns the complacent company that a military engagement with Napoleon is imminent. An ominous rumbling is heard in the distance. The guests hesitate, then continue to dance. A second rumble occurs, closer, then suddenly the windows burst open, and flashes of gunfire and cannon are seen. The color of the film changes from white, to green, to yellow, to red, then is drenched in scarlett as one of the bloodiest and socially significant battles in European history begins to unfold.

Director Rouben Mamoulian wrote in Picturegoer shortly after the film’s release: “Colour, as you know, is symbolic,” adding “It is a sequence in which dialogue is of no moment…the lighting as well as the costumes contrives to accentuate the mounting drama of the scene” culminating in “red all over the action.”

Milne adds: “The Waterloo sequence is the dramatic highlight of the film...elsewhere, color is used less ostentatiously but equally theatrically.”

== Awards and honors ==
Wins

- Venice Film Festival: Best Color Film, Rouben Mamoulian, 1935

Nominations

- Academy Awards: Best Actress in a Leading Role, Miriam Hopkins, 1935
- Venice Film Festival: Mussolini Cup, Rouben Mamoulian, 1935

== Preservation status ==
For many years, the original three-color Technicolor version of the film was not available for viewing, though a 16 millimeter version was available. This version had been printed (poorly) on two-color Cinecolor stock which did not accurately reproduce the colors of the original film. The smaller film gauge also resulted in a grainier, inferior image.

=== UCLA Film and Television Archive Restoration ===
Beginning in the 1980s, the UCLA Film and Television Archive restored the film, under the supervision of archivist Robert Gitt. Director Rouben Mamoulian appeared at the premiere of the restored print at the Academy of Motion Picture Arts and Sciences theatre in Beverly Hills.

Stage 1 was completed in 1984. For stage 2 (around 1988), Italian print elements, which allowed the picture on the last reel to be upgraded, while the somewhat splicey English soundtrack, were edited to fit the Italian print material. For stage 3, completed in 2002, a print was obtained from the Netherlands that allowed improvement in both picture and sound quality.

== See also ==
- List of early color feature films
- List of films in the public domain in the United States
