= John Kearsley Mitchell =

American writer and physician (1798–1858)

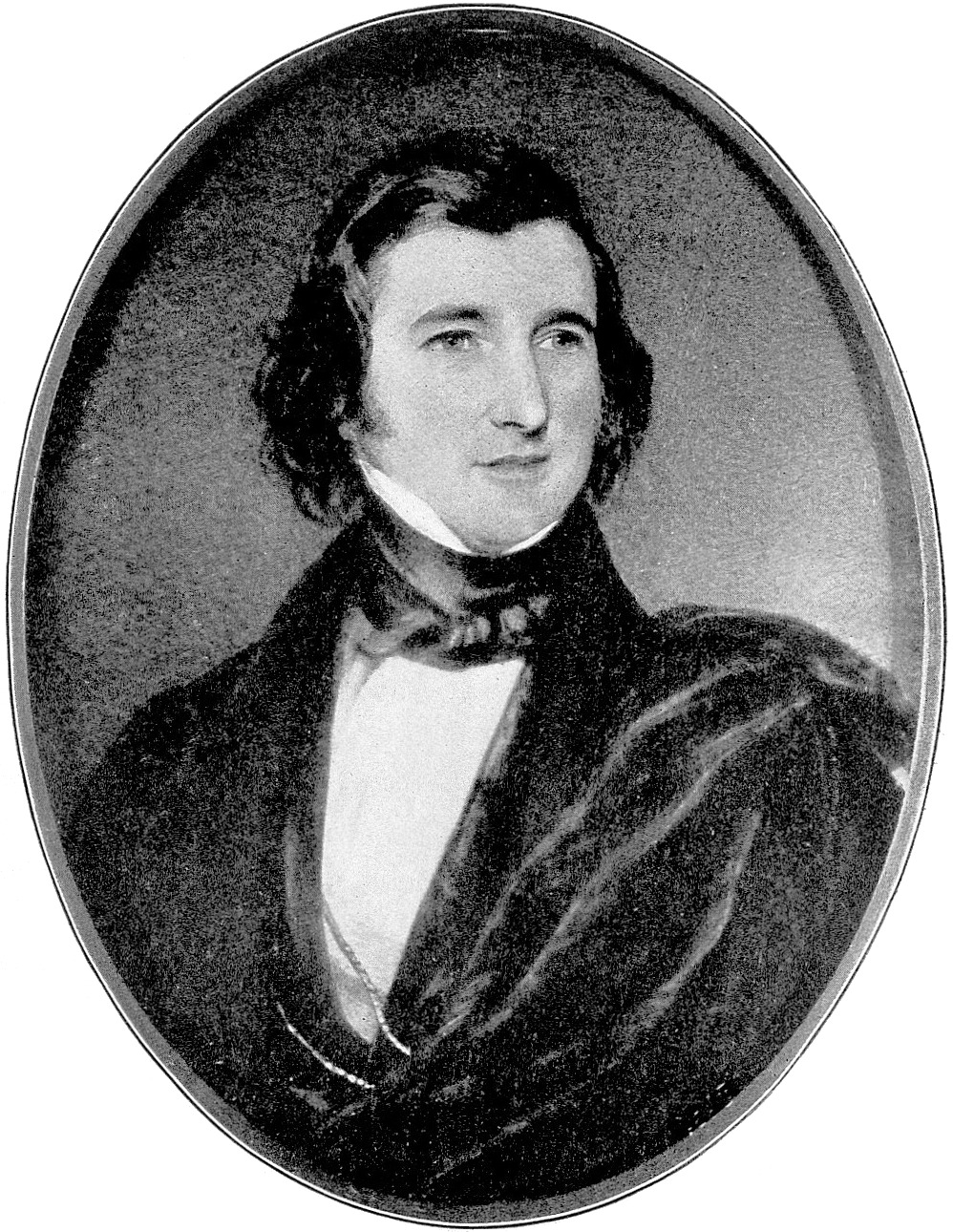
- Born: May 12, 1798; Shepherdstown, West Virginia, U.S.
- Died: April 4, 1858 (aged 59); Philadelphia, Pennsylvania
- Education: University of Pennsylvania School of Medicine
- Known for: Medical and chemistry research
- Children: Silas Weir Mitchell

John Kearsley Mitchell (May 12, 1798 – April 4, 1858) was an American medical doctor and writer, born in Shepherdstown, Virginia (present-day West Virginia). Orphaned at the age of eight, and sent to his late father's family in Scotland at the age of thirteen, Kearsley was educated at Ayr Academy and the University of Edinburgh.

He returned to the United States in 1814, and began studying medicine under Samuel Powel Griffitts (apprenticeship was a common method of medical education in this period) before enrolling at an institution for his medical education. He graduated from the University of Pennsylvania School of Medicine in 1819. Before he went to Philadelphia to practice his profession, he made three voyages to East Asia as ship's surgeon.

In 1826 he became professor of medicine and physiology at the Philadelphia Medical Institute and in 1833 professor of chemistry at the Franklin Institute. In 1827, Mitchell was elected to the American Philosophical Society. From 1841 to 1858, he was professor of the theory and practice of medicine at Jefferson Medical College. Mitchell was a freemason and served as grand master of the Grand Lodge of Pennsylvania in 1858.

He was also the father of American physician and writer Silas Weir Mitchell (February 15, 1829 – January 4, 1914).

== Works ==
- St. Helena (1821), a poem
- On the Penetratieness of Fluids (AJMS, Nov. 1830)
- On the Wisdom, Goodness and Power of God as Illustrated in the Properties of Water (1834)
- Indecision, a Tale of the Far West, and Other Poems (1839)
- On the Cryptogamous Origin of Malarious and Epidemic Fevers (1849)
- Five Essays on Various Chemical and Medical Subjects (1858), published posthumously by his son S. Weir Mitchell.
- The Value of a Great Medical Reputation: With Suggestions for Its Attainment: A Lecture, Introductory to the Summer Course of the Medical Institute (1834),

== Sources ==
- Edgar Allan Poe Society of Baltimore
- The value of a great medical reputation : with suggestions for its attainment : a lecture, introductory to the summer course of the medical institute
- American Biography Online
