= Becky Sharp (play) =

Becky Sharp is a play in four acts by Langdon Elwyn Mitchell. The work is based on William Makepeace Thackeray's novel Vanity Fair (1847–1848) and is named for the novel's main character, Becky Sharp. It was first staged on Broadway at the Fifth Avenue Theatre where it opened on September 12, 1899, in a production starring Minnie Maddern Fiske in the title part. It ran for 116 performances. Fiske also co-directed this production with Fred Williams, and Gates and Morange designed the sets for this show. The play was subsequently revived on Broadway three times with stagings at the Manhattan Theatre (1904), Lyceum Theatre (1911), and the Knickerbocker Theatre (1929). It was the basis for the 1935 film Becky Sharp.
