= Richard Zeckwer =

American composer and music teacher

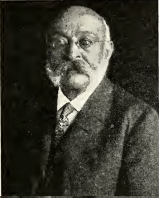
Richard Zeckwer

Richard Zeckwer (April 30, 1850 – December 31, 1922) was a composer and music teacher.

== Biography ==
He was born in Stendal and studied at the Felix Mendelssohn College of Music and Theatre, where he studied piano under Ignaz Moscheles before moving to Philadelphia, where he died. His compositions include The Bride of Messina overture and The Festival Overture. From 1876 to 1917 he was the director of the Philadelphia Musical Academy in Philadelphia, Pennsylvania.

Zeckwer's son, Camille, was also a composer and music educator in Philadelphia.
