= Silas Weir Mitchell (physician) =

American physician (1829–1914)

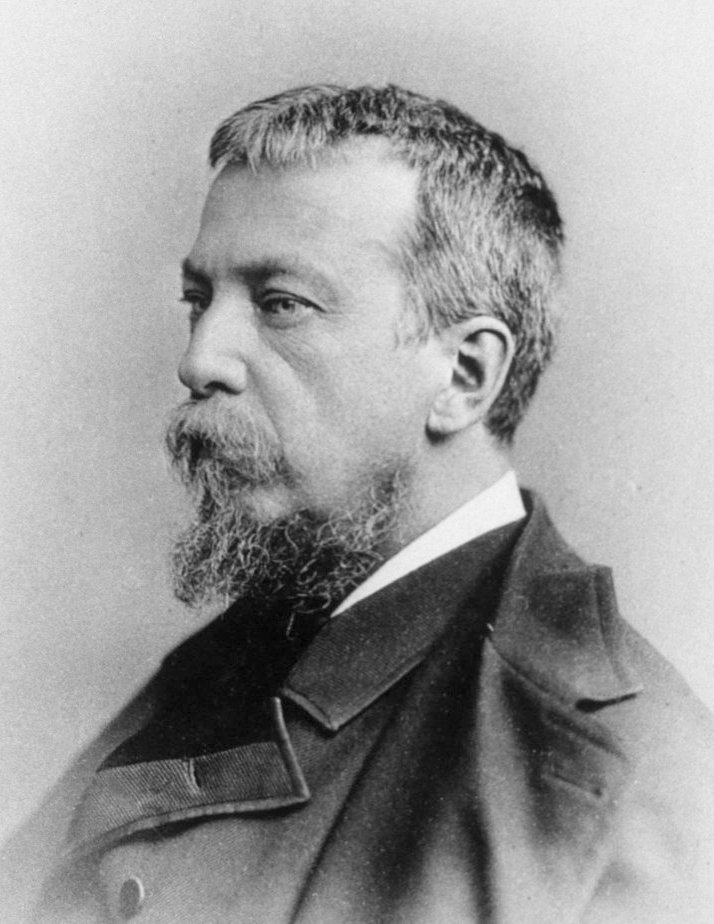
- Mitchell in 1881
- Born: February 15, 1829; Philadelphia, Pennsylvania, US
- Died: January 4, 1914 (aged 84); Philadelphia, Pennsylvania, US
- Education: University of Pennsylvania, Jefferson Medical College
- Known for: neurology research
- Spouse: Mary Cadwalader
- Relatives: Silas Weir Mitchell (descendant)

Silas Weir Mitchell (February 15, 1829 – January 4, 1914) was an American physician, scientist, novelist, and poet. He is considered the father of medical neurology, and he discovered causalgia (complex regional pain syndrome) and erythromelalgia, and pioneered the rest cure.

Many of Mitchell's theories were rooted in the Victorian belief that women's brains were fragile and ill-suited to modern education and intellectual strain. He believed that women who attempted to overstep their "natural limits" suffered from nervous exhaustion. While Mitchell made groundbreaking contributions to mainstream neurology, his approach to women's mental health is widely criticized today as medical misogyny.

== Early life ==
Silas Weir Mitchell was born on February 15, 1829, in Philadelphia, Pennsylvania, to prominent physician and writer John Kearsley Mitchell (1792–1858) and Sarah Henry Mitchell (1800–1872). His father was a doctor and pathologist interested in snake venom, and Mitchell would continue his research later on.

Dr. Mitchell studied at the University of Pennsylvania and later earned the degree of MD at the city's Jefferson Medical College in 1850.

== Career ==
During the Civil War, he was director of treatment of nervous injuries and maladies at Turner's Lane Hospital, Philadelphia, and at the close of the war became a specialist in neurology.

In this field Mitchell pioneered the rest cure for diseases now termed "psychiatric", particularly neurasthenia and hysteria, subsequently taken up by the medical world. The treatment consisted primarily in isolation, confinement to bed, dieting, electrotherapy and massage; and was popularly known as 'Dr Diet and Dr Quiet'. Mitchell also urged his female patients not to pursue an education or a career, which did not sit well with some of his patients. Mitchell advocated a high-fat diet to his patients. He believed that a diet rich in fat would "fatten and redden" his patients, leading to a cure. To achieve this, large quantities of milk were prescribed. He requested his patients to consume two quarts - 1.7 imperial quarts; 1.9 liters - or more milk a day.

His medical texts include Injuries of Nerves and Their Consequences (1872) and Fat and Blood (1877). Mitchell's disease (erythromelalgia) is named after him. He also coined the term phantom limb during his study of an amputee. Mitchell discovered and treated causalgia (today known as CRPS/RSD), a condition most often encountered by hand surgeons. Mitchell is considered the father of medical neurology and a pioneer of "evidence-based" or "scientific" medicine. He was a founding member of the American Anthropometric Society whose purpose was to collect the brains of eminent scientists to further brain science. He was also a psychiatrist, toxicologist, author, poet, and celebrity in Europe as well as America. His contemporaries considered him a genius no less than Benjamin Franklin.

In 1866, he published a short story in the Atlantic Monthly resting upon both somatic and psychological insights entitled "The Case of George Dedlow". From that point onward, Mitchell divided his attention between scientific and literary pursuits. In the former field, he produced monographs on rattlesnake venom, intellectual hygiene, injuries to the nerves, neurasthenia, nervous diseases of women, the effects of gunshot wounds upon the nervous system, and relations between nurse, physician, and patient; in the latter, he wrote juvenile stories, several volumes of respectable verse (The Hill of Stones and Other Poems was published in 1883 by Houghton, Mifflin and Co.), and prose fiction of varying merit, which earned him a leading place among American authors at the close of the 19th century. His historical novels in particular, notably Hugh Wynne (1897), The Adventures of François (1898), The Youth of Washington (1904), and The Red City (1909), are among the best of their genre.

He would become a professor at University of Pennsylvania. In addition to that, Mitchell was president of the College of Physicians of Philadelphia. He would mentor Hideyo Noguchi, helping him get his start in Philadelphia, and co-author papers together on snake venom and toxicity for the University of Pennsylvania's medical journal.

=== Prominent patients ===
Although Silas Weir Mitchell was considered the most prominent doctor of the time, some of his female patients suffered under his care. Writer Charlotte Perkins Gilman was under his care in 1887, but the rest cure did little to ease suffering and triggered a nervous breakdown after her release. Her experience provided her with the idea for "The Yellow Wallpaper", a short story in which the narrator is driven insane by this treatment. In her autobiography, she states that the purpose of her story was to reach Silas Weir Mitchell and convince him of the error of his ways.

His treatment was also used on Virginia Woolf, who wrote a savage satire of it in her novel Mrs. Dalloway (1925): "you invoke proportion; order rest in bed; rest in solitude; silence and rest; rest without friends, without books, without messages; six months rest; until a man who went in weighing seven stone six comes out weighing twelve".

=== Influence on Freud ===
Sigmund Freud reviewed Mitchell's book on The Treatment of Certain Forms of Neurasthenia and Hysteria in 1887; and used electrotherapy in his work into the 1890s.

Freud also adopted Mitchell's use of physical relaxation as an adjunct to therapy, which arguably led to the institutionalization of the psychoanalytic couch.

=== Honors and recognition ===
Mitchell's eminence in science and letters was recognized by honorary degrees conferred upon him by several universities at home and abroad and by membership, honorary or active, in many American and foreign learned societies. In 1887 he was president of the Association of American Physicians and in 1908–09 president of the American Neurological Association.

He was a trustee of the Carnegie Institution from 1902 until he died in 1914. In 1912 he was honored by the Guggenheim Honor Cup of the Penn Club of New York.

The American Academy of Neurology award for young researchers, the S. Weir Mitchell Award, is named for him.

Crotalus mitchellii, the speckled rattlesnake, was named after Mitchell.

== Personal life ==
Mitchell was twice married. His first marriage was to Mary Middleton Elwyn (1838–1862), a daughter of Dr. Alfred L. Elwyn of Philadelphia. Before her death, they were the parents of two children:

- John Kearsley Mitchell (1859–1917), a neurologist who married Anne Keppele Williams in 1890.
- Langdon Elwyn Mitchell (1862–1935), a playwright who married actress Marion Lea in 1891.

On June 23, 1875, Mitchell was married to Mary Cadwalader (1835–1914), who was from one of Philadelphia's most prestigious families. She was a daughter of Thomas McCall Cadwalader and Maria Charlotte Gouverneur (niece of Elizabeth Kortright, who had married U.S. President James Monroe). The marriage "propelled him to one of the city's highest social circles and he became a trustee of the University of Pennsylvania the following year." Together, they were the parents of a daughter:

- Marie Gouverneur Cadwalader Mitchell (1876–1898), who died unmarried.

Mitchell died on January 4, 1914, in Philadelphia and is interred at The Woodlands Cemetery. His widow died a week after his funeral.

=== Cultural club founder ===
Mitchell and 8 other members of the University Club at Penn founded The Franklin Inn Club in 1902.

=== Art patron ===
He was a friend and patron of the artist Thomas Eakins, and owned the painting Whistling for Plover. The Philadelphia Chippendale chairs seen in several Eakins paintings – such as William Rush Carving his Allegorical Figure of Schuylkill River (1877) and the bas-relief Knitting (1883) – were borrowed from Mitchell. Following Eakins's 1886 forced resignation from the Pennsylvania Academy of the Fine Arts, Mitchell may have recommended the artist's trip to the Badlands of South Dakota.

The artist John Singer Sargent painted two portraits of Mitchell: one is in the collection of the College of Physicians of Philadelphia; the other, commissioned by the Mutual Assurance Company of Philadelphia in 1902, was recently sold (see External Links, below).

The sculptor Augustus Saint-Gaudens modeled an 1884 bronze portrait plaque of Mitchell. Mitchell commissioned Saint-Gaudens to create a monument to his deceased daughter Maria: The Angel of Purity, a white marble version of the sculptor's Amor Caritas. Originally installed in Saint Stephen's Church, Philadelphia, it is now at the Philadelphia Museum of Art.

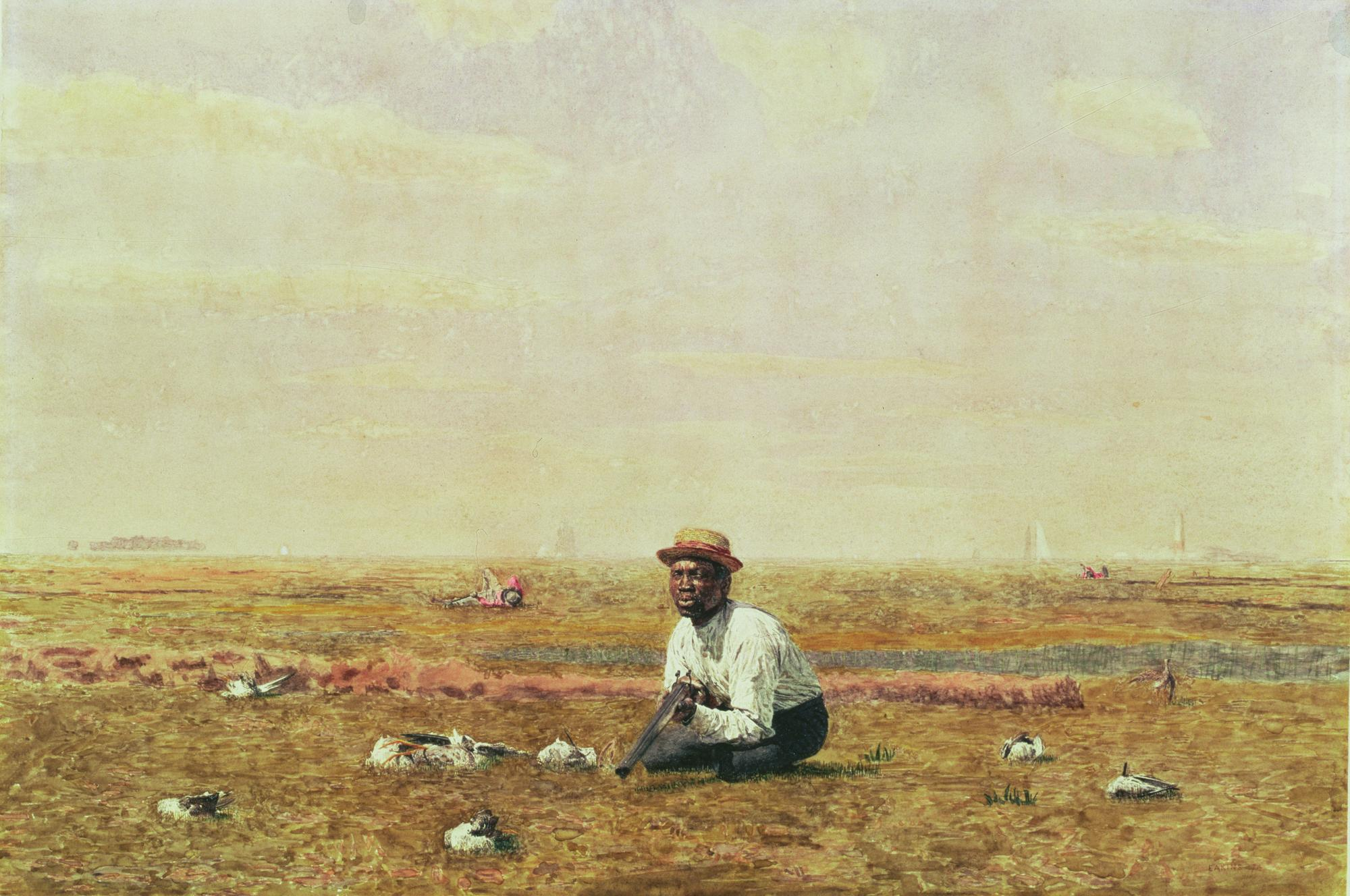
^{Brooklyn Museum}
Whistling for Plover (1874)
by Thomas Eakins.

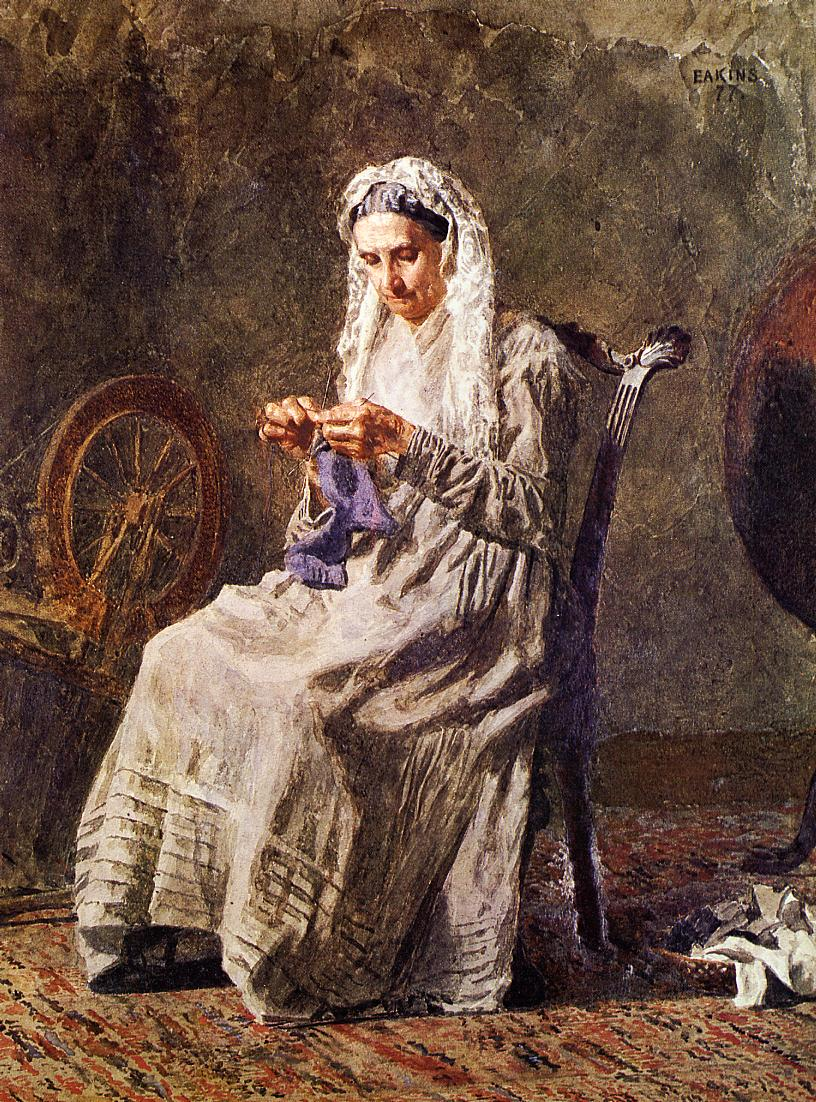
^{Princeton University}
Seventy Years Ago (1877)
by Thomas Eakins.

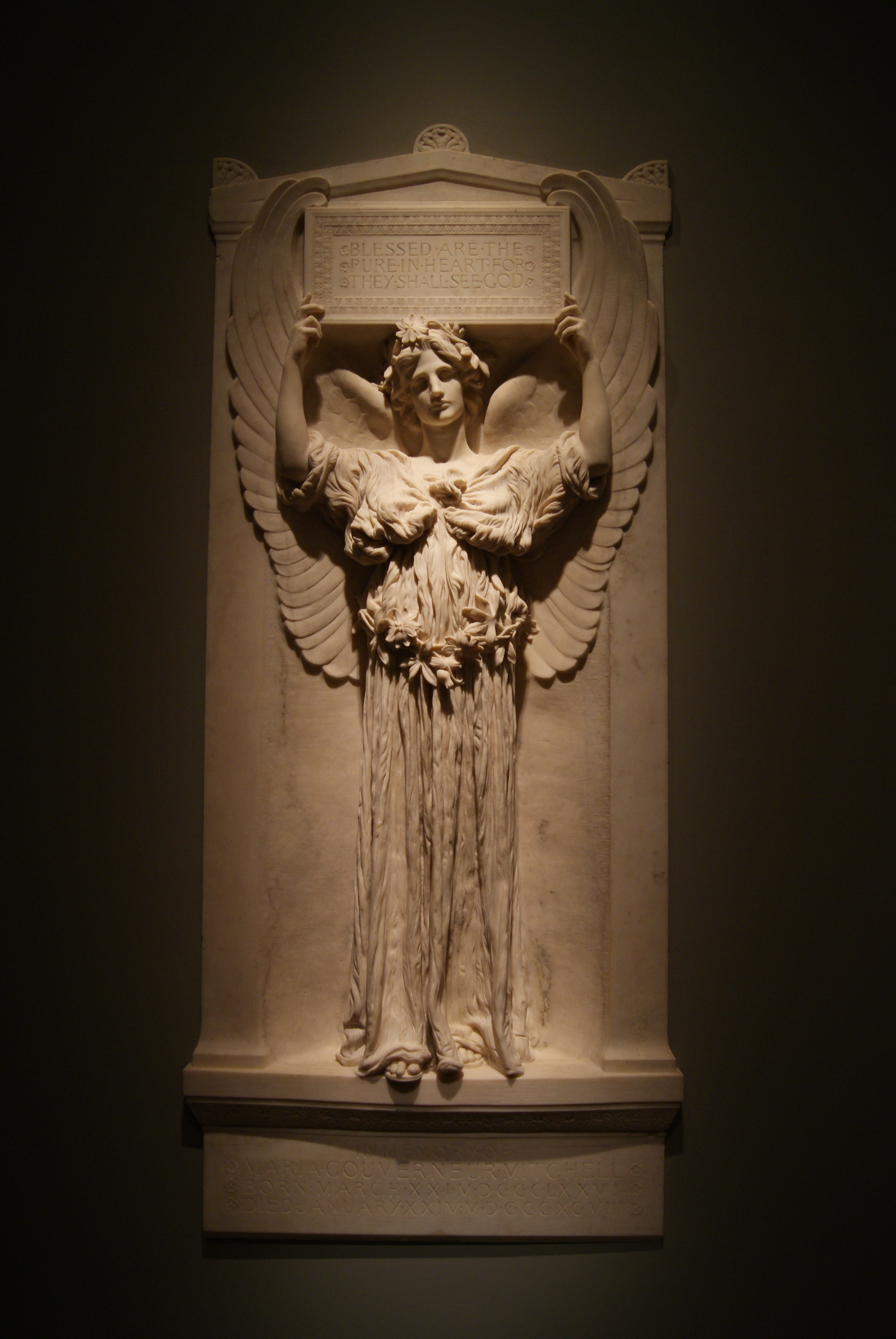
^{Philadelphia Museum of Art}
The Angel of Purity (1902)
by Augustus Saint-Gaudens.

=== Ghost story ===
Some time during the late 1800s, a ghost story was published about Dr. Mitchell that he was never able to lay to rest. The story tells how a very young girl in rags and threadbare shawl came to his door in bad weather and begged him to come take care of her sick mother. The girl guided Mitchell to the sick woman, who turned out to be a former house servant of his who was suffering from pneumonia. Mitchell helped the woman, then congratulated her on having such a fine daughter, but the woman told him her daughter died a month earlier. In a cupboard, Mitchell found the shawl the girl had been wearing; it had not been worn out that night.

A 2011 study determined that the ghost story was likely originally told by Mitchell himself as entertainment at a medical meeting, then took on a life of its own. In his 1910 book Characteristics, Mitchell wrote about a man who told a story "about a little dead child who rang up a doctor one night, and took him to see her dying mother;" the man was then constantly bothered by believers and disbelievers, and unable to stop the story. In context, it seems that Mitchell was referring to himself.

=== "The Yellow Wallpaper" ===
Charlotte Perkins Gilman would claim her short story "The Yellow Wallpaper" was directed at Weir Mitchell that he might reconsider the Rest Cure or change his treatments. Although she has claimed to have sent a copy of the story, Weir Mitchell never acknowledged his connection to the infamous story or that he ever received a copy. Perkins Gilman also claimed that Weir Mitchell altered his Rest Cure treatment after reading "The Yellow Wallpaper".

=== Disclosure of the Mechanical Turk's secret ===
Mitchell's father, John Mitchell, was the final owner of the Mechanical Turk, a chess-playing "automaton" built in 1770 that secretly contained a human chess player. After the Turk burned in a fire in 1854, Silas Weir Mitchell no longer saw any point in keeping the Turk's secret, and published an article in 1857 detailing the workings of the Turk and its human player.

== Terms ==
- Weir Mitchell skin – a red, glossy, perspiring skin seen in cases of incomplete irritative lesion of a nerve
- Weir Mitchell treatment – a method of treating neurasthenia, hysteria, etc., by absolute bed rest (aka a rest cure), frequent and abundant feeding, and the systematic use of massage and electricity
- Mitchell's disease – erythromelalgia

Dorland's Medical Dictionary (1938)

== Selected publications ==
- Rest in the Treatment of Nervous Disease (1875)
- Fat and Blood: And How to Make Them (1877)
- Fat and Blood: An Essay on the Treatment of Certain Forms of Neurasthenia and Hysteria (1884)
- Mitchell, S. Weir and Edward T. Reichert. 1886. Researches upon the Venoms of Poisonous Serpents. Smithsonian Contributions to Knowledge, Number 647. The Smithsonian Institution. Washington, District of Columbia. 179 pp.
- "Characteristics" by S. Weir Mitchell, 1910 The Century Co., New York, NY, USA.
- "Circumstance" by S. Weir Mitchell, MD. LL.D. Harvard and Edinburgh. Published 1902 by The Century Co.
- The Autobiography of a Quack and other stories by S. Weir Mitchell, M.D. printed 1903
