= Parvenu =

Relative newcomer to a socioeconomic class

The term parvenu is a derisive, contemptuous label used to belittle and demean someone. It is referred to a person who is a relative newcomer to a high-ranking socioeconomic class. The word is borrowed from the French language; it is the past participle of the verb parvenir (to reach, to arrive, to manage to do something).

The Oxford English Dictionary defines a parvenu as: "A person from a humble background who has rapidly gained wealth or an influential social position; a nouveau riche; an upstart, a social climber. Also in extended use. Generally used with the implication that the person concerned is unsuited to the new social position, esp. through lacking the necessary manners or accomplishments."

However the term is not limited to the nouveau riche: it can also describe a first-generation intellectual from a lower social background family, who rises through education and specialised knowledge rather than wealth, or who gains institutional power by moving into a leading position within a field.

The term designates individuals not socially accepted by individuals already established in their new class. It expresses a form of classism.

A social climber is a derogatory term that denotes someone who seeks social prominence through aggressive, fawning, or obsequious behavior. The term is sometimes used as synonymous with parvenu, and may be used as an insult, suggesting a poor work ethic or disloyalty to roots. Another synonym, with negative connotations, is arriviste.

== Examples ==
=== Royalty ===
Established royal families of Europe regarded the Bonaparte family as parvenu royalty. Napoleon III tried to marry into Swedish and German royalty, but was unsuccessful because he was a parvenu. For instance, his plan to marry Anna Pavlovna, one of the sisters of the Emperor Alexander, did not push through because the Empress Mother objected to the union on account of Napoleon's status as a parvenu. The reason given for the misalliance was difference of religion.

This was also said to be the case with the marriage of Egyptian Princess Fawzia to the future Shah of Iran, Mohammad Reza Pahlavi. One of the reasons speculated for their divorce is that Fawzia's family, including King Farouk I, viewed the Pahlavis as parvenus. Though the Muhammad Ali dynasty of Egypt and Sudan, to which Fawzia belonged, had humble beginnings, it had solidified its status in Egypt and the Arab World since 1805. In contrast, the Pahlavis were a far more recent dynasty, owing their position entirely to the coup d'état of Mohammad Reza Pahlavi's father, Reza Khan, in 1921.

=== In France ===
In the 19th century, the French aristocracy viewed Jewish women who converted to Christianity upon marriage as parvenus. Professor Catherine Nicault of the University of Reims Champagne-Ardenne has argued that this exemplified the way in which the French aristocracy was hostile toward Jews.

== Criticism by Traditional Upper Classes ==
Parvenus were often criticized for their taste and lack of cultural refinement, as they frequently retained tastes and aesthetic preferences associated with their humble social origins or sought to imitate the lifestyles and tastes of the upper bourgeoisie and aristocracy, often reproducing them in less refined and more vulgar forms.

Their tastes and manners, as well as their conspicuous displays of wealth, were sometimes met with disapproval, ridicule, or even revulsion among aristocrats, established members of the upper bourgeoisie, and families with longstanding intellectual traditions.

Such criticism often portrayed parvenus as rude, vulgar, and culturally unsophisticated, associating them with a narrow, self-interested, and predominantly profit-driven outlook.

They were criticized for valuing knowledge primarily for its practical and financial utility, while failing to appreciate the intrinsic value of intellectual cultivation, the humanities, and broader cultural education, particularly when these offered no immediate material benefit.

This utilitarian outlook was seen as reflecting a narrow intellectual horizon in which material gain and social advancement took precedence over aesthetic refinement, cultural literacy, and the pursuit of knowledge for its own sake.

Such judgments, however, could also reflect social prejudice, as the established elite often associated refined taste and cultural sophistication with ancestry and family tradition.

== Classic Literature ==
In nineteenth-century French and German literature the parvenu became a recurring figure of social exclusion, often portrayed with ambivalence about social mobility.

In literature, the parvenu has often been a target of biting satire and ridicule, mocked for his affected manners and his anxious, relentless striving to be accepted in his new milieu. In addition to their eccentric behaviour and compulsive desire for social acceptance, parvenus were often ridiculed by the traditional upper classes for the tastes and cultural preferences they had brought with them from their original social milieu.

- Jean-Baptiste Poquelin (Molière): Le Bourgeois gentilhomme (1670). Monsieur Jourdain, the son of a cloth merchant, aspires to pass as a nobleman, hiring dancing, fencing and philosophy tutors in the process. The play ridicules both his social pretensions and the snobbery of the aristocracy.
- Marie-Henri Beyle (Stendhal): The Red and the Black (1830). Julien Sorel, from a humble background, seeks advancement through education and ecclesiastical service. After establishing himself in the service of the Marquis de la Mole, he considers himself a parvenu. The novel also satirises Restoration-era society.
- Honoré de Balzac: Père Goriot (1835). Eugène de Rastignac, arriving in Paris from the provinces, learns to navigate the conventions and power structures of high society.
- William Makepeace Thackeray: Vanity Fair (1847–48), featuring Becky Sharp, an archetypal social climber who advances through opportunism and personal ambition; The Book of Snobs (1848), a satire of Victorian snobbery and social climbing; and The Luck of Barry Lyndon (1844), whose protagonist seeks advancement through deception and opportunism.
- Jane Austen: Pride and Prejudice (1813), featuring Mrs Bennet and the Bingleys, whose social standing and aspirations illuminate the distinctions between wealth, birth and social acceptance; and Emma (1815), featuring Philip Elton.
- Anne Brontë: The Tenant of Wildfell Hall (1848), featuring Jane Wilson.
- Charles Dickens: Great Expectations (1860–61). Pip is raised to become a gentleman, distancing himself from his original surroundings while struggling to feel at home in higher social circles.
- Alexandre Dumas: The Count of Monte Cristo (1844–46). Edmond Dantès, who assumes the identity and title of the Count of Monte Cristo, illustrates the relationship between acquired wealth, social identity and aristocratic status.
- Geoffrey Chaucer: The Miller's Tale and The Franklin's Tale, whose characters reflect medieval concerns about social standing and aspiration.
- Edgar Allan Poe: William Wilson, a story concerned with identity and the divided self.
- Guy de Maupassant: The Necklace (1884). Mathilde Loisel, dissatisfied with her modest circumstances, longs for the luxuries and prestige of high society.
- Anton Chekhov: The Cherry Orchard (1904). Lopakhin, the descendant of serfs who becomes a wealthy merchant, is regarded by the aristocratic Gayev and others as a social upstart.
- William Dean Howells: The Rise of Silas Lapham (1885). A newly wealthy manufacturer attempts to gain acceptance among Boston's social elite.
- Edith Wharton: The House of Mirth (1905), featuring Simon Rosedale, and The Custom of the Country (1913), which follows Undine Spragg's ruthless pursuit of social advancement.
- Theodore Dreiser: Sister Carrie (1900). Carrie Meeber's rise through the social hierarchy explores ambition, material success and social mobility.
- Samuel Langhorne Clemens (Mark Twain) and Charles Dudley Warner: The Gilded Age: A Tale of To-Day (1873), which satirises American speculation, nouveau-riche aspirations and the pursuit of wealth.
- Sinclair Lewis: Babbitt (1922), a satire of the social aspirations and conformity of the prosperous American middle class.
- Theodor Fontane: Frau Jenny Treibel (1892), which exposes the hypocrisy and social ambitions of a wealthy bourgeois woman.
- Thomas Mann: Buddenbrooks (1901), which examines the decline of an established merchant family and contrasts it with the rise of other bourgeois families; and Confessions of Felix Krull (1954), the story of a confidence man who insinuates himself into high society.
- Heinrich Mann: Der Untertan (1918), depicting Diederich Heßling's servile careerism and opportunism in Wilhelmine Germany.
- Carl Sternheim: Bürger Schippel (1913), a play about a man of humble origins who enters the circles of the established bourgeoisie.
- Joseph Roth: Radetzky March (1932), which follows successive generations of a family raised to hereditary nobility as they struggle to maintain their social position.
- George Călinescu: Enigma Otiliei (1938). Stănică Rațiu represents the newly rich, acquiring wealth through theft and marriage into an affluent social circle.

== See also ==
- Covetousness
- Hypergamy
- New Russian
- Nouveau riche
- Novus homo
- Snobbery
- Social mobility
- Yuppie
