= The Adventures of Philip =

1861–1862 novel by William Makepeace Thackeray

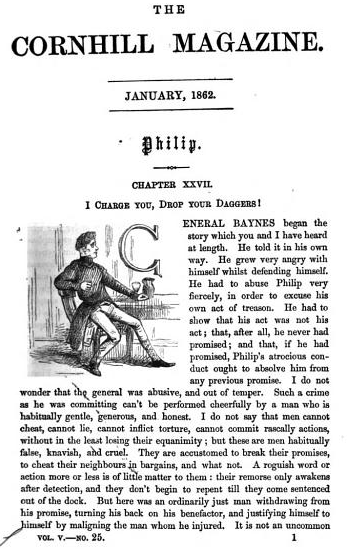
- Author: William Makepeace Thackeray
- Language: English
- Genre: Novel
- Publisher: Cornhill Magazine
- Publication date: 1861-62
- Publication place: United Kingdom
- Media type: Print (Magazine serial)
- Preceded by: A Shabby Genteel Story

The Adventures of Philip on his Way Through the World: Shewing Who Robbed Him, Who Helped Him, and Who Passed Him By is the final novel by the English author William Makepeace Thackeray, originally published in 1861–1862. It was the last novel Thackeray completed, and harks back to several of his previous ones, involving as it does characters from A Shabby Genteel Story and being, like The Newcomes, narrated by the title character of his Pendennis. In recent years it has not found as much favour from either readers or critics as Thackeray's early novels.

== Synopsis ==
Philip Firmin, son of Dr. Brand Firmin and of Lord Ringwood's wealthy niece, has been left a fortune at the death of his mother. He discovers that his father is being blackmailed by Tufton Hunt, a clergyman who once performed a sham marriage ceremony between Brandon and Caroline Gann (as related in A Shabby Genteel Story). Hunt now claims that the marriage was in fact valid, and urges Caroline to assert her rights and disinherit Philip by proving him illegitimate. Caroline, who is now working as a nurse and in this capacity has brought Philip through a serious illness, refuses to do this. Dr Firmin loses Philip's money and his own through unwise speculation and flees to America, and Philip's fiancée Agnes Twysden renounces him in favour of a wealthier rival. Philip now meets General Baynes, one of the trustees of his lost fortune, and falls in love with the General's daughter Charlotte. He marries her, in the teeth of her mother's opposition, and struggles to support her by becoming a journalist. His troubles are ended when the lost will of his great-uncle, Lord Ringwood, is discovered, and he is found to be the heir to the old man's riches.

== Publishing history and reception ==
The Adventures of Philip was first published as a serial in the Cornhill Magazine (of which Thackeray was the editor) between January 1861 and August 1862, with illustrations by the author and Frederick Walker. It then appeared in book form published by Smith, Elder & Co. in three volumes in 1862, dedicated 'in grateful remembrance of old friendship and kindness' to Thackeray's friend Matthew James Higgins. The Leipzig firm of Bernhard Tauchnitz issued it the same year in two volumes.

Critical reception of the book was on the whole not good, many reviewers suggesting that the author had written himself out. The anonymous notice in the Saturday Review, for example, claimed that Thackeray's readers "ask him for something from his pen; what it is they do not care; and as he really has no other method of easily satisfying them, he gives them reminiscences of his old novels in profusion." Walter Bagehot, in The Spectator, said, "As far as 'plot' is concerned, Philip is a failure. No one of all its most numerous readers has probably read it with eager interest as a story."

Nevertheless, Thackeray's fans must have found something to enjoy, since the book was reprinted frequently up the First World War. It fell into general neglect thereafter, very few reprints having been called for during the past 100 years, but in 2008 The Adventures of Philip was issued by Cambridge Scholars Publishing as volumes 12 and 13 of their edition of Thackeray's Complete Works, and a critical edition with commentary by Judith Law Fisher was published by the University of Michigan Press in 2010.
