= Henry Esmond =

Henry Esmond may refer to:

- The History of Henry Esmond, an 1852 historical novel by William Makepeace Thackeray
- Henry Esmond, Esq. the putative author (and protagonist) of The History of Henry Esmond, or William Makepeace Thackeray
- Henry V. Esmond (1869–1922), British actor and playwright
