= Catherine Hayes =

Catherine Hayes may refer to:

- Catherine Hayes (murderer) (1690-1726), English murderer
- Catherine Hayes (soprano) (1818-1861), Irish opera singer
- Catherine Hayes, main character of Thackeray's Catherine, based on the murderer
- Kathryn Hays, actress

== See also ==
- Kathryn Hay, politician
- Hayes (surname)
