= The Newcomes =

1854–1855 novel by William Makepeace Thackeray

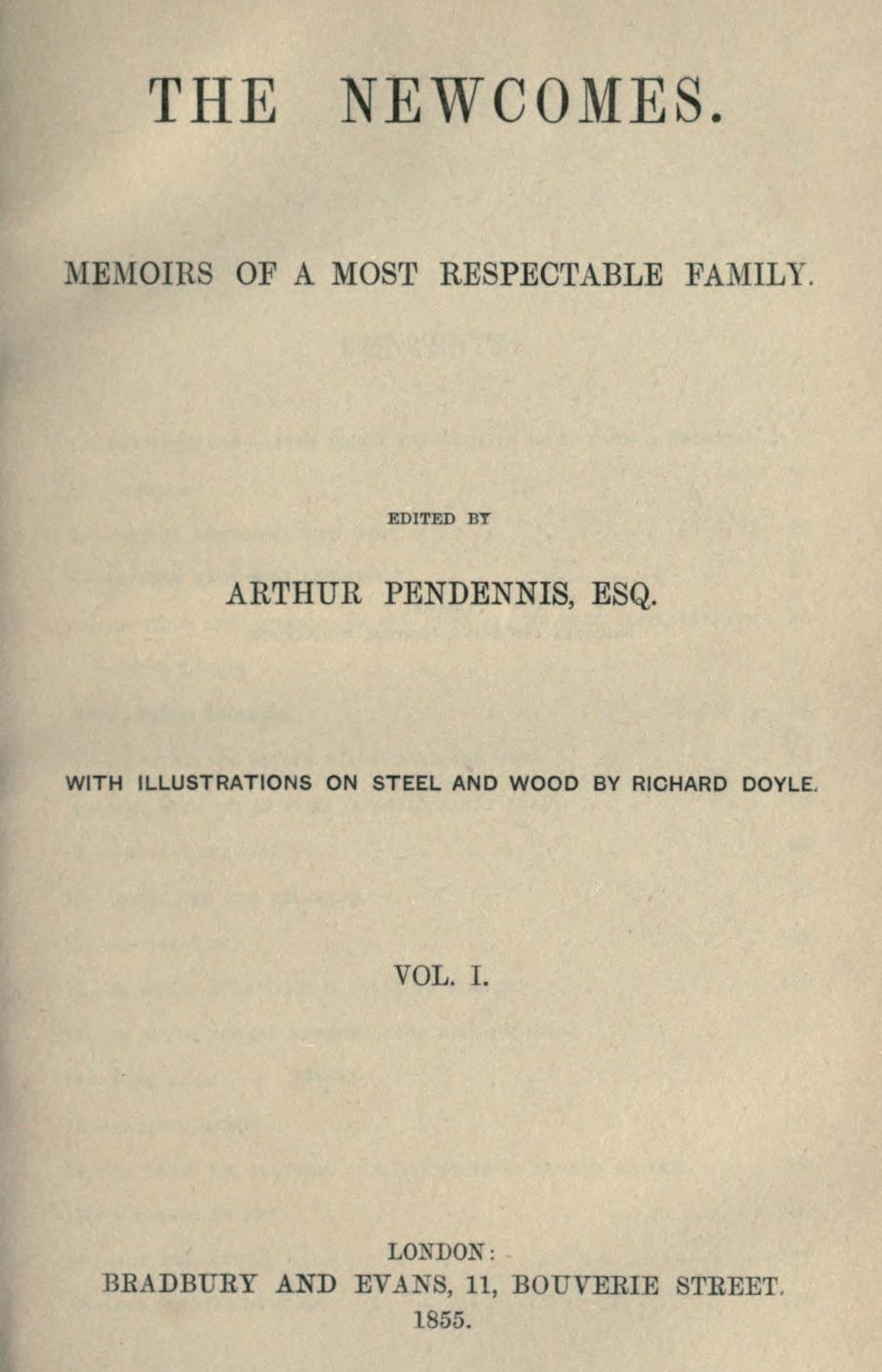
- First edition title page
- Author: William Makepeace Thackeray
- Illustrator: Richard Doyle
- Language: English
- Genre: Fiction
- Publisher: Bradbury and Evans
- Publication date: 1854–1855
- Publication place: England
- Preceded by: Pendennis
- Followed by: A Shabby Genteel Story

The Newcomes: Memoirs of a Most Respectable Family is a novel by William Makepeace Thackeray, first published in 1854 and 1855.

== Publication ==
The Newcomes was published serially over about two years, as Thackeray himself says in one of the novel's final chapters. The novel shows its serial origin: it is very long (published in 24 monthly parts between October 1853 and August 1855), and its events occur over many years and in several countries before the reader reaches the predictable conclusion. The main part of The Newcomes is set a decade or two after the action of Vanity Fair, and some of the characters in Vanity Fair are mentioned peripherally in The Newcomes. The narrator is Arthur Pendennis, the protagonist of Pendennis. It was illustrated by Richard Doyle, both in literal renderings of the scenes and in symbolic and fanciful depictions of events and characters.

== Plot ==
The novel tells the story of Colonel Thomas Newcome, a virtuous and upstanding character. It is equally the story of Colonel Newcome's son Clive, who studies and travels for the purpose of becoming a painter, although the profession is frowned on by some of his relatives and acquaintances—notably Clive's snobbish, backstabbing cousin Barnes Newcome.

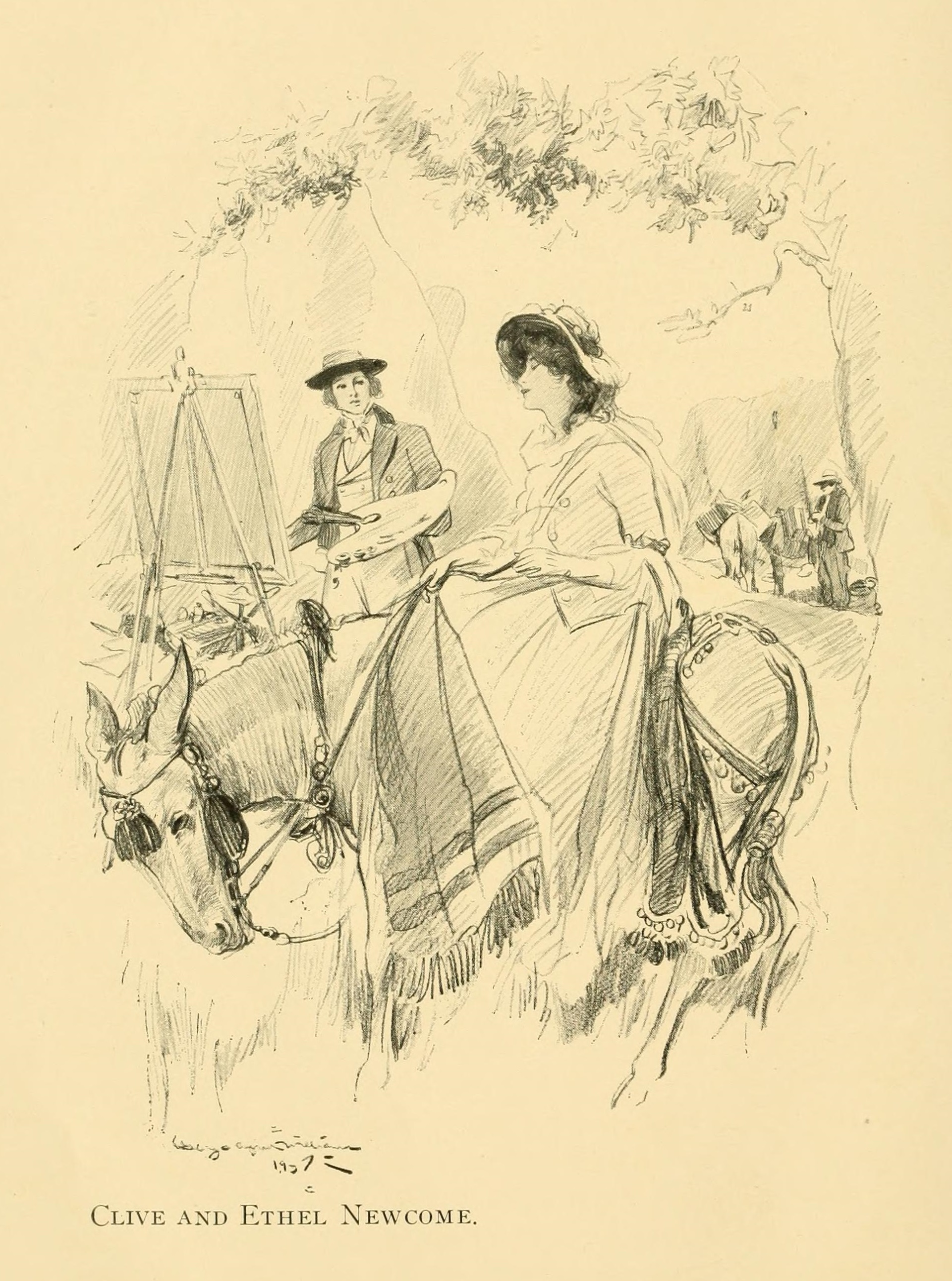
Clive and Ethel Newcome illustrated by George Alfred Williams

Colonel Newcome goes out to India for decades, then returns to England where Clive meets his cousin Ethel. After years in England, the colonel returns to India for another several years, and while he is there, Clive travels through Europe and his love for Ethel waxes and wanes. Dozens of background characters appear, fade, and reappear.

The colonel and Clive are only the central figures in The Newcomes, the action of which begins before the colonel's birth. Over several generations the Newcome family rises into wealth and respectability as bankers and starts to marry into the minor aristocracy. A theme that runs throughout the novel is the practice of marrying for money; found herein is the fist use of the coined word "capitalism", in reference to an economic system. Religion, particularly Methodism, is another theme.

== In popular culture ==
... Truth is never sacrificed to piquancy. The characters in the 'Newcomes' are not more witty, wise, or farcical than their prototypes; the dull, the insipid, and the foolish, speak according to their own fashion and not with the tongue of the author; the events which befall them are nowhere made exciting at the expense of probability. Just as the stream of life runs on through these volumes, so may it be seen to flow in the world itself by whoever takes up the same position on the bank.

The novel contains hundreds of references to the popular and educated culture of the time, giving readers a better idea of what it was like to live in Victorian England than most other books from the time period do. Thackeray mentions poets, painters, novelists (some of the characters are reading Oliver Twist), politics, and other people, events and things both familiar and obscure to the 21st-century reader. There are also Latin, French, Italian and ancient Greek phrases throughout the book, all untranslated.

Colonel Newcome came to be an emblem of virtue for a period, often referred to at the turn of the 20th century. In his autobiography, Theodore Roosevelt described his uncle, James Dunwoody Bulloch, as "a veritable Colonel Newcome".

Ethel Barrymore was named after the character in the novel.

== See also ==
- 1854 in literature
- 1855 in literature
