= The Virginians =

1857–1859 novel by William Makepeace Thackeray

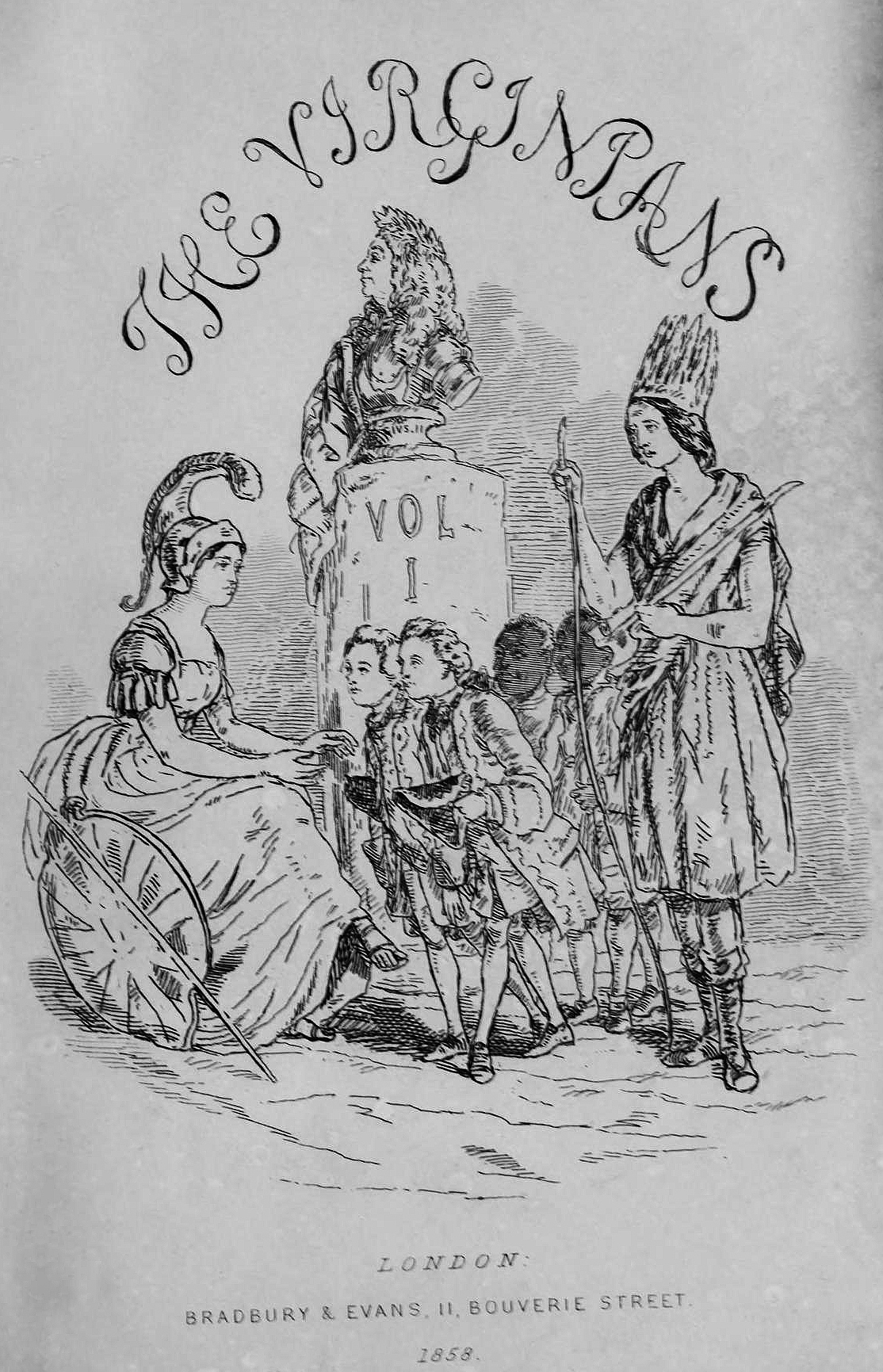
- First edition title page
- Author: William Makepeace Thackeray
- Illustrator: William Makepeace Thackeray
- Language: English
- Genre: Historical novel
- Publisher: Bradbury and Evans
- Publication date: 1857–59
- Publication place: United Kingdom
- Media type: Print (Unbound)
- Pages: 758 pp
- Preceded by: The History of Henry Esmond
- Followed by: Pendennis

The Virginians: A Tale of the Last Century (1857–59) is a historical novel by William Makepeace Thackeray which forms a sequel to his Henry Esmond and is also loosely linked to Pendennis.

== Plot summary ==
The novel tells the story of Henry Esmond's twin grandsons, Virginia-born George and Henry Warrington. At the beginning of the novel, the older twin, George, was missing in action and presumed dead, having participated in General Edward Braddock's disastrous expedition against Fort Duquesne (now Pittsburgh, Pennsylvania) as part of the Seven Years' War. Thus, Henry traveled to visit his English relatives as his widowed mother's sole heir. He was presumed rich and thus a desirable target for marriageable women and gamblers. As such, he became entangled in an engagement to his older cousin and in debt to gamblers.

The timely arrival of his brother George, who had managed to escape death and imprisonment, saved him. Since he was no longer heir to a rich estate, his fiancée dumped him. George paid Henry's gambling debts. As a second son with no money or prospects, he volunteered in the British army, eventually fighting under the command of General Wolfe at the 1759 capture of Quebec. After this, George and his widowed mother decided to help Henry purchase an estate in Virginia. George then married for love—his wife had no dowry. Thus, with his immediate cash depleted by helping his brother and his mother still in possession of the family estate, he needed to earn a living (including as a tutor). After his father's older brother died, George inherited both his baronetcy and a substantial estate, which enabled him to quit the tutoring position.

On the outbreak of the American War of Independence, Henry took the revolutionary side, while George sided with the king, although the brothers remained on good personal terms. Indeed, George decided to deed the Virginia plantation to his brother after their mother died.

== Critical reception ==
Critical reception of the book was on the whole favourable, and the novel has continued to be considered one of the standard works of 19th century fiction, though many critics have held that the novel's plotting was not of the tightest. Anthony Trollope's opinion was typical:

There is not a page of it vacant or dull. But he who takes it up to read as a whole, will find that it is the work of a desultory writer, to whom it is not infrequently difficult to remember the incidents of his own narrative.

Later critics have been less kind. An apocryphal story claims that Thackeray once confessed to Douglas William Jerrold that The Virginians was "the worst novel he ever wrote," while Jerrold replied, "No. It's the worst novel anyone ever wrote." In fact, Jerrold died before the first volume of The Virginians was published. J. A. Sutherland agreed to a degree, calling it Thackeray's worst major novel. John Halperin called it "the worst book ever produced by a great novelist." Jack P. Rawlins wrote that "The Virginians is a bad book — dissatisfying in the reading, acknowledged as dull and dried-up by Thackeray."

== Publication history ==
The Virginians was issued by Thackeray's publishers, Bradbury and Evans, in 24 monthly parts, the first one appearing on November 1, 1857. It was illustrated by the author himself. The print-run of 20,000 for the first number proved to be too optimistic and was progressively reduced to 13,000 for the last seven. Thackeray was originally to have been paid £300 per number, but the disappointing sales resulted in this being reduced to £250.

The Virginians was first published in book form in 1858-59 by Bradbury and Evans in two volumes, and almost simultaneously by the Leipzig firm of Bernhard Tauchnitz in four. Notable later reprints include its appearance as volume 15 of The Oxford Thackeray in 1908 with an introduction by George Saintsbury, and the 1911 Everyman's Library edition in two volumes.
