= Men's Wives =

1852 novel by William Makepeace Thackeray

It contains three satirical stories which portray unhappy marriages and exploitation of one partner by the other. Men's Wives (1852) is a novel by William Makepeace Thackeray.
