= Mrs. Perkins's Ball =

1846 novel by William Makepeace Thackeray

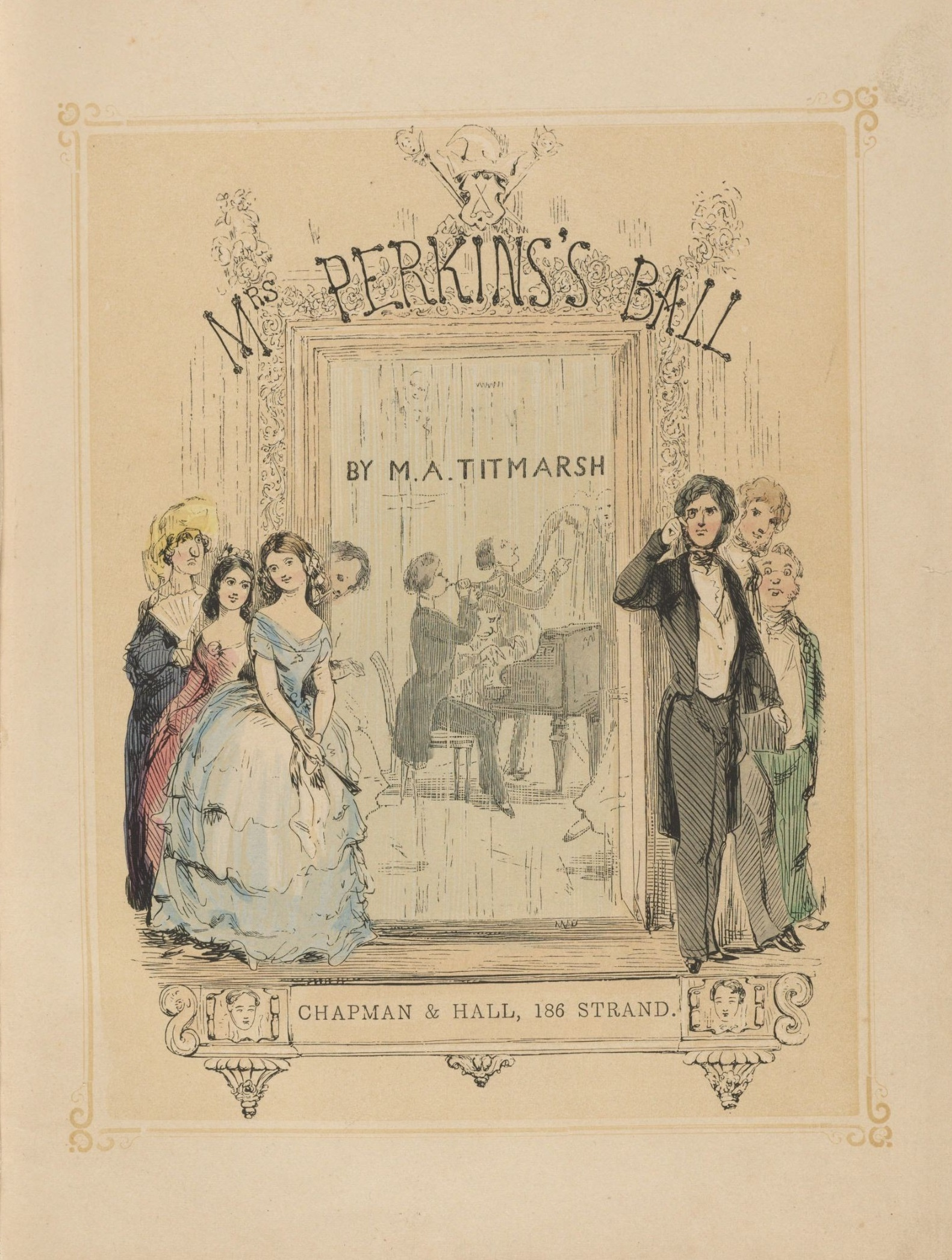
Title page of Mrs. Perkins's Ball

Mrs. Perkins's Ball is a novel by William Makepeace Thackeray, published under the pseudonym "M. A. Titmarsh" in 1846.

== Publication history ==
Mrs. Perkins's Ball was published as one of many Christmas novels; it was Thackeray's first attempt in the genre and its initial print run sold only 1,500 copies. In one review (written by Thackeray himself), he notes there were some 25 or 30 Christmas books published that season, including several illustrated by the "fast working" Isaac Robert Cruikshank. He then begins caustically reviewing Mrs. Perkins's Ball until, halfway through, he realizes in mock horror that he himself authored it and demands to "Kick old Father Christmas out of doors, the abominable old imposter! Next year I'll go to the Turks, the Scotch, or other Heathens who don't keep Christmas." The book was, nevertheless, popular enough that American author Mark Twain may have used the title character as an inspiration for his first known pen name, W. Epaminondas Adrastus Perkins, affixed to an article of his in the Hannibal Journal for 9 September 1852.
