= Snob =

Person who treats others with disdain

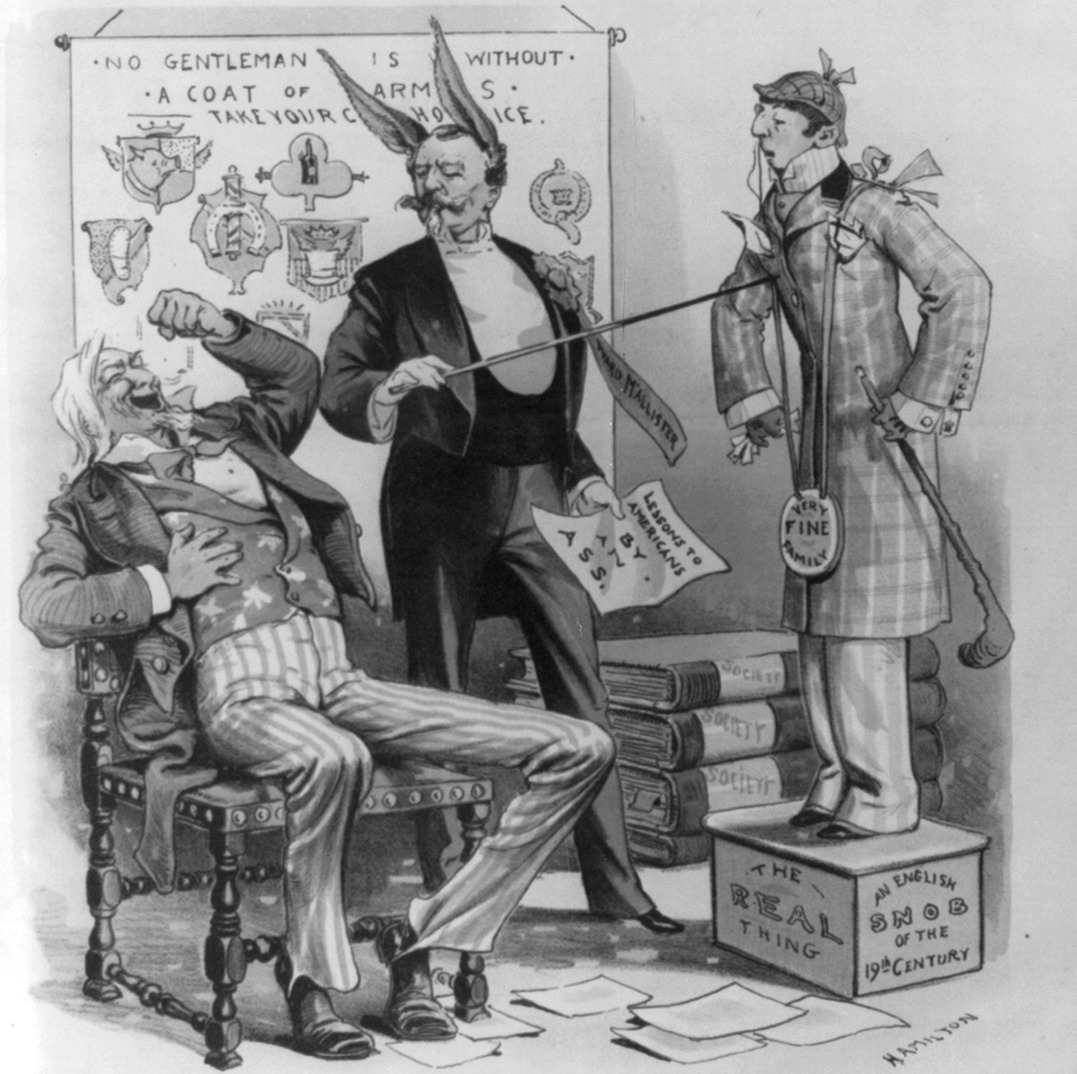
Caricature of American lawyer and socialite Ward McAllister (1855–1908) pointing Uncle Sam to "an English Snob of the 19th Century" and saying how he must imitate him or "you will nevah be a gentleman". Uncle Sam is shown laughing heartily.

Snob is a pejorative term for a person who feels superior due to their social class, education level, or social status in general; it is sometimes used especially when they pretend to belong to these classes. The word snobbery came into use for the first time in England during the 1820s.

== Examples ==
Criticisms of those who view themselves as superior (as a result of social class) have been found repeatedly throughout history, even before the concept was distilled into the word "snob". Critiques of the aloof and detached nature of the upper classes is noted in historical records of soldiers in ancient Sparta and Roman Bishops (especially during the Protestant Reformation).

Disdain for those viewed as lesser than is easier to actuate in locations where the clothing, manners, language, and tastes of every class were strictly codified by customs or law. An excellent example of this sentiment is described Geoffrey Chaucer, who noted the distaste amongst the Canterbury Pilgrims for the provincial French spoken by the Prioress:

And French she spoke full fair and fetisly
After the school of Stratford atte Bowe,
For French of Paris was to her unknowe.

William Rothwell notes "the simplistic contrast between the 'pure' French of Paris and her 'defective' French of Stratford atte Bowe that would invite disparagement".

This distinction is theorized to have become more prominent as the classes became less legally codified with the erosion of sumptry laws, providing the bourgeoisie the possibility to imitate aristocracy. Thus this phenomenon appears when elements of culture are perceived as belonging to an aristocracy or elite, and some people (the "snobs") feel that the mere adoption of the fashion and tastes of the elite or aristocracy is edifying, resulting in a feeling of superiority over those who do not emulate these tastes.

== Snob victim ==
The term "snob" is often misused when describing a "gold-tap owner", i.e. a person who insists on displaying (sometimes non-existent) wealth through conspicuous consumption of luxury goods such as clothes, jewelry, cars etc. Displaying awards or talents in a rude manner, boasting, is a form of snobbery. A popular example of a "snob victim" is the television character Hyacinth Bucket of the BBC comedy series Keeping Up Appearances.

== Analysis ==
William Hazlitt observed, in a culture where deference to class was accepted as a positive and unifying principle, "Fashion is gentility running away from vulgarity, and afraid of being overtaken by it," adding subversively, "It is a sign the two things are not very far apart." The English novelist Bulwer-Lytton remarked in passing, "Ideas travel upwards, manners downwards." It was not the deeply ingrained and fundamentally accepted idea of "one's betters" that has marked snobbery in traditional European and American culture, but "aping one's betters".

Snobbery is a defensive expression of social insecurity, flourishing most where an establishment has become less than secure in the exercise of its traditional prerogatives, and thus it was more an organizing principle for Thackeray's glimpses of British society in the threatening atmosphere of the 1840s than it was of Hazlitt, writing in the comparative social stability of the 1820s.

== See also ==
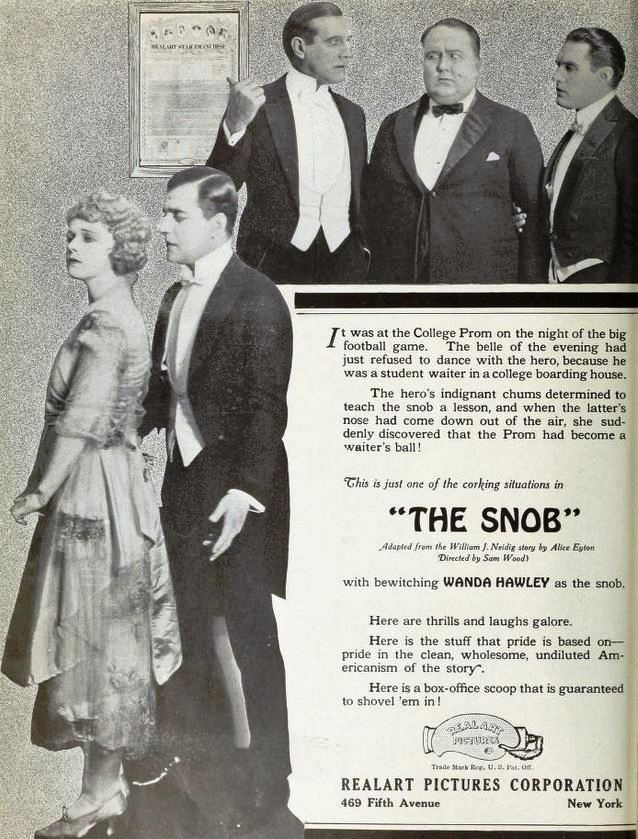
Ad for the American film The Snob, 1921 film with Wanda Hawley and Walter Hiers, on inside front cover of the January 30, 1921 Film Daily.

- Arrogance
- Assertiveness
- Boasting, something which is higher in a hierarchical structure of any kind
- Confidence
- Chronological snobbery
- Classism
- Contempt
- Discrimination
- Egotism
- Elitism
- Emotional insecurity
- Entitlement
- Envy
- Four Yorkshiremen sketch
- Greed
- Inferiority complex
- Jealousy
- Narcissism
- Prejudice
- Prestige
- Pride
- Privilege
- Prima donna
- Queen bee
- Respectability
- Social climber
- Superiority
- Superiority complex
- Supremacy
- The Book of Snobs
- The Snob (1924 film)
- Vanity
