= Catherine (Thackeray novel) =

1839–1840 novel by William Makepeace Thackeray

Catherine: A Story
- Author: William Makepeace Thackeray
- Language: English
- Genre: Picaresque novel
- Published: 1839–1840
- Publication place: United Kingdom
- Media type: Print

Catherine: A Story was the first novel by English author William Makepeace Thackeray. It first appeared in serialized instalments in Fraser's Magazine between May 1839 and February 1840, credited to "Ikey Solomons, Esq. Junior". Thackeray's original intention in writing it was to criticize the Newgate school of crime fiction, exemplified by Bulwer-Lytton and Harrison Ainsworth, whose works Thackeray felt glorified criminals. Thackeray even included Dickens in this criticism for his portrayal of the good-hearted streetwalker Nancy and the charming pickpocket, the Artful Dodger, in Oliver Twist.

Ainsworth's Jack Sheppard portrayed a real-life prison breaker and thief from the eighteenth century in flattering terms. In contrast, Thackeray sought out a real-life criminal whom he could portray in as unflattering terms as possible. He settled on Catherine Hayes, another eighteenth-century criminal, who was burned at the stake for murdering her husband in 1726. However, as he told his mother, Thackeray developed a "sneaking kindness" for his heroine, and the novel that was supposed to present criminals as totally vile, without any redeeming characteristics, instead made Catherine and her roguish companions seem rather appealing. Thackeray felt the result was a failure, and did not republish it in his lifetime.

== Literary significance and criticism ==
Thackeray himself, in the last instalment of the novel, has his narrator say that the newspapers, reporting on earlier instalments, had abused Catherine by calling it "one of the dullest, most vulgar and immoral works extant." In a private letter, Thackeray also said that the story was not well liked, though he also reported that Thomas Carlyle had said it was wonderful and that others had lauded it highly.

Later commentators sometimes were quite negative, as in the following comment from 1971: "This interminable tale is often cited as an early example of a takeoff on mystery fiction. If it parodies anything, it is the author's novelistic talent."

On the other hand, the noted critic George Saintsbury thought the novel had many good qualities, including its style and its rich texture of allusions. It has also been suggested that the heroine, though crudely drawn, looks forward to the much more famous Becky Sharp of Thackeray's Vanity Fair.
