= A Shabby Genteel Story =

1840 novel by William Makepeace Thackeray

A Shabby Genteel Story is an early and unfinished novel by William Makepeace Thackeray. It was first printed among other stories and sketches in his collection Miscellanies. A note in Miscellanies by Thackeray, dated 10 April 1857, describes it as "only the first part" of a longer story which was "interrupted at a sad period of the writer's own life" and never subsequently completed. He also describes it as being written "seventeen years ago", therefore c. 1840. This was the period when Thackeray's wife became mentally unstable, throwing his personal life into confusion. When he was preparing to publish the "Miscellanies" 17 years later, he thought for a moment of filling in what was missing, but even then he did not carry out his intention. "The memory of the past," he explained, "was awakened in him anew when he read the old papers again, and the sketch was best left in its original form." Perhaps it was to escape the sad impressions of his immediate environment that Thackeray went to Paris in December of the fateful year. His stay there was extended until the summer of the following year, and a series of new publications testified to the determination of the deeply shaken but strong, unbroken spirit to continue the work he had begun.

== Plot summary ==
After a brief preliminary chapter outlining the early life of certain characters the story begins in England in the winter of 1835. A well-born but impoverished gentleman calling himself "George Brandon" is hiding from his creditors in the out-of-season seaside town of Margate. He finds cheap lodgings with a family consisting of James Gann, a bankrupted small businessman; his termagant and socially pretentious wife, Juliana; her two elder daughters by her first husband, Rosalind and Isabella Wellesley Macarty; and her downtrodden youngest daughter, Caroline Gann.

Though he despises the entire family as ridiculously vulgar, Brandon plans to amuse himself by seducing one or other of the elder girls, who are local belles; but though at first they find him attractive they soon realise he is mocking them and their social milieu. Thereafter they treat him with scorn, and so Brandon irritably switches his attentions to the youngest, Caroline. She responds by conceiving a passionate first love for him, and he begins a covert flirtation with her – in part to irritate another lodger who adores her. This is the handsome, vain, deluded young artist Andrew 'Andrea' Fitch. From being at first an amusement to Brandon however Caroline eventually becomes an obsession, for although desperately in love she makes it clear she will not sleep with him unless he offers marriage: and this Brandon cannot do, as his financial future depends on his making a good match with a wealthy wife. As he grows increasingly frustrated with Caroline he becomes more and more furious with her admirer, Fitch, who suspects his designs on the girl and thwarts them where he can. Brandon finally insults Fitch, who then grandiosely challenges him to a duel. With the help of two of Brandon's friends visiting from university (a dissipated young nobleman called Viscount Cinqbars and his toady, Rev. Thomas Tufthunt) the 'duel' takes place, though the pistols in fact are not loaded.(Thackeray uses a similar plot device in The Luck of Barry Lyndon). The "duel" is interrupted anyway by the arrival of a wealthy lady previously besotted with Fitch, who impetuously carries him off with her. Brandon by this time is so intent on having Caroline that he allows the Rev. Tufthunt to marry them, and they run away together. There the story ends.

In his note to the earliest edition Thackeray hints at how the plot was to have developed: "Caroline was to have been disowned and deserted by her wicked husband: that abandoned man was to marry somebody else: hence, bitter trials and grief, patience and virtue, for poor little Caroline, and a melancholy ending – as how should it have been gay?"

== Characters ==
"George Brandon": the pseudonym used by a gentleman of twenty-seven who takes lodgings with the Ganns. He has graceful manners, and the pale skin and large dark eyes of a Romantic poet. In fact he is the son of a half-pay colonel who at some cost has put him through Eton and Oxford, with the result that Brandon has come to despise any way of life other than that of an aristocratic playboy. Unfortunately, he is not wealthy enough to support his tastes and is in Margate because he can hide from his creditors there: "He was free of his money; would spend his last guinea for a sensual gratification; would borrow from his neediest friend; had no kind of conscience or remorse left, but believed himself to be a good-natured, devil-may-care fellow; had a good deal of wit, and indisputably good manners, and pleasing, dashing frankness in conversation with men."

Caroline Gann: the fifteen-year-old daughter of the house where Brandon has lodgings. Pretty and shy, she is bullied by her mother and half-sisters. Caroline is addicted to romantic novels, and solemnly believes that one day her own life will develop along similar lines. Brandon strikes her as everything a heroic lover should be, and she trusts him almost absolutely; but not quite enough to allow herself either to be pressured or seduced into sleeping with him before being married.

Andrea Fitch: born Andrew Fitch, and a Cockney: but having become a painter and travelled to Italy, calls himself Andrea. Described as "... a fantastic youth, who lived but for his art; to whom the world was like the Coburg theatre, and he in a magnificent costume acting a principal part. His art, and his beard and whiskers, were the darlings of his heart. His long pale hair fell over a high polished brow, which looked wonderfully thoughtful; and yet no man was ever more guiltless of thinking." Like Brandon, Fitch is attracted to Caroline and believes himself in love; but in his case rather than seduce the girl he wishes to write her sonnets, worship her from afar, paint her portrait and gradually win her heart. The absurd but high-minded Fitch has already spurned the advances of a rich middle-aged widow who fell for him in Rome, a Mrs Carrickfergus. When Caroline runs away with Brandon however the heart-broken Andrea ends up marrying the impassioned widow.

The Ganns: Caroline Gann's father, James Gann, his wife Julianna, his step-daughters Isabella and Rosalinda Wellesley Macarty. They are the shabby genteel people of the title, having dubious backgrounds but a small private income (inherited from Juliana's mother, who kept an inn) which allows them to give themselves airs as gentlefolk.

Viscount Cinqbars: a young nobleman, still at university, whom Brandon had previously tutored on a continental tour. He admires Brandon as the sort of rakish seducer he fancies himself to be – though Cinqbars is both small and ugly and his only personal attraction is his money.

Reverend Thomas Tufthunt: a hanger-on of Cinqbars, a university man who has recently taken holy orders. He quietly detests Brandon, who is his rival for Cinqbars's patronage. He gleefully consents to perform the clandestine marriage ceremony, reasoning that it will ruin Brandon to marry a penniless girl.

Becky: the maid of all work in the Gann household and Caroline's only friend. From her under-privileged viewpoint she easily sees through the pretensions of most of the characters, but is so devoted to Caroline she suspends judgment on Brandon: "If he's really in love, miss, and I think he be, he'll marry you; if he won't marry you he's a rascal, and you're too good for him, and must have nothing to do with him."

== Themes ==
Self-delusion and snobbery are the major themes, along with society's underlying obsession with money: the threat to female innocence posed by unprincipled young men is also present. Though the planned plot development would have called for greater depth and seriousness, the tone set by the existing first part is exuberantly humorous, with Thackeray employing a mix of sententious satire, acid social commentary and his gift for outright farce. All the characters are presented as self-deceiving to some degree, even the virtuous heroine Caroline; though Andrea Fitch, constantly acting out his own idealised version of himself, is the most striking example: "He was always putting himself into attitudes; he never spoke the truth; and was so entirely affected and absurd, as to be quite honest at last: for it is my belief that the man did not know truth from falsehood any longer..."
