= The History of Henry Esmond =

1852 novel by William Makepeace Thackeray

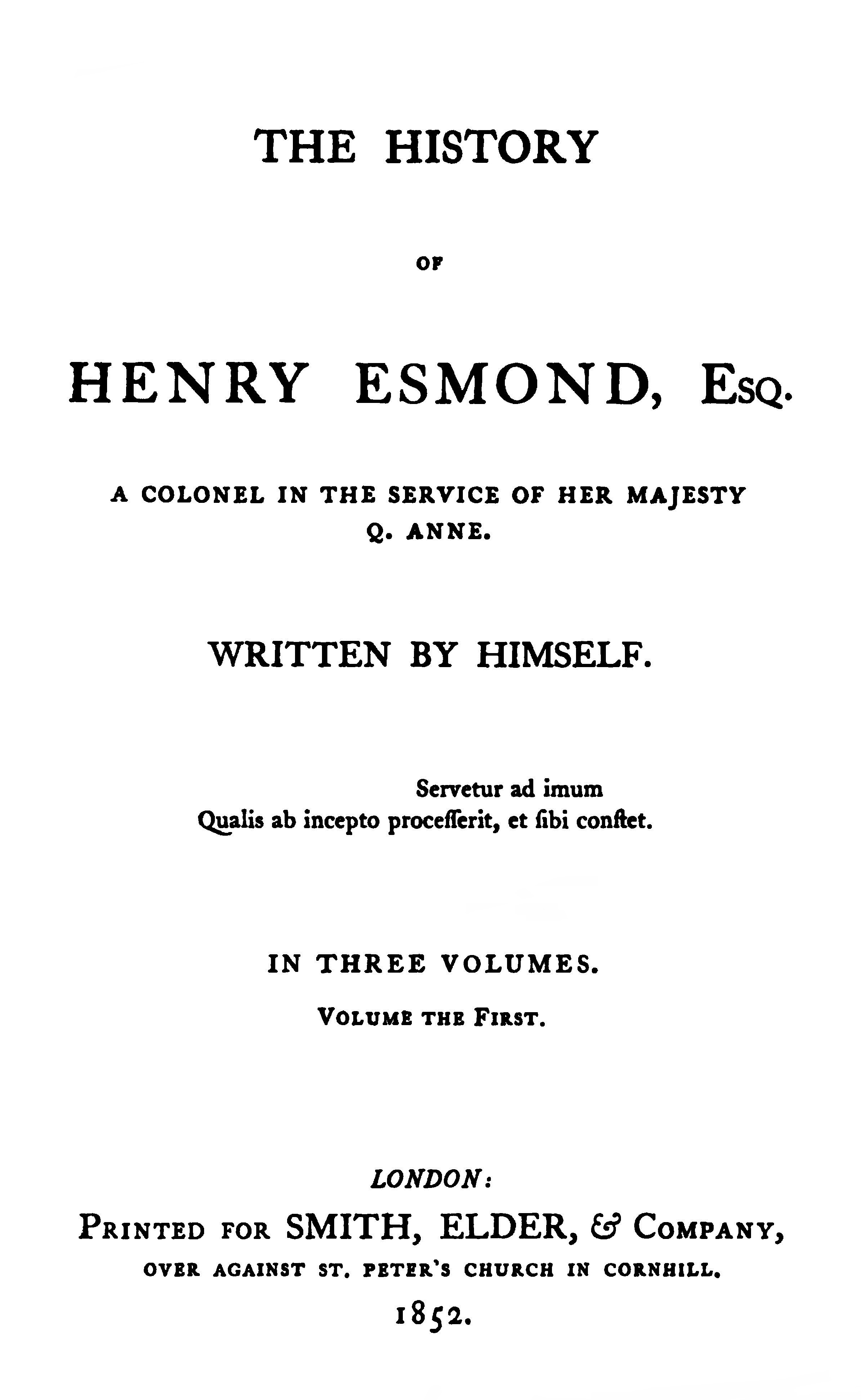
- First edition title page
- Author: William Makepeace Thackeray
- Original title: The History of Henry Esmond, Esq., A Colonel in the Service of Her Majesty Queen Anne
- Language: English
- Genre: Historical fiction
- Publisher: Smith, Elder & Co.
- Publication date: 1852
- Publication place: England
- Media type: Print
- Pages: 464
- Followed by: The Virginians

The History of Henry Esmond is a historical novel by William Makepeace Thackeray, originally published in 1852. The book tells the story of the early life of Henry Esmond, a colonel in the service of Queen Anne of England. A typical example of Victorian historical novels, Thackeray's work of historical fiction tells its tale against the backdrop of late 17th- and early 18th-century England, and utilises characters both real (but dramatised) and imagined. It weaves its central character into a number of events such as the Glorious Revolution, the War of the Spanish Succession, the Hamilton–Mohun duel and the Hanoverian Succession.

== Plot summary ==
Henry Esmond relates his own history in memoir fashion, mainly in the third person but occasionally dropping into the first person. Henry, born about 1678, is an orphan and lives near London in the care of French Huguenot refugees. When Henry is about ten years old, Thomas Esmond, third Viscount Castlewood, removes him from his caretakers and takes him to Castlewood.

Henry lives at Castlewood as a servant, and it is generally assumed that he is the viscount's illegitimate son. The Catholic viscount opposes the legitimacy of King William III and is killed fighting for James II at the Battle of the Boyne (1690). Castlewood is temporarily occupied by the army and Henry is befriended by a trooper, the writer Richard Steele. The estate passes to Thomas's Protestant cousin Francis Esmond, who becomes the fourth viscount.

The new viscount and his wife foster the young Henry; he eats at the table as a member of the family. Henry is attached to his foster family. Lady Castlewood serves as a mother figure to him. Her husband treats Esmond well, but he drinks heavily and has limited intellect and crude manners, which causes his wife embarrassment.

Henry remains at Castlewood until his foster-parents send him to Cambridge University, where they intend him to become a clergyman. However, in Henry's last year at the university, the fourth viscount is killed in a duel. On his deathbed he tells Henry that Thomas Esmond, the third viscount, was in fact his father, and that Henry is not illegitimate at all but the legal heir to the title and estate of Castlewood. Henry, thinking of the pain and disgrace this would cause his foster-mother and cousins, burns the confession and tells no one.

Lady Castlewood blames Henry for the viscount's death and forbids him to see any of the family again. After spending a year in prison for his part in the duel, Henry joins the army and fights in the War of the Spanish Succession. Returning to England, now twenty-three, he becomes reconciled with his foster mother and visits his cousins: Frank (now the fifth viscount), an unintelligent but good-natured boy of seventeen, and Beatrix, not yet sixteen but already tall and beautiful. Frank is determined to join the army as soon as he can; Beatrix is already flirting with several wealthy men, and Lady Castlewood tells Henry that Beatrix is vain and heartless and no man who marries her will be happy. Henry, smitten with Beatrix's looks himself, returns to his regiment and fights in the Netherlands and Spain until the end of the first phase of the war in 1708.

Leaving the army, Henry settles in London to make his fortune as a writer. He meets many of the celebrated English writers of the day, and renews his friendship with Richard Steele, who introduces him to Joseph Addison. Esmond's play is a flop and he turns to writing political pamphlets and letters supporting his Tory friends and abusing the Duke of Marlborough, against whom he bears a grudge, while favoring John Richmond Webb (who was Thackeray's great-great-great-uncle.) Esmond represents Addison and Steele as cheerful, civil gentlemen who remain his friends even though they are on opposite sides politically. On the other hand, he draws Jonathan Swift, who was on his own side, as a hateful misanthrope and bully.

Henry and his cousin Frank later join an unsuccessful (and unhistorical) attempt to restore James Francis Edward Stuart to the British throne. After much intrigue, Henry grows disillusioned with Jacobitism and comes to accept the Whig future of Great Britain. Failing to marry his cousin Beatrix, he instead marries his foster-mother Lady Castlewood. The novel closes on the couple's emigration to Virginia in 1718.

== Reception ==
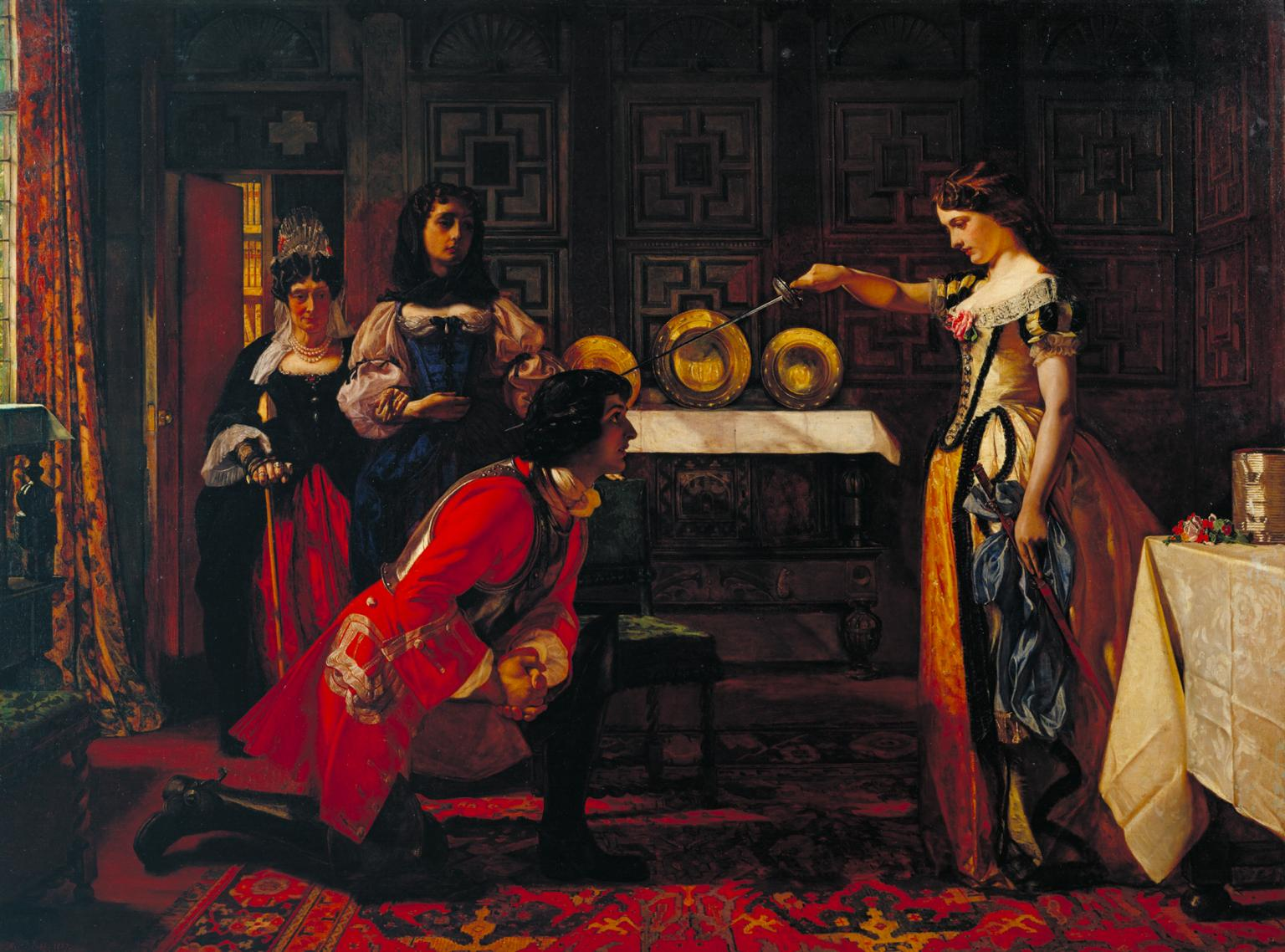
Beatrix Knighting Esmond by Augustus Leopold Egg (1857, Tate)

In a private critique of the work, written in a letter to a friend, novelist George Eliot labelled it "the most uncomfortable book you can imagine ... the hero is in love with the daughter all through the book, and marries the mother at the end." However, American publisher and writer James T. Fields, in his autobiographical Yesterdays with Authors, said of the book, and of his friend Thackeray:

To my thinking, it is a marvel in literature, and I have read it oftener than any of the other works. Perhaps the reason of my partiality lies somewhat in this little incident. One day, in the snowy winter of 1852, I met Thackeray sturdily ploughing his way down Beacon Street with a copy of Henry Esmond (the English edition, then just issued) under his arm. Seeing me some way off, he held aloft the volumes and began to shout in great glee. When I came up to him he cried out, "Here is the very best I can do, and I am carrying it to Prescott as a reward of merit for having given me my first dinner in America. I stand by this book, and am willing to leave it, when I go, as my card."

Anthony Trollope thought Thackeray the greatest novelist of his time and Esmond his masterpiece.

Ippolito Nievo's novel Confessions of an Italian shows similarities with The History of Henry Esmond, in the fundamental structure of the plot, in the psychological outlines of the main characters, in frequent episodes, and in the use of metaphors.

Louis Auchincloss mentions Henry Esmond with reference to the protagonist of The Rector of Justin.

== Sequel ==
The sequel to this novel was The Virginians, written in 1857–59. It takes place in both England and America, and details the lives of Esmond's grandsons, brothers George and Henry Warrington.

== "Queen Anne style" ==
Although popularised by British architects George Devey and Richard Norman Shaw, the anachronistic "Queen Anne" design style created in the latter part of the 19th century, for both buildings and furniture, won its Victorian nomenclature via readers' enthusiasm for Thackeray's detailed descriptions of that period in Henry Esmond.

Thackeray visited Clevedon Court in Clevedon, Somerset, in 1848 and the house was the inspiration for the setting of Castlewood. His printers added to the period atmosphere of the novel by printing it entirely in Caslon types from the 1730s, using the long s.
