= William Makepeace Thackeray =

English novelist and illustrator (1811–1863)

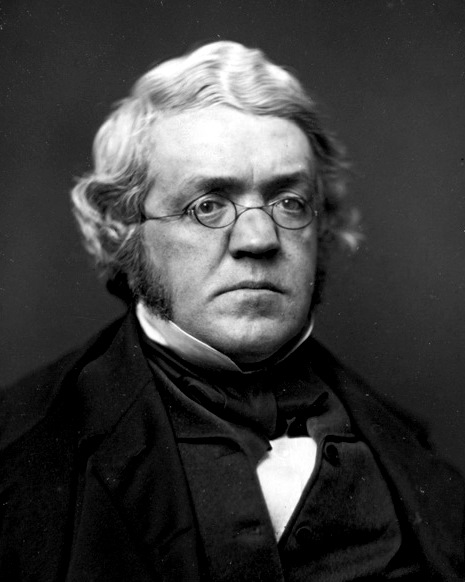
- 1855 daguerreotype of William Makepeace Thackeray by Jesse Harrison Whitehurst
- Born: 18 July 1811; Calcutta, Bengal Presidency, India
- Died: 24 December 1863 (aged 52); London, England
- Education: Charterhouse School; Trinity College, Cambridge
- Occupations: Novelist; poet
- Spouse: Isabella Gethin Shawe
- Children: 3; including Anne and Harriet
- Writing career
- Period: 1829–1863
- Genre: Historical fiction
- Notable works: Vanity Fair, The Luck of Barry Lyndon

Signature
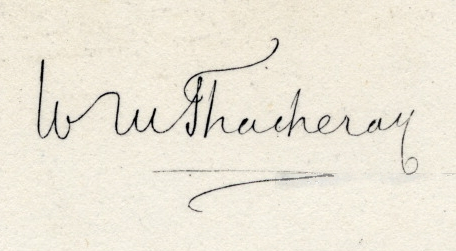

William Makepeace Thackeray (/ˈθækəri/ THAK-ər-ee; 18 July 1811 – 24 December 1863) was an English novelist and illustrator. He is known for his satirical works, particularly his 1847–1848 novel Vanity Fair, a panoramic portrait of British society, and the 1844 novel The Luck of Barry Lyndon, which was adapted for a 1975 film by Stanley Kubrick.

Thackeray was born in Calcutta, British India, and was sent to England after his father's death in 1815. He studied at various schools and briefly attended Trinity College, Cambridge, before leaving to travel Europe. Thackeray squandered much of his inheritance on gambling and unsuccessful newspapers. He turned to journalism to support his family, primarily working for Fraser's Magazine, The Times, and Punch. His wife Isabella suffered from mental illness. Thackeray gained fame with his novel Vanity Fair and produced several other notable works. He unsuccessfully ran for Parliament in 1857 and edited the Cornhill Magazine in 1860. Thackeray's health declined from excessive eating, drinking, and lack of exercise. He died from a stroke at the age of fifty-two.

Thackeray began as a satirist and parodist, gaining popularity through works that showcased his fondness for roguish characters. Thackeray's early works were marked by savage attacks on high society, military prowess, marriage, and hypocrisy, often written under various pseudonyms. His writing career began with satirical sketches like The Yellowplush Papers. Thackeray's later novels, such as Pendennis and The Newcomes, reflected a mellowing in his tone, focusing on the coming of age of characters and critical portrayals of society. During the Victorian era, Thackeray was ranked second to Charles Dickens, but he is now primarily known for Vanity Fair.

== Biography ==
=== Early life ===
Thackeray, an only child, was born in Calcutta, (Note: Calcutta was the capital of the British Empire in India at the time. Thackeray was born on the grounds of what is now the Armenian College & Philanthropic Academy, on the old Freeschool Street, now called Mirza Ghalib Street.) British India, where his father, Richmond Thackeray (1 September 1781 – 13 September 1815), was secretary to the Board of Revenue in the East India Company. His mother, Anne Becher (1792–1864), was the second daughter of Harriet Becher and John Harman Becher, who was also a secretary (writer) for the East India Company. His father was a grandson of Thomas Thackeray (1693–1760), headmaster of Harrow School.

Richmond died in 1815, which caused Anne to send her son to England that same year, while she remained in India. The ship on which he travelled made a short stopover at Saint Helena, where the imprisoned Napoleon was pointed out to him. Once in England, he was educated at schools in Southampton and Chiswick, and then at Charterhouse School, where he overlapped with John Leech. Thackeray disliked Charterhouse, and parodied it in his fiction as "Slaughterhouse". Nevertheless, Thackeray was honoured in the Charterhouse Chapel with a monument after his death.

=== College education ===
Illness in his last year at Charterhouse, during which he reportedly grew to his full height of 6 ft 3 in (1.91 m), postponed his matriculation at Trinity College, Cambridge, until February 1829.

Never very keen on academic studies, Thackeray left Cambridge in 1830, but some of his earliest published writing appeared in two university periodicals, The Snob and The Gownsman.

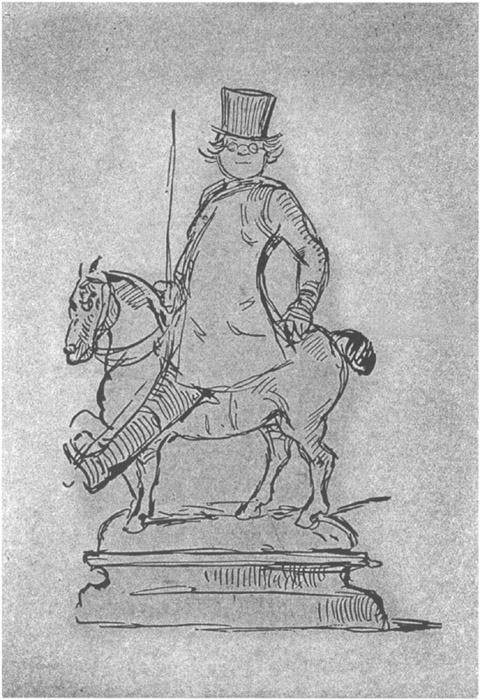
Self Caricature by Thackeray

Thackeray then travelled for some time on Continental Europe, visiting Paris and Weimar, where he met Johann Wolfgang von Goethe. He returned to England and began to study law at the Middle Temple, but soon gave that up. On reaching age 21, he came into his inheritance from his father, but he squandered much of it on gambling and on funding two unsuccessful newspapers, The National Standard and The Constitutional, for which he had hoped to write. He also lost a good part of his fortune in the collapse of two Indian banks. Forced to consider a profession to support himself, he turned first to art, which he studied in Paris, but did not pursue it, except in later years as the illustrator of some of his own novels and other writings.

=== Marriage and children ===
Thackeray's years of semi-idleness ended on 20 August 1836, when he married Isabella Gethin Shawe (1816–1894), second daughter of Isabella Creagh Shawe and Matthew Shawe, a colonel who had died after distinguished service, primarily in India. The Thackerays had three children, all daughters: Anne Isabella (1837–1919), Jane (who died at eight months old), and Harriet Marian (1840–1875), who married Sir Leslie Stephen, editor, biographer and philosopher.

=== Professional journalist ===
Thackeray now began "writing for his life", as he put it, turning to journalism in an effort to support his young family. He primarily worked for Fraser's Magazine, a sharp-witted and sharp-tongued conservative publication for which he produced art criticism, short fictional sketches, and two longer fictional works, Catherine and The Luck of Barry Lyndon. Between 1837 and 1840, he also reviewed books for The Times.

He was also a regular contributor to The Morning Chronicle and The Foreign Quarterly Review. Later, through his connection to the illustrator John Leech, he began writing for the newly created magazine Punch, in which he published The Snob Papers, later collected as The Book of Snobs. This work popularised the modern meaning of the word "snob".

Thackeray was a regular contributor to Punch between 1843 and 1854.

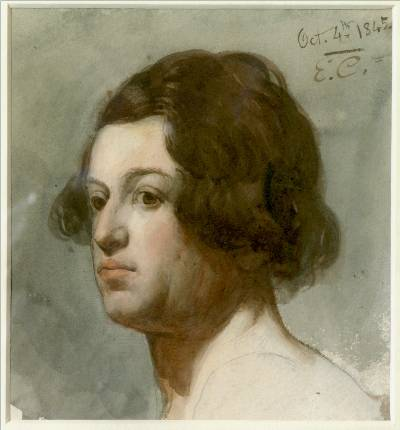
Thackeray portrayed by Eyre Crowe, 1845

=== Mental decline of his wife and romantic relationships ===
In Thackeray's personal life, his wife Isabella succumbed to depression after the birth of their third child in 1840. Finding that he could get no work done at home, he spent more and more time away, until September 1840, when he realised how grave his wife's condition was. Struck by guilt, he set out with his wife to Ireland. During the crossing, she threw herself from a water-closet into the sea, but she was pulled from the waters. They fled back home after a four-week battle with her mother. From November 1840 to February 1842, Isabella was in and out of professional care, as her condition waxed and waned.

She eventually deteriorated into a permanent state of detachment from reality. Thackeray desperately sought cures for her, but nothing worked, and she ended up in two different asylums in or near Paris until 1845, after which Thackeray took her back to England, where he installed her with a Mrs. Bakewell at Camberwell. Isabella outlived her husband by 30 years, in the end being cared for by a family named Thompson in Leigh-on-Sea at Southend, until her death in 1894. After his wife's illness, Thackeray never established another permanent relationship. He did pursue other women, however, in particular Mrs. Jane Brookfield and Sally Baxter. In 1851, Mr. Brookfield barred Thackeray from further visits or correspondence with Jane. Baxter, an American twenty years Thackeray's junior whom he met during a lecture tour in New York City in 1852, married another man in 1855.

=== Anti-Irish works for Punch ===
In the early 1840s, Thackeray had some success with two travel books, The Paris Sketch Book and The Irish Sketch Book, the latter marked by its hostility towards Irish Catholics. However, as the book appealed to anti-Irish sentiment in Britain at the time, Thackeray was given the job of being Punch's Irish expert, often under the pseudonym Hibernis Hibernior (Latin for 'more Irish than the Irish'). Thackeray became responsible for creating Punch's notoriously hostile and negative depictions of the Irish during the Great Famine of 1845 to 1851.

=== Status as a celebrity and lecture tours ===
Thackeray achieved more recognition with his Snob Papers (serialised 1846/7, published in book form in 1848), but the work that really established his fame was the novel Vanity Fair, which first appeared in serialised instalments beginning in January 1847. Even before Vanity Fair completed its serial run, Thackeray had become a celebrity, sought after by the very lords and ladies whom he satirised. They hailed him as the equal of Charles Dickens.

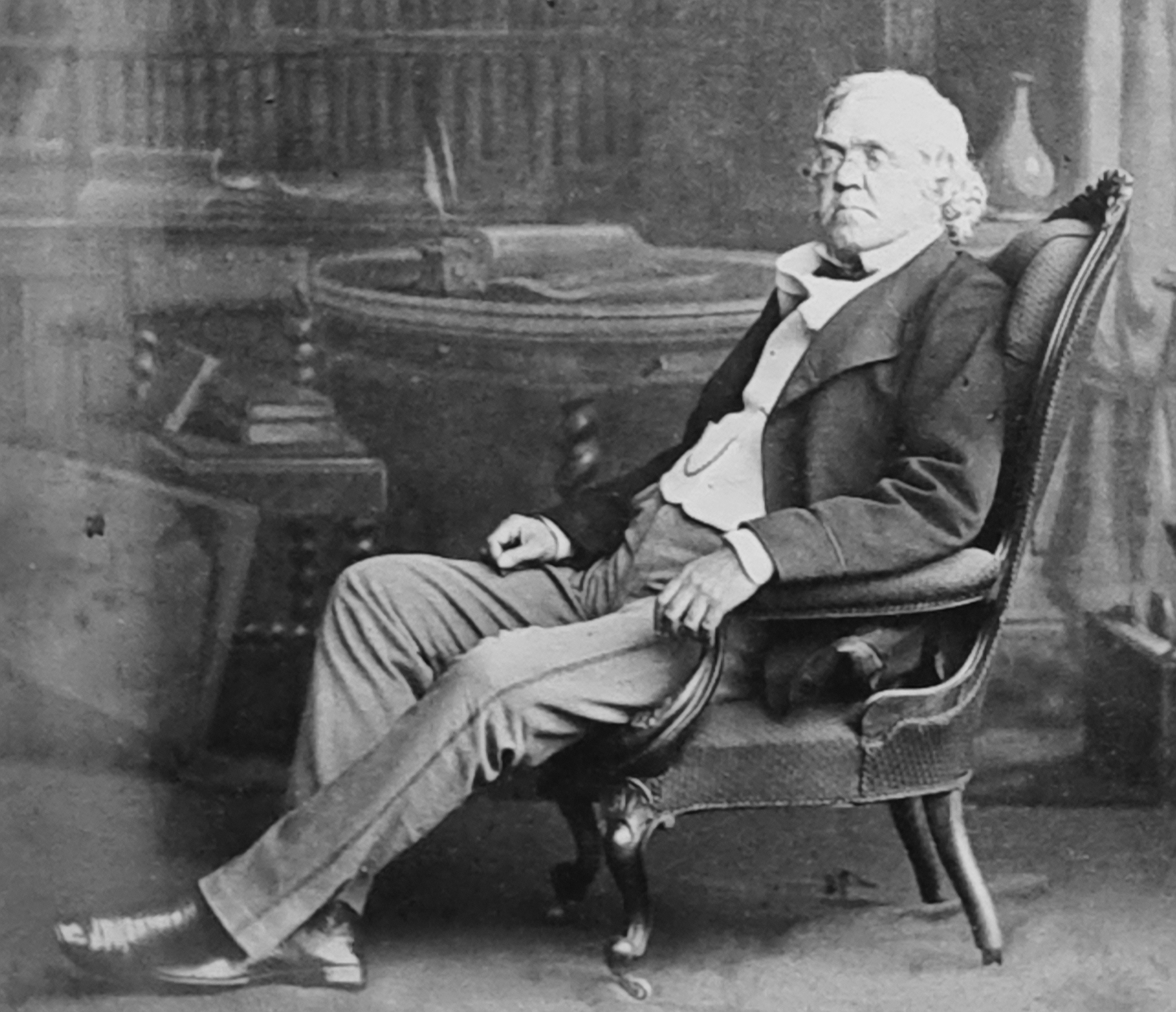
Portrait of William Makepeace Thackeray, c. 1863

He remained "at the top of the tree", as he put it, for the rest of his life, during which he produced several large novels, notably Pendennis, The Newcomes, and The History of Henry Esmond, despite various illnesses, including a near-fatal one that struck him in 1849 in the middle of writing Pendennis. He twice visited the United States on lecture tours during this period. Longtime Washington journalist B.P. Poore described Thackeray on one of those tours:

The citizens of Washington enjoyed a rare treat when Thackeray came to deliver his lectures on the English essayists, wits, and humorists of the eighteenth century. Accustomed to the spread-eagle style of oratory too prevalent at the Capitol, they were delighted with the pleasing voice and easy manner of the burly, gray-haired, rosy-cheeked Briton, who made no gestures, but stood most of the time with his hands in his pockets, as if he were talking with friends at a cozy fireside.

Thackeray also gave lectures in London on the English humorists of the eighteenth century, and on the first four Hanoverian monarchs. The latter series was published in book form in 1861 as The Four Georges: Sketches of Manners, Morals, Court, and Town Life .

=== Failed candidate for the Liberal Party ===
In July 1857, Thackeray stood unsuccessfully as a Liberal for the city of Oxford in Parliament. Although not the most fiery agitator, Thackeray was always a decided liberal in his politics, and he promised to vote for the ballot in extension of the suffrage and was ready to accept triennial parliaments. He was narrowly beaten by Cardwell, who received 1,070 votes, as against 1,005 for Thackeray.

=== Magazine editor ===
In 1860, Thackeray became editor of the newly established Cornhill Magazine, but he was never comfortable in the role, preferring to contribute to the magazine as the writer of a column called "Roundabout Papers".

=== Health problems ===
Thackeray's health worsened during the 1850s, and he was plagued by a recurring stricture of the urethra that laid him up for days at a time. He also felt that he had lost much of his creative impetus. He worsened matters by excessive eating and drinking and avoiding exercise, though he enjoyed riding (he kept a horse). He has been described as "the greatest literary glutton who ever lived". His main activity apart from writing was "gutting and gorging". He could not break his addiction to spicy peppers, further ruining his digestion.

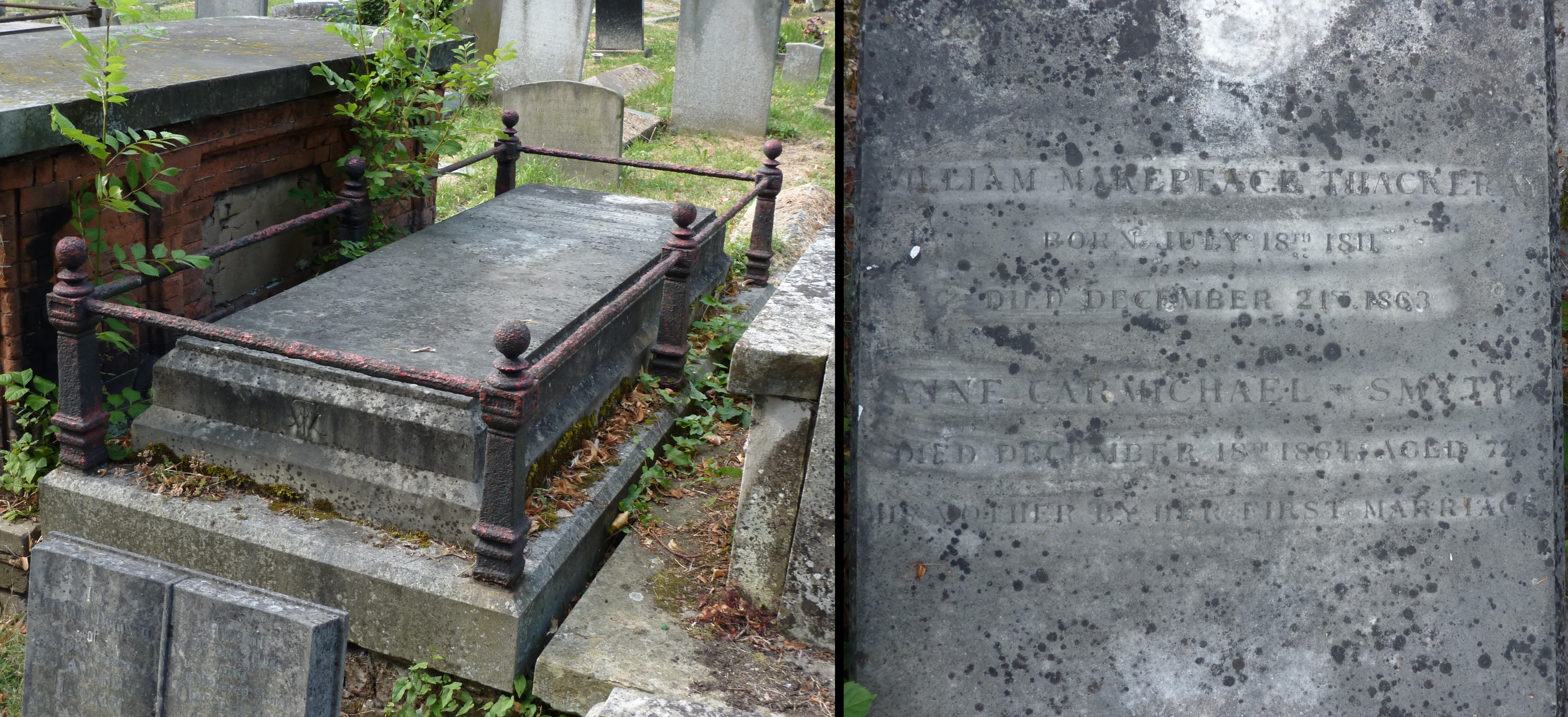
Thackeray's grave at Kensal Green Cemetery, London, photographed in 2014

=== Death and funeral ===
On 23 December 1863, after returning from dining out and before dressing for bed, he suffered a stroke. He was found dead in his bed the following morning. His death at the age of fifty-two was unexpected and shocked his family, his friends and the reading public. An estimated 7,000 people attended his funeral at Kensington Gardens. He was buried on 29 December at Kensal Green Cemetery, and a memorial bust sculpted by Marochetti can be found in Westminster Abbey.

== Works ==
- The Yellowplush Papers (1837)
- Catherine (1839–1840)
- A Shabby Genteel Story (1840)
- The Paris Sketchbook (1840)
- Second Funeral of Napoleon (1841)
- The Irish Sketchbook (1842)
- The Luck of Barry Lyndon (1844)
- Notes of a Journey from Cornhill to Grand Cairo (1846)
- Mrs. Perkins's Ball (1846), under the name M. A. Titmarsh
- Stray Papers: Being Stories, Reviews, Verses, and Sketches (1821–1847)
- The Book of Snobs (1846–1848)
- Vanity Fair (1847–1848)
- Pendennis (1848–1850)
- Rebecca and Rowena (1850) (a parody sequel to "Ivanhoe")
- Men's Wives (1852)
- The History of Henry Esmond (1852)
- The English Humorists of the Eighteenth Century (1853)
- The Newcomes (1854–1855)
- The Rose and the Ring (1854–1855)
- The Virginians (1857–1859)
- Lovel the Widower (1860)
- Four Georges (1860–1861)
- The Adventures of Philip (1861–1862)
- Roundabout Papers (1863)
- Denis Duval (1864)
- Ballads (1869)
- Burlesques (1869)
- The Orphan of Pimlico (1876)

Thackeray began as a satirist and parodist, writing works that displayed a sneaking fondness for roguish upstarts, such as Becky Sharp in Vanity Fair and the title characters of The Luck of Barry Lyndon and Catherine. In his earliest works, written under such pseudonyms as Charles James Yellowplush, Michael Angelo Titmarsh and George Savage Fitz-Boodle, he tended towards savagery in his attacks on high society, military prowess, the institution of marriage and hypocrisy.

One of his earliest works, "Timbuctoo" (1829), contains a burlesque upon the subject set for the Cambridge Chancellor's Medal for English Verse. (The contest was won by Tennyson with a poem of the same title, "Timbuctoo".) Thackeray's writing career really began with a series of satirical sketches now usually known as The Yellowplush Papers, which appeared in Fraser's Magazine beginning in 1837. These were adapted for BBC Radio 4 in 2009, with Adam Buxton playing Charles Yellowplush.

Between May 1839 and February 1840 Fraser's published the work sometimes considered Thackeray's first novel, Catherine. Originally intended as a satire of the Newgate school of crime fiction, it ended up being more of a picaresque tale. He also began work, never finished, on the novel later published as A Shabby Genteel Story.

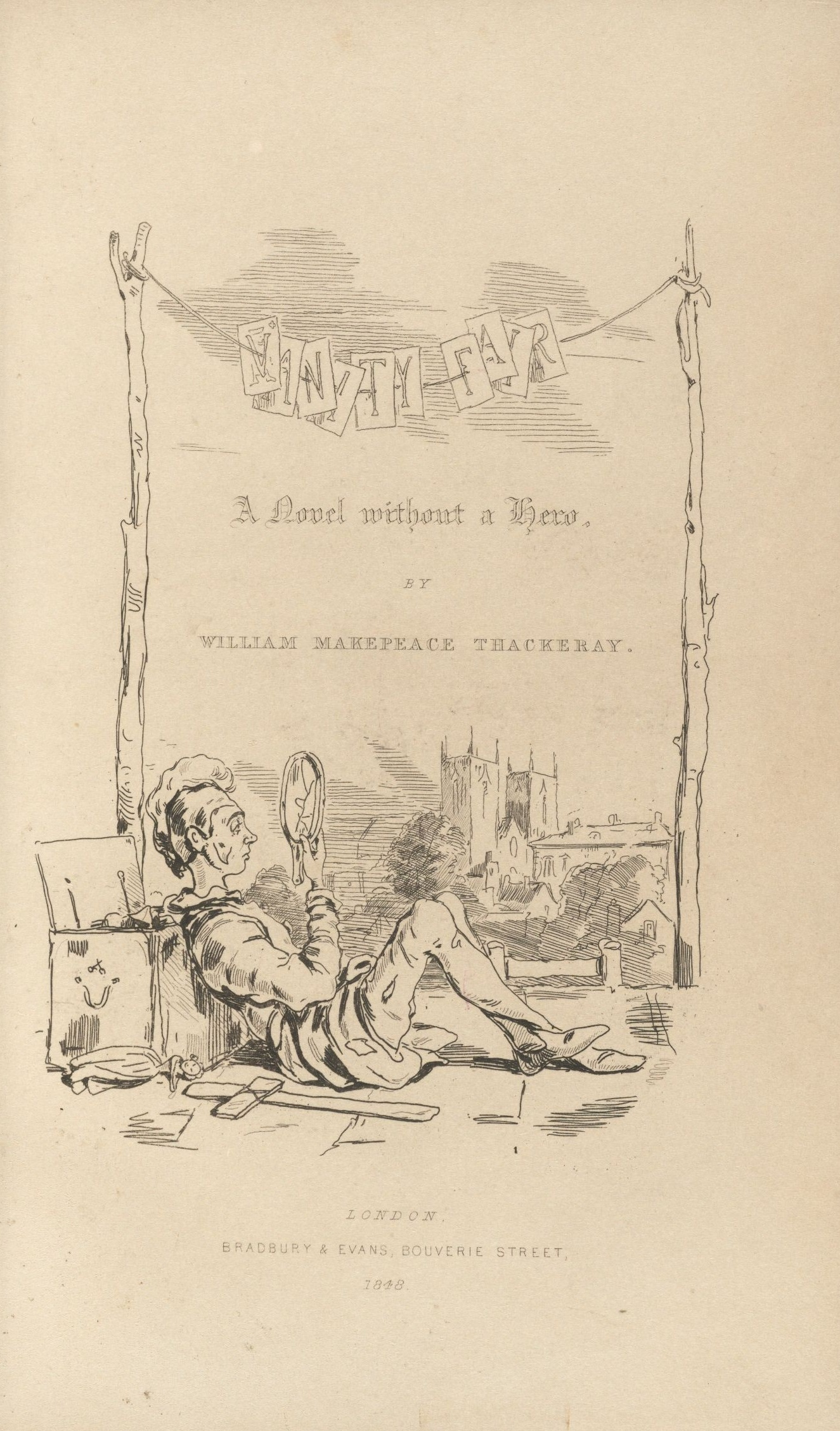
Title-page to Vanity Fair, drawn by Thackeray, who furnished the illustrations for many of his own books

Along with The Luck of Barry Lyndon, Thackeray is probably best known now for Vanity Fair. Literary theorist Kornelije Kvas wrote that "the meteoric rise of the heroine of Vanity Fair Rebecca Sharp is a satirical presentation of the striving for profit, power, and social recognition of the new middle class. Old and new members of the middle class strive to emulate the lifestyle of the higher class (noblemen and landowners), and thereby to increase their material possessions and to own luxury objects. In Vanity Fair, one can observe a greater degree of violation of moral values among members of the new middle class, for the decline of morality is proportionate to the degree of closeness of the individual to the market and its laws." In contrast, his large novels from the period after Vanity Fair, which were once described by Henry James as examples of "loose baggy monsters", have largely faded from view, perhaps because they reflect a mellowing in Thackeray, who had become so successful with his satires on society that he seemed to lose his zest for attacking it. These later works include Pendennis, a Bildungsroman depicting the coming of age of Arthur Pendennis, an alter ego of Thackeray, who also features as the narrator of two later novels, The Newcomes and The Adventures of Philip. The Newcomes is noteworthy for its critical portrayal of the "marriage market", while Philip is known for its semi-autobiographical depiction of Thackeray's early life, in which he partially regains some of his early satirical power.

Also notable among the later novels is The History of Henry Esmond, in which Thackeray tried to write a novel in the style of the eighteenth century, a period that held great appeal for him. About this novel, there have been found evident analogies—in the fundamental structure of the plot; in the psychological outlines of the main characters; in frequent episodes; and in the use of metaphors—to Ippolito Nievo's Confessions of an Italian. Nievo wrote his novel during his stay in Milan where, in the "Ambrosiana" library, The History of Henry Esmond was available, just published.

Not only Esmond but also Barry Lyndon and Catherine are set in that period, as is the sequel to Esmond, The Virginians, which is set partially in North America and includes George Washington as a character who nearly kills one of the protagonists in a duel.

== Family ==
=== Parents ===
Thackeray's father, Richmond Thackeray, was born at South Mimms and went to India in 1798 at age sixteen as a writer (civil servant) with the East India Company. Richmond's father's name was also William Makepeace Thackeray. Richmond fathered a daughter, Sarah Redfield, in 1804 with Charlotte Sophia Rudd, his possibly Eurasian mistress, and both mother and daughter were named in his will. Such liaisons were common among gentlemen of the East India Company, and it formed no bar to his later courting and marrying William's mother.

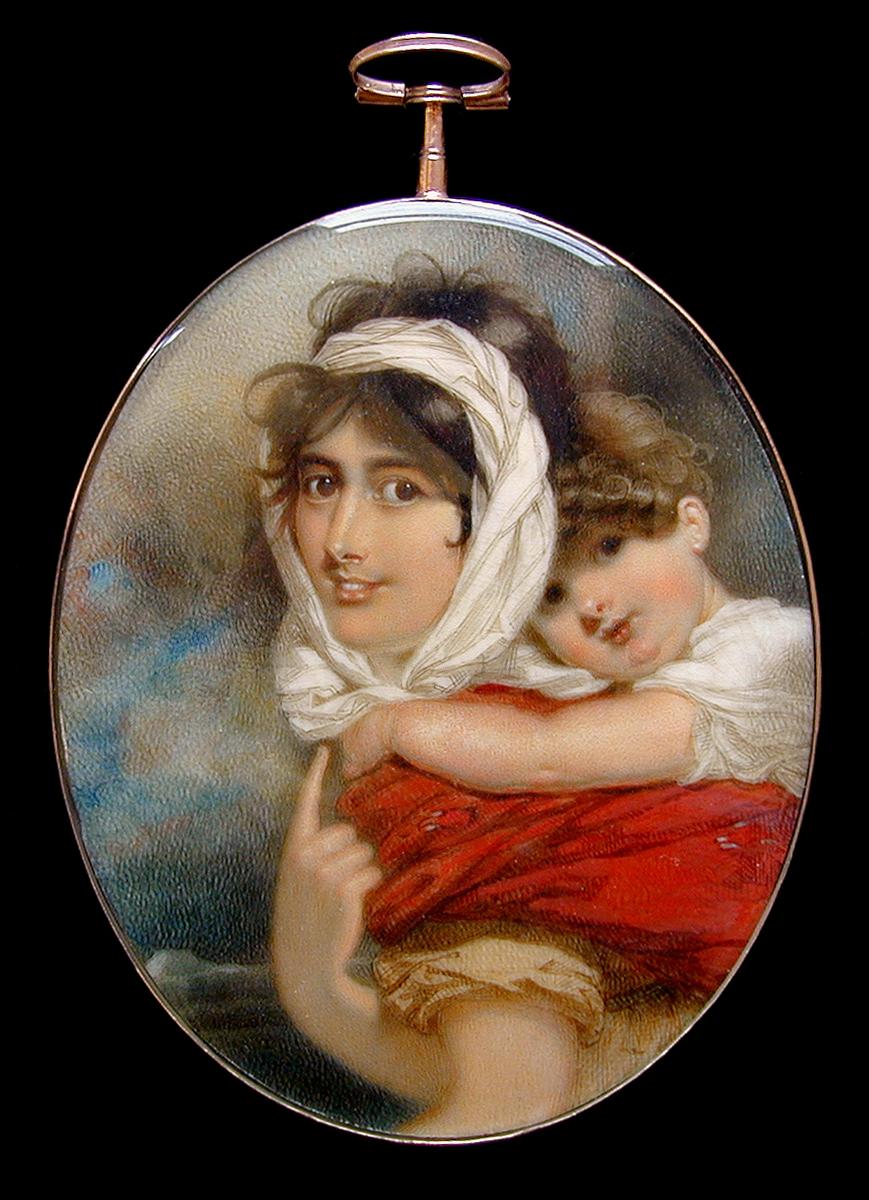
Anne Becher and William Makepeace Thackeray by George Chinnery, c. 1813

Thackeray's mother, Anne Becher (born 1792), was "one of the reigning beauties of the day" and a daughter of John Harmon Becher, Collector of the South 24 Parganas district (d. Calcutta, 1800), of an old Bengal civilian family "noted for the tenderness of its women". Anne Becher, her sister Harriet and their widowed mother, also Harriet, had been sent back to India by her authoritarian guardian grandmother, Ann Becher, in 1809 on the Earl Howe. Anne's grandmother had told her that the man she loved, Henry Carmichael-Smyth, an ensign in the Bengal Engineers whom she met at an Assembly Ball in 1807 in Bath, had died, while he was told that Anne was no longer interested in him. Neither of these assertions was true. Though Carmichael-Smyth was from a distinguished Scottish military family, Anne's grandmother went to extreme lengths to prevent their marriage. Surviving family letters state that she wanted a better match for her granddaughter.

Anne Becher and Richmond Thackeray were married in Calcutta on 13 October 1810. Their only child, William, was born on 18 July 1811. There is a fine miniature portrait of Anne Becher Thackeray and William Makepeace Thackeray, aged about two, done in Madras by George Chinnery c. 1813.

Anne's family's deception was unexpectedly revealed in 1812, when Richmond Thackeray unwittingly invited the supposedly dead Carmichael-Smyth to dinner. Five years later, after Richmond had died of a fever on 13 September 1815, Anne married Henry Carmichael-Smyth, on 13 March 1817. The couple moved to England in 1820, after having sent William off to school there more than three years earlier. The separation from his mother had a traumatic effect on the young Thackeray, which he discussed in his essay "On Letts's Diary" in The Roundabout Papers.

=== Descendants ===
Thackeray is the great-great-great-grandfather of the British comedian Al Murray

== Reputation and legacy ==
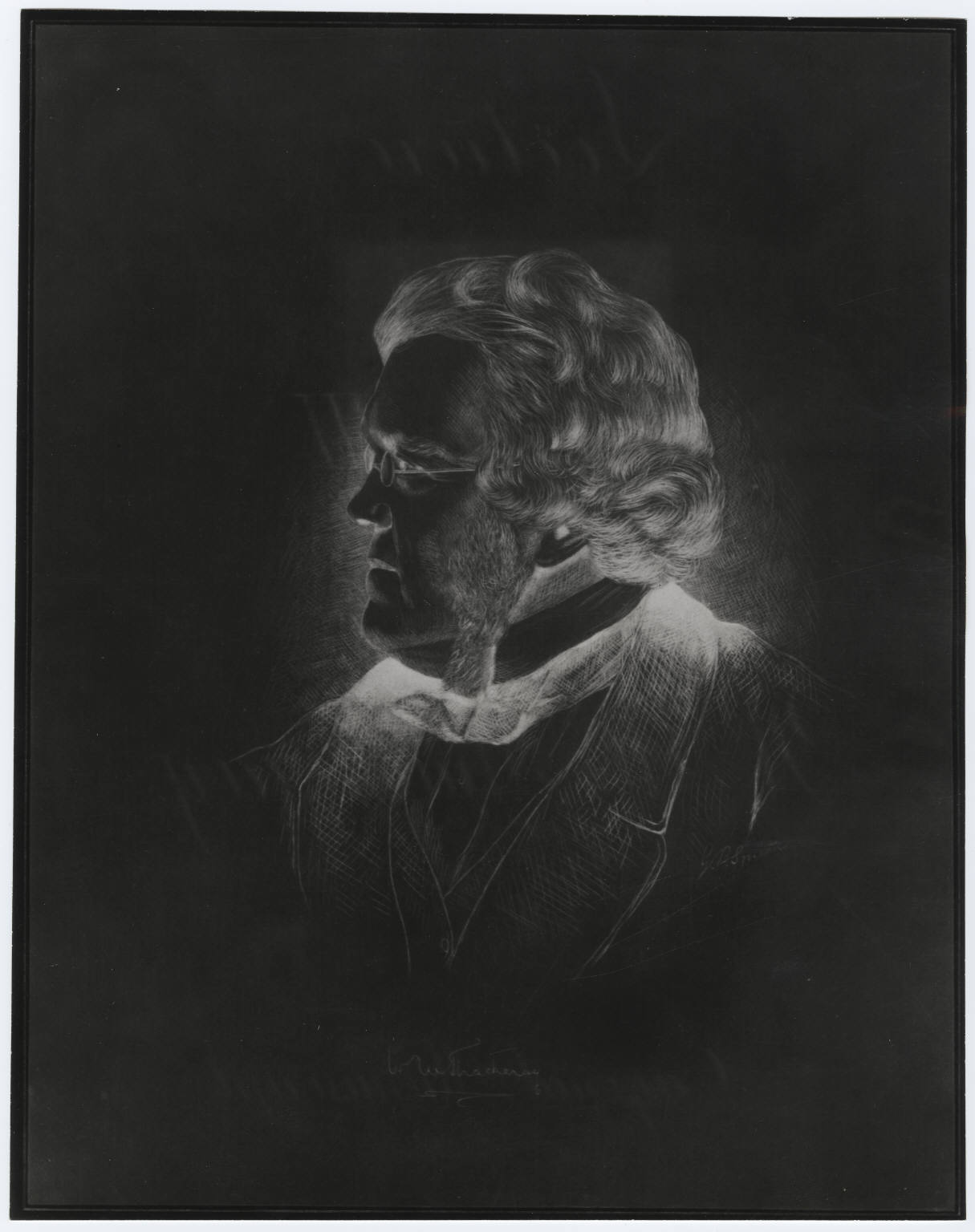
Etching of Thackeray, c. 1867

During the Victorian era, Thackeray was ranked second only to Charles Dickens, but he is now much less widely read and is known almost exclusively for Vanity Fair. The novel has become a fixture in university courses, and has been repeatedly adapted for the cinema and television.

In Thackeray's own day some commentators, such as Anthony Trollope, ranked his History of Henry Esmond as his greatest work, perhaps because it expressed Victorian values of duty and earnestness, as did some of his other later novels. It is perhaps for this reason that they have not survived as well as Vanity Fair, which satirises those values.

Thackeray saw himself as writing in the realistic tradition, and distinguished his work from the exaggerations and sentimentality of Dickens. Some later commentators have accepted this self-evaluation and seen him as a realist, but others note his inclination to use eighteenth-century narrative techniques, such as digressions and direct addresses to the reader, and argue that through them he frequently disrupts the illusion of reality. The school of Henry James, with its emphasis on maintaining that illusion, marked a break with Thackeray's techniques.

Charlotte Brontë dedicated the second edition of Jane Eyre to Thackeray.

In 1887 the Royal Society of Arts unveiled a blue plaque to commemorate Thackeray at the house at 2 Palace Green, London, that had been built for him in the 1860s. It is now the location of the Israeli Embassy.

Thackeray's former home in Tunbridge Wells, Kent, is now a restaurant named after the author.

Thackeray was also a member of the Albion Lodge of the Ancient Order of Druids at Oxford.

Thackeray, alongside Samuel Taylor Coleridge, has multiple roads in Clevedon, Somerset named after him. The town's coastal footpath, Poets' Walk, was also dedicated to them, as well as Alfred Tennyson.

=== Connection to Balasaheb Thackeray ===
Popular Indian Marathi politician Bal Thackeray's father Keshav Sitaram Thackeray was an admirer of William; Keshav later changed his surname from Panvelkar to "Thackeray".

== List of works ==
=== Series ===
Arthur Pendennis and the Marquis of Steyne

1. The History of Henry Esmond (1852) – ISBN 0-14-143916-5
2. The Virginians (1857–1859) – ISBN 1-4142-3952-1
3. The Luck of Barry Lyndon (1844) – ISBN 0-19-283628-5
4. Vanity Fair (1847–1848) – ISBN 0-14-062085-0
5. A Shabby Genteel Story (Unfinished) (1840) – ISBN 1-4101-0509-1
6. Pendennis (1848–1850) – ISBN 1-4043-8659-9
7. The Newcomes (1854–1855) – ISBN 0-460-87495-0
8. The Adventures of Philip (1861–1862) – ISBN 1-4101-0510-5

The Christmas Books of Mr M. A. Titmarsh
Thackeray wrote and illustrated five Christmas books as "by Mr M. A. Titmarsh". They were collected under the pseudonymous title and his real name no later than 1868 by Smith, Elder & Co.

The Rose and the Ring was dated 1855 in its first edition, published for Christmas 1854.

1. Mrs. Perkins's Ball (1846), as by M. A. Titmarsh
2. Our Street
3. Doctor Birch and His Young Friends
4. The Kickleburys on the Rhine (Christmas 1850) – "a new picture book, drawn and written by Mr M. A. Titmarsh"
5. The Rose and the Ring (Christmas 1854) – ISBN 1-4043-2741-X

=== Novels ===
- Catherine (1839–1840) – ISBN 1-4065-0055-0 (originally credited to "Ikey Solomons, Esq. Junior")
- Men's Wives (1852) – ISBN 978-1-77545-023-8
- Lovel the Widower
- Denis Duval (unfinished) (1864) – ISBN 1-4191-1561-8

=== Novellas ===
- Elizabeth Brownbridge
- Sultan Stork
- Little Spitz
- The Yellowplush Papers (1837) – ISBN 0-8095-9676-8
- The Professor, loosely based on the life of Edward Dando
- Miss Löwe
- The Tremendous Adventures of Major Gahagan
- The Fatal Boots
- Cox’s Diary
- The Bedford-Row Conspiracy
- The History of Samuel Titmarsh and the Great Hoggarty Diamond
- The Fitz-Boodle Papers
- The Diary of C. Jeames de la Pluche, Esq. with his letters
- A Legend of the Rhine
- A Little Dinner at Timmins's
- Rebecca and Rowena (1850), a parodic sequel to Ivanhoe – ISBN 1-84391-018-7
- Bluebeard's Ghost

=== Sketches and satires ===
- The Irish Sketchbook (2 Volumes) (1843) – ISBN 0-86299-754-2
- The Book of Snobs (1846–1848), which popularised that term – ISBN 0-8095-9672-5
- Flore et Zephyr
- Roundabout Papers
- Some Roundabout Papers
- Charles Dickens in France
- Character Sketches
- Sketches and Travels in London (Bradbury & Evans, 1856)
- Mr. Brown's Letters
- The Proser
- Miscellanies

=== Play ===
- The Wolves and the Lamb

=== Travel writing ===
- Notes of a Journey from Cornhill to Grand Cairo (1846), under the name Mr M. A. Titmarsh.
- The Paris Sketchbook (1840), featuring Roger Bontemps
- The Little Travels and Roadside Sketches (1840)

=== Other non-fiction ===
- The English Humorists of the 18th Century (1853)
- Four Georges (1860–1861) – ISBN 978-1410203007
- Roundabout Papers (1863)
- The Orphan of Pimlico (1876)
- Sketches and Travels in London
- Stray Papers: Being Stories, Reviews, Verses, and Sketches (1821–1847)
- Literary Essays
- The English Humorists of the 18th century: a series of lectures (1867)
- Ballads
- Miscellanies
- Stories
- Burlesques
- Character Sketches
- Critical Reviews
- Second Funeral of Napoleon

=== Poems ===
- The Pigtail
- The Mahogany Tree (1847)

== See also ==
- Barry Lyndon, the 1975 film adaptation by Stanley Kubrick
- The Rose and the Ring, the 1986 film adaptation by Jerzy Gruza
- "Sorrows of Werther"

== Bibliography ==
- Aplin, John (ed), The Correspondence and Journals of the Thackeray Family, 5 vols., Pickering & Chatto, 2011.
- Aplin, John, The Inheritance of Genius – A Thackeray Family Biography, 1798–1875, Lutterworth Press, 2010.
- Aplin, John, Memory and Legacy – A Thackeray Family Biography, 1876–1919, Lutterworth Press, 2011.
- Bloom, Abigail Burnham; Maynard, John, eds. (1994). Anne Thackeray Ritchie: Journals and letters. Columbus: Ohio State Univ. Press. ISBN 9780814206386.
- Catalan, Zelma. The Politics of Irony in Thackeray’s Mature Fiction: Vanity Fair, Henry Esmond, The Newcomes. Sofia (Bulgaria), 2010, 250 pp.
- Elwin, Malcolm. Thackeray: A Personality. London: Jonathan Cape, 1932.
- Goldfarb, Sheldon. Catherine: A Story (The Thackeray Edition). University of Michigan Press, 1999.
- Ferris, Ina. William Makepeace Thackeray. Boston: Twayne, 1983.
- Forster, Margaret. William Makepeace Thackeray: Memoirs of Victorian Gentleman. London: Secker & Warburg, 1978.
- Jack, Adolphus Alfred. Thackeray: A Study. London: Macmillan, 1895.
- Melville, Lewis. The Life of William Makepeace Thackeray. London: Hutchinson & Co., 1899.
- Monsarrat, Ann. An Uneasy Victorian: Thackeray the Man, 1811–1863. London: Cassell, 1980.
- Peters, Catherine. Thackeray: A Writer's Life. Sutton Publishing, 1999.
- Peters, Catherine. Thackeray’s Universe: Shifting Worlds of Imagination and Reality. New York: Oxford University Press, 1987.
- Phillipps, K. C. The Language of Thackeray. The Language Library, London: Andre Deutsch, 1978.
- Prawer, Siegbert S.: Breeches and Metaphysics: Thackeray's German Discourse. Oxford: Legenda, 1997.
- Prawer, Siegbert S.: Israel at Vanity Fair: Jews and Judaism in the Writings of W. M. Thackeray. Leiden: Brill, 1992.
- Prawer, Siegbert S.: W. M. Thackeray's European sketch books: a study of literary and graphic portraiture. P. Lang, 2000.
- Ray, Gordon N. Thackeray: The Uses of Adversity, 1811–1846. New York: McGraw-Hill, 1955.
- Ray, Gordon N. Thackeray: The Age of Wisdom, 1847–1863. New York: McGraw-Hill, 1957.
- Ritchie, H.T. Thackeray and His Daughter. Harper and Brothers, 1924.
- Rodríguez Espinosa, Marcos (1998) Traducción y recepción como procesos de mediación cultural: 'Vanity Fair' en España. Málaga: Servicio de Publicaciones de la Universidad de Málaga.
- Shillingsburg, Peter. William Makepeace Thackeray: A Literary Life. Basingstoke: Palgrave, 2001.
- Taylor, D. J. Thackeray. London: Chatto & Windus, 1999.
- Williams, Ioan M. Thackeray. London: Evans, 1968.
