= Pendennis =

1848–1850 novel by William Makepeace Thackeray

The History of Pendennis
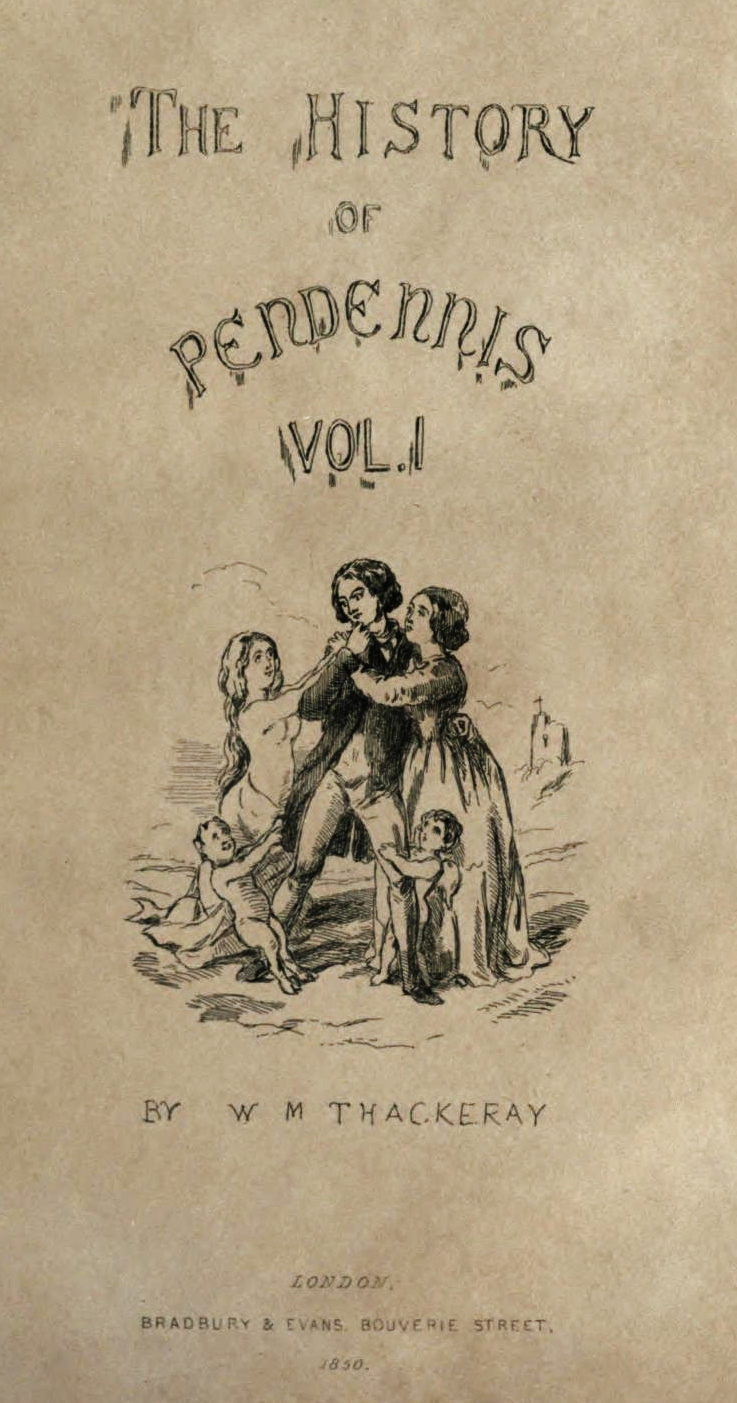
- First edition title-page with an illustration drawn by Thackeray himself (1850)
- Author: William Makepeace Thackeray
- Illustrator: William Makepeace Thackeray
- Language: English
- Genre: Bildungsroman
- Set in: England
- Publisher: Bradbury and Evans (bound edition)
- Publication date: November 1848 to December 1850
- Publication place: United Kingdom
- Media type: Print

The History of Pendennis: His Fortunes and Misfortunes, His Friends and His Greatest Enemy (1848–1850) is a novel by the English author William Makepeace Thackeray. It is set in 19th-century England, particularly in London. The main hero is a young English gentleman Arthur Pendennis, who is born in the country and sets out for London to seek his place in life and society. As such, it is generally categorized as a bildungsroman. Thackeray wrote the novel in monthly installments over two years and, in line with his other works, most notably Vanity Fair, it offers an insightful and satiric picture of human character and aristocratic society. The characters include the snobbish social hanger-on Major Pendennis and the tipsy Captain Costigan.

== Plot summary ==
Arthur Pendennis ("Pen" to his friends) is the only child of a prosperous physician and former apothecary now deceased. He and his foster sister Laura are raised in the village of Fairoaks by his indulgent mother, Mrs Helen Pendennis. The family has risen to gentility in the past generation or two but is not wealthy: the late Mr Pendennis left only a house and investments producing about 500 pounds a year. The Pendennises, however, claim descent from an ancient family, and Arthur's uncle Major Pendennis, though he has only his retired Army pay, associates with wealthy and titled people. As Pen and Laura grow up, Mrs Pendennis tells them she hopes they will marry someday.

At age 18, Pen falls in love with an actress, Emily Fotheringay (a stage name), who is about ten years his senior. Emily's father, Captain Costigan, believes Pen is rich and wants Pen to marry his daughter, but Pen's mother is horrified. She summons Major Pendennis from London, and the Major derails the marriage simply by telling Costigan his nephew is not rich. Emily jilts Pen.

Pen, heartbroken, leaves home to study at St Boniface's college in Oxbridge. There he lives extravagantly, unwittingly causing his mother and Laura to live in near poverty. After two years, Pen fails his final examination and remorsefully returns home, where his mother and Laura forgive him and Laura sacrifices her small personal fortune to pay Pen's debts. He soon returns to Oxbridge, retakes the exam, and obtains a degree, but returns to Fairoaks as his mother thinks earning a living is both beneath her son and harmful to his health.

Soon a large house in the neighbourhood that has stood empty for years is reoccupied by its owners, the Clavering family, consisting of Sir Francis, a baronet and Member of Parliament addicted to gambling; his rich and kindly but low-born wife, whose father earned his fortune in India; their young son; and Lady Clavering's daughter from her first marriage, Blanche Amory. The Pendennises become friendly with the Claverings and Pen becomes infatuated with Blanche, but the flirtation does not last long. To please his mother, Pen at this point proposes to Laura but she turns him down essentially because she thinks he is not mature enough.

Pen then sets out for London, where he meets George Warrington, a journalist, with whom Pen takes cheap lodgings and who helps Pen get started as a writer. Pen achieves some success and starts to support himself, swearing he'll take no more of his mother's or Laura's money.

The Clavering family also comes up to London, where they live very well, and Blanche continues to flirt with Pen and many other men. One of them, Pen's college friend Harry Foker, falls in love with Blanche but cannot propose to her as his father will disinherit him unless he marries his cousin Ann. Pen—by now rather cynical about love and life—toys with the idea of a marriage of convenience to Blanche, and his uncle encourages him in this, but—partly because he knows that Harry Foker loves Blanche—Pen does not propose. Foker leaves England for a year or two, unable to marry Blanche but unwilling to marry his cousin.

A new character, Colonel Altamont, is introduced at this point: he knows a secret about the Clavering family and uses it to extort money from the baronet. Major Pendennis meets Colonel Altamont, recognises him from his Army service in India, and knows that Altamont is really Lady Clavering's supposedly dead first husband Mr Amory. He is an escaped convict and a murderer as well. Major Pendennis, however, does not act on his knowledge. In addition to being blackmailed, Sir Francis Clavering loses a tremendous sum of money at the races and hides from his wife and creditors in an obscure part of London.

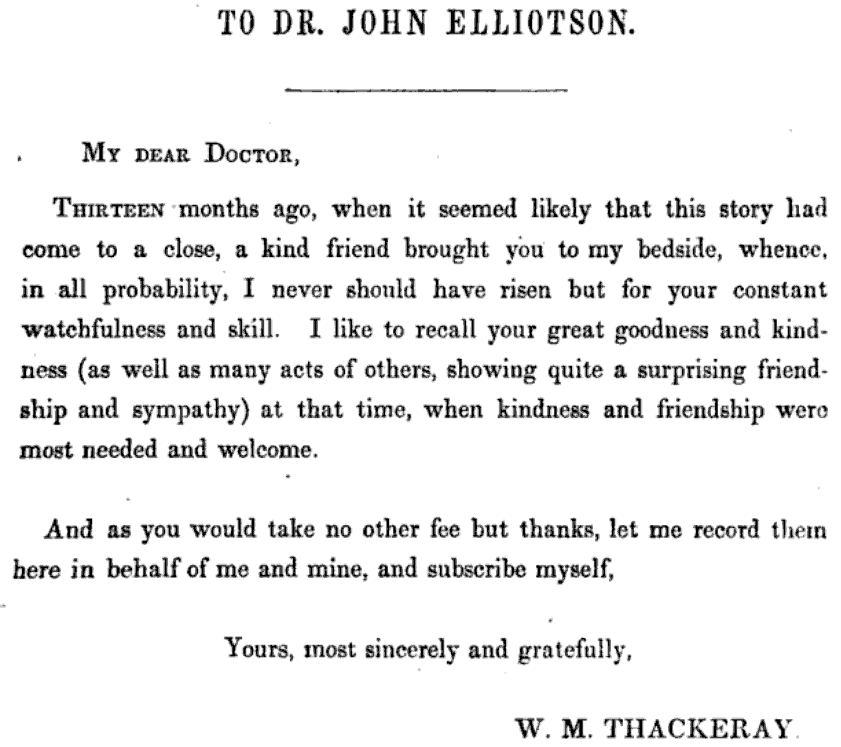
Thackeray's dedication to his friend John Elliotson, the editor of The Zoist—the model for Dr Goodenough, in The Adventures of Philip (1862)—who attended him when suffering a life-threatening illness 1849.

Meanwhile, Pen meets Fanny Bolton, who is pretty and young, but ignorant and lower-class. They fall in love a little, but after a very short and innocent relationship, Pen decides not to see her any more for the good of both. Brooding and keeping to his comfortless room to avoid seeing Fanny, Pen falls very ill. When malicious gossip reaches Helen and Laura that Pen is "entangled" with a girl of low station, they rush to his side: they find Fanny in his room, where she has just arrived to nurse him, but Helen and Laura think the worst and treat Fanny very rudely. Pen, unconscious, is unable to defend Fanny and himself.

Recovering after several weeks of illness, Pen takes a journey with his mother, Laura, and Warrington, who falls in love with Laura but cannot marry her because of his own catastrophic early marriage. He is separated from his venal wife and her children of whom he is only legally, not biologically, the father. He supports them but does not see them, and he has no ambition because if he earns more money, his wife will demand it. Helen's health deteriorates because of her belief in Pen's immoral connection with Fanny. Pen finally discovers how Helen treated Fanny; he is angry at his mother and tells her he and Fanny are innocent. She is overjoyed to hear it, and soon mother and son forgive each other. Helen's health is too shaken and she dies soon afterward.

Pen thus comes into possession of the family property of 500 pounds a year. He leases his house at Fairoaks to tenants and returns to London, while Laura goes to live as companion to a Lady Rockminster. Pen does send a small amount of money to Fanny Bolton with his thanks; she eventually marries a Mr Huxter, the man who had started the gossip about her and Pen.

Major Pendennis, still hoping to arrange a profitable marriage between Pen and Blanche Amory, meets Sir Francis and threatens to divulge his secret—that he is not really married to Lady Clavering—if Sir Francis will not retire and turn over his seat in Parliament to Pen. Sir Francis consents. Major Pendennis' shrewd valet Morgan overhears the conversation and makes plans to extort everyone—the Major, Pen, Altamont, Sir Francis, and Lady Clavering. When Morgan tries this on Major Pendennis, however, the Major will not stand for it, as he has as much to threaten Morgan with (theft) as Morgan has to threaten others with.

At this point Pen has finally become engaged to Blanche, though they do not love each other. Then he learns, through Morgan, of the scandal concerning the Claverings. Pen does what he considers the honourable thing: he maintains his engagement with Blanche but refuses her family money and the seat in Parliament.

Now Harry Foker comes back into the picture: his father has died and his fiancee-cousin Ann has eloped with another man, leaving Harry rich and free to marry as he likes. He returns to England and proposes to Blanche. She accepts because he is richer than Pen. On learning that Blanche has broken their engagement, Pen proposes to Laura, whom he has come to love, and is accepted, because she has long loved him—even when she refused his first marriage proposal.

The secret of the Clavering family finally becomes known to everybody and Harry Foker breaks his engagement to Blanche—not because of her disreputable father, but because she deceived him and does not love him. There is one final surprise: Altamont/Amory, although he is Blanche's father, was bigamously married to several women before he "married" Blanche's mother, so the Clavering marriage is legal after all, but Blanche is illegitimate. Blanche leaves for Paris, where she apparently marries a confidence trickster. Foker remains unmarried. Pen and Laura marry; soon their income increases, and he enters Parliament through his own honest efforts.

== Publication history ==
Thackeray started working on Pendennis as soon as he finished Vanity Fair. It was published as a serial and later sold in book form. It was printed in 24 monthly parts between November 1848 and December 1850 by Bradbury & Evans in London. The publication was paused for 3 months following the author’s illness after the September 1849 part.

No. 1 (November 1848) Ch. 1–3
No. 2 (December 1848) Ch. 4-6
No. 3 (January 1849) Ch. 7-10
No. 4 (February 1849) Ch. 11–14
No. 5 (March 1849) Ch. 15–16
No. 6 (April 1849) Ch. 17-19
No. 7 (May 1849) Ch. 20-22
No. 8 (June 1849) Ch. 23-25
No. 9 (July 1849) Ch. 26-28
No. 10 (August 1849) Ch. 29-31
No. 11 (September 1849) Ch. 32-35
No. 12 (January 1850) Ch. 36-38 (publication resumed after 3 months due to Thackeray’s illness)
No. 13 (February 1850) Ch. 39-41
No. 14 (March 1850) Ch. 42-44
No. 15 (April 1850) Ch. 45-47
No. 16 (May 1850) Ch. 48-51
No. 17 (June 1850) Ch. 52-54
No. 18 (July 1850) Ch. 55-57
No. 19 (August 1850) Ch. 58-60
No. 20 (September 1850) 61-63
No. 21 (October 1850) 64-66
No. 22 (November 1850) 67-70
No. 23/24 (December 1850) 71-75

== Adaptations ==
- Pendennis (1986), BBC Radio 4 broadcast an adaptation of the novel by Peter Buckman, starring Dominic Guard as Arthur Pendennis.

== Recent editions ==
- Classic Books, 1999. ISBN 1-58201-392-6.
- Michigan Historical Reprint Series, Scholarly Publishing Office, University of Michigan Library, 2005. ISBN 1-4255-4211-5. http://name.umdl.umich.edu/AAN4217.0001.001
