= The Book of Snobs =

1846–1848 novel by William Makepeace Thackeray

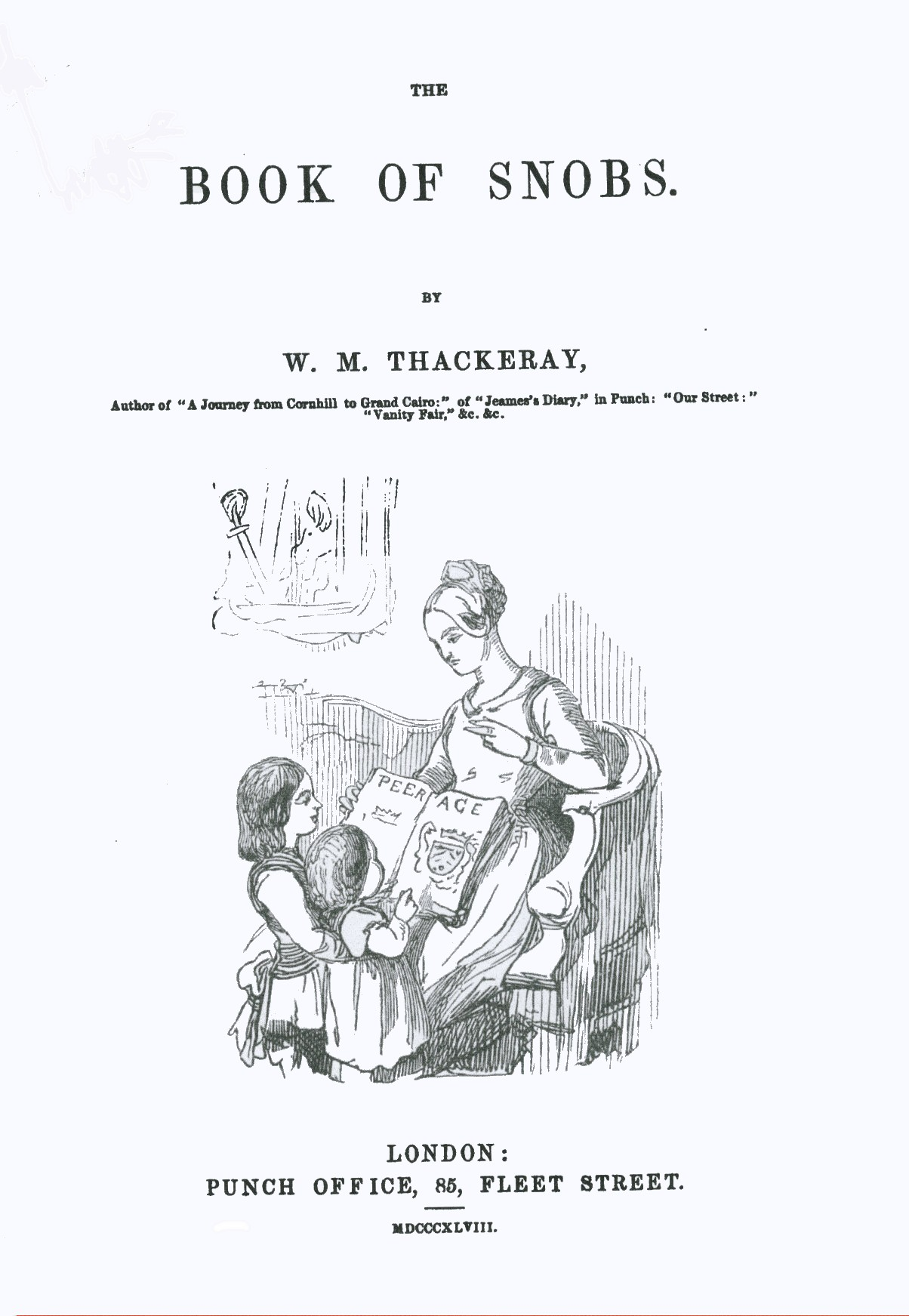
- Title page of the first publication
- Author: William Makepeace Thackeray
- Illustrator: William Makepeace Thackeray
- Language: English
- Publisher: Punch Office
- Publication date: 1846–1848
- Publication place: United Kingdom
- Media type: Print
- ISBN: 0-8095-9672-5

The Book of Snobs is a collection of satirical works by William Makepeace Thackeray published in book form in 1848, the same year as his more famous Vanity Fair. The pieces first appeared in fifty-three weekly pieces from February 28, 1846 to February 27, 1847, as "The Snobs of England, by one of themselves", in the satirical magazine Punch. The pieces, which were immensely popular and thrust Thackeray into widespread public view, were "rigorously revised" before their collection in book form and omitted the numbers which dealt with then current political issues (numbers 17–23).

The Book of Snobs expressed Thackeray's conscious and unconscious views on the snobbery prevalent in Victorian society. Thackeray initially adopted several pen names to remain anonymous, including the pseudonyms: Théophole Wagstaff, Charles Yelowplush, Major George Fitz-Boodle, Michael Angelo Titmarsh, and Ikey Solomons, Miss Tickletoby, Manager of the Performance, Arthur Pendennis, Timothy Titcomb, and Solomon Pacifico. Thackeray only admitted authorship of the work in the second edition of Memoirs of Barry Lyndon (1856). The book took a critical view of the various groups of English snobs at home and abroad, particularly in France, and highlighted the human tendency to give importance to trivial matters or to admire things of low value. Thackeray described these traits succinctly in two phrases: "give importance to unimportant things" or "meanly admire mean things".

Upon publication, the book received a range of reviews, from mixed to generally negative. While the book received a defence from Anthony Trollope, other prolific writers of the time were critical of its often harsh, satirical and iconoclastic commentary on English society. Nevertheless, its underlying message communicated a humanitarian and Christian-centric view.

The book has been translated into French several times, with notable versions by Georges Guiffrey in c. 1857, by Maurice Constantic-Weyer, and by Raymond Las Vergnas in 1945.

The term 'snob' was popularised by the publication of the Book of Snobs. This compilation was highly influential in clarifying the current connotations of the word and, in the words of academic and scholar Frédéric Rouvillois, in establishing "the baptism of snobbery".

== Origins of the word 'snob' ==
In the Dictionnaire du snobisme by Philippe Jullian, the term 'snob' is referenced: "the very sound of the word 'snob', which begins as a whistle and ends as a soap bubble, destined it for a great career in the realm of contempt and frivolity". This description is similar to Thackeray's coinage of the term, but he adds a moral connotation.

According to Wiktionary, the word originated from the late 18th century dialectal English term snob, meaning "cobbler," of unknown origin. Early senses of the word carried the meaning of "lower status"; it was then used to describe those seeking to imitate those of higher wealth or status. Folk etymology derives it from the Latin phrase sine nobilitate ("without nobility"), but early uses had no connection to this. The modern sense was popularized by William Makepeace Thackeray in The Book of Snobs (1848).
