= Brookfield =

Brookfield may refer to:

== Australia ==
- Brookfield, Queensland, a suburb of Brisbane
- Brookfield, Victoria

== Canada ==
- Brookfield, Manitoba, on Manitoba Highway 11
- Brookfield, Newfoundland and Labrador
- Brookfield, Nova Scotia
- Brookfield, Ontario, a neighbourhood of Sault Ste. Marie, Ontario
- Brookfield, Prince Edward Island

== New Zealand ==
- Brookfield, New Zealand, a suburb of Otumoetai in Tauranga, Bay of Plenty
- Brookfield Outdoor Education Centre, Wellington, a Scouts Aotearoa camp site which has hosted the New Zealand Rover moot

== United Kingdom ==
- Brookfield, Derbyshire, a location in Derbyshire, England
- Brookfield, Preston, in Lancashire, England
- Brookfield, Middlesbrough, a location in Middlesbrough, England
- Brookfield, Renfrewshire, Scotland
- Brookfield, a neighbourhood of Robroyston, Glasgow, Scotland
- Brookfield, County Fermanagh, a townland in County Fermanagh, Northern Ireland

== United States ==
- Brookfield, Colorado, a place in Baca County, Colorado
- Brookfield, Connecticut
  - Brookfield Center, Connecticut
  - Brookfield Center Historic District (Brookfield, Connecticut)
- Brookfield, Delaware, a place in Kent County, Delaware
- Brookfield, Georgia
- Brookfield, Illinois
  - Brookfield Zoo, in Brookfield, Illinois
- Brookfield, Indiana
- Brookfield, Massachusetts
  - Brookfield (CDP), Massachusetts
- Brookfield, Missouri
- Brookfield, New Hampshire
- Brookfield, New York
  - Brookfield (hamlet), New York
- Brookfield Center, Ohio, a CDP
- Brookfield, Chester County, Pennsylvania, a place in Pennsylvania
- Brookfield, Tioga County, Pennsylvania, a place in Pennsylvania
- Brookfield, Vermont
- Brookfield (plantation) of Virginia, a former plantation and fixture of Gabriel's Rebellion of 1800
- Brookfield, Wisconsin, a city
- Brookfield (town), Wisconsin
- Brookfield Place (New York City)
- Brookfield Township (disambiguation)

== Companies ==
- Brookfield Aviation
- Brookfield Corporation
  - Brookfield Properties
- Brookfield Engineering, a manufacturer of viscometers
- Brookfield Glass Company

== Other uses ==
- "Brookfield" (song), a song by Silverstein from the 2012 album Short Songs
- A British school in the 1934 James Hilton novella Good-bye, Mr. Chips
- A farm featured prominently in the British radio soap opera The Archers
- Brookfield (surname), list of people with the surname

== See also ==
- Brookfield Community School (disambiguation)
- Brookfield High School (disambiguation)
- Brookfield Place (disambiguation)
- Brookfield railway station (disambiguation)
