= Brookfield (surname) =

Brookfield is a surname. Notable people with the surname include:

- Arthur Brookfield (1870–1930), English footballer
- Arthur Montagu Brookfield (1853–1940), British army officer
- Charles Brookfield (1857–1913), British actor and playwright
- Edward Brookfield (1880–1965), British fencer
- Gaz Brookfield (born 1979), English folk and rock musician
- Harold Brookfield (1926–2022), British and Australian geographer
- Jane Octavia Brookfield (1821–1896), English literary hostess and writer
- John Brookfield (born 1955), British population geneticist
- Percy Brookfield (1875–1921), Australian politician and trade unionist
- Price Brookfield (1920–2006), American basketball and baseball player
- Ryan Brookfield (born 1987), English footballer
- Stephen Brookfield (born 1949), English-born scholar in adult education
- William Brookfield (politician) (1844–1903), American businessman and politician
- William Henry Brookfield (1809–1874), English priest

== See also ==
- Brookfield (disambiguation)
