= St John Hutchinson =

British barrister and Liberal Party politician

St John Hutchinson

St John Hutchinson KC (8 April 1884 – 24 October 1942) was a British barrister and Liberal Party politician.

== Background ==
Hutchinson was the only son of Charles Frederick Hutchinson and Ellen Soames of Scarborough. He was educated at Elstree School near Newbury, Berkshire, Winchester College in Hampshire and Magdalen College, Oxford where he received a Bachelor of Arts with History Honours in 1905. In 1910 he married Mary Barnes. They had one son, Jeremy and one daughter, Barbara Judith, who married Victor Rothschild, 3rd Baron Rothschild.

== Professional career ==
In 1909 Hutchinson became a Barrister-at-law, receiving a Call to the bar by the Middle Temple he joined the South-Eastern Circuit. In 1917 he was appointed Assistant Legal Adviser to the Ministry of Re-construction. In 1928 he became Recorder of Hythe, Kent. In 1930 he became Recorder of Hastings in Sussex, a post retained until his death. In 1931 he became Prosecuting Counsel to the Post Office at the Central Criminal Court. He held this post for four years. In 1935 he became a King's Counsel.

== Political career ==
Hutchinson's introduction to politics came through his father, who had been elected as Liberal MP for the Rye division of Sussex at the 1903 Rye by-election. His father lost the seat at the 1906 General Election. In November 1909, 2 years after his father's death, he succeeded him as Liberal prospective candidate for Rye and stood at the January 1910 General Election. He was well beaten by the incumbent Conservative;

General Election January 1910: Rye Electorate 13,746
Party	Candidate	Votes	%	±%
Conservative	George Loyd Courthope	7,352		
Liberal	St John Hutchinson	4,750		
Majority		2,602		
Turnout				
Conservative hold		Swing		

He was Liberal candidate again for Rye at the December 1910 General Election but again finished second;

General Election December 1910: Rye Electorate 13,746
Party	Candidate	Votes	%	±%
Conservative	George Loyd Courthope	6,673		
Liberal	St John Hutchinson	4,461		
Majority		2,212		
Turnout				
Conservative hold		Swing		

In 1912 he was elected to the London County Council in a by-election at Poplar, holding the seat for the Liberal party backed Progressives. He was re-elected, topping the poll in 1913, running in tandem with a Labour party candidate;

London County Council election, 1913: Poplar Electorate
Party	Candidate	Votes	%	±%
Progressive	✓ St John Hutchinson	3,061		
Labour	✓ Arabella Susan Lawrence	2,960		
Municipal Reform	T Vosper	1,599		
Municipal Reform	Mrs Elliott	1,492		
Majority		1,361		
Labour hold		Swing		
Majority		1,462		
Progressive hold		Swing		

In 1916 he stood down from the County Council. He was Liberal candidate for the Isle of Wight division at the 1929 General Election. This was a Unionist/Liberal marginal seat that the Unionists had won at the previous election in 1924 and the Liberals had last won in 1923. Although the Liberals were experiencing a mini-revival nationally, he could not translate that into a win on the Isle of Wight;

1929 United Kingdom general election: Isle of Wight Electorate 57,693
Party	Candidate	Votes	%	±%
Unionist	Peter Drummond Macdonald	21,949	48.2	−4.2
Liberal	St John Hutchinson	17,383	38.1	+0.3
Labour	H E Weaver	6,256	13.7	+3.9
Majority		4.566	10.1	−4.5
Turnout			79.0	
Unionist hold		Swing	-2.3	

He did not stand for parliament again. He continued to support the Liberal party. In 1939 on the Isle of Wight he spoke in support of the Liberal prospective candidate Helen Browne.

== Other interests ==
Hutchinson was a member of the Executive Committee of the Contemporary Art Society. Shortly before his death he was appointed a Trustee of the Tate Gallery.

== Jeremy Hutchinson ==
Although St John Hutchinson was unable to follow his father into parliament, his son Jeremy entered parliament in 1978. He was recommended by Liberal party leader, David Steel for a life peerage, and took the title of Baron Hutchinson of Lullington and a seat in the House of Lords where he sat as a Liberal and later a Liberal Democrat, until on 3 October 2011 he became one of the first two peers to retire from membership under a newly instituted procedure.
