= Arthur Montagu Brookfield =

British politician (1853–1940)

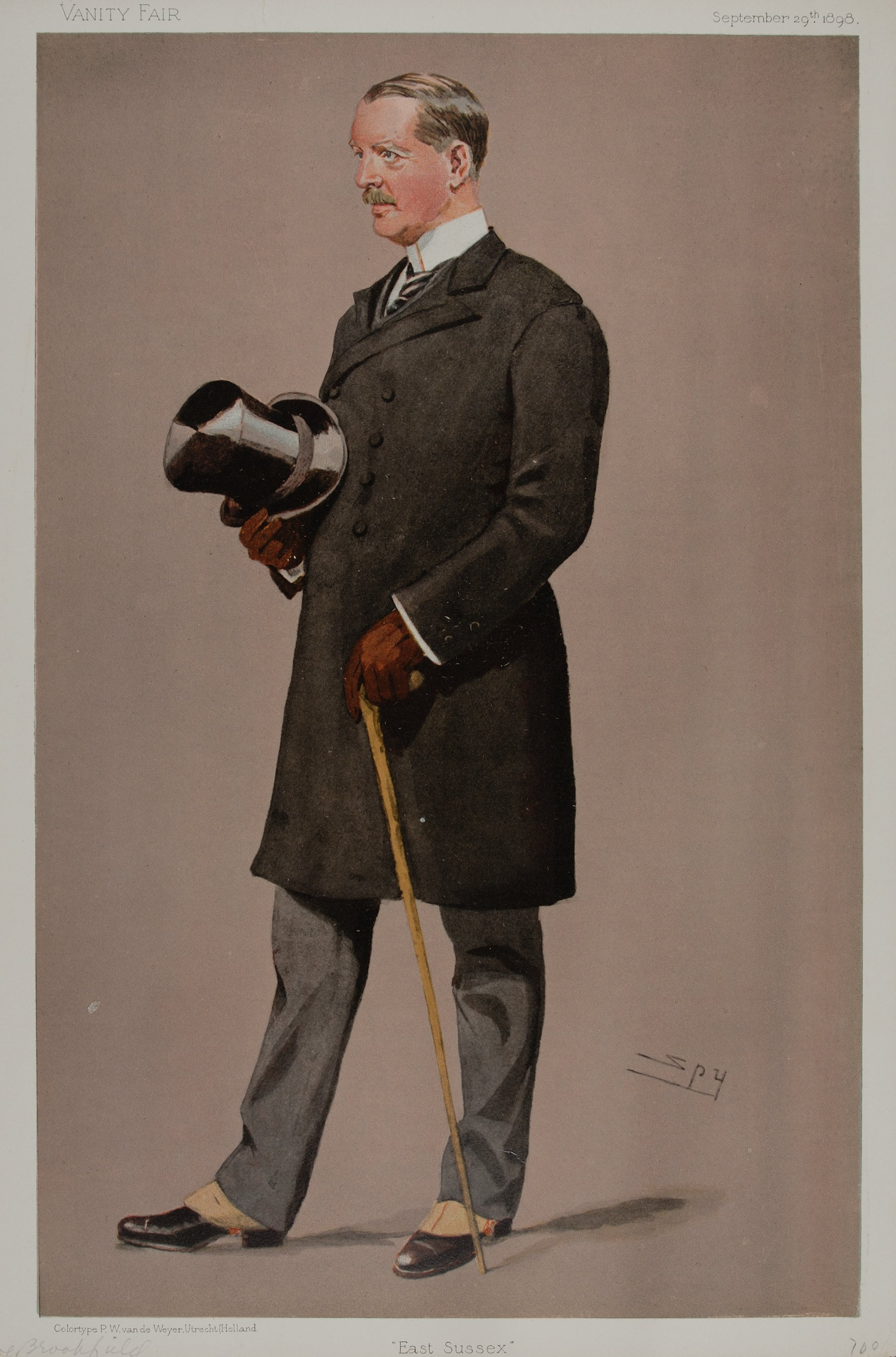
- "East Sussex"; Brookfield as caricatured by Spy (Leslie Ward) in Vanity Fair, September 1898

Member of Parliament for Rye
- In office 1885–1903

Personal details
- Born: 18 March 1853
- Died: 3 March 1940 (aged 86)
- Party: Conservative

Arthur Montagu Brookfield (18 March 1853 – 3 March 1940) was a British Army officer, diplomat, author and Conservative politician who sat in the House of Commons from 1885 to 1903.

== Biography ==
Brookfield was the son of Rev. William Henry Brookfield, curate of St. Luke's, Berwick Street, and Jane Octavia, daughter of Sir Charles Elton, 6th Baronet. He was educated at Rugby School and Jesus College, Cambridge. He served as a lieutenant in the 13th Hussars in India and retired from the regular army in 1880. He was Colonel commanding the 1st Cinque Ports Rifle Volunteers and was a JP for Sussex.

At the 1885 general election, Brookfield was elected Conservative Member of Parliament (MP) for Rye. In Parliament he was responsible for the Uniforms Act 1894. During his time in Parliament, he volunteered for active service in the Second Boer War, and was appointed to command a battalion of the Imperial Yeomanry, leaving Southampton for South Africa in early April 1900 on the SS Carisbrooke Castle. Brookfield left his parliamentary seat in 1903 to become British Consul at Montevideo, and in 1904 transferred as consul to Danzig, then in West Prussia. In 1910 he became British Consul at Savannah, Georgia, which was a shipping point for the cotton trade between the U.S. and Great Britain.

He was appointed a Knight of Grace of the Order of the Hospital of St. John of Jerusalem in England (KGStJ) in August 1901.

== Bibliography ==
Brookfield wrote five novels, a book of advice on giving speeches and an autobiographic sketch:

- The Bachelor (1879)
- Post Mortem: A Story (1881)
- The Autobiography of Thomas Allen V3 (1882)
- The Apparition (1884)
- Simiocracy (1884)
- The Speaker's ABC (1892)
- Annals of a chequered life (1930)

== Family ==
Brookfield married in 1877 Olive Harriet Hamilton, daughter of James Murray Hamilton of Preston, N.B. and of Buffalo, U.S.A. His brother Charles Brookfield was an actor playwright and journalist.

Parliament of the United Kingdom
Preceded by Frederick Andrew Inderwick	Member of Parliament for Rye; 1885 – 1903	Succeeded by Charles Frederick Hutchinson
