= Frederick Morris Preston Brookfield =

Early New Zealand lawyer and judge

- Born: 26 April 1825; Sheffield
- Died: 4 October 1906; Auckland
- Occupations: Judge, Solicitor

Frederick Morris Preston Brookfield (sometimes spelt Frederic) (26 April 1825 – 4 October 1906) was a judge at the Native Land Court of New Zealand and a prominent lawyer in early New Zealand. He was the younger brother of William Henry Brookfield, chaplain-in-ordinary to Queen Victoria, and brother in law to his wife the author Jane Octavia Brookfield.

== Biography ==
Brookfield was born in England in 1825 the third son of Charles Brookfield a notable Sheffield solicitor. He studied law under his eldest brother Charles Austin Brookfield in London, before going into practice there. In 1851 he emigrated to Auckland, New Zealand.

Brookfield's home in Onehunga (near the corner of Brookfield Ave and Onehunga Mall) was built in 1875 on the site of an earlier dwelling.

He had 4 sons and 4 daughters

== Career ==
Brookfield studied and practised law in London and Melbourne before being admitted to practise in New Zealand in 1855. He was a provincial solicitor for Auckland Province before becoming a Crown Prosecutor. In politics, he represented Onehunga 1861-63, then Pensioner Settlements 1870-73, as a member of the Provincial Council executive.

On 28 March 1879, he became the founding Vice President of the Auckland District Law Society, alongside Frederick Whitaker.

Brookfield retired as Native Land Court judge in January 1885 and founded a practice with his eldest son, Frederic William Brookfield. The practice was named Brookfield and Son and was located in the Colonial Bank Buildings on Queen St.

In 1889, father and son notably brought a case before the mayor of Onehunga Michael Yates for slander, after the mayor allegedly accused them of "trying to ruin the town".
