= Brookfield Township, Michigan =

Brookfield Township is the name of some places in the U.S. state of Michigan:

- Brookfield Township, Eaton County, Michigan
- Brookfield Township, Huron County, Michigan

== See also ==
- Brookfield Township (disambiguation)
