= William Henry Brookfield =

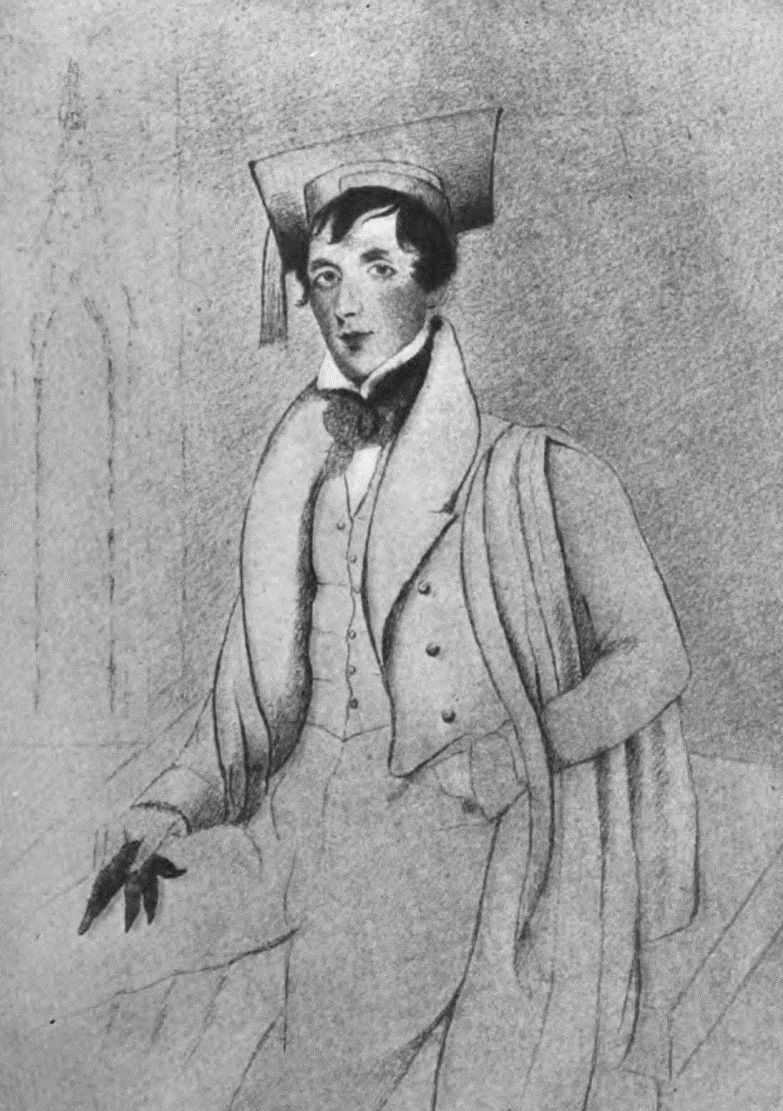
- William Henry Brookfield at the age of 23
- Born: 31 August 1809
- Died: 12 July 1874 (aged 64)
- Education: Trinity College, Cambridge
- Occupations: Anglican priest, solicitor
- Known for: Chaplain-in-ordinary to Queen Victoria
- Spouse: Jane Octavia
- Children: Arthur Montagu Brookfield, Charles Brookfield
- Parents: Charles Brookfield (father); Frances Brookfield (mother)
- Relatives: Charles Austin Brookfield (brother), Frederick Morris Preston Brookfield (brother)

William Henry Brookfield (31 August 1809 – 12 July 1874) was an Anglican priest, Inspector of Schools, and chaplain-in-ordinary to Queen Victoria. His son was the playwright Charles Brookfield.

== Biography ==
William Henry Brookfield was the second son of Charles Brookfield, a solicitor at Sheffield, where he was born on 31 August 1809.

He attended Leeds Grammar School, and in 1827 he was articled to a solicitor at Leeds, but left this position to enter Trinity College, Cambridge, in October 1829 (B.A. 1833, and M.A. 1836). In 1834 he became tutor to George William Lyttelton. In December 1834 he was ordained to the curacy of Maltby in Lincolnshire. He was afterwards curate at Southampton, in 1840 of St. James's, Piccadilly, and in 1841 of St. Luke's, Berwick Street.

In 1841 he married Jane Octavia, the eighth and youngest daughter of Sir Charles Elton of Clevedon Court, Somerset. Julia Maria, wife of Henry Hallam the historian was Sir Charles's sister. In 1848 Brookfield was appointed inspector of schools by Lord Lansdowne. He held the post for seventeen years, during part of which time he was morning preacher at Berkeley Chapel, Mayfair. On resigning his inspectorship he became rector of Somerby-cum-Humby, near Grantham. He was also reader at the Rolls Chapel, and continued to reside chiefly in London. In 1860 he was appointed honorary chaplain to the queen, and later chaplain-in-ordinary. He died on 12 July 1874. Mrs. Brookfield died on 27 November 1896 at Walpole Street, Chelsea. One son, Arthur Montagu Brookfield was an army officer, Member of Parliament, Diplomat and author. Another son, Charles Brookfield, was a well-known actor and playwright.

According to the Dictionary of National Biography, Brookfield was an impressive preacher and attracted many cultivated hearers. His sermons, which show no special theological bias, had considerable literary merit. He had an original vein of humour, which made even his reports as a school inspector unusually amusing. He had extraordinary powers of elocution and mimicry. As a reader he was unsurpassable, and his college friends describe his powers of amusing anecdote as astonishing. He had the melancholy temperament often associated with humour, and suffered from ill-health, which in 1851 necessitated a voyage to Madeira. He was known to all the most eminent men of letters of his time, some of whom, especially Lord Tennyson and Arthur Hallam, had been his college friends. He was described by his friend Thackeray as Frank Whitestock in the Curate's Walk, and Lord Tennyson contributes a sonnet to his memory in the Memoir. In the same memoir, written by his old pupil and friend Lord Lyttelton, will be found letters from Thomas Carlyle, Sir Henry Taylor, Alexander William Kinglake, James Spedding, and others.
