= Brookfield Community School =

Brookfield Community School may refer to:

- Brookfield Community School, Chesterfield
- Brookfield Community School, Fareham

== See also ==
- Brookfield (disambiguation)
