= Charles Frederick Hutchinson =

English physician and Liberal politician

Sir Charles Hutchinson MP

Member of Parliament for Rye
- In office 1903–1906
- Preceded by: Arthur Montagu Brookfield
- Succeeded by: George Courthope
- Majority: 4,910 (52.9%)

Personal details
- Born: Charles Frederick Hutchinson; 23 January 1850
- Died: 25 November 1907 (aged 57)
- Party: Liberal
- Education: Elstree School; Uppingham School; University of Edinburgh

Sir Charles Frederick Hutchinson (23 January 1850 – 15 November 1907) was an English physician and Liberal politician. He was the Member of Parliament (MP) for the Rye Division of Sussex from 1903 to 1906.

== Family and education ==
Charles Hutchinson was the son of Richard Scholes Hutchinson, a medical doctor from Nottingham and his wife Innes Hadden. In 1880 he married Ellen Soames of London. They had one son, St John Hutchinson who also became a Liberal politician, contesting his father's old seat for the Liberals at both the January and December 1910 general elections.

Hutchinson was educated at Elstree School, Uppingham and the University of Edinburgh where he got his MD. He also studied in Berlin, Vienna and Paris.

== Career ==
Hutchinson went in for medicine, having passed his primary examinations in anatomy and physiology in 1871. He practised mainly in Scarborough during the year but spent his winters in Monte Carlo. He retired from practice about 1902.

== Politics ==
After he retired, Hutchinson went to live in Mayfield in Sussex He contested the general election in the Liberal interest in the Rye or Eastern Division of Sussex. Rye could by this time be considered a safe Conservative seat. It had not returned a Liberal since the 1880 general election and its sitting MP, Arthur Montagu Brookfield had held the seat since 1885, having been returned unopposed at the previous general election in 1895.

=== Liberal Imperialism ===
Hutchinson was on that wing of the Liberal Party which called itself the Liberal Imperialists. They argued that the Liberals had lost the centre vote because the party had distanced itself from "the new Imperial spirit". Instead, they argued for a "clean slate" with the old, classical Liberalism giving way to the new ideas of "National Efficiency" and imperialism.

=== 1900 general election ===
Brookfield, who had been a professional soldier until his retirement in 1880, had been away in South Africa commanding a battalion of the Imperial Yeomanry in the Second Anglo-Boer War. He did not get back to England until 8 October 1900 by which time Hutchinson had been able to start campaigning. Polling took place in Rye on 12 October and despite Brookfield's absence, the general mood of support for the government at time of war (especially given Colonel Brookfield's own participation in the conflict) proved too great a hurdle for Hutchinson. At the last election which had been contested, that of 1892, Brookfield had a majority of 711 votes. This time he turned that into a majority of 2,489, taking 65.1% of the poll to Hutchinson's 34.9%.

=== 1903 by-election ===
Three years later however the political situation was transformed. The war was over, the government was unpopular and the 1902 Education Act was proving a disaster for the Tories and a rallying cause to Liberals, especially those in the nonconformist tradition. Brookfield resigned from the House of Commons to take up an appointment as HM Consul at Montevideo thus causing a by-election and Hutchinson was again called on by the local Liberal Association to be their candidate. In the changed political climate Hutchinson won a narrow victory at the election held on 17 March 1903, defeating the new Conservative candidate Edward Boyle, a barrister, by 534 votes.

=== 1906 ===
The 1906 general election was a Liberal landslide, exceeding the most optimistic Liberal hopes. Hutchinson however did not share in this political good fortune. The Unionist parties won few seats against the general trend but Rye was one of them, along with some other seats they had lost in by-elections since 1900. Hutchinson faced a new Conservative candidate, George Courthope another barrister but a Sussex man. Despite the pro-Liberal feeling in the country, Hutchinson saw his slim majority overtaken by Courthope who eventually won with a majority of 1,158 votes.

=== St John Hutchinson ===
After his death, his son St John Hutchinson contested Rye for the Liberal party at both the 1910 General elections, but without success.

== Honours and other appointments ==
Hutchinson received a knighthood in the King's Birthday Honours list of 1906. He was also appointed as a Justice of the Peace.

== Death ==
Hutchinson was taken ill in 1907 suffering from a throat affection and it was reported in July of that year that he was in a critical condition with little hope of recovery. He did rally in August but by the end of the month he had a relapse and by the end of September he had been removed from his house in Mayfield to a London nursing home. He died on 15 November 1907.

Parliament of the United Kingdom
| Preceded by Arthur Montagu Brookfield | Member of Parliament for Rye; 1903 – 1906 | Succeeded by George Courthope |
