= 1903 Rye by-election =

UK parliamentary by-election

- 17 March 1903

Candidate	Hutchinson	Boyle
Party	Liberal	Conservative
Popular vote	4,910	4,376
Percentage	52.9%	47.1%
MP before election
Arthur Brookfield
Conservative
Subsequent MP
George Courthope
Conservative

The 1903 Rye by-election was a by-election held in England on 17 March 1903 for the UK House of Commons constituency of the Rye or Eastern Division of Sussex.

== Vacancy ==
The by-election was caused by the resignation of the sitting Conservative Member of Parliament (MP) Arthur Montagu Brookfield. Brookfield had been MP for Rye since 1885 but he resigned in order to take up the post of HM Consul in Montevideo.

== Candidates ==
The Conservatives and Unionists selected 54-year-old Edward Boyle who was a barrister and King's Counsel, as their candidate. Boyle had unsuccessfully contested Hastings at the 1900 general election and had his country seat at Hurst Green in the then Rye constituency.

The Liberals chose Charles Frederick Hutchinson, a 53-year-old medical doctor who had retired to Sussex. Hutchinson had been their candidate against Arthur Brookfield at the 1900 general election.

== Campaign ==
The opposing candidates adopted classic by-election positions. Boyle defending the Conservative government record, Hutchinson attacking it. One newspaper reported Boyle making his chief appeal ‘on general grounds’. Rye was a largely rural seat and Boyle chose to focus on agricultural issues praising the Agricultural Rates Act 1896, which had led to the de-rating of farm land, as a step in the right direction and promising to keep up Brookfield's campaign to press legislative proposals for the defence of the hop industry. On the controversial issue of education, following the Education Act 1902, Boyle took the view that, while this was not a perfect piece of legislation, it was an honest attempt to deal with a difficult matter. Boyle also took a stand against Irish Home Rule stating he was ‘absolutely against a separate Parliament for Ireland’.

Hutchinson by contrast described the Education Act 1902 as a gross injustice to non-conformists and relied on appeals to religion elsewhere in his campaign calling for the maintenance of the Protestant character of the Church of England. In this he was supported by the receipt of a letter from the Reverend R. J. Campbell, of the City Temple and one of the country's leading non-conformist clergy. The letter urged voters to return Liberal candidates such as Hutchinson to Parliament with a view to a speedy reversal of the current education policy. This focus on religion may have served Hutchinson particularly well at this time as the Weald was said to be one of the few significant pockets of Nonconformity in the rural Home Counties.

As a Liberal, it was not surprising when Hutchinson came out in support of Irish Home Rule.

On foreign policy, Hutchinson declared himself against European complications and alliances. As a Liberal Imperialist he no doubt saw the future in the context of the British Empire. He supported the taxation of land values, licensing reform, the extension of smallholdings and one man one vote. At a conference held at Hastings by the Sussex Women's Liberal Association, he promised to support a bill for women's suffrage.

=== Election incidents ===
The election turned nasty at some points. A Conservative procession at Battle was attacked by stone and bottle throwers and torches were wrested from their bearers. It was reported that many people were injured. On the other side however a Liberal meeting at Rye was cut short owing to what was described as an onslaught by young Tories and one of Hutchinson's meetings at Burwash was similarly infiltrated and disrupted by Boyle's supporters.

Boyle also suffered a couple of setbacks when his motor cars broke down. It was reported that on Friday 13 March (perhaps inevitably on such a date) that he met with his second motor accident, being left stranded on a country road with the induction coil out of gear.

== Result ==
The result was a win for Hutchinson and the Liberal Party.

Hutchinson

Rye by-election, 1903
Party	Candidate	Votes	%	±%
Liberal	Charles Frederick Hutchinson	4,910	52.9	+18.0
Conservative	Edward Boyle	4,376	47.1	−18.0
Majority		534	5.8	N/A
Turnout		9,286	74.0	+4.3
Liberal gain from Conservative		Swing	+18.0	

Rye was a typical mid-term by-election result with public opinion turning against the party in office. It seems that Boyle had been right to try and focus on agricultural issues as one commentator has noted that the import duty on corn (which had been introduced as a Boer War revenue measure in the 1902 budget) was a factor in this and other by-election upsets of the day.

One decisive factor in Hutchinson's victory may however simply have been better organisation than that of the Unionists. It was reported a week before polling that the Conservative agents seemed complacent and were taking a laissez-faire approach to electioneering. It was noted that they had not held as many meetings as expected and could do with more outside assistance from agents who knew their jobs. It was also reported that the Liberals held 25 meetings across the constituency on the eve of poll, supported by a dozen Members of Parliament. This compared with the Tories holding between 12 and 20 eve of poll events, depending on which reports were most accurate, with about six MPs. If there was any sense of complacency in the Conservative camp this presumably flowed from the fact that Rye had long been one of their stronghold seats. However the Tory election agent at least had sensed the danger as he told supporters that a very determined effort was being made by what he called the Radical party to win the seat and he complained that he had had to deal with a mass of misrepresentation and false statements, accusing the Liberals of even circulating untrue statements about Mr Boyle's religious views.

What is clear is that the Liberals had never previously made such a sustained effort to capture the seat. Complaints were made that they had brought in a number of professional outside agents, paid by other local Liberal associations or by headquarters in Parliament Street, payments to whom were unlikely to be included in the official election expense returns. The press expected questions to be put to the Attorney General on the legality or otherwise of this practice.

== Aftermath ==
Hutchinson held the seat until 1906 when the Rye reverted to its more usual Conservative representation. After his defeat by George Courthope, Hutchinson did not stand for Parliament again.

Boyle was elected in 1906 as MP for Taunton, but held the seat for only 3 years, until his death in 1909 at the age of 60.
