= Brookfield railway station =

Brookfield railway station may refer to:

- Brookfield railway station (England), a closed station in Cumbria, England
- Brookfield station (Illinois), a station in the United States
- Brookfield station (Metro-North), a proposed station in Connecticut, USA
- Brookfield station (Wisconsin), a closed station in Wisconsin, USA
- Brookfield railway station (Nova Scotia), a closed station in Canada
- Brookfield railway station, Victoria, a closed station in Australia
