= Brookfield Engineering =

Subsidiary of Ametek

Brookfield Engineering is an engineering and manufacturing company with headquarters in Middleboro, Massachusetts. It is a subsidiary of the conglomerate Ametek. Its product line includes laboratory viscometers, rheometers, texture analyzers, and powder flow testers as well as in-line process instrumentation. These instruments are used by research, design, and process control departments.

== History ==
The company was established in 1934 by Don Brookfield Sr., who graduated from MIT with a degree in electrochemical engineering. Brookfield Engineering was a family-run business until 1986, when it became an ESOP company. It has been ISO certified since the 1990s.

Brookfield Engineering has dealers in 60 countries and regional offices in the US, UK, Germany, India and China. All manufacturing is located in the US at company headquarters.

== Operation ==
Classical Brookfield viscometers employ the principle of rotational viscometry—the torque required to turn an object, such as a spindle, in a fluid indicates the viscosity of the fluid. Torque is applied through a calibrated spring to a disk or bob spindle immersed in test fluid and the spring deflection measures the viscous drag of the fluid against the spindle. The amount of viscous drag is proportional to the amount of torque required to rotate the spindle, and thus to the viscosity of a Newtonian fluid. In the case of non-Newtonian fluids, Brookfield viscosities measured under the same conditions (model, spindle, speed, temperature, time of test, container, and any other sample preparation procedures that may affect the behavior of the fluid) can be compared. When developing a new test method, trial and error is often necessary in order to determine the proper spindle and speeds. Successful test methods will deliver a % torque reading between 10 and 100. The rheological behavior of the test fluid can be observed using the same spindle at different speeds, but because the geometry of the fluid around a rotating bob or disk spindle in a large container does not allow a single shear rate to be assigned, proper rheometry is not feasible using this setup.

Apart from its rotating bob viscometers, Brookfield now also produces defined-geometry rheometers which allow complete rheological analysis of fluids.

== See also ==
- ASTM International
- Bulk density
- Deutsches Institut für Normung
- Food Rheology
- Mouthfeel
- Rheology
- Brookfield Engineering Products
- Brookfield University
