= Charles Brookfield =

British actor, playwright and journalist (1857–1913)

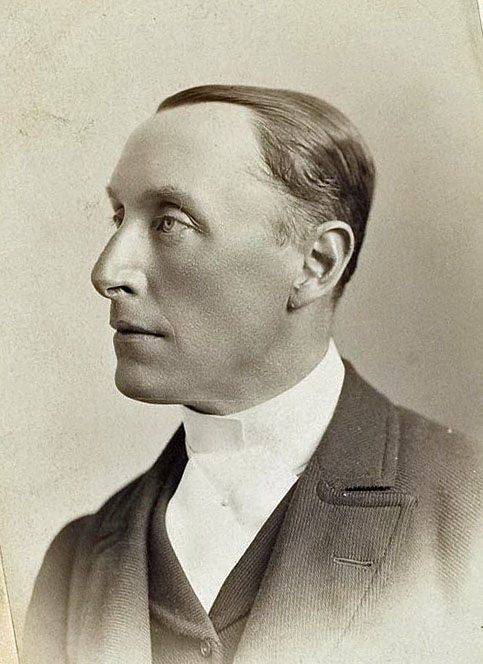
Charles Brookfield

Charles Hallam Elton Brookfield (19 May 1857 – 20 October 1913) was a British actor, playwright and journalist, including at The Saturday Review. His most famous work for the theatre was the Edwardian Musical Comedy The Belle of Mayfair (1906).

Brookfield had an early interest in theatre and joined the acting profession despite family opposition. He achieved success in a 20-year acting career, including with the company of Squire Bancroft at London's Haymarket Theatre in the 1880s. In 1893, he was the first actor known to have played Sherlock Holmes, in his own musical parody. During his acting career, Brookfield began writing stage works, and, in one of his last acting roles as Baron Grog in The Grand Duchess of Gerolstein in 1897 with the D'Oyly Carte Opera Company at the Savoy Theatre, he adapted the company's English version.

After he was diagnosed with tuberculosis in 1898, he focused on writing plays and musical theatre. In his last years, he was Britain's Examiner of Plays, even though he had been criticised as biased against various contemporary playwrights and also for writing a particularly risqué comedy in 1908.

== Early life and career ==
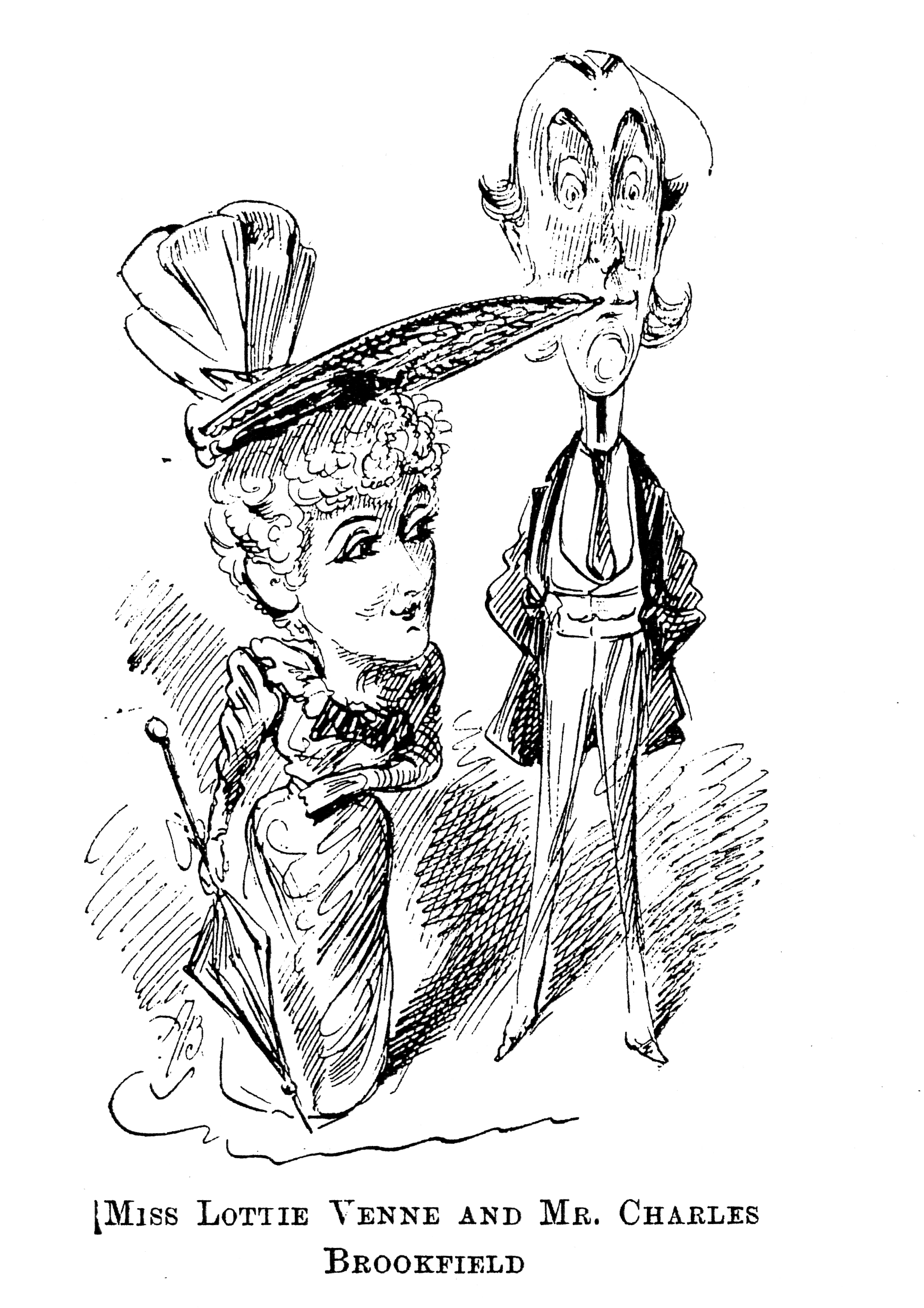
Brookfield and Lottie Venne

Brookfield was born in London, the third child of Rev. William Henry Brookfield, curate of St. Luke's, Berwick Street and his wife, Jane Octavia Brookfield (née Elton), novelist, daughter of Sir Charles Elton, 6th Baronet and niece of Henry Hallam. Brookfield was named after his paternal grandfather, a solicitor. His mother was a close friend of Thackeray and other literary figures, and his father was a devotee of the theatre, and young Brookfield grew up used to the company of artists and celebrities. With his brother Arthur, he created "dramatic diversions" at home. He was educated at Westminster School, from 1871 to 1873, and over the next two years attended lectures at King's College London, while also studying French theatre and becoming a reviewer of novels for The Examiner and a member of the Savile Club at the early age of seventeen. He then entered Trinity College, Cambridge (1875–78), participating in the productions of the Amateur Dramatic Club. There he earned the Winchester Reading Prize in 1878. After this, he tried studying law but disliked it.

Despite opposition from his family, Brookfield decided to try acting and made his professional stage debut in 1879 in a revival of Tom Taylor's Still Waters Run Deep at the Alexandra Palace Theatre. In his first year, he appeared mostly on tour. In 1880, after a severe bout of ill health, Brookfield joined the company of Squire Bancroft at London's Haymarket Theatre, earning complimentary reviews for his performances in supporting roles. In 1884 he married actress and author Frances Mary Grogan (1857–1926), who used the stage name Ruth Francis. The couple had one child, Peter, born in 1888. Brookfield became known for witty repartee and was popular at clubs and social gatherings. His acting career ranged from pantomime and farce to Shakespeare. He acted in plays together with such stars of the day as Ellen Terry, Herbert Beerbohm Tree and the Kendals.

Early in his acting career, Brookfield began to write plays, including adaptations of French plays. His Poet and Puppets, a travesty of Oscar Wilde's Lady Windermere's Fan, with music by Jimmy Glover, was well received at the Comedy Theatre in 1892, starring Charles Hawtrey and Lottie Venne. He also wrote To-day in 1892 and The Twilight of Love in 1893. In November 1893, he became the first actor known to portray Sherlock Holmes on stage, appearing at the Royal Court Theatre in Under the Clock, a musical parody of Holmes and Watson written with Seymour Hicks, who played Watson. Lottie Venne played Hannah, a maid of all-work. The piece angered Arthur Conan Doyle. Brookfield's play, A Woman's Reason, which ran at the Shaftesbury Theatre in 1895, was the first of his plays to appear on Broadway, in 1896. One of his last acting roles was in The Grand Duchess of Gerolstein, as Baron Grog, with the D'Oyly Carte Opera Company at the Savoy Theatre in 1897. He prepared the English adaptation of this piece, in which he bowdlerised the more risqué French version.

== Later years ==
Playbill for The Belle of Mayfair, starring Edna May

In 1898, after nearly two decades on stage, Brookfield gave up acting when, after a severe illness, he was diagnosed with advanced tuberculosis. He then focused, despite continued bouts of ill health and periods of convalescence in Europe, on journalism and writing farcical plays and musical theatre works. In 1900, he became a Roman Catholic and later visited Downside Abbey, in Somerset, where his son became a pupil in 1901. His stage works, in addition to those mentioned above, include the farce The Cuckoo, which premiered at the Avenue Theatre in London (1899), also playing on Broadway the same year at Wallack's Theatre; a comic opera, The Lucky Star (1899), written in conjunction with Adrian Ross and Aubrey Hopwood for the D'Oyly Carte; a play called I Pagliacci, based on the opera, at the Savoy Theatre (1904); the comic play What Pamela Wanted at the Criterion Theatre (1905); and another comedy, The Lady Burglar at Terry's Theatre (1906).

Brookfield's most successful work was the long-running Edwardian Musical Comedy, The Belle of Mayfair (1906), together with Basil Hood and Cosmo Hamilton, with music by Leslie Stuart, which also ran on Broadway beginning the same year. Another musical, the same year, was See-See, with lyrics by Ross and music by Sidney Jones, at the Prince of Wales Theatre. His play I Pagliacci ran on Broadway in 1908. Brookfield's work as a journalist included several years on the staff of The Saturday Review. In 1902, Edward Arnold published Brookfield's volume of Random Reminiscences. He and his wife together wrote Mrs Brookfield and her Circle (1905).

One of his later works, Dear Old Charley, another French adaptation, was produced at the Vaudeville Theatre in 1908 starring Charles Hawtrey. Though the critics admitted that the play was funny, it "caused a storm of controversy and became a synonym for the extremest stage naughtiness" and was criticised as unsuitable for the stage. It therefore amazed the public, and amused The New York Times, that Brookfield became the Examiner of Plays in the Lord Chamberlain's office in 1911. He also was attacked in the press as hostile to the "New Drama", such as Ibsen and Shaw, and also to Oscar Wilde, helping to gather evidence against Wilde in his trial of 1895. Brookfield, however, ignored public criticism and performed his duties, although his health continued to fail.

Brookfield succumbed to tuberculosis in 1913 at his home in London, aged 56. He is buried at Stratton on the Fosse, Somerset, in the Catholic Church.
