= Brookfield Place =

Brookfield Place may refer to:

- Brookfield Place (Calgary), skyscraper in Calgary, Alberta, Canada
- Brookfield Place (New York City), complex of office buildings in New York City, New York
- Brookfield Place (Perth), office tower in Perth, Western Australia
- Brookfield Place (Toronto), office tower in Toronto, Ontario, Canada
