= John Brookfield =

British population geneticist

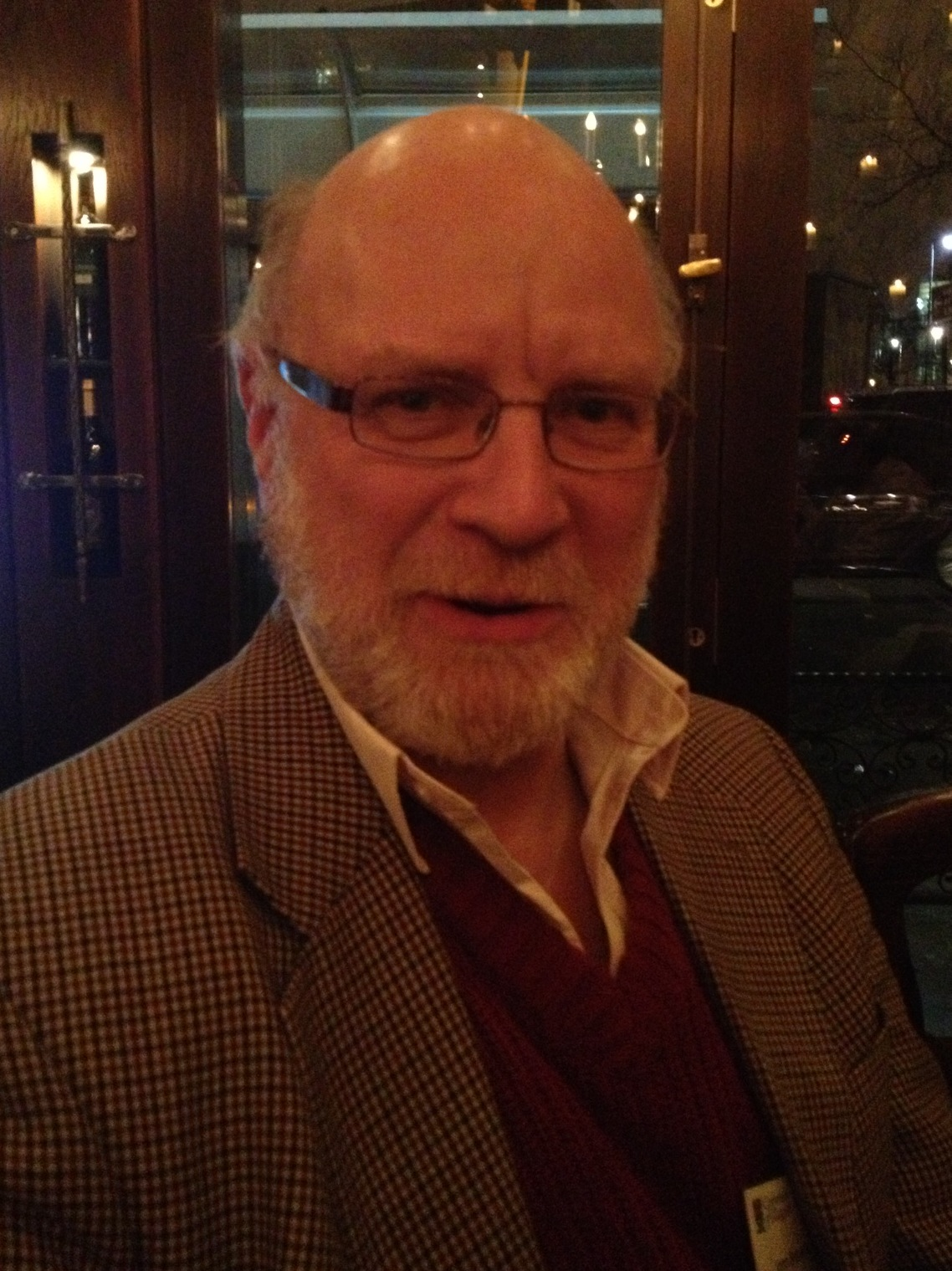
- John Brookfield (2012)
- Born: 30 May 1955 (age 71); Liverpool, United Kingdom
- Education: University of Oxford; University of London
- Scientific career
- Fields: Population Genetics
- Institutions: University of Nottingham; University of Leicester
- Thesis: (1980)
- Website: www.nottingham.ac.uk/biology/people/john.brookfield

John Brookfield (born 30 May 1955) is a British population geneticist. He is Professor of Evolutionary Genetics at the University of Nottingham, in the School of Biology.

== Research summary ==
Brookfield is interested in how the genome evolves and has recently focussed on the evolution of DNA sequences which control development, particularly in Drosophila, and on the evolution of transposable elements.

== Education, appointments and honours ==
Brookfield received his BA in Zoology from the University of Oxford 1976. He received his Ph.D. in Population Genetics at the University of London in 1980. Following a post as Research Demonstrator in Genetics at the University College of Swansea from 1979 to 1981, he became a visiting fellow in the Laboratory of Genetics at The National Institute of Environmental Health Sciences, North Carolina from 1981 to 1983. Returning to the UK, he became a lecturer in genetics at the University of Leicester from 1983 to 1986. He is now Professor of evolutionary genetics at the University of Nottingham.

Brookfield is an invited Fellow of the Society of Biology was appointed Fellow of the Institute of Biology in 2009, and has served as vice-president (External Relations) of the Genetics Society. He served on the UK RAE panel for the assessment of Biological Sciences in both 2001 and 2008.

== Popular Science ==
In 2006, Brookfield was invited to comment on the Chicken or the egg controversy, along with a number of others. All parties came down on the egg first side of the debate. Brookfield gives his reasoning as "The first chicken must have differed from its parents by some genetic change, perhaps a very subtle one, but one which caused this bird to be the first ever to fulfil our criteria for truly being a chicken. Thus the living organism inside the eggshell would have had the same DNA as the chicken that it would develop into, and thus would itself be a member of the species of chicken."

To further public understanding of evolutionary genetics, Brookfield has created a podcast explaining some of the issues, and as part of the Nottingham University 200 years of Darwin Celebrations, delivered Darwin's famous lecture On the Origin of the Species, in full Victorian dress. He has additionally written in the media about DNA profiling.

== Bibliography ==
Carr, M., Soloway, J.R., Robinson, T.E., and Brookfield, J.F.Y. (2001) An investigation of the cause of low variability on the fourth chromosome of Drosophila melanogaster. Molecular Biology and Evolution 18, 2260–2269.

Brookfield, J.F.Y. (2001) Genome evolution. Pp. 351–372 in: Handbook of Statistical Genetics. Eds. M. Bishop, D. Balding & C. Cannings John Wiley Chichester.

Johnson, L.J. and Brookfield, J.F.Y. (2002) Evolutionary dynamics of a selfishly spreading gene that stimulates sexual reproduction in a partially sexual population. J. Evolutionary Biology 15, 42–48.

Carr, M., Soloway, J.R., Robinson, T.E. and Brookfield, J.F.Y. (2002) Mechanisms regulating the copy numbers of six LTR retrotransposons in the genome of Drosophila melanogaster. Chromosoma 110, 511–518.

Edwards, R.J., Sockett, R.E., and Brookfield, J.F.Y. (2002) A simple method for genome-wide screening for advantageous insertions of mobile DNAs in Escherichia coli. Current Biology 12, 863–867.

Edwards, R. J. and Brookfield, J.F.Y. (2003) Transiently beneficial insertions could maintain mobile DNA sequences in variable environments. Molecular Biology and Evolution 20, 30–37.

Johnson, L.J. and Brookfield, J.F.Y. (2003) Evolution of spatial expression pattern. Evolution and Development 5, 593–599.

Phinchongsakuldit, J., MacArthur, S., and Brookfield, J.F.Y. (2004) Evolution of developmental genes: Molecular microevolution of enhancer sequences at the Ubx locus in Drosophila and its impact on developmental phenotypes. Molecular Biology and Evolution 21, 348–363.
