= Brookfield High School =

Brookfield High School may refer to:

== Canada ==
- Brookfield High School (Ottawa), Ontario, Canada

== United States ==
Alphabetical by state

- Brookfield High School (Connecticut)
- Riverside Brookfield High School, Illinois
- North Brookfield High School, Massachusetts
- Brookfield High School (Brookfield, Missouri), Brookfield, Missouri
- Brookfield Area Career Center, Brookfield, Missouri
- Brookfield Academy (New Jersey), Cherry Hill, New Jersey
- Brookfield High School (Ohio)
- Brookfield Academy, Wisconsin
- Brookfield Central High School, Wisconsin
- Brookfield East High School, Wisconsin
