= Brookfield Aviation =

Aviation services company in the UK

Brookfield Aviation International
- Type: Private
- Industry: Aviation services
- Founded: 1993
- Founders: David George, Bernie Duffield
- Headquarters: Epsom, United Kingdom,
- Key people: David George (Chief Executive Officer)
- Services: Pilot recruitment, Engineer recruitment, Aircraft leasing, Aviation management, Aviation finance, Training programs
- Number of employees: 25
- Subsidiaries: Brookfield Aviation International (Far East) Ltd.; Brookfield Aviation International (Europe) Ltd.; Brookfield Education and Training Ltd; Brookfield Aviation Finance Ltd.
- Website: brookfieldav.com

Brookfield Aviation International is the trading name of a UK-based aviation services group of companies that provides specialised services in pilot and engineer recruitment, aircraft leasing, and aviation management and finance. The original company was established in 1993, and since then has supplied over 7,000 pilots, engineers and aviation related personnel to more than 250 airlines and aviation companies around the world. These clients have included British Airways, Bombardier Aerospace, DHL, Air China, Avianca, China Eastern, Turkish Airlines, Royal Jordanian, Air Asia, China Eastern, Lufthansa Technik, South African Airways and Ryanair. Its headquarters is in Epsom, U.K., with representative offices in Colombia, Vietnam, India, Poland and Spain. Companies in the group include Brookfield Aviation Finance Ltd., Brookfield Aviation International (Far East) Ltd., Brookfield Aviation International (Europe) Ltd. and Brookfield Education and Training Ltd., each serving diverse market sectors. Brookfield Aviation International Ltd. received global attention in the 2010s when it was one of the agencies being investigated by German authorities for facilitating tax evasion through its crew hiring arrangements for Ryanair, however none of the allegations against Brookfield were ever substantiated. In recent years, the Brookfield group has been providing services such as pilot and engineer training and aviation business sales, in addition to its principal business in the provision of pilots and engineers on all commercial airline types.

== History ==
Brookfield Aviation was founded in London in 1993 by David George and Bernie Duffield. Its original office in Buckingham Street WC2 was on the site of the home of the famous diarist, Samuel Pepys. Brookfield’s first client was Fokker Aircraft company in the Netherlands, which had for decades been a leading manufacturer of regional aircraft. In 1994, Brookfield relocated from London to Epsom. By 1995, Brookfield Aviation had expanded its client base to include airlines in India, Europe, Africa and South America. The company subsequently provided crews for the introduction of Airbus 310s into the fleet of Aerolineas Argentinas, Boeing 727 and Lockheed Hercules crews for Safair’s European operations, Avro RJ and Embraer 145 for Crossair, and a multitude of seasonal pilots every year for charter companies including Pegasus, Nouvelair, Air U.K. Leisure, Excalibur Airways and Onur Air. It supplied expatriate pilots to the (at the time) new private airlines in India – Jet Airways, Modiluft, Air Sahara, East-West, Archana and Air Deccan. During 1999–2000, the company hired over 40 JAT pilots for Ryanair in response to the war in Yugoslavia.

The attack on New York on 11th September 2001 was followed by a significant downturn in the aviation industry as millions of passengers, especially in the western world, were unwilling to fly. Hence, in the aftermath of 9/11, between 2001 and 2003, Brookfield Aviation looked for new clients in other markets, acquiring new clients in Russia, Ukraine, and Moldova. In 2002, George and Duffield established Brookfield Railsearch, in response to an acute shortage of train drivers and signed contracts with numerous railway companies in U.K. and Europe.

By 2003, the aviation business had recovered, and Brookfield recruited hundreds more pilots from Europe, the USA, and Brazil. In July 2005, the company moved to its current headquarters at 122a High Street, Epsom. During the 2000s, Brookfield was one of the recruiting agencies that hired pilots on behalf of Ryanair. According to The New York Times, pilots were instructed to declare themselves as self-employed; Pilots were contracted to Brookfield through limited companies to provide piloting services to Ryanair, with Brookfield accounting for as much as half of Ryanair's flight deck crew corps. German authorities investigated Brookfield Aviation International Ltd. for tax evasion and raided Ryanair's German locations, however no such offence was ever proven. Furthermore, in May 2023, a court case brought by Brookfield against the German Pension Authority relating to social contributions was judged in favour of Brookfield.

In 2007, the company conducted its first business tour of China, establishing relationships with airlines such as Hainan Airlines, Air China, Shanghai Airlines, and China Eastern, and opened an office in Beijing. These relationships continued for many years, terminating only due to the Covid pandemic which had first affected China. From 2009 to 2015, Brookfield Aviation established the Brookfield Aviation Foundation, raising over £250,000 for charitable causes. In 2010, Brookfield Aviation, in collaboration with Nouvelair Tunisie, established Safe Flight Academy in Tunisia. This is now known as The Aviator Institute (TAI), in partnership with Airbus Flight Academy to deliver the Airbus ab initio pilot training programme in Tunisia.

Between 2012 and 2013, Brookfield expanded its reach in the Asia Pacific region, acquiring new clients from national airlines in Cambodia, Indonesia, Malaysia, Vietnam, Laos, and Myanmar. By this time, more than 2,500 pilots and engineers were operating under Brookfield contracts. In June 2015, co-founder Bernie Duffield died, and David George became the sole director of Brookfield Aviation and began building a new management team. In 2016, four new Brookfield companies were incorporated, including Brookfield Leasing, A.M.E., Far East, and Education. In February 2016, the first edition of Brookfield Aviation News was published, and in 2017, the inaugural "British Aviation Experience" event took place. This is a residential course in the U.K. for 14-18 year olds looking to take their first steps in an aviation career. Students have attended from the USA, Argentina, Hong Kong, India, South Africa and all over Europe.

From 2016 to 2025, Brookfield continued to expand its teams in Colombia, Vietnam, India, and other countries. New clients during this period included British Airways, DHL, Avianca, Bombardier, Royal Jordanian, Lufthansa Technik, Turkish Airlines, and numerous airlines in the USA.

The COVID-19 pandemic in 2020–2021 led to widespread contract cancellations and suspensions, with most employees working remotely during that period. However, the recovery of the industry post-Covid was rapid, and Brookfield continued to expand. In 2023, Brookfield Leasing transitioned into Brookfield Aviation Finance, with new projects in aviation business sales, mergers and acquisitions, and aviation investment. Future programmes include supporting the expanding UAS market by recruiting certified drone pilots and operators for inspection, survey, cargo, and security operations, alongside Brookfield’s core business.

== Services ==
Brookfield Aviation International offers a wide range of services. Among these services are: pilot recruitment across all commercial aircraft types–Brookfield delivers qualified captains and first officers for short-term and long-term assignments worldwide, engineer recruitment–Brookfield recruits licensed engineers and maintenance specialists for all major aircraft platforms, aviation management staffing–Brookfield conducts executive search for leadership positions such as CEO, COO, CFO, VP level, Chief Pilot, Director of Flight Operations, Safety Manager, Head of Training, and senior MRO executives, as well as recruiting flight operations personnel, dispatchers, ground operations teams, crew controllers, safety and compliance specialists, and technical operations staff, aircraft leasing, pilot and engineer training, and aviation sector business financing, Brookfield also operates "The British Aviation Experience", a professional aviation program tailored for 14-18-year-olds.
