= Charles Abraham Elton =

English officer in the British Army and author

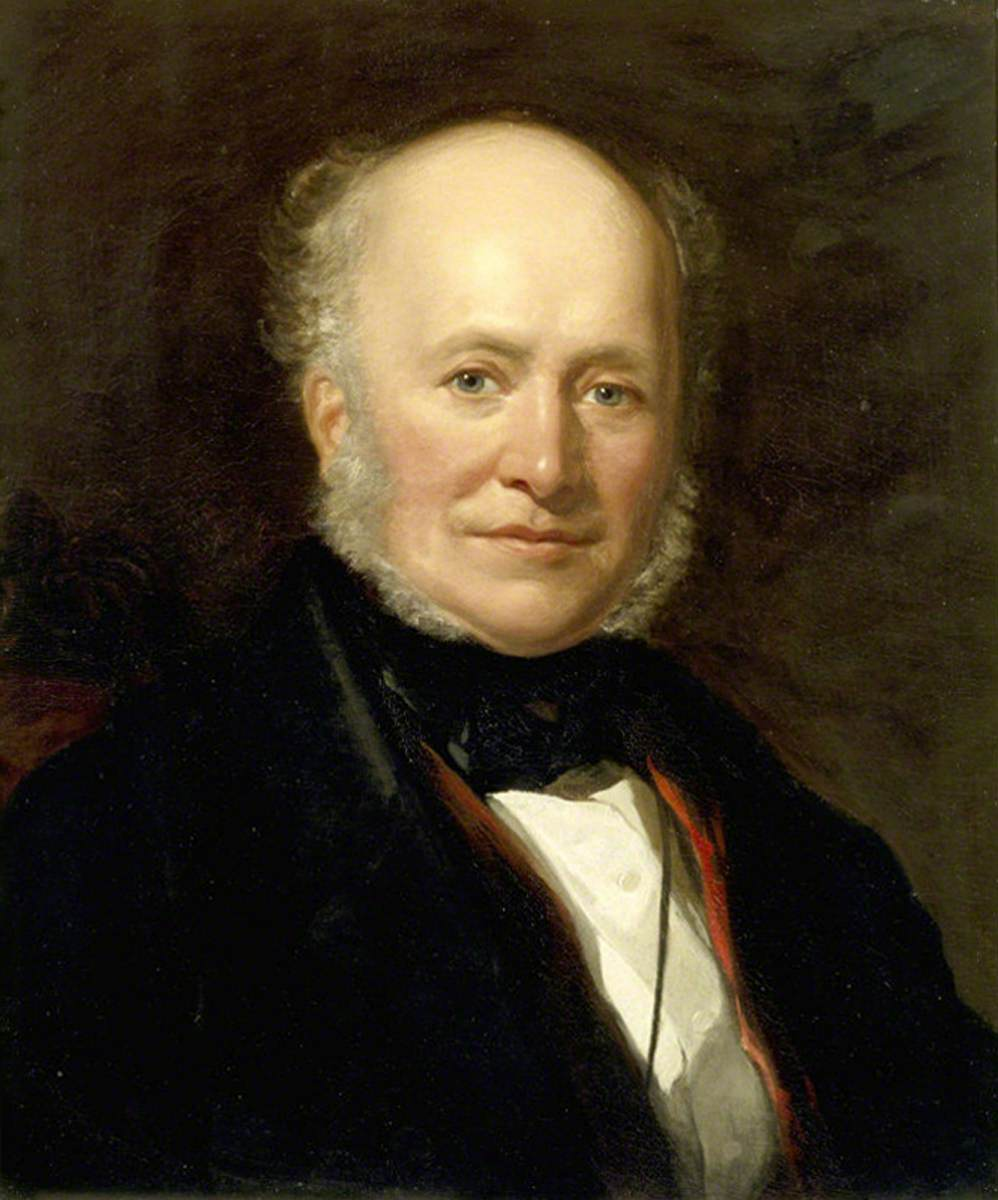

6th Baronet
- In office 1842–1853

Personal details
- Born: 31 October 1778 Bristol
- Died: 1 June 1853 (aged 74) Bath
- Spouse: Sarah Smith

Military service
- Rank: Lieutenant-colonel
- Unit: 48th Regiment of Foot; 4th Regiment of Foot; Somersetshire Militia
- Battles/wars: Flanders Campaign

Sir Charles Abraham Elton, 6th Baronet (31 October 1778 – 1 June 1853) was an English officer in the British Army and an author.

== Life ==
Charles was eldest of three sons of the Rev Sir Abraham Elton, 5th of the Elton baronets, by Elizabeth, daughter of Sir John Durbin, alderman of Bristol, and was born at Bristol on 31 October 1778. He was educated at Eton, and at the age of fifteen received a commission in the 48th Regiment of Foot, in which he rose to the rank of captain. He served with the 4th Regiment of Foot in the Flanders Campaign under Frederick, Duke of York. He was afterwards lieutenant-colonel of the Somersetshire Militia. On the death of his father (23 February 1842) he became 6th baronet.

Elton was friends with Charles Lamb and Samuel Taylor Coleridge. He was a strong Whig, and spoke at the Westminster hustings on behalf of Samuel Romilly and John Hobhouse; but latterly he lived much in retirement at his house, Clevedon Court. He died at Bath on 1 June 1853.

== Bibliography ==
Elton's published works were:

1. Poems, 1804.
2. Remains of Hesiod, translated into English verse.
3. Tales of Romance, and other Poems, including selections from Propertius, 1810.
4. Specimens of the Classical Poets in a chronological series from Homer to Tryphiodorus, translated into English verse, 1814 (with critical observations prefixed to each specimen; reviewed in the Quarterly Review, xiii. 151–8).
5. Remains of Hesiod, translated... with notes, 1815 (by C. A. E.)
6. Appeal to Scripture and Tradition in Defence of the Unitarian Faith (anon.), 1818.
7. The Brothers, a Monody [referring to the death of his sons], and other Poems, 1820.
8. History of Roman Emperors, 1825.
9. Δεύτερας Φροντιδες: Second Thoughts on the Person of Christ, on Human Sin, and on the Atonement, containing reasons for the Author's Secession from the Unitarian Communion and his Adherence to that of the Established Church, 1827.

== Family ==
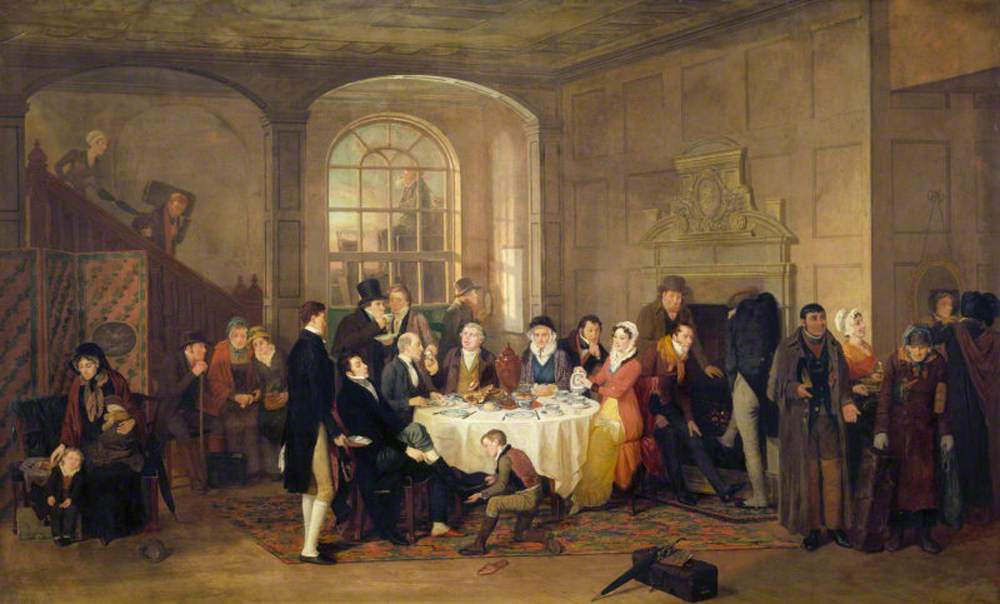
The Stage Coach Breakfast by Edward Villiers Rippingille, 1824. It depicts Elton and his family with many of the leading writers of the era including Wordsworth, Southey and Coleridge.

Elton married in 1804 Sarah, eldest daughter of Joseph Smith, merchant of Bristol, by whom he had five sons and eight daughters.

The two eldest sons were drowned in 1819, while bathing near Birnbeck Island, Weston-super-Mare. The third, Arthur Hallam Elton (born 19 April 1818), succeeded to the baronetcy, and died 14 October 1883. The fifth son, Rev. Henry George Tierney Elton, was Vicar of West Hatch, Somerset, and married Georgina Flora Willis, dying in 1905 having had issue.

Elton's fourth daughter, Laura Mary (died 1848) married Charles Samuel Grey (1811–16), Paymaster of the Civil Services in Ireland and second son of Sir George Grey, 1st Baronet Grey of Fallodon, with whom she had five children. His seventh daughter, Mary Elizabeth, was mother of Charles Isaac Elton (an M.P. and author of Origins of English History). The eighth daughter, Jane Octavia, married William Henry Brookfield.

Elton's sister, Julia Maria, married Henry Hallam the historian.

== See also ==
- Elton baronets
- Clevedon Court

== Notes ==
Baronetage of Great Britain
Preceded by Abraham Elton	Baronet (of Bristol); 1842–1853	Succeeded by Arthur Elton
