= List of New Zealand Rover Moots =

New Zealand Rover Moots
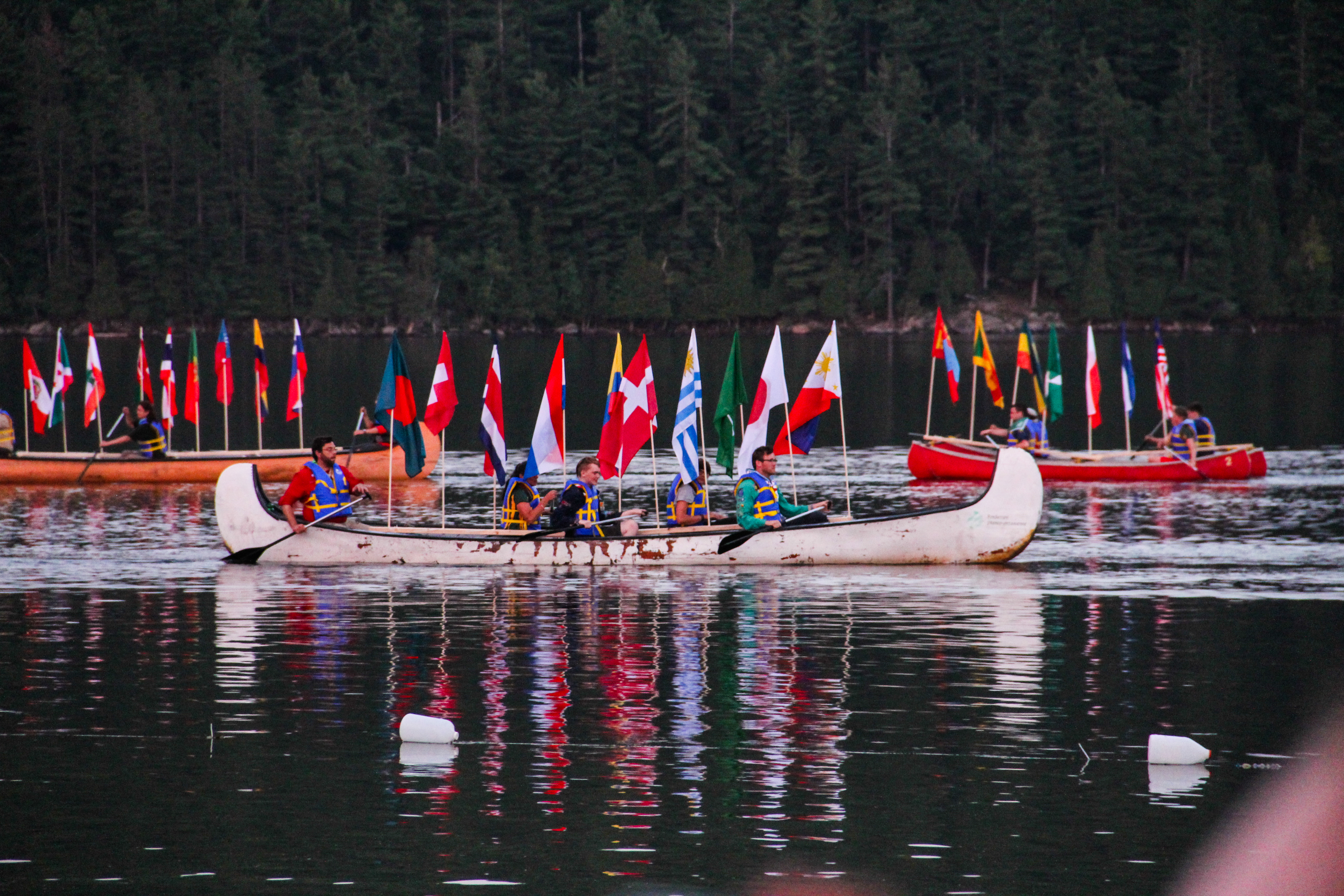
- Scout Moot 2013

There have been 82 National Rover Moots in New Zealand. The first was the Dominion Rover Scout Moot at New Brighton Racecourse, Christchurch in 1936 although there was a North island Moot in 1935.

The Moot is held annually over Easter. The event entails three days of scheduled activities which include a community service project, sporting competitions, and a selection of day tours. A number of awards recognising Rover Crews and individuals for the service and programme they have run over the preceding year are awarded as part of the Moot.

The 2020 Moot was originally scheduled to be Déjà Vu Moot however, due to the COVID-19 pandemic, the event had to be postponed, and the Moot was instead held online. In 2022 the Moot was postponed due to the COVID-19 pandemic and concerns about organising and running the event while New Zealand was in the Red Light setting of the COVID-19 Protection Framework.

In 2020 the Regal Rover Crew held the NZ RETIRE MOOT. However since this was a local event, it is not included in this list of national events.

== Awards ==
The following trophies are presented annually at moot:

Zulu Shield - Presented to the Crew with the most complete Log Book, which recognizes that the Crew has maintained a balanced programme based on the aims of the Rover Programme.

Baden Powell Lodge No. 381 Service Shield - Presented to the Crew with the most extensive service over the previous year. Originally presented to Auckland Crews by the Baden Powell Freemasons Lodge. Awarded on a national level after the lodge moved from Auckland to Wellington.

Helen Thomas Memorial Trophy - Awarded to a Rover, nominated by their Crew, as having shown outstanding commitment to service within Scouting and the community, setting an example to those around them, and who lives by the Scout Law. The nominee may be a member who has not been in Rovers for more than two years. Helen died tragically in a rafting accident while attending the 48th National Rover Moot in Timaru.

=== Moot Spirit Awards ===
Fergus McLaren Banner - Initially awarded for camping standards at the Moot, but now awarded to the Rover Crew who best participates and shows good Rover spirit during the weekend and is considered the premier award for this section of Scouting. The banner that is currently presented has been in use from 2014 and is the fourth banner. The previous banners commenced use in 1944, 1976 and 1986. The banner is named after 2nd Lt. Fergus McLaren, a Dunedin Rover Scout, who was killed in Greece during the Second World War.

Eastman Shield (Fastest Rover at the Moot) - Awarded to the individual Rover who contributes the most to the Moot spirit. Named for the Eastman Rover Crew from Palmerston North.

Nymph Trophy - Awarded to the crew whose female members contribute most to the success of the Moot.

Macho Trophy - Awarded to the crew whose male members contribute most to the success of the Moot.

=== Sporting Trophies ===
Shooting Trophy - Awarded to the crew who scores the highest in the Shooting Trophy competition. Traditionally the competition is a round robin of activities requiring some form of marksmanship skills.

Top Hat & Bowler - Awarded to the winners of the Tug of War competition. There are awards for the winners of the men's, women's, and mixed team competitions. The tug of war is competed as a four person variant of tug of war traditionally played in New Zealand.

Cross Country - Awarded to the first placing individual male and female, and first placed male and female teams in the cross country competition, based on the average placement of the runners.

== Previous Moots ==
List based on the New Zealand Badgers Club "The Histories Book: A History of New Zealand Scout District Badges" 4th Edition 2014 (preprint edition)

Year	Name	Location	Organising Team	Badge/Logo
1935	North Island Rover Moot	Chateau Tongariro		
1936	1st Dominion Rover Moot	New Brighton Racecourse, Christchurch		
1937	2nd Dominion Rover Moot	Racecourse Hill, Lansdowne, Masterton		
1938	3rd Dominion Rover Moot	Timaru		
1939	4th Dominion Rover Moot	Heretaunga, Upper Hutt		
1940	5th Dominion Rover Moot	Christchurch		
1941	Memorial Rover Scout Moot	Taita Upper Hutt		
1944	6th Dominion Rover Moot	Rangiora, Canterbury		
Date?	7th Dominion Rover Moot	Lower Hutt		
Date?	8th Dominion Rover Moot	Dunedin		
Date?	9th Dominion Rover Moot	Rotorua		
1951	10th Dominion Rover Moot	Tatum Park Hutt		
1952	11th Dominion Rover Moot	Cracroft House, Cashmere, Christchurch		
1953	12th Dominion Rover Moot	The Narrows, Ngaruawahia		
1954	13th Dominion Rover Moot	Timaru		
1955	14th Dominion Rover Moot	Wanganui		
1956	15th Dominion Rover Moot	Waiora, Otago		
1957	16th Dominion Rover Moot	Levin		
1959	17th Dominion Rover Moot	Little River, Banks Peninsula		
1960	18th Dominion Rover Moot	Kahuterawa Reserve, Palmerston North		
1961	19th Dominion Rover Moot	Raincliff, Timaru		
1962	20th Dominion Rover Moot	Ness Valley, Clevedon		
1963	21st Dominion Rover Moot	Waiora, Dunedin		
1964	22nd Dominion Rover Moot	Dunedin		
1964/5	Regional Rover Moot	Waiora, Dunedin		
1965	23rd Dominion Rover Moot (Hoiho Moot)	Tauranga		
1966	24th National Rover Moot	Blue Skies, Christchurch		
1967	25th National Rover Moot	Brookfield Outdoor Education Centre, Wainuiomata, Wellington		
1968	26th National Rover Moot	Waiora		
1969	27th National Rover Moot	Wanganui		
1970	28th National Rover Moot (Mania-o-roto)	Ashburton		
1971	29th National Rover Moot	Camp Sladdin, South Auckland		
1972	30th National Rover Moot	Blue Skies, Christchurch		
1973	31st National Rover Moot	Brookfield, Wellington		
1974	32nd South Pacific Rover Moot	Christchurch		
1975	33rd National Rover Moot	Scoutlands Wanganui		
1976	34th National Rover Moot	Timaru		
1977	35th National Rover Moot	Motumoana, Auckland		
1978	36th National Rover Moot	Dunedin		
1979	37th National Rover Moot	Waikato		
1980	38th National Rover Moot	Brookfield Outdoor Education Centre, Wainuiomata, Wellington		
1981	39th National Rover Moot	Lincoln University, Canterbury		
1982	40th National Rover Moot	Manawatu		
1983	41st National Rover Moot	Rotorua, Bay of Plenty		
1984	42nd National Rover Moot	Oamaru		
1985	43rd National Rover Moot	New Plymouth	Maui Rover Crew	
1986	44th National/5th Asia-Pacific Rover Scout Moot (Golden Jubilee Moot)	Christchurch		
1987	45th National Rover Moot	Auckland		
1988	46th National Rover Moot	Southland		
1989	47th National Rover Moot	Wellington		
1990	48th National Rover Moot (Aorangi)	Timaru		
1991	49th National Rover Moot	Queenstown		
1992	50th National Rover Moot (The Golden Moot )	Feilding		
1993	51st National Rover Moot ('Monsta' Moot)	Auckland		
1994	52nd National Rover Moot (Green Moot)	Lincoln, Canterbury		
1995	53rd National Rover Moot (Absolutely Positively Moot)	Wellington		
1996	54th National Rover Moot (Medieval Moot)	Kerikeri High School, Northland		
1997	55th National Rover Moot (Scottish Moot)	Logan Park High School, Dunedin		
1998	56th National Rover Moot (RARC UP)	Wanganui		
1999	57th National Rover Moot (Rock Moot)	Nelson		
2000	58th National Rover Moot (Nautical Moot)	Whangaparaoa, Auckland		
2001	59th National Rover Moot (Dam Moot)	Fairlie, South Canterbury		
2002	60th National Rover Moot (Welly Moot)	Brookfield Outdoor Education Centre, Wainuiomata, Wellington		
2003	61st National Rover Moot (Gumboot Moot)	Ruakawa, Wanganui		
2004	62nd National Rover Moot (Skool Moot)	Te Kauri Lodge, Kawhia, Waikato	Auckland Area	
2005	63rd National Rover Moot (Medieval Moot)	Eyrewell Forest, Canterbury		
2006	64th National Rover Moot (Winterless Wonderland Moot)	Dargaville, Northland		
2007	65th National Rover Moot (I Am Moot)	Waiora, Dunedin	Otago Rover Crew	
2008	66th National Rover Moot (Midnight Moot)	Otaki		
2009	67th National Rover Moot (Jafa Moot)	Helensville		
2010	68th National Rover Moot (Hero Moot)	Omaka, Canterbury		
2011	69th National Rover Moot (Sm69th Moot)	Waiotapu, Rotorua, Bay of Plenty		
2012	70th National Rover Moot (Windback Moot)	Trefoil Park, Kaikohe, Northland		
2013	71st National Rover Moot (Rapa Moot)	Wairarapa Pursuits Centre, Masterton, Wairarapa	Lower North Island	
2014	72nd National Rover Moot (EntertainMoot)	Ashley Gorge Holiday Park, North Canterbury, Canterbury	Upper South Island	
2015	73rd National Rover Moot (She'll Be Right Moot)	Karamu Trail Track, Karamu, Waikato	Central North Island Region (CNIRS)	
2016	74th National Rover Moot (Deco Moot)	Riverpark Event Centre, Waipawa, Hawkes Bay	Lower North Island	
2017	75th National Rover Moot (Big Bang Moot)	Ahuroa Volunteer Rural Fire Station, Ahuroa, Auckland	Upper North Island	
2018	76th National Rover Moot (Euromoot)	Ashburton	Upper South Island Region	
2019	77th National Rover Moot (Once Upon A Moot)	Brookfield Outdoor Education Centre, Wainuiomata, Wellington	Lower North Island Region	
2020	78th National Rover Moot (MOTI-Moot On The Internet)	Online	National Rover Team	
2021	79th National Rover Moot (Déjà Vu Moot)	Aka Aka Primary School, Waiuku, Auckland	Upper North Island Region	
2023	80th National Rover Moot (Wild Moot)	Kumara Racecourse, Kumara, West Coast	Upper South Island Region	
2024	81st National Rover Moot (Ye 'Olde Moot)	Lakes Ranch, Rotorua, Bay of Plenty	Upper North Island Region	
2025	82nd National Rover Moot (Whale of a Moot)	Kaikoura Trotting Club, Kaikōura, Canterbury	South Island Region	
2026	83rd National Rover Moot (Mythology Moot)	Brookfield Outdoor Education Center, Wainuiomata, Wellington	Lower North Island Region	
