= Brookfield Township =

Brookfield Township may refer to:

- Brookfield Township, LaSalle County, Illinois
- Brookfield Township, Clinton County, Iowa
- Brookfield Township, Worth County, Iowa
- Brookfield Township, Eaton County, Michigan
- Brookfield Township, Huron County, Michigan
- Brookfield Township, Minnesota
- Brookfield Township, Linn County, Missouri, in Linn County, Missouri
- Brookfield Township, Noble County, Ohio
- Brookfield Township, Trumbull County, Ohio
- Brookfield Township, Tioga County, Pennsylvania
- Brookfield Township, McCook County, South Dakota, in McCook County, South Dakota
