= Henry Hallam =

English historian

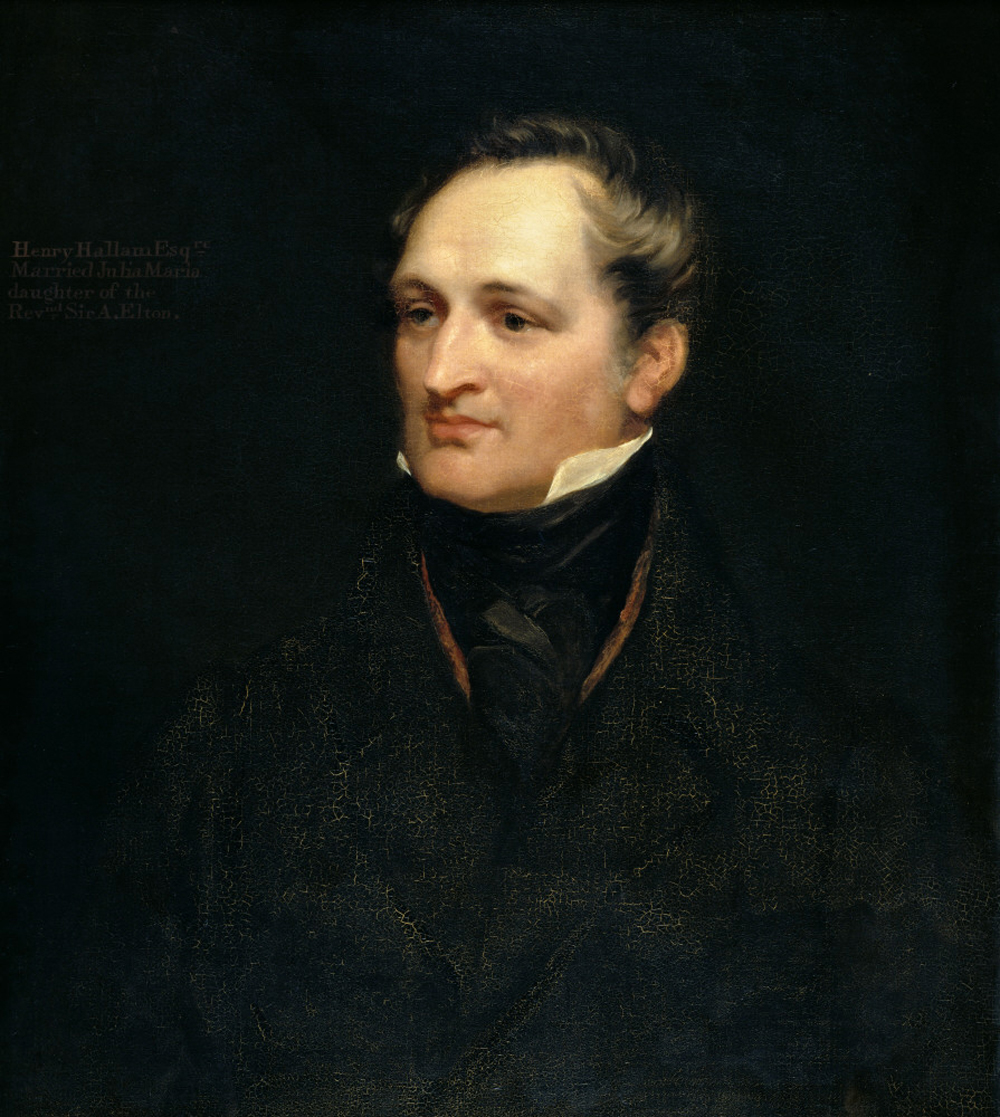
Henry Hallam in a 19th-century portrait by Thomas Phillips. The painting is currently at Clevedon Court in Clevedon, North Somerset, England.

Henry Hallam FRS FRSE FSA FRAS (9 July 1777 – 21 January 1859) was an English historian. Educated at Eton and Christ Church, Oxford, he practised as a barrister on the Oxford circuit for some years before turning to history. His major works were View of the State of Europe during the Middle Ages (1818), The Constitutional History of England (1827), and Introduction to the Literature of Europe, in the Fifteenth, Sixteenth and Seventeenth Centuries (1837). Although he took no part in politics himself, he was well acquainted with the band of authors and politicians who led the Whig party. In an 1828 review of Constitutional History, Robert Southey claimed that the work was biased in favour of the Whigs.

Hallam was a fellow of the Royal Society, and a trustee of the British Museum. In 1830 he received the gold medal for history founded by George IV.

== Life ==
The only son of Rev John Hallam, canon of Windsor and dean of Bristol, Henry Hallam was born on 9 July 1777 and educated at Eton and Christ Church, Oxford, graduating in 1799. Called to the Bar, he practised for some years on the Oxford circuit; but his tastes were literary, and when, on his father's death in 1812, he inherited a small estate in Lincolnshire, he gave himself up to study. He had become connected with the brilliant band of authors and politicians who led the Whig party, a connection to which he owed his appointment to the well-paid and easy post of commissioner of stamps; but took no part in politics himself. He was, however, an active supporter of many popular movements—particularly of that which ended in the abolition of the slave trade; and he was attached to the political principles of the Whigs.

Hallam's earliest literary work was undertaken in connection with the Whig periodical, the Edinburgh Review, where his review of Walter Scott's Dryden attracted attention. His first major work, View of the State of Europe during the Middle Ages (two volumes), was published in 1818, and was followed nine years later by The Constitutional History of England (1827, two volumes). Introduction to the Literature of Europe, in the Fifteenth, Sixteenth and Seventeenth Centuries (four volumes) appeared in 1837. A volume of supplemental notes to his Middle Ages was published in 1843, and in 1852 Literary Essays and Characters: Selected from "An Introduction to the Literature of Europe" was published. These works represent nearly all of Hallam's career.

Hallam was a fellow of the Royal Society, and a trustee of the British Museum. In 1830 he received the gold medal for history founded by George IV.

== Historical works ==
Hallam described his work Middle Ages as a series of historical dissertations for the period from the 5th to the 15th century. The work consists of nine long chapters: the histories of France, Italy, Spain, Germany, and of the Greek and Saracenic empires, fill five chapters. Others deal with major institutional features of medieval society: the feudal system, the ecclesiastical system, and the political system of England. The last chapter sketches society, commerce, manners, and literature in the Middle Ages.

The Constitutional History of England (1827) took up the subject at the point at which it had been dropped in Middle Ages, namely the accession of Henry VII, and carried it down to the accession of George III. Hallam stopped here because he was unwilling to touch on issues of contemporary politics which seemed to him to run back through the whole period of the reign of George III, but this did not prevent him from being accused of bias. The Quarterly Review for 1828 contains a hostile article on the Constitutional History, written by Robert Southey, full of reproach: the work, he said, is the "production of a decided partisan". It was his distant treatment of Charles I, Thomas Cranmer and William Laud that provoked the indignation of Southey.

Hallam, like Thomas Babington Macaulay, ultimately referred political questions to the standard of Whig constitutionalism. But he was conscientious with his materials, and it was this which made the Constitutional History one of the standard textbooks of English politics.

== Literary history works ==
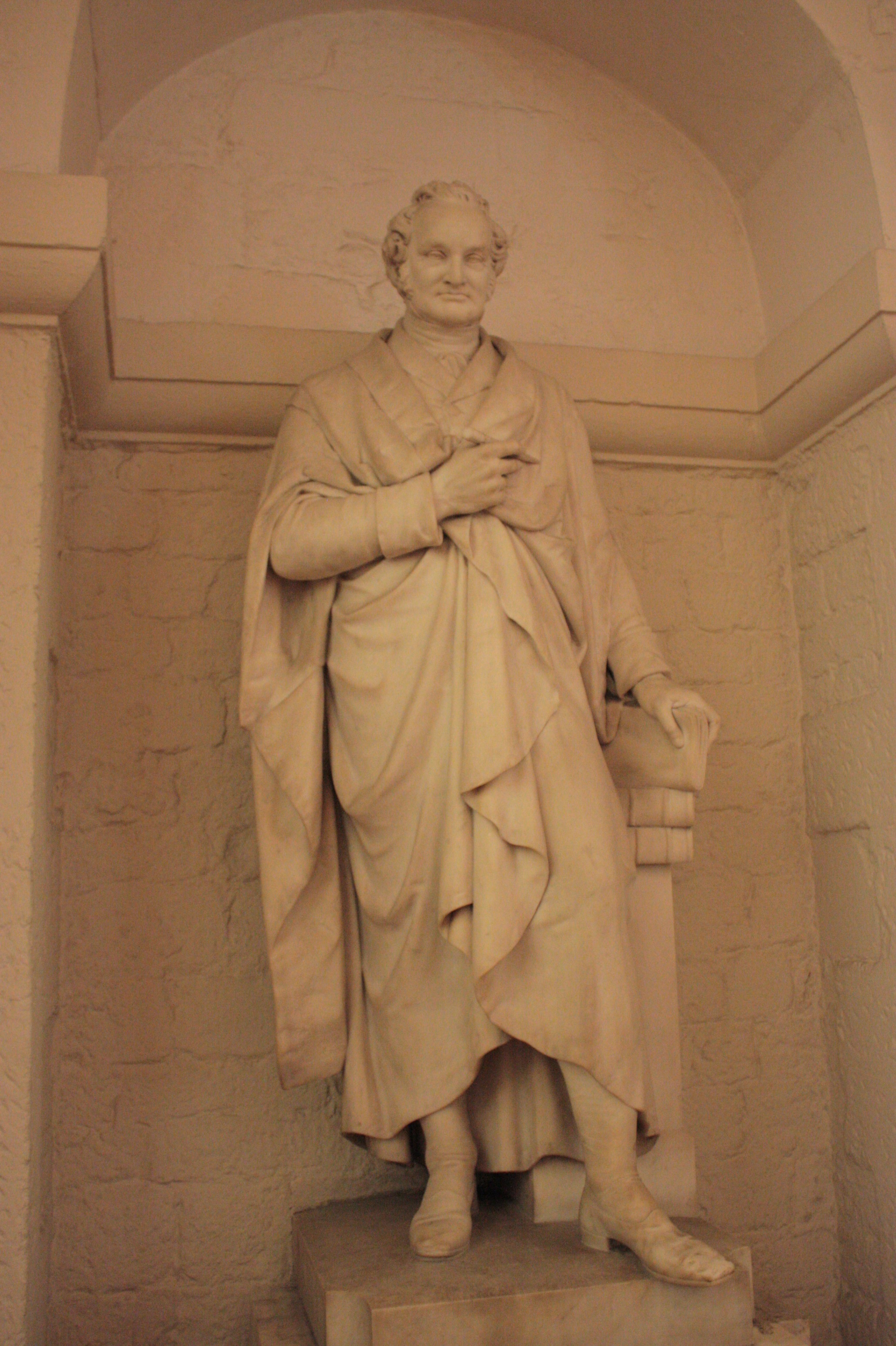
The memorial to Hallam in St Paul's Cathedral

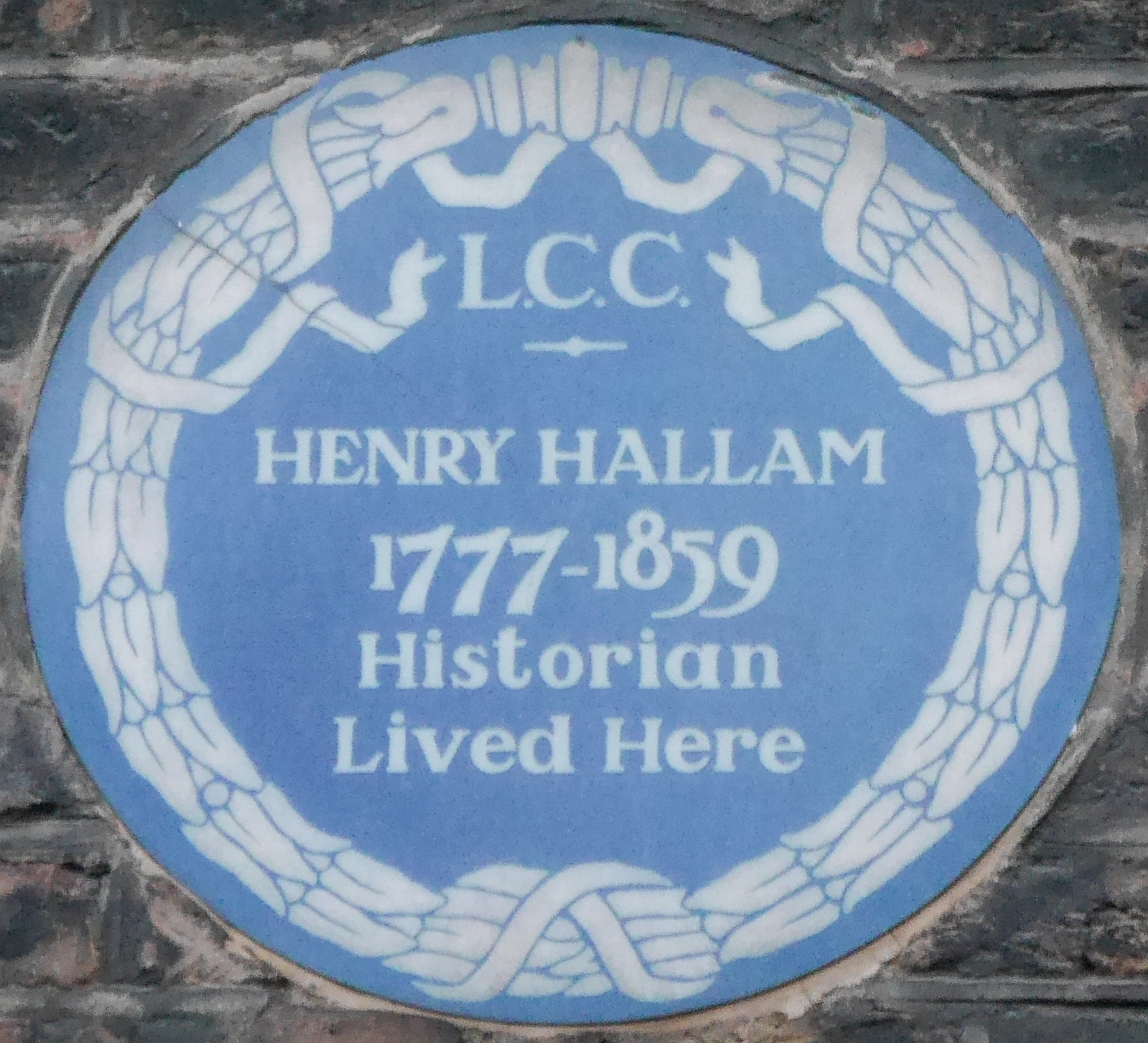
A blue plaque at 67 Wimpole Street in London commemorating Hallam

The 4-volume Introduction to the Literature of Europe in the Fifteenth, Sixteenth, and Seventeenth Centuries (1837–1839) continues a topic broached in the View of the Middle Ages. In the first chapter Hallam sketches the state of literature in Europe down to the end of the 14th century: the extinction of ancient learning which followed the fall of the Roman Empire and the rise of Christianity; the preservation of the Latin language in the services of the church; and the revival of letters after the 7th century. For the first century and a half of his period he is mainly occupied with a review of classical learning, taking short decennial periods and noticing works which they produced. For the period 1520–1550 there are separate chapters on ancient literature, theology, science, speculative philosophy and jurisprudence, the literature of taste and other miscellaneous literature; and the subdivisions of subjects is carried further in later periods. Thus poetry, the drama and polite literature form the subjects of separate chapters. An author may be mentioned in many chapters: William Shakespeare, Hugo Grotius, Francis Bacon and Thomas Hobbes appear in half a dozen different places.

The plan excluded biographical history. It is an account of the books which would make a complete library of the period, arranged according to date of publication and subject.

== Death and memorials ==
Hallam died in London on 21 January 1859, aged 81. He has a memorial in the crypt of St Paul's Cathedral in London, and there is a blue plaque at 67 Wimpole Street in London installed by the London County Council commemorating the fact that he once lived there.

== Family ==
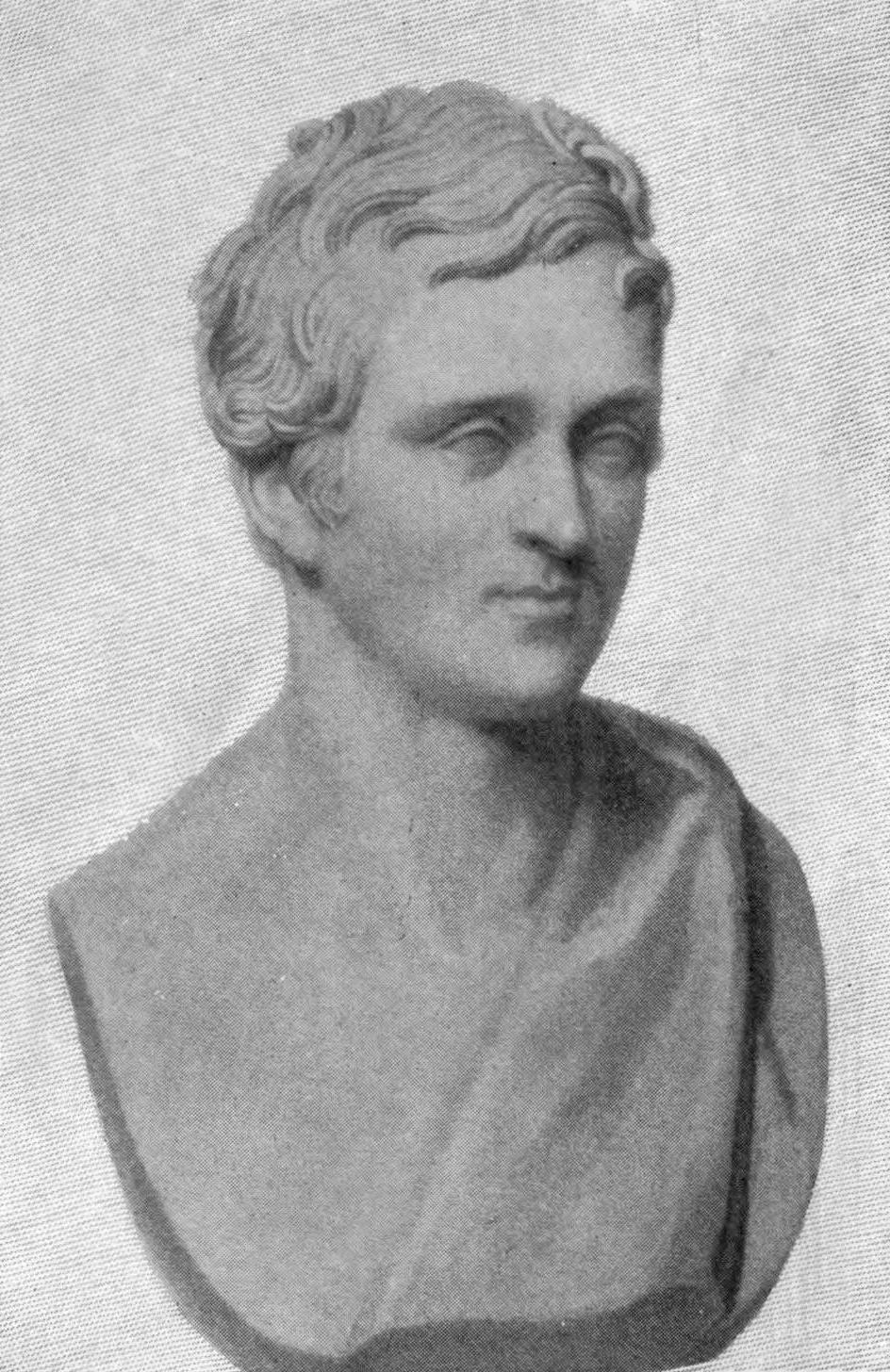
A drawing of a bust of Hallam's son Arthur by Sir Francis Leggatt Chantrey

In 1807 Hallam married Julia Maria Elton (daughter of Sir Charles Elton). She died in 1847.

Hallam lost his children, one after another. His eldest son, the poet Arthur Henry Hallam—the "A.H.H." of Tennyson's In Memoriam A.H.H.—died in 1833 at the age of 22. In 1834 Hallam edited and published Remains, in Verse and Prose, of Arthur Henry Hallam. In 1850 his second son, Henry Fitzmaurice Hallam, also died.

In 1852 his daughter Julia married John Farnaby Cator, who was later created a Baronet in the name of Lennard. They had one son, Henry Arthur Hallam Farnaby Lennard, the 2nd Baronet, born in 1859) and two daughters. Julia died in 1888.
