= George Courthope, 1st Baron Courthope =

British politician (1877–1955)

Lord Courthope in 1945

George Loyd Courthope, 1st Baron Courthope, MC, TD, PC, JP, DL (12 June 1877 – 2 September 1955), known as Sir George Courthope, Bt, from 1925 to 1945, was a British Conservative Party politician.

== Background and education ==
The member of a family that had been settled at Whiligh in Sussex for many centuries, Courthope was the son of Lieutenant-Colonel George John Courthope and his wife Elinor Sarah, daughter of Lieutenant-Colonel Edward Loyd. He was educated at Eton and Christ Church, Oxford and was later called to the Bar, Inner Temple.

== Political career ==
He was elected as the Member of Parliament (MP) for Rye in the 1906 general election, a seat he held until 1945. He never held ministerial office but was sworn of the Privy Council in 1937. He was also a Colonel in the 5th Battalion of the Royal Sussex Regiment (Territorial Army) and fought in the First World War, where he was wounded, mentioned in despatches and awarded the Military Cross.

Courthope was created a Baronet, of Whiligh in the County of Sussex, in the 1925 Birthday Honours, and in 1945 he was raised to the peerage as Baron Courthope, of Whiligh in the County of Sussex.

Courthope was appointed a Deputy Lieutenant for Sussex in 1921.

== Family ==
Lord Courthope married firstly Hilda Gertrude, daughter of Major-General Henry Pelham Close, in 1899. They had two daughters. After her death in 1940 he married secondly Margaret, daughter of Frederick Barry, in 1944. Lord Courthope died in September 1955, aged 78. As he had no male issue the baronetcy and barony became extinct.

== Westminster Hall oaks ==
George Courthope took a particular interest in forestry, being at sometime President of the Royal English Arboricultural Society, and Chairman of the Empire Forestry Association and of the Forestry Commission's Consultative Committee for England. He famously supplied oak wood for the repair of the 14th-century roof of Westminster Hall, some cut from trees over 600 years old, from the same forest in Whiligh, Sussex, which had supplied some of the original timber in 1393.

== Arms ==
Coat of arms of George Courthope, 1st Baron Courthope
Crest A demi-stag salient Gules attired and charged with estoiles wavy Or. Escutcheon Argent a fess Azure between three estoiles of six points wavy Sable. Supporters Dexter a forester holding in his exterior hand his hat; sinister a farmer holding in his exterior hand a pitchfork erect; all Proper. Motto Court Hope

Parliament of the United Kingdom
Preceded by Charles Frederick Hutchinson	Member of Parliament for Rye; 1906 – 1945	Succeeded by William Cuthbert
Peerage of the United Kingdom
New creation	Baron Courthope; 1945 – 1955	Title extinct
Baronetage of the United Kingdom
New creation	Baronet (of Whiligh); 1925–1955	Extinct
