= Jane Octavia Brookfield =

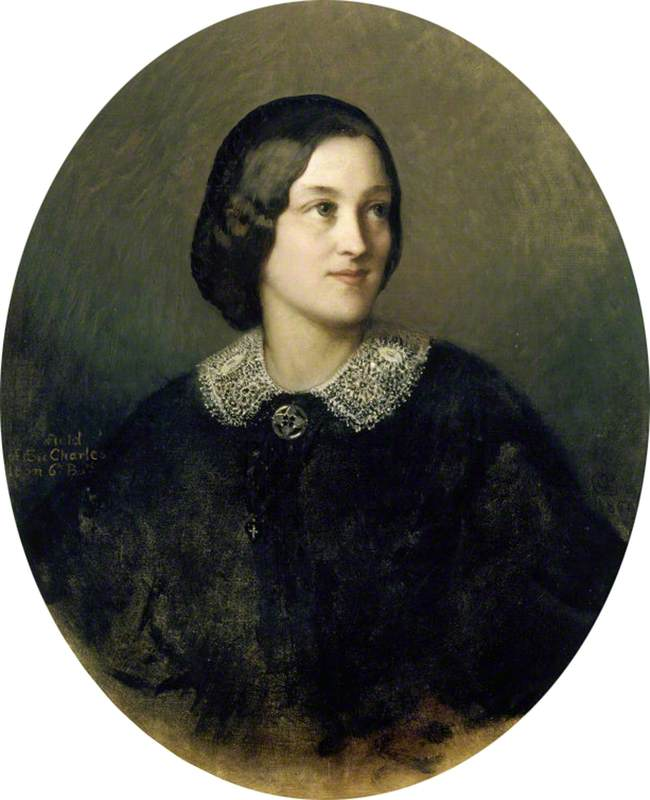
- Portrait of Brookfield in 1859 by Charles Albert Ludovici
- Born: Jane Octavia Elton; 25 March 1821; Clifton, Nr. Bristol
- Died: 27 November 1896 (aged 75); Chelsea, London
- Occupation: Author
- Spouse: William Henry Brookfield
- Children: Arthur Montagu Brookfield (1853–1940) and Charles Hallam Elton Brookfield (1857–1913)
- Parents: Charles Abraham Elton (father); Sarah Smith (mother)

Jane Octavia Brookfield (25 March 1821 – 27 November 1896) was a literary hostess and writer, best known for her platonic friendship with William Makepeace Thackeray. She also wrote four novels; some critics have drawn parallels between the events in these novels and her relationship with Thackeray.

== Biography ==
Brookfield was born on 25 March 1821, the youngest daughter of Sir Charles Abraham Elton, a former soldier. She lived with her seven sisters and five brothers, along with her father and mother Sarah in Clevedon Court, near Bristol. Sir Charles was a published author, writing an elegy about two of his sons who had drowned in the Bristol Channel, and was friends with both Charles Lamb and Samuel Taylor Coleridge.

In 1837, the family moved to Southampton, and due to Jane's height her father nicknamed her "Glumdalclitch". In 1838 she was courted by and became engaged to William Henry Brookfield, the priest at the local church, twelve years her senior. After he found a better job, as curate of St James's Church, Piccadilly, the couple married on 18 November 1841.

Jane maintained an influential literary salon, which included among others Thackeray and her husband's old college friend Alfred Tennyson. It was her close friendship with Thackeray for which she is best remembered and in the mid-1840s they were on intimate terms. D. J. Taylor in her biography in the Oxford Dictionary of National Biography states "the relationship between him and Jane was almost certainly not sexual (there may have been a chaste embrace or two ...)". Thackeray incorporated some of her characteristics into two of his characters: Amelia Sedley in Vanity Fair (1848), and Laura Bell in Pendennis (1850).

In 1851, William Brookfield barred Thackeray from further visits to or correspondence with Jane. The friendship was never renewed; Thackeray's health worsened steadily through the 1850s and he died in 1863.

Jane Brookfield wrote four novels that were published several years after Thackeray's death, all between 1868 and 1873. Some critics have seen echoes of the friendship with Thackeray in these novels. She ceased writing after her husband died in 1874.

Jane herself died in 1896 at the age of 75.

== Family ==
The couple were survived by their two sons Arthur Montagu Brookfield (1853–1940) who became a British Army officer, diplomat author and Conservative politician who sat in the House of Commons from 1885 to 1903; and Charles Hallam Elton Brookfield (1857–1913) an actor.

== Novels ==
- Only George (1868)
- Not Too Late (1868)
- Influence (1871)
- Not a Heroine (1873)
